= 2026–27 Leyton Orient F.C. season =

128th season in existence of Leyton Orient FC

Leyton Orient
2026–27 season
- Chairman: Nigel Travis
- Head coach: Richie Wellens
- Stadium: Brisbane Road
- League One: 19th
- EFL Cup: Third round

The 2026–27 season is the 128th season in the history of Leyton Orient Football Club and their fourth consecutive season being in League One. The club are participating in League One, and also compete in the FA Cup, the EFL Cup, and the EFL Trophy.

== Transfers and contracts ==
=== In ===
Date	Pos.	Player	From	Fee	Ref.
23 June 2026	RB	(Wales) Fin Stevens	(Germany) St. Pauli	Undisclosed	
24 June 2026	LW	(Albania) Armando Dobra	(England) Chesterfield	Undisclosed	
1 July 2026 (Note: The transfer was announced on 11 June, and would become official on July 1 once Springett's contract at Norwich City expired.)	RW	(Republic of Ireland) Tony Springett	(England) Norwich City	Free	
3 July 2026	GK	(England) Nathan Baxter	(England) Watford	Undisclosed	
10 July 2026	CDM	(Jamaica) Isaac Hayden	(England) Queens Park Rangers	Free	
21 July 2026	CB	(England) Joseph Olowu	(England) Stockport County	Undisclosed	
2 August 2026	CF	(Oman) Tariq Al-Sadi	(Spain) Sant Andreu	Free	
7 August 2026	CF	(Republic of Ireland) Jaze Kabia	(England) Grimsby Town	Undisclosed	
1 September 2026	CF	(England) Dane Scarlett	(England) Tottenham Hotspur	Undisclosed	
2 September 2026	CAM	(Republic of Ireland) Alex Gilbert	(England) Middlesbrough	Free	
8 September 2026	CM	(Moldova) Cristian Păscăluță	(Moldova) Spartanii Sportul	Free	

=== Loaned in ===
Date	Pos.	Player	From	Loaned until	Ref.
11 July 2026	RW	(Morocco) Yusuf Akhamrich	(England) Tottenham Hotspur	End of Season	
28 July 2026	LB	(England) Somto Boniface	(England) Ipswich Town	End of Season	
10 August 2026	CF	(England) Nicholas Oyekunle	(England) Southampton	End of Season	
11 August 2026	RB	(England) Alfie Gilchrist	(England) West Bromwich Albion	End of Season	
1 September 2026	GK	(Sweden) Oliver Dovin	(England) Coventry City	End of Season	

=== Loaned out ===
Date	Pos.	Player	To	Loaned until	Ref.
9 July 2026	LW	(Sierra Leone) Josh Koroma	(England) Chesterfield	End of Season	
21 August 2026	CM	(England) Zak O'Keefe	(England) Welling United	19 September 2026	
24 August 2026	CDM	(England) Tyreeq Bakinson	(England) Plymouth Argyle	End of Season	
26 August 2026	CM	(England) Eddie Wright	(England) Ramsgate	23 September 2026	
1 September 2026	CM	(Kenya) Zech Obiero	(England) Gillingham	End of Season	
10 September 2026	CDM	(Scotland) Michael Craig	(England) Harrogate Town	8 December 2026	
15 September 2026	CF	(England) Jakob Lowe	(England) Cray Wanderers	13 October 2026	
16 September 2026	GK	(England) Noah Phillips	(England) Gateshead	14 October 2026 (Note: On 14 October, Phillips was recalled back from his initial half-season loan at Gateshead)	
25 September 2026	RW	(Oman) Tariq Al-Sadi	(England) Enfield Town	25 October 2026	

=== Out ===
Date	Pos.	Player	To	Fee	Ref.
26 June 2026	RW	(England) Sonny Perkins	(England) Wigan Athletic	Undisclosed	
4 July 2026	CM	(Sierra Leone) Azeem Abdulai	(Scotland) Hibernian	Undisclosed	
4 August 2026	CF	(England) Dom Ballard	(England) Bristol City	£5,000,000	
1 September 2026	CM	(Wales) Dylan Levitt	(Scotland) Motherwell	Undisclosed	

=== Released / Out of Contract ===
Date	Pos.	Player	Subsequent club	Joined date	Ref.
30 June 2026	CB	(England) Dan Happe	(Scotland) Aberdeen	1 July 2026	
30 June 2026	RB	(Wales) Tom James	(England) Bristol Rovers	1 July 2026	
30 June 2026	CB	(England) Jack Simpson	(England) Chesterfield	2 July 2026	
30 June 2026	CM	(England) Hayden Bullas	(England) Bromley	23 July 2026	
30 June 2026	CM	(England) Charlie Anderson			
30 June 2026	LB	(England) Tajuddin Bello			
30 June 2026	RW	(England) Diallang Jaiyesimi			
30 June 2026	CAM	(England) Abdi Mohamud			
30 June 2026	LB	(England) Luke Northwood			
30 June 2026	CF	(Equatorial Guinea) Claudio Nzang			
30 June 2026	CM	(England) Izchuckwu Okafor			
30 June 2026	GK	(England) Tobi Oluwayemi			
30 June 2026	GK	(England) Ethan Pike			
30 June 2026	CF	(England) Aaron Sterling			
30 June 2026	CDM	(Jamaica) Makai Welch			

=== New Contract ===
Date	Pos.	Player	Contract until	Ref.
7 May 2026	LWB	(Scotland) Theo Archibald	30 June 2027	
14 August 2026	CB	(England) Phillip Chinedu	Undisclosed	
23 September 2026	CF	(England) Jakob Lowe	30 June 2029 (Note: First professional contract)	

== Pre-season and friendlies ==
On 15 May, Orient announced a pre-season tour to Costa Cálida for a week beginning on July 11, with a fixture against Lincoln City later confirmed. Twelve days later, a trip to face Enfield Town was added as the opening fixture. A third and fourth opposition in Hornchurch and Waltham Abbey was next to be added to the schedule. On 6 June, Belgian Pro League side Royal Antwerp was confirmed as visitors during pre-season. Two days later, a trip to Swindon Town was announced. For this season's JE3 Trophy in tribute to Justin Edinburgh a trip to face Southend United was added. On 2 July, a final pre-season test was added with a trip to face Cheshunt.

Win Draw Loss Fixtures

10 July 2026 Friendly	Enfield Town	1–4	Leyton Orient	Enfield
19:00 BST	Youngs 18'	Report	Dobra 22'; Wellens 67'; Chinedu 85'; Clare 90+2' (pen.)	Stadium: Dave Bryant Stadium

17 July 2026 Friendly	Leyton Orient	2–0	Lincoln City	San Pedro del Pinatar, Spain
17:00 CEST	Trialist 73'; Mitchell 89'	Report		Stadium: Pinatar Arena

21 July 2026 Friendly	Cheshunt	2–1	Leyton Orient	Cheshunt
19:00 BST	Vasiliou 26', 85' (pen.)	Report	Hambury 52'	Stadium: Cheshunt Stadium

21 July 2026 Friendly	Hornchurch	2–1	Leyton Orient	Upminster
19:45 BST	Alexander 57', 64'	Report	Ballard 67'	Stadium: Hornchurch Stadium

25 July 2026 JE3 Trophy	Southend United	1–1 (4–5 p)	Leyton Orient	Southend-on-Sea
15:00 BST	Chambers-Parillon 51'	Report	Ballard 54'	Stadium: Roots Hall

28 July 2026 Friendly	Swindon Town	2–1	Leyton Orient	Swindon
19:00 BST	Millard 7'; Virtue 29'; Sowe (yellow card) 74'	Report	Olowu (yellow card) 66'; Archibald 76'	Stadium: The Nigel Eady County Ground

2 August 2026 Friendly	Leyton Orient	2–1	Royal Antwerp	Leyton
12:30 BST	El Mizouni 79'; Wellens 85'	Report	Scott 62'	Stadium: Brisbane Road

4 August 2026 Friendly	Waltham Abbey	1–7	Leyton Orient	Waltham Abbey
19:00 BST		Report	Wellens 9', 69'; Mitchell 27'; Morris 48'; Springett 68'; Lowe 81', 84'	Stadium: Capershotts

30 September 2026 Friendly	Leyton Orient	3–0	Bournemouth	Waltham Abbey
14:00 BST	Kabia (x3)	Report		Stadium: Capershotts; Attendance: 0 (BCD)

== Competitions ==
=== League One ===
==== League table ====
Pos	Team	Pld	W	D	L	GF	GA	GD	Pts
10	Leicester City	14	6	4	4	23	19	+4	22
11	Cambridge United	15	5	6	4	21	24	−3	21
12	Leyton Orient	14	6	2	6	23	15	+8	20
13	Mansfield Town	14	5	5	4	21	19	+2	20
14	Stevenage	13	5	4	4	18	13	+5	19

Updated to match(es) played on 21 November 2026. Source: EFL Official Website
Rules for classification: 1) Points; 2) Goal difference; 3) Number of goals scored; 4) Head-to-head results; 5) Wins; 6) Away goals; 7) Penalty points (sec 9.5); 8) 12-point sending off offences

==== Results summary ====
Overall								Home						Away					
Pld	W	D	L	GF	GA	GD	Pts	W	D	L	GF	GA	GD	W	D	L	GF	GA	GD
13	5	2	6	19	14	+5	17	3	0	4	10	10	0	2	2	2	9	4	+5

Last updated: 31 October 2026.
Source: Soccerway

==== Results by round ====
Round	1	2	3	4	5	6	7	8^{1}	9	10	11	12	13	14	15^{2}	16	17	18
Ground	H	A	H	A	A	H	H	A	H	A	H	A	A	H	A	H	A	H
Result	L	W	L	W	D	L	W	P	L	D	W	L	L	W	P			
Position	20	10	16	8	9	15	10	P	11	12	9	12	16	14	P			
Points	0	3	3	6	7	7	10	P	10	11	14	14	14	17	P			

Source: EFL
A = Away; H = Home; W = Win; D = Draw; L = Loss; P = Postponed
Notes:
- ^{1} Matchday 8 (vs. Mansfield Town) was postponed due to international call-ups.
- ^{2} Matchday 15 (vs. Doncaster Rovers) was postponed due to international call-ups.

==== Matches ====
On 25 June, the League One fixtures were revealed.

Win Draw Loss Fixtures

15 August 2026 1	Leyton Orient	1–2	Sheffield Wednesday	Leyton
15:00 BST	Olowu 26'; Hayden (yellow card) 57'; Obiero (yellow card) 63'	Report	Slattery 19'; Swinkels (yellow card) 31'; Otegbayo (yellow card) 41'; Lowe 66' (pen.)	Stadium: BetWright Stadium; Referee: Sam Allison

22 August 2026 2	Wigan Athletic	0–2	Leyton Orient	Wigan
15:00 BST	Power (yellow card) 18'	Report	Springett 15'; Kabia (yellow card) 35'; Akhamrich 58'; Hayden (yellow card) 73'; El Mizouni (yellow card) 90+2'	Stadium: The Brick Community Stadium; Attendance: 9,317; Referee: Ross Martin

29 August 2026 3	Leyton Orient	1–3	Barnsley	Leyton
15:00 BST	Hayden (yellow card) 29'; Springett (yellow card) 73'; Archibald (yellow card) 75'; Stevens (yellow card) 78'; Oyekunle 85'	Report	Kirk 15'; Bland (yellow card) 28'; Noslin (yellow card) 62'; McGeehan 64', (yellow card) 69'; Gale (yellow card) 67'; Cleary 76'	Stadium: Brisbane Road; Referee: Scott Jackson

1 September 2026 4	Bromley	0–5	Leyton Orient	Bromley
19:45 BST	Mendy (yellow card) 45+1'; Pinnock (yellow card) 57'; Hondermarck (yellow card) 83'	Report	Stevens (yellow card) 5'; Kabia 36', 66'; Akhamrich 46', 51'; Chinedu (yellow card) 48'; Dobra 90+1'	Stadium: Copperjax Community Stadium; Attendance: 5,022; Referee: Stephen Parkinson

5 September 2026 5	Luton Town	1–1	Leyton Orient	Luton
15:00 BST	Donley 25'; Johnston (yellow card) 57'; Gore (yellow card) 86'	Report	Kabia 34', (yellow card) 42'; Olowu (yellow card) 53'; Akhamrich (yellow card) 57'; Hayden (yellow card) 73'	Stadium: Kenilworth Road; Attendance: 11,307; Referee: Oliver Yates

12 September 2026 6	Leyton Orient	2–3	Wycombe Wanderers	Leyton
12:30 BST	Grimmer 37' (o.g.); Kabia 52'	Report	Wareham 13'; Harvie (yellow card) 30', (goal) 47'; Onyedinma 45+2'; Woodrow (yellow card) 86'; Boyd-Munce (yellow card) 90+1'	Stadium: Brisbane Road; Attendance: 7,171; Referee: Simon Mather
Note: Fixture was initially scheduled for a 15:00 kick-off, but was brought forward for live Sky Sports.

19 September 2026 7	Leyton Orient	1–0	Stevenage	Leyton
15:00 BST	Gilbert 79'		Vancooten (yellow card) 31'; Freestone (yellow card) 32'; Thompson (yellow card) 59'; Phillips (yellow card) 65'	Stadium: Brisbane Road; Referee: Craig Hicks

26 September 2026 8	Mansfield Town	Postponed	Leyton Orient	Mansfield
15:00 BST				Stadium: One Call Stadium
Note: Fixture was postponed due to international call-ups.

3 October 2026 9	Leyton Orient	0–2	Plymouth Argyle	Leyton
15:00 BST	Gilbert (yellow card) 45+1'; Springett (yellow card) 49'	Report	Pepple 52'; Evans 56'; Ross (yellow card) 76'; Ibrahim (yellow card) 84'	Stadium: BetWright Stadium; Attendance: 8,832; Referee: Scott Oldham

10 October 2026 10	Bradford City	0–0	Leyton Orient	Bradford
15:00 BST	Pennington (yellow card) 80'	Report	Morris (yellow card) 26'; Kabia (yellow card) 60'; Gilbert (yellow card) 82'	Stadium: Mbanq Valley Parade; Attendance: 18,884; Referee: Dean Whitestone

17 October 2026 11	Leyton Orient	2–0	Blackpool	Leyton
15:00 BST	Forrester 31'; El Mizouni (yellow card) 67'; Scarlett 76' (pen.)		Bowler (yellow card) 20'; Ashworth (yellow card) 38'; Munroe (yellow card) 74'	Stadium: Brisbane Road; Referee: John Busby

21 October 2026 12	Reading	1–0	Leyton Orient	Reading
20:00 BST	Stokes (yellow card) 14'; Wing (penalty missed) 32'; O'Connor (yellow card) 48'; Lane 52'	Report	Connolly (yellow card) 49'	Stadium: Select Car Leasing Stadium; Attendance: 8,705; Referee: Ben Toner
Note: Fixture was initially scheduled for 20 October, but was pushed back a day for live Sky Sports broadcasting.

24 October 2026 13	Burton Albion	2–1	Leyton Orient	Burton upon Trent
15:00 BST	O'Mahony (yellow card) 32'; Chauke 56'; Collar 86'	Report	Gilbert 34'	Stadium: Pirelli Stadium; Attendance: 3,223; Referee: Richard Eley

31 October 2026 14	Leyton Orient	3–0	Cambridge United	Leyton
12:30 GMT	Edmonds-Green 32'; Kabia 50'; Connolly 62'; El Mizouni (yellow card) 78'	Report	Mpanzu (yellow card) 44'; Bradshaw (yellow card) 45+2'; Watts (yellow card) 70'	Stadium: Brisbane Road; Attendance: 8,639; Referee: George Laflin
Note: Fixture was initially scheduled for a 15:00 kick-off, but was brought forward for live Sky Sports broadcasting.

14 November 2026 15	Doncaster Rovers	Postponed	Leyton Orient	Doncaster
15:00 GMT				Stadium: Club Doncaster Sports Village
Note: Fixture was postponed due to international call-ups.

21 November 2026 16	Leyton Orient	4–1	AFC Wimbledon	Leyton
15:00 GMT	Ogundere 24' (o.g.); Scarlett 30'; Dobra 42', (yellow card) 65'; Gilbert 72', (yellow card) 90+5'	Report	Cornick 63'; Nelson (yellow card) 76'; Browne (yellow card) 90+5'	Stadium: BetWright Stadium; Attendance: Isaac Searle; Referee: 8,543

28 November 2026 17	Stockport County	v	Leyton Orient	Edgeley
15:00 GMT				Stadium: Edgeley Park

1 December 2026 18	Leyton Orient	v	Peterborough United	Leyton
19:00 GMT				Stadium: BetWright Stadium
Note: Fixture was initially scheduled for a 19:45 kick-off, but was brought forward forty-five minutes following an agreement between both sides to make it easier for supporters attending.

=== FA Cup ===
Leyton Orient were drawn at home to Harborough Town in the first round and away to Port Vale in the second round.

Win Draw Loss Fixtures

7 November 2026 First round	Leyton Orient	5–1	Harborough Town	Leyton
15:00 GMT	Dobra 6', (yellow card) 77'; Connolly 25'; El Mizouni 50', 90+6'; Gilchrist (yellow card) 78'; Springett 81'	Report	McAuley (yellow card) 24'; Bello (yellow card) 56'; Walsh (yellow card) 60'; Malone 69', (yellow card) 87'	Stadium: BetWright Stadium; Attendance: 5,958; Referee: Alan Young

4–7 December 2026 Second round	Port Vale	v	Leyton Orient	Burslem
TBA GMT				Stadium: Vale Park

=== EFL Cup ===
Orient were drawn at home to Oxford United in the first round, away to Walsall in the second round and then home to Bradford City in the third round.

Win Draw Loss Fixtures

8 August 2026 First round	Leyton Orient	2–0	Oxford United	Leyton
15:00 BST	Stevens (yellow card) 27'; Mitchell 85'; El Mizouni 88'	Report	Emakhu (yellow card) 36'	Stadium: Brisbane Road; Attendance: 3,783; Referee: Alex Chilowicz

25 August 2026 Second round	Walsall	0–0 (5–6 p)	Leyton Orient	Bescot
19:45 BST	Sodje (yellow card) 51'; Moore (yellow card) 90+5'	Report	Hayden (yellow card) 49'	Stadium: Pallet-Track Bescot Stadium; Attendance: 2,679; Referee: Andrew Humphries
	Penalties
	Simper (penalty missed); Clarke (penalty scored); Hancock (penalty scored); Sodje (penalty scored); Pressley (penalty scored); Crew (penalty scored); Skura (penalty missed)		Kabia (penalty missed); Hayden (penalty scored); Archibald (penalty scored); El Mizouni (penalty scored); Obiero (penalty scored); Stevens (penalty scored); Olowu (penalty scored)

8 September 2026 Third round	Leyton Orient	1–3	Bradford City	Leyton
19:45 BST	Archibald (yellow card) 23'; Gillesphey 38' (o.g.); El Mizouni (yellow card) 44'; Chinedu (yellow card) 49'	Report	Lapslie (yellow card) 40'; Swan 45'; Humphrys 58'; Powell 88'	Stadium: BetWright Stadium; Attendance: 2,465; Referee: Edward Duckworth

=== EFL Trophy ===
==== Group stage ====
Orient were drawn against AFC Wimbledon, Barnet and Arsenal U21 into Southern Group F.

Pos	Div	Team	Pld	W	PW	PL	L	GF	GA	GD	Pts	Qualification
1	L2	Barnet	3	2	1	0	0	9	3	+6	8	Advance to Round 2
2	ACA	Arsenal U21	3	2	0	0	1	5	7	−2	6	Advance to Round 2
3	L1	AFC Wimbledon	3	0	0	2	1	2	3	−1	2	
4	L1	Leyton Orient	3	0	1	0	2	4	7	−3	2	

Source: EFL

Win Draw Loss Fixtures

18 August 2026 Group stage	Leyton Orient	1–1 (6–5 p)	AFC Wimbledon	Leyton
19:00 BST	Obiero (yellow card) 51'; Levitt (yellow card) 67'; Gilchrist (yellow card) 73'; Kabia 89'	Report	Stockley 25'; Sweeney (yellow card) 76'	Stadium: BetWright Stadium; Attendance: 1,773 (272 away); Referee: Kirsty Dowle
	Penalties
	Kabia (penalty scored); Springett (penalty scored); Chinedu (penalty scored); Wellens (penalty scored); Akhamrich (penalty scored); Forrester (penalty scored)		Sasu (penalty scored); Smith (penalty scored); Hippolyte (penalty scored); Seddon (penalty scored); Tilley (penalty scored); Ogundere (penalty missed)

15 September 2026 Group stage	Leyton Orient	1–2	Arsenal U21	Leyton
19:00 BST	El Mizouni (yellow card) 9'; Oyekunle 25'		Stevens 45'; Nwaneri (yellow card) 55'; Hamill (yellow card) 71'; Harriman-Annous 81'	Stadium: Brisbane Road; Attendance: 675; Referee: George Laflin

10 November 2026 Group stage	Barnet	4–2	Leyton Orient	Edgware
19:00 GMT	Maskell 33'; Smith 45+1'; Liwala (yellow card) 48'; Springett 59' (o.g.); Siaw 65'; Noel-Williams (yellow card) 90+5'	Report	Morris 43'; Scarlett (yellow card) 53', (goal) 86'	Stadium: The Hive Stadium; Attendance: 770; Referee: Scott Jackson

== Statistics ==
=== Appearances and goals ===
As of match played 10 November 2026

Players with no appearances are not included on the list; italics indicated loaned in player

No.	Pos	Nat	Player	Total		League One		FA Cup		EFL Cup		EFL Trophy	
No.	Pos	Nat	Player	Apps	Goals	Apps	Goals	Apps	Goals	Apps	Goals	Apps	Goals
1	GK	(England) ENG	Nathan Baxter	13	0	11+0	0	1+0	0	1+0	0	0+0	0
2	DF	(Wales) WAL	Fin Stevens	18	0	13+0	0	1+0	0	1+2	0	0+1	0
3	DF	(England) ENG	James Morris	13	1	6+1	0	0+0	0	2+1	0	3+0	1
4	DF	(England) ENG	Rarmani Edmonds-Green	2	1	1+0	1	1+0	0	0+0	0	0+0	0
5	DF	(England) ENG	Joseph Olowu	18	1	11+1	1	0+1	0	1+2	0	2+0	0
6	DF	(England) ENG	Will Forrester	14	1	9+0	1	0+0	0	2+0	0	3+0	0
7	FW	(Republic of Ireland) IRL	Ollie O'Neill	2	0	1+1	0	0+0	0	0+0	0	0+0	0
8	MF	(Tunisia) TUN	Idris El Mizouni	20	3	11+2	0	1+0	2	2+1	1	1+2	0
9	FW	(Republic of Ireland) IRL	Jaze Kabia	18	6	12+1	5	1+0	0	0+2	0	0+2	1
10	FW	(Republic of Ireland) IRL	Aaron Connolly	7	2	3+3	1	1+0	1	0+0	0	0+0	0
11	DF	(England) ENG	Demetri Mitchell	9	1	3+3	0	0+0	0	1+1	1	1+0	0
12	DF	(England) ENG	Alfie Gilchrist	10	0	5+2	0	1+0	0	1+0	0	1+0	0
13	GK	(England) ENG	Noah Phillips	7	0	2+1	0	0+0	0	2+0	0	2+0	0
14	MF	(England) ENG	Isaac Hayden	17	0	10+2	0	0+0	0	2+1	0	1+1	0
15	MF	(Moldova) MDA	Cristian Pascaluta	1	0	0+0	0	0+0	0	0+0	0	1+0	0
17	FW	(Albania) ALB	Armando Dobra	16	2	3+8	1	1+0	1	2+0	0	2+0	0
18	FW	(England) ENG	Dane Scarlett	12	2	3+5	1	0+1	0	0+1	0	1+1	1
19	DF	(England) ENG	Somto Boniface	4	0	2+0	0	1+0	0	1+0	0	0+0	0
20	MF	(Republic of Ireland) IRL	Alex Gilbert	10	2	7+1	2	1+0	0	0+0	0	1+0	0
22	FW	(Morocco) MAR	Yusuf Akhamrich	17	3	11+0	3	0+1	0	1+1	0	1+2	0
23	GK	(Sweden) SWE	Oliver Dovin	1	0	0+0	0	0+0	0	0+0	0	1+0	0
25	MF	(England) ENG	Charlie Wellens	16	0	6+3	0	1+0	0	1+2	0	2+1	0
27	FW	(Republic of Ireland) IRL	Tony Springett	15	2	4+5	1	0+1	1	1+1	0	2+1	0
28	DF	(England) ENG	Sean Clare	8	0	1+4	0	0+0	0	1+0	0	2+0	0
30	MF	(England) ENG	Alfie Wellens	1	0	0+0	0	0+0	0	0+0	0	0+1	0
34	DF	(England) ENG	Phil Chinedu	15	0	7+2	0	0+1	0	3+0	0	0+2	0
44	FW	(Scotland) SCO	Theo Archibald	10	0	0+5	0	0+0	0	3+0	0	2+0	0
49	FW	(England) ENG	Nicholas Oyekunle	9	2	0+5	1	0+0	0	2+0	0	2+0	1
Players who featured but departed the club on Loan:
29	MF	(Kenya) KEN	Zech Obiero	5	0	1+1	0	0+0	0	2+0	0	1+0	0
Players who featured but departed the club permanently during the season:
24	MF	(Wales) WAL	Dylan Levitt	2	0	0+0	0	0+0	0	1+0	0	1+0	0

== Awards ==
=== Player awards ===
==== EFL League One Player of the Month ====
Month	Player	Result	Ref.
September	(Republic of Ireland) Jaze Kabia	Nominated	

==== PFA League One Fans' Player of the Month ====
Month	Player	Result	Ref.
September	(Morocco) Yusuf Akhamrich	Nominated	
