= Nicholas Oyekunle =

English footballer (born 2007)

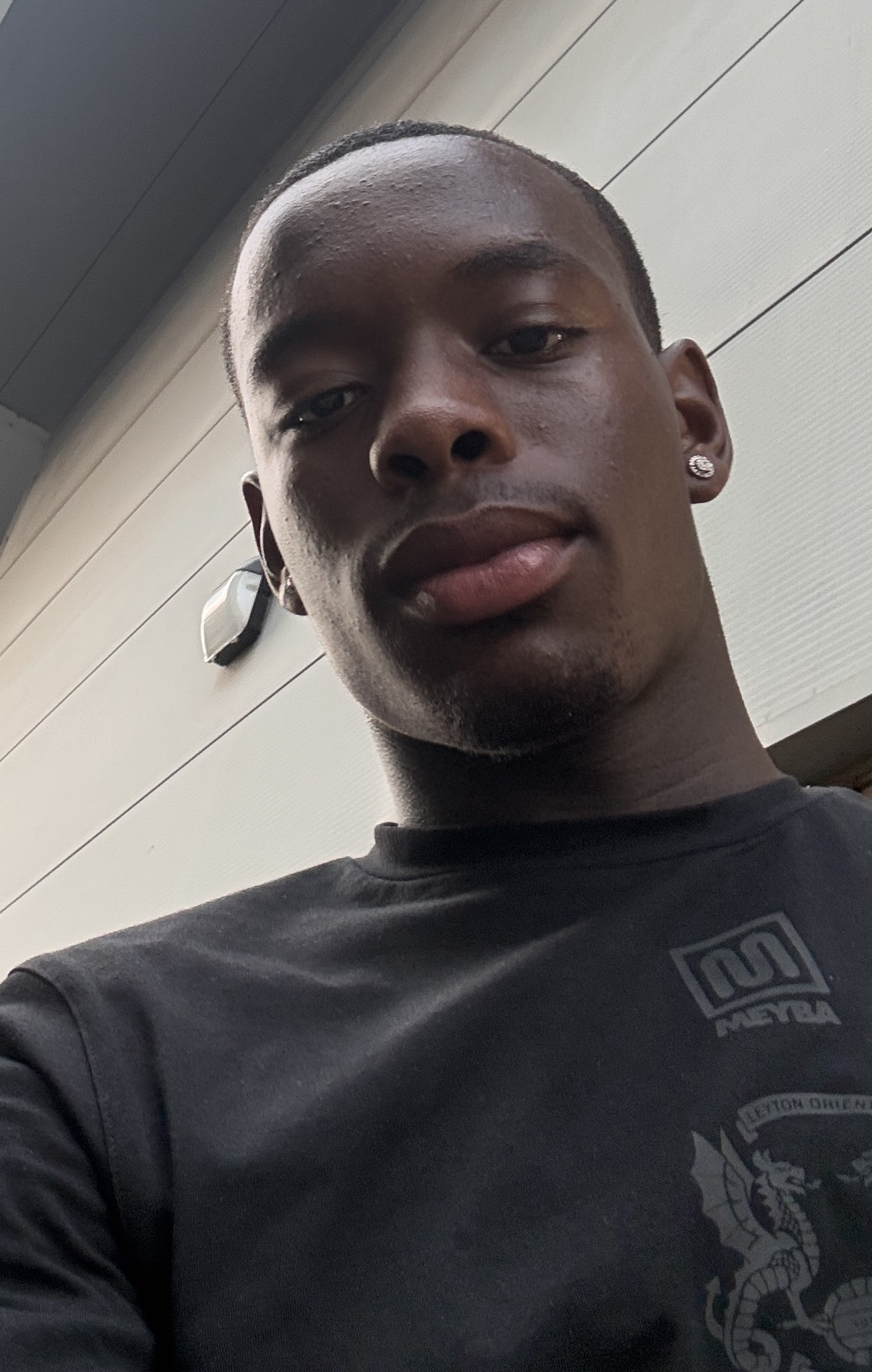
- Oyekunle in 2026

Personal information
- Full name: Adetokunbo Adewale Ayomide Oyekunle
- Date of birth: 9 January 2007 (age 19)
- Place of birth: Portsmouth, England
- Position: Forward

Team information
- Current team: Leyton Orient (on loan from Southampton)
- Number: 49

Youth career
- Southampton

Senior career*
Years	Team	Apps	(Gls)
2025–	Southampton	3	(0)
2026–	→ Leyton Orient (loan)	5	(1)

International career^{‡}
2025–	England U18	2	(0)
- * Club domestic league appearances and goals as of 05:28, 6 September 2026 (UTC) ‡ National team caps and goals as of 19:51, 1 November 2025 (UTC)

Adetokunbo Adewale Ayomide Oyekunle (born 9 January 2007), known as Nicholas Oyenkunle, is an English professional footballer who plays as a forward for EFL League One club Leyton Orient, on loan from EFL Championship club Southampton.

== Club career ==
On 8 February 2024, Oyenkunle signed his first professional contract with Southampton. In May 2025, he became the all-time leading scorer in the U18 Premier League. On 18 July, Oyenkunle signed a new two-year contract. Oyenkunle made his first appearance for the club on 1 November in a 2–0 home defeat against Preston North End after he replaced Mads Roerslev in the 86th minute. On 30 April 2026, he signed a one-year contract extension.

On 7 August 2026, Oyekunle joined Leyton Orient on a season-long loan. He made his debut for the club on 15 August in a 2–1 home defeat against Sheffield Wednesday after he replaced James Morris in the 73rd minute. On 29 August, Oyekunle scored his first goal for the club in a 3–1 home defeat against Barnsley.

== International career ==
Born in England, Oyenkunle is of Nigerian descent. On 19 May 2025, he was named in the England under-18 squad for the first time. He made his debut on 28 May in a 2–1 defeat against Morocco under-18s.

== Career statistics ==
As of match played 15 September 2026

Appearances and goals by club, season and competition
Club	Season	League			National Cup		League Cup		Other		Total	
Club	Season	Division	Apps	Goals	Apps	Goals	Apps	Goals	Apps	Goals	Apps	Goals
Southampton	2025–26	Championship	3	0	1	0	0	0	0	0	4	0
Southampton	2026–27	Championship	0	0	0	0	0	0	—		0	0
Southampton	Total		3	0	1	0	0	0	0	0	4	0
Leyton Orient (loan)	2026–27	League One	5	1	0	0	2	0	2 (Note: Appearances in EFL Trophy)	1	9	2
Career total			8	1	1	0	2	0	2	1	13	2
