= Jason Kabia =

English footballer

Personal information
- Full name: Jason Thomas Kabia
- Date of birth: 26 May 1969 (age 57)
- Place of birth: Sutton-in-Ashfield, England
- Position: Striker

Senior career*
Years	Team	Apps	(Gls)
- Oakham United
1991–1993	Lincoln City	28	(4)
1992	→ Doncaster Rovers (loan)	5	(0)
1993–1995	Valletta		
1995–1997	Gainsborough Trinity		
1997–1998	Cork City		(7)
1998–1999	Waterford United		(1)
1999–2000	Galway United		
2000–2001	Kilkenny City		
2001–2002	Cobh Ramblers		
- * Club domestic league appearances and goals

Jason Thomas Kabia (born 26 May 1969) is an English former professional footballer who played as a striker.

== Career ==
Born in Sutton-in-Ashfield, Kabia played non-league football with Oakham United, before spending two seasons in the Football League with Lincoln City, making a total of 28 league appearances. While at Lincoln, Kabia also spent a loan spell at Doncaster Rovers, making five league appearances. Kabia later played in Malta for Valletta, in English non-league football for Gainsborough Trinity, and in the Republic of Ireland for a number of clubs including Cork City, Galway United, Waterford United, Kilkenny City. In July 2001 he moved to Cobh Ramblers.

== Personal life ==
He is the father of Jaze Kabia, who is also a professional footballer.
