= Noah Phillips =

English footballer (born 7 December 2004)

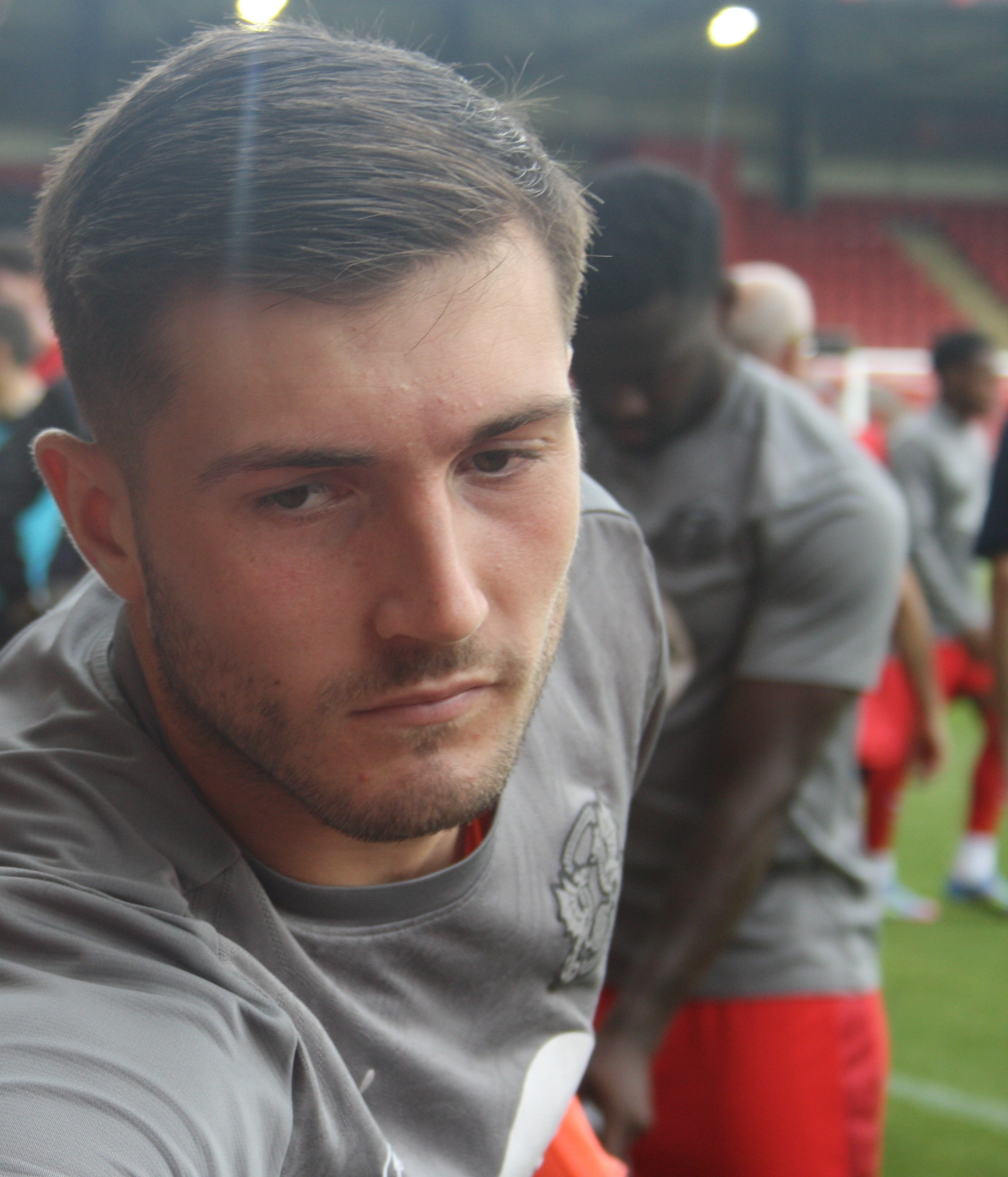

Personal information
- Full name: Noah Phillips
- Date of birth: 7 December 2004 (age 21)
- Place of birth: Havering, England
- Position: Goalkeeper

Team information
- Current team: Leyton Orient
- Number: 13

Youth career
- Leyton Orient

Senior career*
Years	Team	Apps	(Gls)
2021–	Leyton Orient	3	(0)
2021	→ Hornchurch (loan)	3	(0)
2022	→ Bishop's Stortford (loan)	0	(0)
2022	→ Harlow Town (loan)	3	(0)
2023	→ Waltham Abbey (loan)	8	(0)
2023	→ Maldon & Tiptree (loan)	1	(0)
2023	→ Royston Town (loan)	3	(0)
2024	→ Hornchurch (loan)	1	(0)
2024	→ Heybridge Swifts (loan)	9	(0)
2025	→ Dorking Wanderers (loan)	2	(0)
2026	→ Chelmsford City (loan)	17	(0)
2026	→ Gateshead (loan)	2	(0)
- * Club domestic league appearances and goals as of 17:30, 14 October 2026 (UTC)

Noah Phillips (born 7 December 2004) is an English professional footballer who plays as a goalkeeper for EFL League One side Leyton Orient.

== Career ==
Phillips began his career in the academy at Leyton Orient. In September 2021, Phillips experienced his first taste of first team football, making three appearances out on loan at Hornchurch. In September 2022, Phillips made a singular FA Cup appearance for Bishop's Stortford against St Neots Town, after joining the club on a month long loan. Phillips was later loaned out to Harlow Town, Waltham Abbey and Maldon & Tiptree during the 2022–23 season. In October 2023, Phillips joined Royston Town on loan for a month, before returning to Hornchurch on loan in January 2024. In February 2024, Phillips joined Heybridge Swifts on loan.

On 9 July 2024, Leyton Orient announced Phillips had signed his first professional contract with the club. On 10 September 2025, Phillips signed for National League South side Dorking Wanderers on a 28-day loan. On 19 February 2026, Phillips joined fellow National League South outfit Chelmsford City on loan. On 18 August 2026, Phillips made his first team debut for Leyton Orient, in a 1–1 draw against AFC Wimbledon in the EFL Trophy, saving a penalty as Orient won 6–5 on penalties. Four days later, Phillips made his maiden Football League appearance for Orient, coming on as a substitute for the injured Nathan Baxter in the 41st minute in a 2–0 win away at Wigan Athletic. On 16 September 2026, following the return of Baxter from injury and the loan signing of Oliver Dovin, Phillips was loaned out to National League side Gateshead.

== Personal life ==
His brother Dillon Phillips plays as a professional goalkeeper for Premier League side Hull City.
