= Jaze Kabia =

Irish footballer (born 2000)

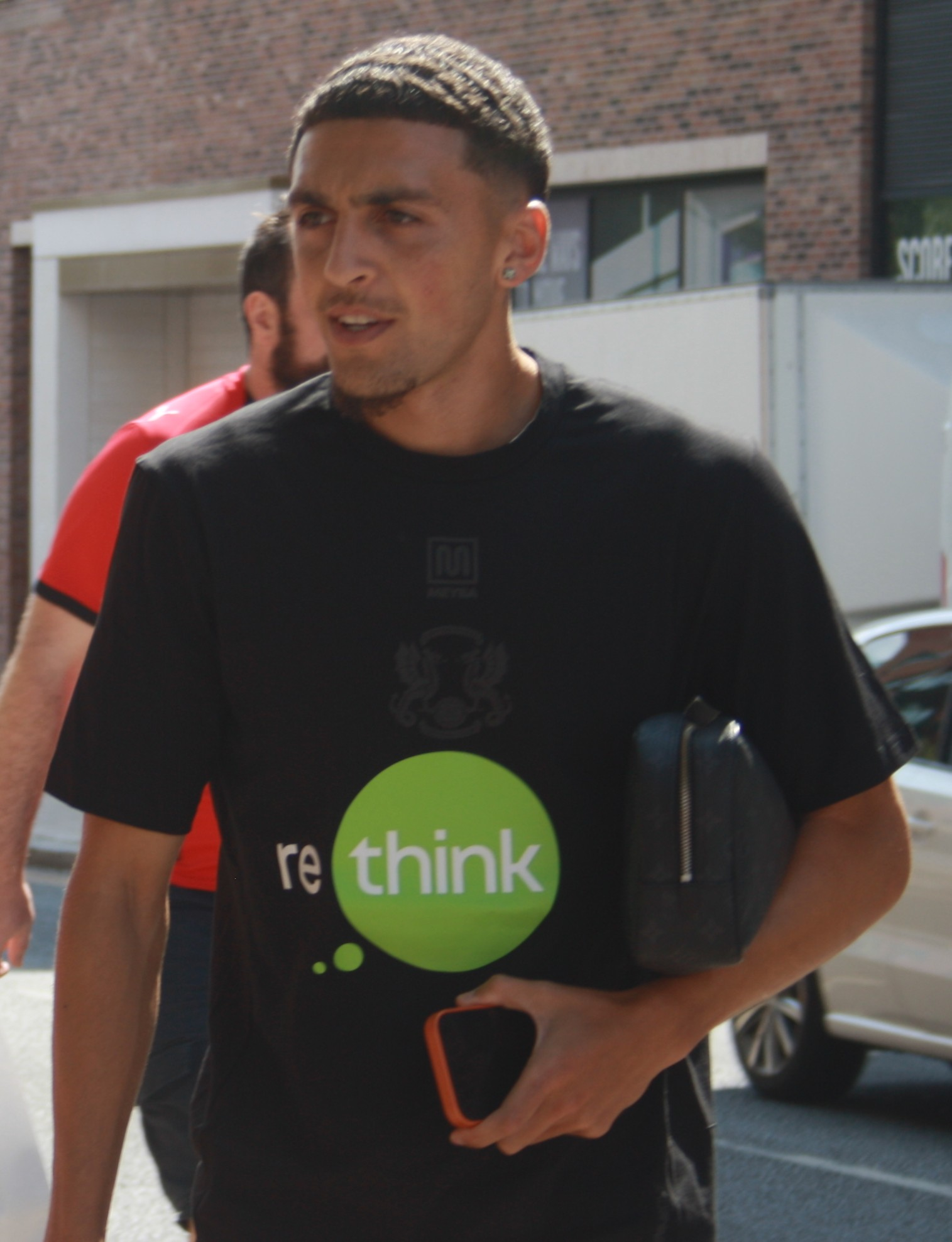
- Kabia in 2026

Personal information
- Full name: Jaze Kevin Kabia
- Date of birth: 7 August 2000 (age 26)
- Place of birth: Cork, Ireland
- Height: 1.84 m (6 ft 0 in)
- Positions: Striker; winger

Team information
- Current team: Leyton Orient
- Number: 9

Youth career
- 2005–2015: College Corinthians
- 2015–2017: Douglas Hall
- 2017: Cobh Ramblers

Senior career*
Years	Team	Apps	(Gls)
2017–2019	Cobh Ramblers	40	(12)
2019–2020	Shelbourne	16	(7)
2021–2023	Livingston	10	(1)
2022	→ Falkirk (loan)	12	(4)
2022–2023	→ Greenock Morton (loan)	18	(3)
2023	→ Queen of the South (loan)	4	(1)
2023	Cork City	9	(0)
2024	Clyde	12	(0)
2024–2025	Truro City	40	(16)
2025–2026	Grimsby Town	46	(18)
2026–	Leyton Orient	12	(4)
- * Club domestic league appearances and goals as of 14:59, 25 October 2026 (UTC)

Jaze Kevin Kabia (born 7 August 2000) is an Irish professional football player who plays as a forward for EFL League One club Leyton Orient. He started his career with Cobh Ramblers, before moving to Shelbourne, Livingston, Falkirk, Greenock Morton, Queen of the South, Cork City, Clyde, Truro City and Grimsby Town.

== Early career ==
Kabia began playing with College Corinthians in Cork where he played from age five until age 15, including two years alongside Adam Idah. He left the club to join another local side, Douglas Hall at age 15. In 2017, he made the move to one of his father Jason Kabia's old clubs, Cobh Ramblers, playing for their Under-17 side where he would play for a season.

== Club career ==
=== Cobh Ramblers ===
Kabia was called straight up to the Cobh Ramblers senior squad ahead of the 2018 League of Ireland First Division season, bypassing the club's Under-19 side. He made his debut in senior football on 9 March 2018, in a 1–0 win away to Cabinteely. On 13 April 2018, he scored his first goals in senior football, scoring a brace in a 4–1 win over Athlone Town at the Athlone Town Stadium. Kabia made three appearances in Cobh Ramblers League Cup campaign as they made it all the way to the final but were beaten by Derry City with Kabia an unused substitute on the day. He finished his first season in senior football with 26 appearances and 2 goals to his name across all competitions.

His second season saw him reach a great run of form in which he reached a tally of 9 goals in 22 appearances in all competitions. This form saw League of Ireland First Division leaders Shelbourne show an interest in him to help their promotion charge in the second half of the season.

=== Shelbourne ===
On 11 July 2019, it was announced that Kabia had signed for Dublin club Shelbourne. 8 days later, he scored on his debut in a vital 2–1 win over Athlone Town as his side's title race continued. He was sent off for the first time in his career in controversial fashion as he was shown a second yellow card for time wasting while exiting the pitch after being substituted with his side 2–0 up away to Bohemians in an FAI Cup tie. After the red card his side capitulated, losing 3–2. Kabia and Shelbourne clinched Promotion as well as the 2019 League of Ireland First Division title after beating second placed Drogheda United on 13 September 2019. He scored his first senior hat-trick in a 7–0 win over Limerick on the final night of the season, before the club were awarded the league trophy, the first of Kabia's career. He scored an impressive 5 league goals in 5 games over his half season with Shels.

Kabia started off his first season in the League of Ireland Premier Division well, scoring the winner in a 1–0 Dublin derby win over St Patrick's Athletic on 22 February 2020. Following the COVID-19 pandemic, the league season was halved in games and Shelbourne struggled for form towards the end of the season, which saw the season ended in disappointment for the club and Kabia, as they were relegated back to the League of Ireland First Division with Kabia scoring 1 goal in his 13 appearances in all competitions.

=== Livingston ===
On 8 January 2021, Kabia signed a two-and-a-half-year contract with Scottish Premiership side Livingston. Manager David Martindale stated on the day he signed that the club would look at possibly loaning him out for experience. He made his debut on 20 January 2021, in a 2–2 draw with Celtic at the Tony Macaroni Arena. He was heavily involved in the action on his debut as Celtic captain Scott Brown received a straight red card for striking Kabia in the face, while he earned praise from his manager who stated that Kabia has 'massive potential'. On 27 January 2021, he scored his first goal for the club, coming off the bench to open the scoring in the 89th minute of a 2–0 win over Kilmarnock.

==== Falkirk (loan) ====
On 21 January 2022, Kabia joined Scottish League One club Falkirk on loan until the end of the season. He made his debut the following day, coming off the bench to score two second-half goals as Falkirk beat East Fife 2-0.

==== Greenock Morton (loan) ====
On 7 July 2022, Kabia joined Scottish Championship club Greenock Morton on a season-long loan. He would be recalled by his parent club in January 2023.

==== Queen of the South (loan) ====
On 27 January 2023, Kabia joined Scottish League One club Queen of the South on loan until the end of the season.

=== Cork City ===
On 25 July 2023, Kabia signed for his hometown club Cork City, returning to the League of Ireland Premier Division with the first Irish club his father Jason played for. He made 13 appearances in all competitions by the end of the season, as the club were relegated to the League of Ireland First Division.

=== Clyde ===
On 30 January 2024, it was announced that Kabia had signed for Scottish League Two side Clyde.

=== Truro City ===
In August 2024, Kabia joined National League South club Truro City following a successful trial period. On 26 August 2024, Kabia scored a hat-trick in a 5–0 win over Worthing. He scored 16 league goals in 44 appearances over the season as his side won the 2024–25 National League South title.

=== Grimsby Town ===
On 1 July 2025, it was announced that Kabia had signed for EFL League Two team Grimsby Town on a two-year deal. He scored on his league debut on the opening day of the season on 2 August 2025 against Crawley Town, scoring from the penalty spot for Grimsby's first goal in a 3–0 win and netted the only goal in Grimsby's third-round Carabao Cup win at Hillsborough on 16 September 2025. Kabia scored 24 goals in 57 appearances in all competitions in an impressive debut campaign with the club in 2025–26, as his side were defeated in the playoffs by Salford City.

=== Leyton Orient ===
On 7 August 2026, Kabia signed for EFL League One side Leyton Orient on a three-year deal for an undisclosed record club fee.

== Personal life ==
Jaze Kabia is the son of Jason Kabia, a former professional footballer who played in England, Malta and Ireland, finishing his career with his son's first professional club, Cobh Ramblers. He is also best friends with Republic of Ireland striker Adam Idah since childhood, with the pair knowing each other since the age of 7 and playing on various teams together.

== Career statistics ==
As of match played on 18 August 2026

Appearances and goals by club, season and competition
Club	Division	Season	League		National Cup (Note: Includes FAI Cup, Scottish Cup & FA Cup)		League Cup (Note: Includes League of Ireland Cup, Scottish League Cup & EFL Cup)		Other		Total	
Club	Division	Season	Apps	Goals	Apps	Goals	Apps	Goals	Apps	Goals	Apps	Goals
Cobh Ramblers	2018	LOI First Division	22	2	1	0	3	0	—		26	2
Cobh Ramblers	2019	LOI First Division	18	8	—		2	1	2 (Note: Appearances in the Munster Senior Cup)	0	22	9
Cobh Ramblers	Total		40	10	1	0	5	1	2	0	48	11
Shelbourne	2019	LOI First Division	5	5	1	0	—		—		6	5
Shelbourne	2020	LOI Premier Division	11	1	1	0	—		1 (Note: Appearances in the League of Ireland Promotion/relegation play-off)	0	13	1
Shelbourne	Total		16	6	2	0	—		1	0	19	6
Livingston	2020–21	Scottish Premiership	8	1	1	0	0	0	—		9	1
Livingston	2021–22	Scottish Premiership	1	0	0	0	2	0	—		3	0
Livingston	2022–23	Scottish Premiership	0	0	—		—		—		0	0
Livingston	Total		9	1	1	0	2	0	0	0	12	1
Falkirk (loan)	2021–22	Scottish League One	12	4	—		—		—		12	4
Greenock Morton (loan)	2022–23	Scottish Championship	18	3	1	0	4	1	2 (Note: Appearances in the Scottish Challenge Cup)	0	25	4
Queen of the South (loan)	2022–23	Scottish League One	4	1	—		—		—		4	1
Cork City	2023	LOI Premier Division	9	0	2	0	—		2 (Note: 1 appearance in the Munster Senior Cup & 1 appearance in the 2023 League of Ireland Premier Division Play-off)	0	13	0
Clyde	2023–24	Scottish League Two	12	0	—		—		—		12	0
Truro City	2024–25	National League South	44	16	1	0	—		1 (Note: Appearances in the FA Trophy)	0	46	16
Grimsby Town	2025–26	EFL League Two	46	18	4	3	4	2	3 (Note: 1 appearance in the EFL Trophy; 2 appearances, 1 goal in the 2026 EFL League Two Playoffs)	1	57	24
Leyton Orient	2026–27	EFL League One	1	0	0	0	1	0	1 (Note: Appearances in the EFL Trophy)	1	3	1
Career total			209	50	12	3	16	4	11	2	248	62

== Honours ==
Shelbourne

- League of Ireland First Division: 2019

Truro City

- National League South: 2024–25
