= Tony Springett =

Footballer (born 2002)

- Springett playing for Leyton Orient in 2026

Personal information
- Full name: Tony Gary Springett
- Date of birth: 22 September 2002 (age 24)
- Place of birth: Lewisham, England
- Height: 1.74 m (5 ft 9 in)
- Position: Winger

Team information
- Current team: Leyton Orient
- Number: 27

Youth career
- 2014–2022: Norwich City

Senior career*
Years	Team	Apps	(Gls)
2022–2026	Norwich City	29	(0)
2023	→ Derby County (loan)	10	(0)
2024	→ Northampton Town (loan)	13	(1)
2026–	Leyton Orient	9	(1)

International career^{‡}
2019	Republic of Ireland U18	1	(0)
2023–2024	Republic of Ireland U21	5	(0)
- * Club domestic league appearances and goals as of 22:08, 7 November 2026 (UTC) ‡ National team caps and goals as of 01:21, 16 October 2024 (UTC)

Tony Gary Springett (born 22 September 2002) is a professional footballer who plays as a winger for EFL League One club Leyton Orient. Born in England, he has represented the Republic of Ireland internationally at youth level.

== Club career ==
=== Norwich City ===
Springett joined Norwich City at the age of 12. On 8 May 2022, Springett made his debut for Norwich, coming on as a half-time substitute in a 4–0 Premier League loss against West Ham United.

In January 2023 he moved on loan to Derby County for the remainder of the season. He made 11 appearances for The Rams, with an ankle injury in March 2023 ending his season early.

On 15 January 2024, Springett returned to League One when he joined Northampton Town on loan until the end of the season.

On 11 January 2026, he scored his first goal for Norwich City in a 5–1 victory over Walsall in the third round of the FA Cup.

On 24 April 2026, Norwich announced that Springett would leave the club at the end of his contract that summer.

=== Leyton Orient ===
On 11 June 2026, Springett joined League One side Leyton Orient on a free transfer.

== International career ==
Born in London, Springett was called up for the Republic of Ireland's under-18 squad for a four team tournament in Sweden in September 2019. On 31 August 2023, Springett received his first call up to the Republic of Ireland U21 squad for their 2025 UEFA European Under-21 Championship qualification fixtures against Turkey U21 and San Marino U21. On 8 September 2023, he made his Republic of Ireland U21 debut, in a 3–2 win over Turkey U21 at Turners Cross, assisting Aidomo Emakhu's 96th-minute winner.

== Career statistics ==
As of match played 7 November 2026

Appearances and goals by club, season and competition
Club	Season	League			FA Cup		League Cup		Other		Total	
Club	Season	Division	Apps	Goals	Apps	Goals	Apps	Goals	Apps	Goals	Apps	Goals
Norwich City U21	2020–21	—			—		—		2 (Note: Appearances in EFL Trophy)	0	2	0
Norwich City	2021–22	Premier League	3	0	0	0	0	0	—		3	0
Norwich City	2022–23	Championship	1	0	—		1	0	—		2	0
Norwich City	2023–24	Championship	10	0	0	0	3	0	—		13	0
Norwich City	2024–25	Championship	0	0	0	0	0	0	—		0	0
Norwich City	2025–26	Championship	15	0	1	1	0	0	—		16	1
Norwich City	Total		29	0	1	1	4	0	—		34	1
Derby County (loan)	2022–23	League One	10	0	1	0	—		—		11	0
Northampton Town (loan)	2023–24	League One	13	1	—		—		—		13	1
Leyton Orient	2026–27	League One	9	1	1	1	2	0	2	0	14	2
Leyton Orient	Total		9	1	1	1	2	0	2	0	14	2
Career total			61	2	3	2	6	0	4	0	73	4
