= Charlie Wellens =

English footballer (born 2002)

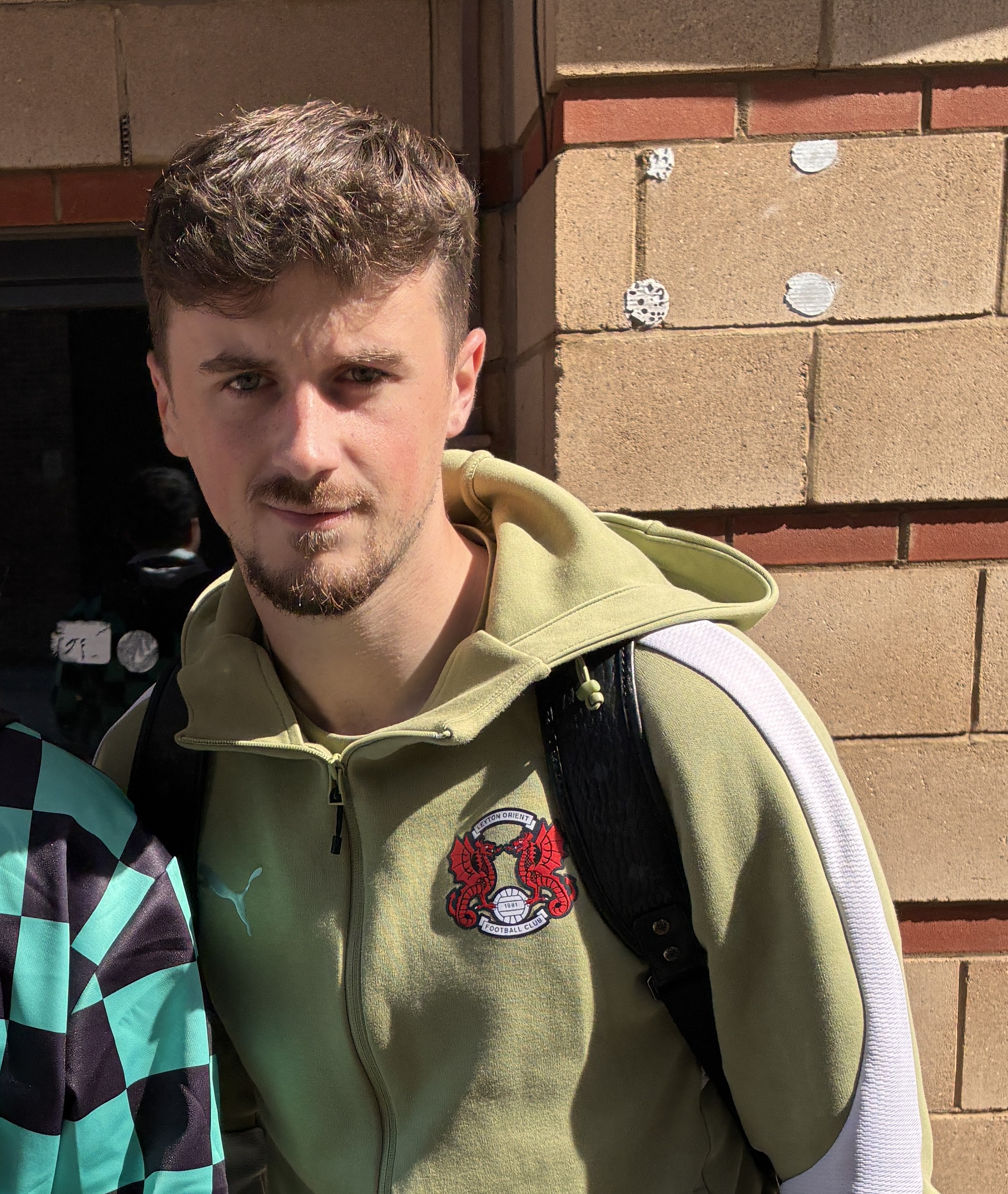
- Wellens in 2026

Personal information
- Full name: Charlie Gerard Richard Wellens
- Date of birth: 5 December 2002 (age 23)
- Place of birth: Salford, England
- Height: 1.75 m (5 ft 9 in)
- Position: Midfielder

Team information
- Current team: Leyton Orient
- Number: 25

Youth career
- –2021: Manchester United

Senior career*
Years	Team	Apps	(Gls)
2021–2023	Manchester United	0	(0)
2022–2023	→ Oldham Athletic (loan)	6	(1)
2023–2025	Reading	0	(0)
2025–	Leyton Orient	44	(2)
- * Club domestic league appearances and goals as of 18:34, 24 October 2026 (UTC)

Charlie Gerard Richard Wellens (born 5 December 2002) is an English professional footballer who plays as a midfielder for EFL League One club Leyton Orient.

== Club career ==
=== Manchester United and Oldham loan ===
Wellens signed his first professional contract with Manchester United in May 2020. He made his debut for the U21 side in the EFL Trophy match against Rochdale in the 2020–21 season, and starting all 3 group games in the 2021-22 season. In September 2022, Wellens joined Oldham Athletic on loan, making 6 league appearances and scoring one goal, leaving in January 2023.

=== Reading ===
On 1 September 2023, Wellens joined League One side Reading on an initial one-year contract with their U21 side, extending for a further year. He made his debut for the club in a 5–2 EFL Trophy win against Arsenal under-21s in November 2023. Wellens left the club in May 2025 having only made 3 appearances in the EFL Trophy.

=== Leyton Orient ===
On 12 August 2025, Wellens teamed up with his father Richie and signed for Leyton Orient on a short-term contract until January 2026, making his league debut against Northampton Town in a 1–0 defeat. He scored his first goal for Orient in the EFL Trophy against Peterborough United with a 30-yard free kick in September 2025. Wellens followed this with a 95th-minute winner against Port Vale F.C. in a 3–2 victory the next game, scoring his first EFL League 1 goal. He scored twice for Orient in nine games before extending his contract until the end of the 2026–27 season.

== Personal life ==
Wellens is the son of Leyton Orient manager Richie Wellens.

== Career statistics ==
As of match played 25 August 2026

Appearances and goals by club, season and competition
Club	Season	League			FA Cup		EFL Cup		Other		Total	
Club	Season	Division	Apps	Goals	Apps	Goals	Apps	Goals	Apps	Goals	Apps	Goals
Manchester United U21	2020–21	—			—		—		1 (Note: Appearance(s) in EFL Trophy)	0	1	0
Manchester United U21	2021–22	—			—		—		3	0	3	0
Manchester United U21	2022–23	—			—		—		0	0	0	0
Manchester United U21	Total		—		—		—		4	0	4	0
Oldham Athletic (loan)	2022–23	National League	6	1	0	0	—		0	0	6	1
Reading	2023–24	League One	0	0	0	0	0	0	1	0	1	0
Reading	2024–25	League One	0	0	0	0	0	0	2	0	2	0
Reading	Total		0	0	0	0	0	0	3	0	3	0
Leyton Orient	2025–26	League One	36	2	1	0	1	0	4	1	43	3
Leyton Orient	2026–27	League One	1	0	0	0	2	0	1	0	4	0
Leyton Orient	Total		37	2	1	0	3	0	5	1	45	3
Career total			43	3	1	0	3	0	12	1	57	4
