= Tariq Al-Sadi =

Omani footballer (born 2006)

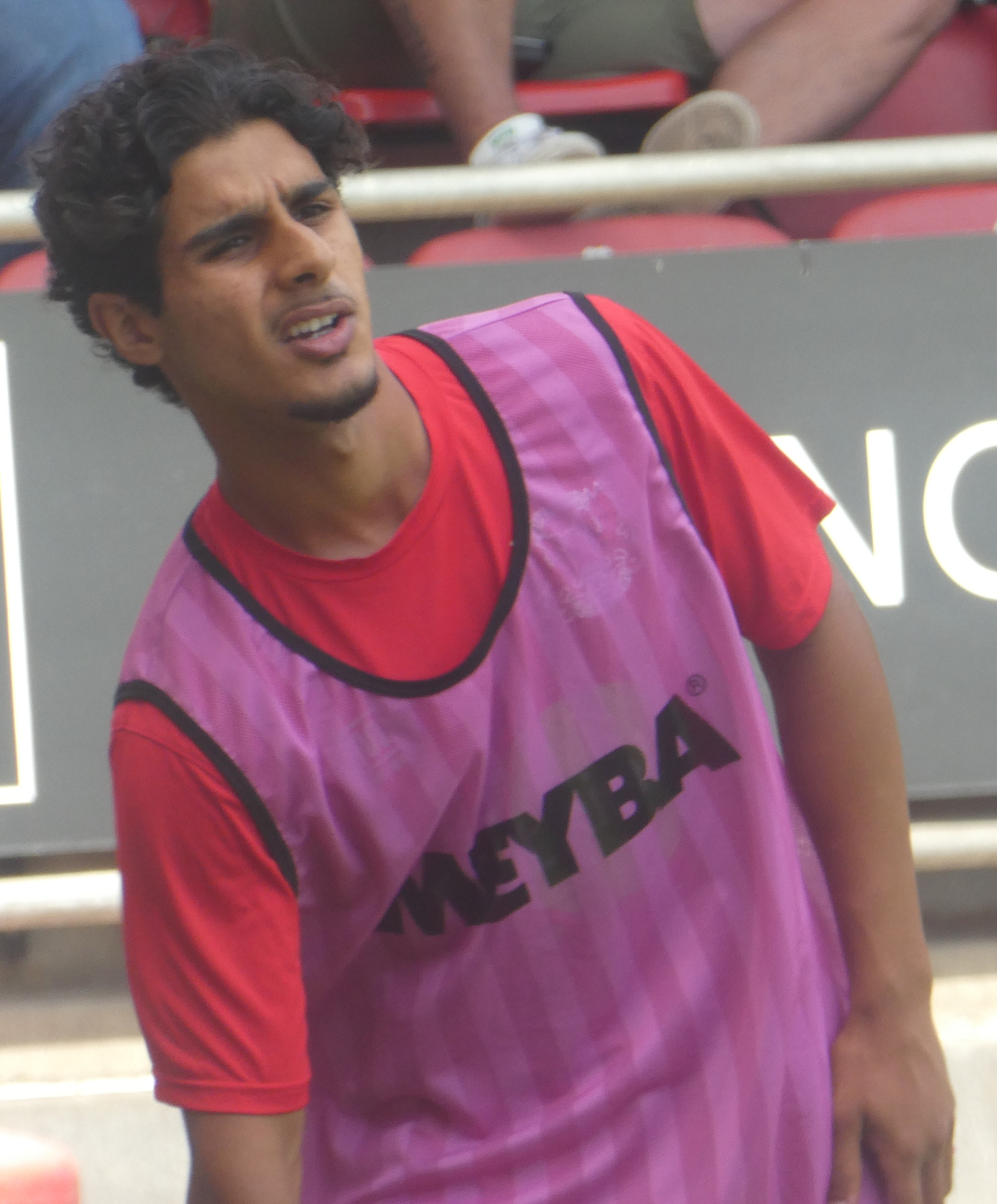
- Al-Sadi in 2026

Personal information
- Full name: Tariq Khalifa Salim Al-Sadi
- Date of birth: 27 July 2006 (age 20)
- Place of birth: Oman
- Position: Forward

Team information
- Current team: Enfield Town (on loan from Leyton Orient)
- Number: 35

Youth career
- 2014–2016: Muscat Football Academy
- 2016–2017: Birmingham City
- 2017–2018: Aston Villa
- Wolverhampton Wanderers
- Langley

Senior career*
Years	Team	Apps	(Gls)
2023	Langley	13	(3)
2023–2024	Southall	5	(0)
2024	Leyton Orient	0	(0)
2024–2025	Sant Andreu	0	(0)
2026–	Leyton Orient	0	(0)
2026–	→ Enfield Town (loan)	7	(4)

International career^{‡}
2025–	Oman	2	(1)
- * Club domestic league appearances and goals as of 17:04, 18 November 2026 (UTC) ‡ National team caps and goals as of 12:47, 7 August 2026 (UTC)

Tariq Khalifa Salim Al-Sadi (Arabic: طارق بن خليفة السعدي; born 27 June 2006) is an Omani footballer who plays as a forward for Enfield Town on loan from EFL League One club Leyton Orient.

== Club career ==
=== Early life ===
Al-Sadi first took an interest in football at the age of three, and at the age of six, his father moved him from Suwayq to Oman's capital, Muscat to pursue a career in the sport. He played for a number of academies, before settling at the Muscat Football Academy, where he stayed for two years, competing in international tournaments and winning individual awards for his performances. These performances reportedly attracted the attention of Emirati side Al-Wasl.

=== Early career ===
At the age of nine, Al-Sadi travelled to England, going on trial with professional sides Birmingham City and Fulham. After impressing at both, he returned for a second trial with Birmingham City in January 2016, and in July of the same year, his family moved to England, and he began formally training with the West Midlands side. His father states that he sold "everything he owned" to move to England two years after his son.

After six months training with Birmingham City, the club informed Al-Sadi's family that the FA refused to register him due to his young age and status as a non-British citizen. He continued to train with the youth sides, but after the club's appeals to the FA were unsuccessful, he went to Manchester City, who were reportedly ready to sign him without taking him on trial, until the FA stepped in and issued the club a warning.

In June 2017, he competed in Chelsea's "Asian Star" initiative, winning a special award in the under-11 category. In December of the same year, Al-Sadi signed for Aston Villa on a three-year deal. During his time with Aston Villa, he was invited to join French club Lens and Belgian side Anderlecht.

After only a year with Aston Villa, his family asked to cancel the contract prematurely, with the aim of moving to Wolverhampton Wanderers. While at Wolverhampton Wanderers, he applied to register with the FA, having resided in England for five years.

=== Langley and Southall ===
In October 2022, while playing for Langley, he went on trial with Chelsea, featuring on the bench for the club's under-18 side. Having returned to Langley, he would make his senior debut in the Combined Counties Football League Division One on 28 January 2023, coming on as a substitute for Celeany Filho in a 5–1 win against Bagshot. The following season, he was playing for Southall in the Isthmian League.

=== Leyton Orient ===
Al-Sadi joined the academy of League One club Leyton Orient at the age of seventeen in January 2024. Despite the club offering him a professional contract once he turned eighteen, The Football Association's regulations on work permits for foreign players prevented him from being registered. As a result, he spent the 2024–25 season with Spanish club Sant Andreu, where he featured for their academy in the Liga Nacional – Spain's second division for youth clubs.

He returned to England, and was involved in Leyton Orient's pre-season preparation; notching an assist in the club's 4–1 win against Enfield Town on 10 July 2026. The next day, he was included in the travelling squad to Leyton Orient's training camp in Spain. He scored the first goal in Leyton Orient's 2–0 win against Lincoln City on 18 July. On 2 August 2026, after successfully applying for a work permit, Leyton Orient announced that Al-Sadi had signed for the club on a short-term contract until February 2027.

== International career ==
Called up to the Oman squad for the first time in May 2025, Al-Sadi marked his senior international debut with a goal against Niger; after cutting in from the right, he was tripped by a Niger defender inside the box, and went on to score the resulting penalty kick.

== Style of play ==
Muscat Football Academy founder, Chuck Martini - a Moroccan former goalkeeper, described Al-Sadi as a "little Messi", noted for his tricks and skills, as well as his goalscoring ability.

== Career statistics ==
=== Club ===
As of match played 6 October 2026

Appearances and goals by club, season and competition
Club	Season	League			National cup (Note: Includes FA Cup)		Other		Total	
Club	Season	Division	Apps	Goals	Apps	Goals	Apps	Goals	Apps	Goals
Langley	2022–23	CCFL Division One	13	3	0	0	4 (Note: Two appearances and one goal in the CCFL Division One playoffs, two appearances in the CCFL Division One Challenge Cup)	1	17	4
Langley	2023–24	CCFL Division One	0	0	0	0	1 (Note: Appearance in FA Vase)	0	1	0
Langley	Total		13	3	0	0	5	1	18	4
Southall	2023–24	Isthmian League South Central	5	0	0	0	0	0	5	0
Leyton Orient	2023–24	EFL League One	0	0	0	0	0	0	0	0
Sant Andreu	2024–25	Segunda Federación	0	0	0	0	0	0	0	0
Leyton Orient	2026–27	EFL League One	0	0	0	0	0	0	0	0
Enfield Town (loan)	2026–27	Isthmian League Premier Division	3	1	0	0	1 (Note: Appearance in FA Trophy)	2	4	3
Career total			21	4	0	0	6	3	27	7

=== International ===
As of matches played 7 August 2026

National team	Year	Apps	Goals
Oman	2025	2	1
Total		2	1

=== International goals ===
Scores and results list Oman’s goal tally first, score column indicates score after each Al-Sadi goal.

List of international goals scored by Tariq Al-Sadi
No.	Date	Venue	Opponent	Score	Result	Competition
1	20 May 2025	Sultan Qaboos Sports Complex, Muscat, Oman	Niger	1–0	4–1	Friendly
