= James Morris (footballer, born 2001) =

English footballer (born 2001)

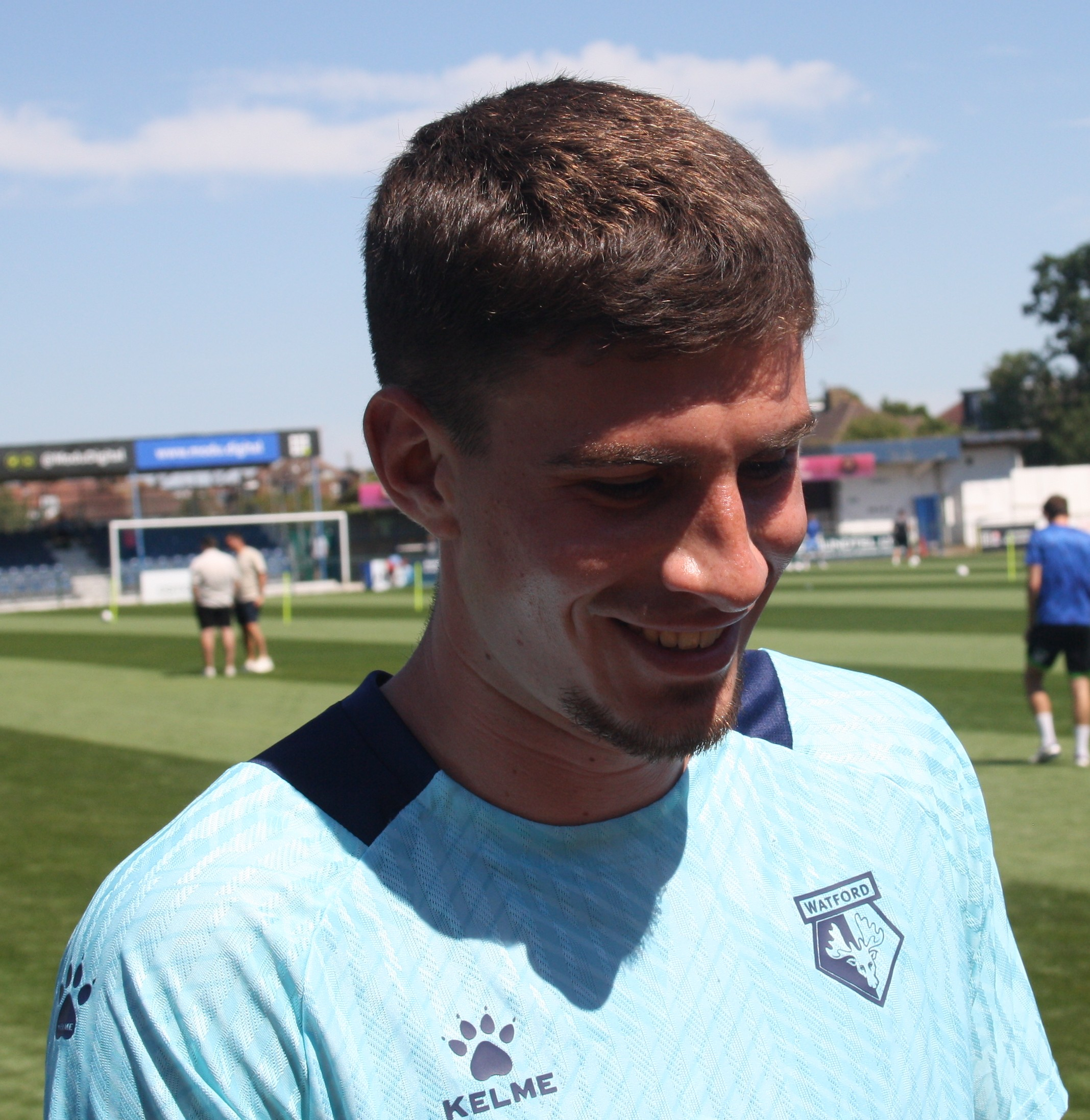
- Morris in 2025

Personal information
- Full name: James William Morris
- Date of birth: 23 November 2001 (age 24)
- Place of birth: Portsmouth, England
- Height: 1.83 m (6 ft 0 in)
- Position: Left-back

Team information
- Current team: Leyton Orient
- Number: 3

Youth career
- 2011–2020: Southampton

Senior career*
Years	Team	Apps	(Gls)
2020–2021	Southampton	0	(0)
2021–2026	Watford	44	(0)
2026–	Leyton Orient	24	(2)
- * Club domestic league appearances and goals as of 20:00, 25 October 2026 (UTC)

James William Morris (born 23 November 2001) is an English professional footballer who plays as a left-back for League One club Leyton Orient.

== Career ==
=== Southampton ===
Morris signed his first professional contract with Southampton in August 2020, having been with his boyhood club since joining at Under-10's.

On 4 June 2021, Southampton announced their retained list which confirmed Morris had been released.

=== Watford ===
Having impressed while on trial, Morris signed for Watford on a one-year contract with the option of another year on 2 August 2021.

Morris made his professional debut in the FA Cup third round against Leicester City on 8 January 2022, playing the full 90 minutes in a 4–1 defeat.

In March 2022, Morris signed a new two-year deal with the club and the following April signed an extension until the summer of 2026.

=== Leyton Orient ===
On 2 February 2026, Morris joined League One club Leyton Orient on an initial two-and-a-half year deal.

== Career statistics ==
As of 15 August 2026

Appearances and goals by club, season and competition
Club	Season	League			FA Cup		EFL Cup		Other		Total	
Club	Season	Division	Apps	Goals	Apps	Goals	Apps	Goals	Apps	Goals	Apps	Goals
Watford	2021–22	Premier League	0	0	1	0	0	0	0	0	1	0
Watford	2022–23	Championship	12	0	1	0	1	0	0	0	14	0
Watford	2023–24	Championship	12	0	3	0	1	0	0	0	16	0
Watford	2024–25	Championship	18	0	0	0	3	0	0	0	21	0
Watford	2025–26	Championship	2	0	1	0	0	0	0	0	3	0
Watford	Total		44	0	6	0	5	0	0	0	55	0
Leyton Orient	2025–26	League One	17	2	0	0	0	0	0	0	17	2
Leyton Orient	2026–27	League One	1	0	0	0	1	0	0	0	2	0
Leyton Orient	Total		18	2	0	0	1	0	0	0	19	2
Career total			62	2	6	0	6	0	0	0	74	0
