= Nigel Travis =

English businessman and corporate executive

- Born: c. 1950 (age 75–76); London, England, United Kingdom
- Citizenship: British and American
- Education: Middlesex University
- Occupation: Business executive
- Known for: Former CEO of Dunkin' Donuts
- Board member of: Chairman of Dunkin' Brands
- Spouse: Joanna Travis (second wife)
- Children: 3

Nigel Travis is a British businessman and corporate executive. Travis was the CEO of the Dunkin' Brands group from January 2009 to July 2018. He has served the board at other corporations, including Papa John's and Blockbuster.

== Early life and education ==
Travis was born in Woodford, East London, into an entrepreneurial family. His father had several businesses including a uniform business, a twine and rope wholesaling business, and a toy distribution business. Travis graduated from Middlesex University with a bachelor's degree in business administration.

== Career ==
He started his career by working for Esso, Rolls-Royce, Kraft and Parker Hannifin in the field of human resources.

In 1985 he joined the conglomerate Grand Metropolitan in human resources and in 1986 became Group management development director. Following the acquisition of Pillsbury and Burger King by Grand Metropolitan in late 1988 he moved to Miami, Florida where he joined Burger King as SVP, Human Resources. In 1991 he returned to England in his first operations role with Burger King as managing director for Europe, Middle East & Africa.

=== Blockbuster ===
Nigel joined Blockbuster. in 1994 as Senior Vice President, Europe and over the next 10 years was promoted to various positions which included both US and International retail operations.

In 2001, Travis was promoted by Blockbuster as president and chief operating officer (the number two position) and stayed in that role for three years. In 2005, he was hired by Papa John's Pizza to serve as president and CEO.

=== Dunkin' Brands ===
In 2008, Travis was hired by Dunkin' Brands to lead as its CEO. Dunkin’ Brands became a publicly held company in 2011 (DNKN). During Travis's time at Dunkin' Brands, the company added 3,300 new Dunkin' Donuts and Baskin-Robbins shops. In 2010, Travis said his vision was continually to expand Dunkin' Brand's presence in the Southeastern United States and internationally, and that China would be a major focus. He retired from Dunkin’ in December 2018.

=== Retirement ===
Travis served as chairman, Dunkin’ Brands until December 2020. He is a member of the board of directors for Advance Auto Parts and Abercrombie & Fitch. He is also Chairman of Fooda based in Chicago and the former chairman for Servpro.

== Personal life ==
Nigel Travis has been a fan of the English football club Leyton Orient F.C. since he was a young boy. In June 2017, he led a consortium that rescued the club. He is married to Joanna Travis and has two children with her, Ian and Brooke Travis. He has a son, David Travis, from a prior marriage.
