= Leyton Orient F.C. =

Association football club in Leyton, England

Leyton Orient
- Full name: Leyton Orient Football Club
- Nickname: The O's
- Founded: 1881; 145 years ago
- Ground: Brisbane Road
- Capacity: 9,271
- Owner: David Gandler (via GSG LOFC Limited)
- Chairman: Nigel Travis
- Head coach: Richie Wellens
- League: EFL League One
- 2025–26: EFL League One, 20th of 24
- Website: leytonorient.com
| Home colours | Away colours | Third colours |

Leyton Orient Football Club, commonly referred to as Orient, is a professional association football club based in Leyton, Waltham Forest, London, England. The team compete in EFL League One, the third level of the English football league system.

Founded in 1881 as the Glyn Cricket Club, they began playing football as Orient in 1888 and joined the London League in 1896 after success in the Clapton & District League. The club adopted the name Clapton Orient two years later and were elected into the Football League in 1905. Relegated out of the Second Division in 1929, the club adopted the name Leyton Orient after World War II. They won the Third Division South title in 1955–56 and secured promotion out of the Second Division in 1961–62, though were relegated out of the First Division after just one season, and suffered a further relegation in 1966. That summer the club's name changed to Orient F.C. and they went on to win the Third Division under the stewardship of Jimmy Bloomfield in 1969–70. Orient spent the 1970s playing in the second tier, winning two London Challenge Cups and reaching the 1977 Anglo-Scottish Cup final and 1977–78 FA Cup semi-finals, before being relegated in 1982 and again in 1985.

In 1987 the club reverted to being Leyton Orient again. They won promotion out of the Fourth Division via the play-offs in 1988–89, though were relegated again in 1995. Orient gained promotion out of League Two with Martin Ling in 2005–06, before Hearn sold the club to Italian businessman Francesco Becchetti, who presided over two relegations in three years under 11 managers, taking the club out of the Football League for the first time in 112 years. Nigel Travis took over running the club in 2017 and appointed Justin Edinburgh as manager, and under this stable leadership the club went on to reach the FA Trophy final and win promotion back into the Football League as champions of the National League in 2018–19. Under manager Richie Wellens, the club was crowned champions of League Two in the 2022–23 campaign.

They are the second oldest football club in London to play at a professional level, and are known to their fans by their nickname "the O's". The club's current home colours are all red with white braces. They have played home matches at Brisbane Road since 1937, having previously played at Millfields and Lea Bridge Road.

Leyton Orient Football Club Limited is owned by majority shareholders GSG LOFC Limited, headed by David Gandler.

== History ==
=== Formation and name (1881–1914) ===
Leyton Orient were originally formed by members of the Glyn Cricket Club in 1881, many of whom were former students of the Independent College, Homerton in nearby Hackney (now Homerton College in Cambridge); an annual fixture is still held between the club and the college. The team has had several name changes since, first as Eagle Cricket Club in 1886, then as Orient Football Club in 1888.

The choice of the name Orient came about at the behest of a player, Jack R Dearing, who was an employee of the Orient Steam Navigation Company, later part of P&O. It was suggested that the name would bring an air of mystique to the club, while also referencing their location in the 'east' end of London. The club's name was changed again to Clapton Orient in 1898 to represent the area of London in which they played, though there was another team called Clapton F.C.

Before their relegation in 2017, the O's were the second-oldest league club in London behind Fulham and were the 24th oldest club currently playing in the Football League. Following Fulham's promotion to the Premier League they became the oldest London club playing in the Football League. They played in the Second Division of the Southern Federation's League in 1904, joining the Football League in 1905. By this time players such as part-time outside right, Herbert Kingaby could earn £2 4s (2012: £161) per week – payment being somewhat sporadic.

The name Leyton Orient was adopted following the conclusion of the Second World War. The club had moved to Leyton in 1937, though again there was another team called Leyton F.C. A further rename back simply to Orient took place in 1966 after the Municipal Borough of Leyton (in Essex) was absorbed into the London Borough of Waltham Forest. That renaming followed a financial crisis – one of several to hit the club and by no means the first or last – and restructuring of the company behind the club; this is remembered for a "pass the bucket" collection that took place at a special meeting of supporters in the East Stand, when complete closure was claimed to be a definite possibility.

The club reverted to Leyton Orient in 1987, shortly after Tony Wood took over as chairman and at a time when a supporters' campaign was taking place in the Leyton Orientear fanzine to reinstate the Leyton part of the club's name.

=== World War years (1914–1955) ===
The 1914–15 season was the last football season before the league was suspended due to the outbreak of the First World War. A total of 41 members of the Clapton Orient team and staff joined up into the 17th Battalion Middlesex Regiment (the Footballers' Battalion), the highest of any football team in the country and the first to join up en masse. At the final game of the season – Clapton Orient vs Leicester Fosse, 20,000 people came out to support the team. A farewell parade was also hosted but not before the O's had won 2–0. The British Film Institute holds a brief recording of this historic match and parade in its archives.

Chart of table positions of Leyton Orient in the Football League.

During the Battle of the Somme, three players gave their lives for king and country: Richard McFadden, George Scott and William Jonas. Though they were the only Orient staff to have died during the First World War, many others sustained wounds, some more than once and were not able to resume their football careers after the war. Prior to the First World War and whilst on a training run, O's striker McFadden had saved the lives of two young boys who were drowning in the River Lea – this, only a week or so after rescuing a little girl from a house fire, when walking through Clapton Park on his way to the O's ground. It is also documented that he had dragged a man from a burning building prior to signing for the Orient.

History was made on Saturday 30 April 1921 when the Prince of Wales, later to become King Edward VIII, visited Clapton Stadium/Millfields Road to see the O's play Notts County. The Orient won 3–0 and this was the first time a member of royalty had attended a Football League match. The royal visit was to show gratitude for Clapton Orient's patriotic example during the Great War and there is now a plaque erected on the site of the Millfields Road Stadium to commemorate this historic event.

=== Later 20th century (1955–2001) ===
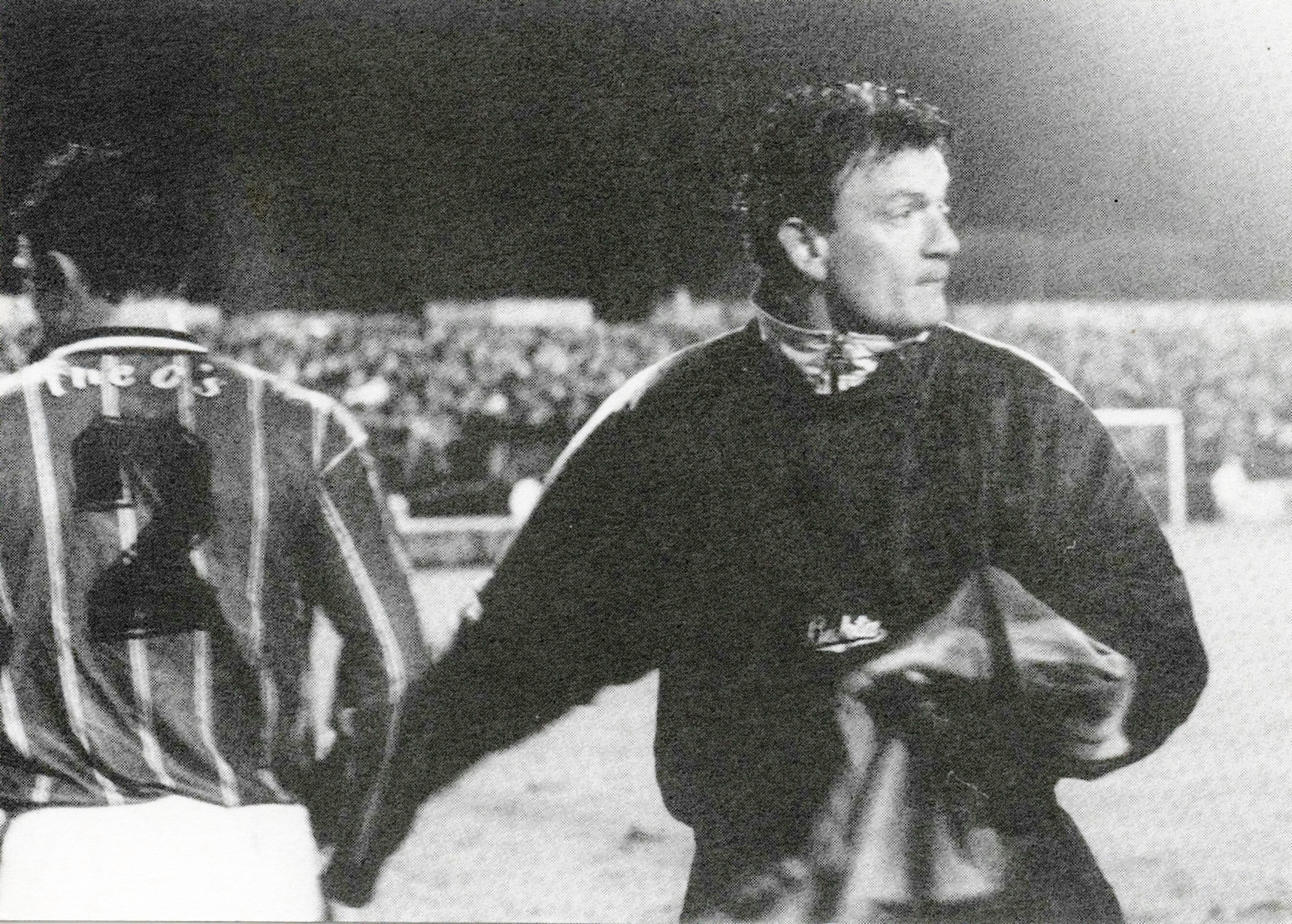
Manager John Sitton, from documentary "Orient – Club for a Fiver", made in 1995 by producer/director Jo Treharne for Open Media and Channel 4

Leyton Orient were Division Three South champions in the 1955–56 season and spent 20 of the next 25 years in the Second Division, before being relegated at the end of the 1981–82 season. They have not been back to that level since.

Orient's golden years were in the 1960s and 1970s. In the 1961–62 season Orient were promoted to the top tier of English football, the First Division, for the only time in their history, after finishing second in Division Two under the management of Johnny Carey. The team struggled in the top flight and were relegated after just one season. Nonetheless, they did defeat local rivals West Ham United at home.

They were Division Three champions in the 1969–70 season and spent the whole of the 1970s in Division Two. In 1972 Orient achieved one of the most famous results in their history – coming back from 2–0 down to beat Chelsea 3–2 in the FA Cup fifth round. On 28 August 1973, Bobby Fisher became the first black player to represent Orient, and would go on to play 384 times for the club. They were also Anglo-Scottish Cup runners-up in 1976–77. In 1978 Orient were defeated in the semi-final of the FA Cup, the furthest they have progressed in that competition.

In 1978 the club was indirectly responsible for the album Variations composed by Andrew Lloyd Webber for his brother, the cellist Julian Lloyd Webber. This reached number two in the UK albums chart. Variations came about as the result of a bet between the two brothers on the outcome of Orient's final game of the 1976–77 season against Hull City.

In the 1980s Leyton Orient fared less well and after two relegations found themselves in the fourth tier of English football. However, they ended the decade on a high, as they were promoted in the 1988–89 season, when under manager Frank Clark they were promoted in the Division Four play-off final after a 2–1 aggregate victory over Wrexham. The early 1990s saw steady progress in the Third Division, missing out on a play-off place in the 1992–93 season on goal difference. However, the financial crisis at the club caused by then-chairman Tony Wood losing his business in the Rwandan Civil War led to a relegation back to the fourth tier, now renamed as the Third Division following the formation of the Premier League. Barry Hearn became chairman in 1995 after the club was put on sale for £5 by then-chairman Tony Wood, a period covered by the television documentary Orient: Club for a Fiver (made by production company Open Media for Channel 4 and listed in Forbes magazine in 2020 as one of its "Top Five Sports Documentaries").

Under manager Tommy Taylor, Orient were defeated in the 1999 and 2001 Third Division play-off finals, played at Wembley Stadium and the Millennium Stadium respectively. The latter final saw the fastest ever play-off final goal scored to date at the Millennium Stadium, as Orient's Chris Tate scored after just 27 seconds. Orient's fastest ever goal was scored after just 12 seconds by Lee Steele in a match against his former club Oxford at The Kassam Stadium on 28 March 2005.

=== Promotion to League One (2001–2010) ===
After the 2001 play-off final defeat, Leyton Orient took several years to recover from their second play-off final defeat in three years. After Tommy Taylor left the club, Paul Brush spent two unsuccessful years in charge and after he was sacked, former player Martin Ling took over as manager in October 2003, with Orient second-bottom of the league. After several years of steady improvement, Leyton Orient gained promotion in the 2005–06 season, finishing in third place and gaining automatic promotion to League One. This was the club's first automatic promotion in 36 years and ended a period of 11 years in the English league's bottom division. This promotion season also saw Leyton Orient progressing to the fourth round of the FA Cup after defeating Premiership side Fulham. Promotion was only secured in the final minutes of the final game of the season, away at Oxford United; with the score tied at 2–2 and Orient seemingly destined to miss out yet again, news came through of a late goal scored against promotion rivals Grimsby Town that would potentially promote Orient. The Orient fans were still celebrating this when just 14 seconds later, Lee Steele scored to confirm Orient's promotion. The result also relegated Oxford to the Football Conference. Grimsby's manager that season was Russell Slade, who would later become Orient's manager.

In 2006–07, Orient endured a difficult season in the third tier, having spent most of the season in or around the relegation zone and were bottom of the table at times during the first half of the season. An improvement in fortunes after Christmas – including memorable wins against Millwall, Tranmere Rovers and a vital win at eventually-relegated Bradford City near the end of the season – helped them finish in 20th place, one spot above the relegation zone. Most of the 2006 promotion-winning side left at the end of the season. Some players were released, some declined new contracts and the club's longest-serving player Matthew Lockwood was re-signed but later moved in pre-season to Nottingham Forest.

In 2007–08, Orient finished 14th with 60 points. The O's began the season in fine form, not dropping out of the top seven until after Christmas. However a loss of form in the second half of the season, recording only three wins from the last 12 games, meant the season ended in a mid-table finish.

Leyton Orient kicked off the 2008–09 season with a 2–1 win over Hereford United at home. Dean Beckwith put Hereford ahead before JJ Melligan and Adam Boyd gave Orient the win. Orient then continued the season with multiple poor results and performances throughout September and October and their only wins were away matches against Walsall and Southend United in the Football League Trophy first round. However Orient were knocked out of the trophy in the following round in an away match at Brighton & Hove Albion. Orient booked a place in the second round of the FA Cup after defeating Colchester United 1–0. This was followed by a 1–2 away victory against Bradford City to put Orient through to the third round of the FA Cup where they played Sheffield United at home. They lost 4–1 and, after a run of poor form in the league, Orient parted company with manager Martin Ling and assistant Dean Smith. Youth team manager Kevin Nugent was named caretaker manager overseeing three games. On 5 February 2009 Geraint Williams was announced as manager until the end of the season. He enjoyed a very positive start, winning seven of his first nine matches and moving Orient up to 15th. The club secured their League One status on 13 April with a 1–0 win over Swindon Town at the County Ground and eventually finished the season in 14th place.

Orient defeated Newcastle United 6–1 in a pre-season friendly match on 25 July 2009. By beating Colchester United away, in the first round of the Football League Cup, they earned a home second round fixture against Premier League Club, Stoke City.

=== Continued success (2010–2014) ===
On 3 April 2010 Geraint Williams was dismissed as manager after a 3–1 home defeat to fellow relegation strugglers Hartlepool following a poor run of form. Kevin Nugent once again took control for the 2–1 defeat at Southampton on 5 April and after the match Russell Slade was named as manager until the end of the season. With even less time to save Orient from relegation than Williams before him, Slade managed to bring about a change in form that saw Orient finish in 17th place, just one point but four places clear of relegation. In the summer of 2010 Slade's contract was extended for two years. After a poor start to the 2010–11 season, Orient's league form picked up towards Christmas, culminating in an 8–2 win against non-league Droylsden in an FA Cup second round replay. Orient had trailed most of the game 2–0 but scored six goals in extra time to progress into the third round. Orient then defeated Championship side Norwich City 1–0 at Carrow Road to progress into the fourth round where they met another Championship side, Swansea City, at the Liberty Stadium. Orient defeated Swansea 2–1 to set up a fifth round tie against Premier League club Arsenal at Brisbane Road, which finished in a 1–1 draw following a late Jonathan Téhoué equaliser for Orient. This set up a replay at the Emirates Stadium. Leyton Orient lost that replay 0–5, bringing to an end their longest run in the FA Cup since 1981–82. Either side of the Arsenal games, Leyton Orient achieved a club record-equalling 14 games unbeaten, putting the team just outside the play-off positions. However they were unable to maintain that momentum and ultimately missed out on the play-offs by just one point.

The 2013–14 season saw more success for Orient, finishing third in the league and securing a place in the play-offs. They defeated Peterborough United to advance to the playoff final at Wembley, but lost in the final to Rotherham United via a penalty shoot-out.

=== Sale, financial crisis and fall to Non-League (2014–2017) ===
The 2014–15 season saw a reversal of fortunes for Orient after the club was taken over by Italian businessman Francesco Becchetti. Long-standing manager Russell Slade left early in the season and was replaced by caretaker manager Kevin Nugent, followed in quick succession by Mauro Milanese and then Fabio Liverani before Christmas 2014. A disastrous second half of the season meant that Orient was relegated from League One after a 2–2 draw at Swindon Town on the final day. Liverani, with only eight wins in 27 matches, left the club by mutual consent on 13 May 2015.

Orient finished one place but six points away from a League Two play-off place in the 2015–16 season. However, the following season (2016–17) saw another disastrous slump, under five different managers, as well as off-pitch turmoil, including a winding-up hearing against Becchetti for unpaid taxes. Another managerial departure saw Daniel Webb resign from the club, with assistant manager Omer Riza taking over first-team duties until the end of the season. On 22 April 2017, Orient were relegated to the National League after a 3–0 loss to Crewe Alexandra, ending their 112-year stay in the Football League. Becchetti who had overseen two relegations in three years, saw continued criticism for his ownership, which resulted in a pitch invasion and protest against him on 29 April, resulting in the game being called off. On 22 June, the club was officially sold to Nigel Travis, the chairman of Dunkin' Brands.

=== Non-League and promotion back to League One (2017–) ===
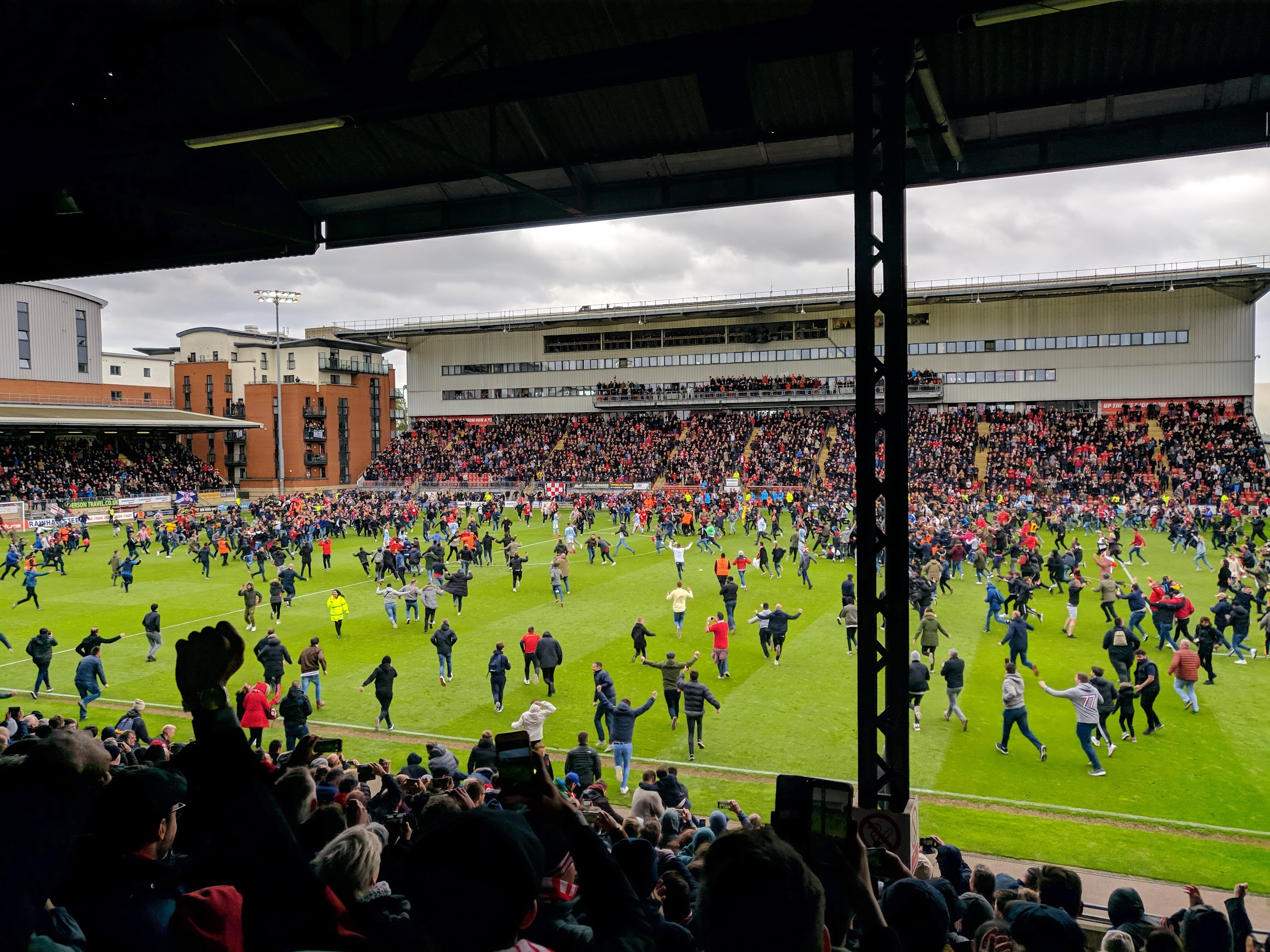
A pitch invasion at Brisbane Road as Leyton Orient win the National League, and thus promotion back to the Football League in 2019

After a poor start to the season, manager Steve Davis, appointed at the start of the National League campaign, was dismissed on 14 November 2017, and was replaced by Justin Edinburgh. Under Edinburgh the club fared better, and spent much of the 2018–19 season competing for promotion from the National League. On 27 April 2019, following a 0–0 draw with Braintree Town, Orient secured promotion to League Two as champions of the National League after two years in non-League. The club also reached the final of the FA Trophy, but were defeated by AFC Fylde.

On 3 June 2019, manager Justin Edinburgh was admitted to hospital following a cardiac arrest. He died five days later, aged 49. His assistant Ross Embleton was appointed as interim manager for the new season. Embleton was replaced by Carl Fletcher in October 2019 but Fletcher was dismissed the following month after just five games in charge without a win. Embleton was reinstated as interim manager. Embleton was appointed permanently in January 2020 on a 12-month rolling contract. Orient's first season back in League Two produced a 17th-place finish, with the final table ultimately being determined on a weighted points per game basis because of football's suspension due to the COVID-19 pandemic. During this time, the club furloughed all players and staff to reduce the financial burden on the club due to the pandemic. The following season, the club finished in 11th place in League Two. Embleton was dismissed in February 2021 and was replaced by Jobi McAnuff until the end of the season.

In May 2021 Kenny Jackett was named as the new manager. Jackett was dismissed in February 2022 after a poor run of form which left the club only 3 points above the League Two relegation zone, He was replaced by Richie Wellens who kept Orient up and secured a comfortable 13th-placed finish. A strong 2022–23 season saw the club promoted back to League One on 18 April 2023, after eight years away from the level, securing their promotion with four games remaining despite a 2–0 defeat to Gillingham. Orient took the League Two title four days later with a 2–0 home victory over Crewe Alexandra. In the 2023–24 season, Orient cemented their place in League One for a following season, finishing 11th. In the 2024–25 season Orient finished sixth and qualified for the playoffs. After beating Stockport on penalties in the semifinals, Orient lost the final 1–0 to Charlton.

On 25 April 2025, a US consortium, which is fronted by New York-based businessman David Gandler, has completed a 100 per cent takeover from Eagle Investments 2017 Limited, the club's previous owner, with Gandler owning 78.55% as the majority shareholder.

Following the completion of David Gandler’s acquisition of a majority stake in April 2025, Leyton Orient F.C. announced a six-point strategic development plan under the new ownership of GSG LOFC Limited. The plan includes the construction of a new stadium in Waltham Forest, investment in upgraded training facilities, expanded support for the club's women's team, the growth of its youth academy, enhanced engagement via the Leyton Orient Trust, and a commitment to sustainable progress toward promotion to the EFL Championship. Chairman Nigel Travis confirmed he would remain in his role during a transitional period, with key executives including CEO Mark Devlin continuing in their posts.

== Recent seasons ==
| Season | Division | Tier | Pos | Pl | W | D | L | + | - | P | Note |
|---|---|---|---|---|---|---|---|---|---|---|---|
| 2016–17 | League Two | IV | ↓ 24 | 46 | 10 | 6 | 30 | 47 | 87 | 36 | Relegated to National League |
| 2017–18 | National League | V | 13 | 46 | 16 | 12 | 18 | 58 | 56 | 60 | |
| 2018–19 | National League | V | ↑ 1 | 46 | 25 | 14 | 7 | 73 | 35 | 89 | Promoted to League Two |
| 2019–20 | League Two | IV | 17 | 36 | 10 | 12 | 14 | 47 | 55 | 42 | |
| 2020–21 | League Two | IV | 11 | 46 | 17 | 10 | 19 | 53 | 55 | 61 | |
| 2021–22 | League Two | IV | 13 | 46 | 14 | 16 | 16 | 62 | 47 | 58 | |
| 2022–23 | League Two | IV | ↑ 1 | 46 | 26 | 13 | 7 | 61 | 34 | 91 | Promoted to League One |
| 2023–24 | League One | III | 11 | 46 | 18 | 11 | 17 | 53 | 55 | 65 | |
| 2024–25 | League One | III | 6 | 46 | 24 | 6 | 16 | 72 | 48 | 78 | Lost the League One play-off final to Charlton Athletic |
| 2025–26 | League One | III | 20 | 46 | 14 | 10 | 22 | 59 | 71 | 52 | |

== Kit and badge ==
Orient's crest is made up of two wyverns facing each other over a football. The wyvern symbol was introduced in 1976 and is believed to incorporate Orient's links with the City of London – the wyvern is the symbol of the Thames, in mythology is the defender of the Thames – and with the sea, through the old Orient Shipping Company. The wyvern on the badge provided the inspiration for the club mascot Theo who got his name from a shortening of the club nickname, the O's. Theo first appeared in the 2000–01 season.

Previous club crests have included a version of the Borough of Leyton's coat of arms and a single red dragon. The club's home colours are all red.

=== Sponsorship ===
The club shirt sponsorship deals have included tie-ups with Independent Transport, Acclaim Entertainment, Marchpole, Matchroom Sport and PokerMillion.com. At the start of the 2008–09 season the club entered into a three-year deal with PartyGaming.com to present PartyPoker.com, PartyBets.com and PartyCasino.com on the front of players' and replica kits.

During the 2012–13 season, the shirt sponsors were Samsung and FIFA 13. The same sponsors were used for the 2013–14 season, only FIFA 13 became FIFA 14. For 2014–15, the club announced a deal with online bookmakers 666Bet.

On 30 July 2015, Orient announced a deal that would see steel distributors and stockholders Rainham Steel feature on the home, away and third kits. From 2016 to 2018, Orient were sponsored by Energybet.com. From 2018 to 2019 onwards, Orient's principal shirt sponsor was The Sun's Dream Team. For the 2020–21 season until the 2022–23 season, former loanee Harry Kane sponsored Orient, using the space on their shirts to thank the key workers of the Coronavirus pandemic, and support the Haven House Children's Hospice and Mind, the mental health charity. 10% from the sale of every shirt was allocated to the charity named on the front. In November 2020, the club announced a new sponsorship with the British YouTuber group the Sidemen, as the group were looking to support a local club and a stadium to record their popular football challenges. For the 2023–24 season, it was announced that investment bankers Eastdil Secured would be the main shirt sponsor.

== Stadiums ==
Orient's initial ground was at Glyn Road between 1884 and 1896 when the club moved to Whittle's Athletic Ground.

=== Millfields ===
Whittle's Athletic Ground was originally a whippet racing ground later known as Millfields and Clapton Orient played there until 1930. The O's also played pre-season friendlies at Leyton Cricket Ground for several seasons.

Millfields could hold 35,000 or more and was quite modern for its time, though larger crowds were typically for dog racing and speedway and was a major London venue for boxing and baseball. As Orient was only a tenant and facing high rents and competition with other events at Millfields Road, Orient owners left Millfields Road for another racing ground across Hackney Marshes soon after, having stayed for 30 years. The ground closed in 1969, the Greyhound Racing Association selling with housing redevelopment taking its place in 1974.

=== Lea Bridge Road ===
Clapton Orient left Millfields in 1930, moving to Lea Bridge Stadium which had been used as a speedway stadium. Orient's first match held there was a 3–1 win over Newport County on 4 September 1930, in front of a crowd of 5,505. However, the ground was closed for repairs by order of the Football League after the directors of Torquay United complained that a wooden fence was too close to the touchline. Orient's next two home league fixtures (both victories) were held at Wembley Stadium, the second attracting a crowd of just 1,916 to see the 3–1 win over Southend United. An FA Cup tie against Luton Town had to be held at Arsenal Stadium.

The capacity of the stadium was 20,000 and although with improvements it could have been increased to 50,000, the Orient directors were never content with the ground. There were rumours of a move as far as Mitcham or a merger with short-lived neighbours Thames but a decision was made to move to Brisbane Road in time for the start of the 1937–38 season. The last Orient match to be held at Lea Bridge Road was another 3–1 victory over Southend United in front of a crowd of 2,541. The stadium was demolished in the 1970s.

=== Brisbane Road ===
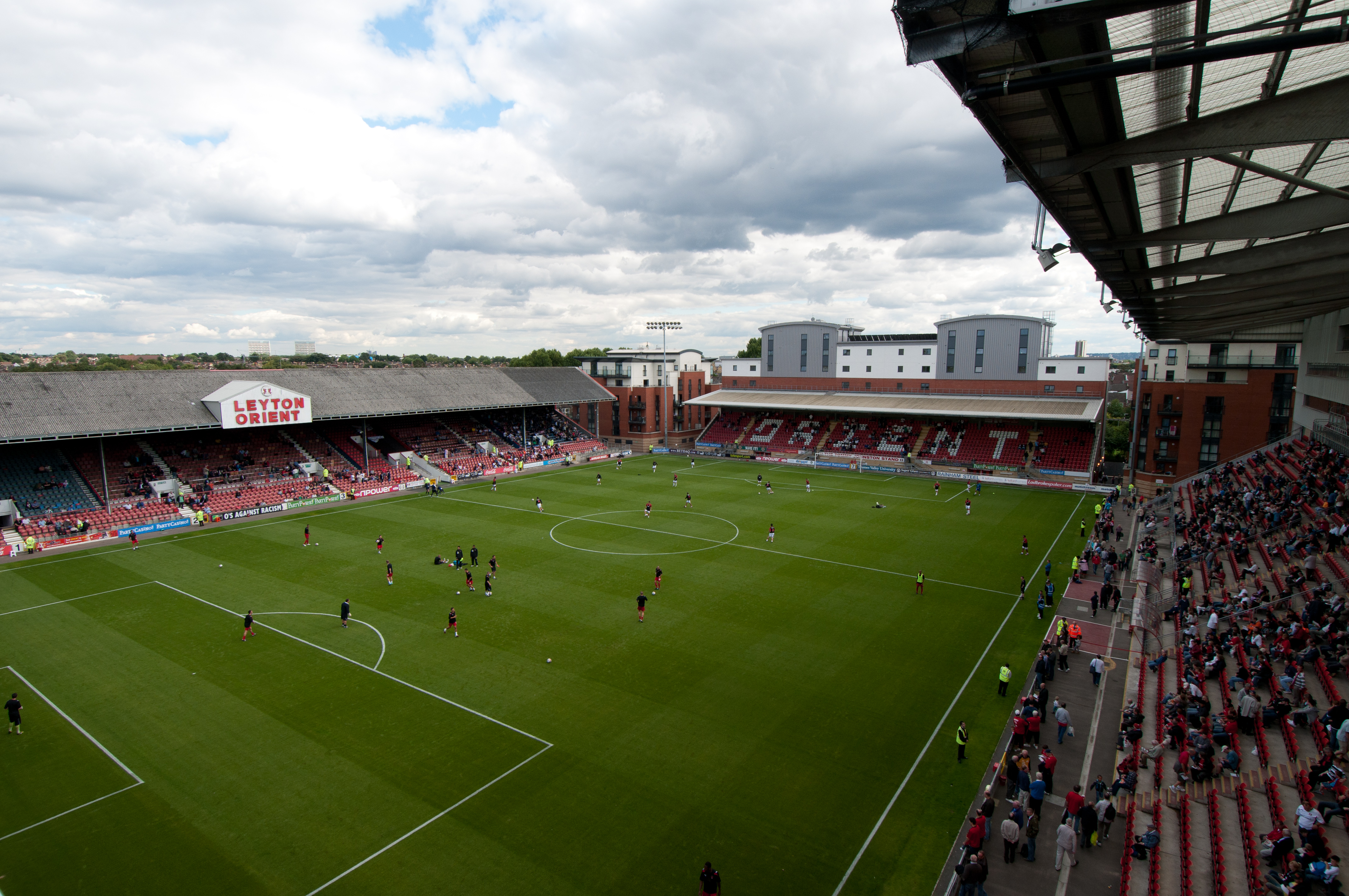
Brisbane Road

Brisbane Road has undergone many changes since Orient's arrival. Previously known as Osborne Road and having been the home of Leyton F.C., it initially had only one stand (known as "the orange box") on the east side that held 475 people and cover on the west side for standing. All of the standing was cinder banks. The East Stand (also known as the Main Stand) was bought from Mitcham Greyhound Stadium in 1956 and eventually extended to cover the whole east side. The terraced enclosures at the front of the East Stand were replaced by seating in the late 1990s. Over the decades, the west side became a covered terrace and finally a seated-stand, while uncovered terracing was built at the north and south sides. As the ground's capacity was being progressively reduced through changes to ground safety regulations, Orient looked to redevelop Brisbane Road as an all-seater stadium to secure its future there.

The initial plans, dubbed Orient 2000 by the club, were revealed in the mid-1990s. The plans were ambitious, as they involved rotating the pitch and developing all four sides. However, the club's near-bankruptcy and subsequent buy-out by Barry Hearn meant that a more realistic redevelopment plan was instigated. The first phase involved demolition of the South Terrace in the late 1990s and after delays while National Lottery funding was unsuccessfully sought the new South Stand was opened at the start of the 1999–2000 season.

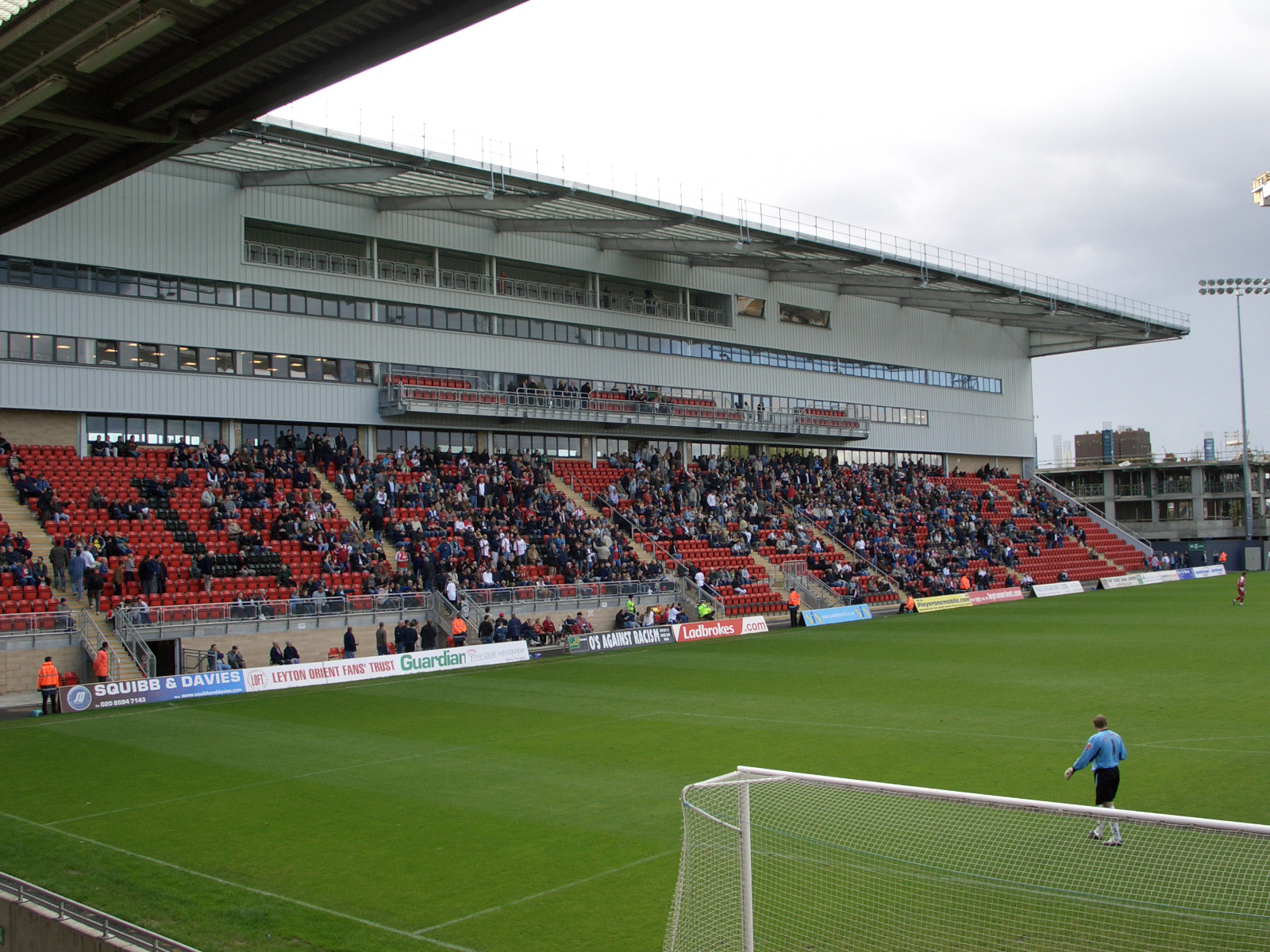
West Stand viewed from South Stand

The next phase of redevelopment (replacement of the North Terrace and West Stand) ran into financial problems. Notwithstanding that finance for the redevelopment had already been raised by selling off the four corners of the stadium for residential blocks of flats, an increase in costs meant that an emergency general meeting of the company was needed in April 2005. It was agreed that the club should sell a c.999-year lease on the West Stand for £1.5 million to a consortium led by Barry Hearn (under the company name Samuel Beadie (Leyton) Ltd or SBLL), with SBLL leasing back to the club on a same-length lease all of the stand except the office space for an annual rent of £1. The additional funds generated by this complicated arrangement were used to complete the building of the West Stand. External completion of the West Stand was achieved in mid-2005 and the stand was opened for the 2005–06 season. The stand has a single lower tier of seating, while further up the structure are directors' and corporate hospitality boxes, club offices and player facilities, which were fitted out in summer 2007, prior to which the players continued to use the facilities in the East Stand.

A second EGM was held in May 2006, where it was agreed to sell further land behind the North and South Stands to SBLL for £1.25 million, the proceeds to be used to fund the building of the North Stand. The plan was to commence building the North Stand in July 2006 and for it to be open by Christmas 2006 but Waltham Forest council initially rejected the revised planning application for the stand and its adjoining additional flats. A revised application approved in early 2007 and construction began towards the end of the 2006–07 season. The stand – which has become the Family Stand – was completed before the 2007–08 season, giving the O's a four-sided ground once more, with a capacity of 9,271. The modernisation of the East Stand happened during the break between the season of 2013–14 and 2015–16. Black seats formed a pattern over the other red seats to spell out "The O's".

During the 2008–09 season, Leyton Orient changed the name of the South Stand in honour of the late Orient top-scorer, Tommy Johnston and is known simply as the Tommy Johnston Stand.

On 25 January 2022, the club renamed the West Stand to the 'Justin Edinburgh Stand', honoring the legacy of the late manager in bringing Leyton Orient back into the Football League after their short stay in the National League.

=== Olympic Stadium proposal ===
On 18 October 2011, the club submitted a request to the Football League to become tenants of the London 2012 Olympic Stadium after the initial decision to award West Ham the stadium collapsed on 11 October 2011, following legal challenges from Tottenham Hotspur and Leyton Orient. Orient also expressed an interest in ground sharing the stadium with West Ham, but West Ham were not keen on the idea, and in December 2012 West Ham was chosen as the permanent tenant of the Olympic Stadium.

Orient chairman Barry Hearn voiced his complaints over West Ham United being given an anchor tenancy at the stadium. Orient said that the stadium was too close to their own, which they alleged would breach FA rules and by extension, move the club into bankruptcy. On 6 March, Barry Hearn stated that he would mount another legal challenge as he believed that the rules set out by the LLDC had not been followed. Hearn also said that he felt that Leyton Orient's proposed ground share had been ignored and not properly explored. Orient's legal challenge was ended when a confidential agreement between Orient and the Premier League was reached.

== Supporters ==
The supporter fan-base is usually centred in East London.

The Supporters club is the official supporters representative alongside Leyton Orient Fans Trust. The fans' trust coordinated protests against the owner at the time between 2017 and 2019 at Blackpool (along with home fans who were also protesting their management). In April 2016 a smaller unofficial fans group known at the time as the Orient Transit Firm arranged pitch protests against Hartlepool United, where the fans stormed the pitch and Colchester United where the game was abandoned after a pitch invasion with five minutes remaining which saw thousands enter the pitch effectively getting the game abandoned. The remaining five minutes of the game were eventually played three hours later behind closed doors, the protest brought much needed publicity to the club's plight, with worldwide news coverage.

Notable fans include Bob Mills, Daniel Mays, Colin Matthews, Gary Stevenson, Andrew Lloyd Webber, and Andrew's brother Julian.

== Rivalries ==
Among Orient's main rivals are Southend United, with whom they contest the A13 derby. The rivalry came about after a period of Southend being Orient's geographically closest league rivals between 1998 and 2005. Although they have not often played in the same division, they met in the League Cup in 2011–12 season, with Leyton Orient defeating Southend after extra time on penalties. In the 2012–13 Football League Trophy Southern Area final, Southend defeated Orient 3–2 on aggregate.

Other local rivals include West Ham United, Millwall, Brentford, Dagenham & Redbridge, Colchester United and Barnet.

Historic rivals include neighbours Leyton and two other disbanded/merged clubs, Leytonstone and Walthamstow Avenue. The Dagenham & Redbridge rivalry continues the old rivalries with the latter two.

== Players ==
=== Current squad ===
As of 3 September 2026

Note: Flags indicate national team as defined under FIFA eligibility rules; some limited exceptions apply. Players may hold more than one non-FIFA nationality.

| No. | Pos. | Nation | Player |
|---|---|---|---|
| 1 | GK | ENG | Nathan Baxter |
| 2 | DF | WAL | Fin Stevens |
| 3 | DF | ENG | James Morris |
| 4 | DF | ENG | Rarmani Edmonds-Green |
| 5 | DF | NGR | Joseph Olowu |
| 6 | DF | ENG | Will Forrester |
| 7 | FW | IRL | Ollie O'Neill |
| 8 | MF | TUN | Idris El Mizouni (vice-captain) |
| 9 | FW | IRL | Jaze Kabia |
| 10 | FW | IRL | Aaron Connolly |
| 11 | MF | ENG | Demetri Mitchell |
| 12 | DF | ENG | Alfie Gilchrist (on loan from West Bromwich Albion) |
| 13 | GK | ENG | Noah Phillips |
| 14 | MF | JAM | Isaac Hayden (captain) |
| 15 | MF | MDA | Cristian Păscăluță |
| 17 | MF | ALB | Armando Dobra |

| No. | Pos. | Nation | Player |
|---|---|---|---|
| 18 | FW | ENG | Dane Scarlett |
| 19 | DF | ENG | Somto Boniface (on loan from Ipswich Town) |
| 20 | MF | IRL | Alex Gilbert |
| 22 | FW | MAR | Yusuf Akhamrich (on loan from Tottenham Hotspur) |
| 25 | MF | ENG | Charlie Wellens |
| 27 | FW | IRL | Tony Springett |
| 28 | DF | TCA | Sean Clare |
| 30 | MF | ENG | Alfie Wellens |
| 31 | DF | ENG | Zak O’Keefe |
| 32 | FW | ENG | Zac Hambury |
| 33 | GK | IRL | Killian Cahill |
| 34 | DF | ENG | Phil Chinedu |
| 42 | FW | ENG | Lemar Gordon |
| 43 | FW | ENG | Jakob Lowe |
| 44 | FW | SCO | Theo Archibald |
| 49 | FW | ENG | Nick Oyekunle (on loan from Southampton) |

=== Out on loan ===
Note: Flags indicate national team as defined under FIFA eligibility rules; some limited exceptions apply. Players may hold more than one non-FIFA nationality.

| No. | Pos. | Nation | Player |
|---|---|---|---|
| 29 | MF | KEN | Zech Obiero (on loan at Gillingham until the end of the 2026/27 season) |
| 35 | FW | OMA | Tariq Al-Sadi (on loan at Enfield Town until November 2026) |
| 40 | DF | SCO | Michael Craig (on loan at Harrogate Town until December 2026) |
| 41 | MF | ENG | Tyreeq Bakinson (on loan to Plymouth Argyle until the end of the 2026/27 season) |
| — | FW | SLE | Josh Koroma (on loan to Chesterfield until the end of the 2026/27 season) |

== Club management ==
=== Boardroom staff ===
| Position | Name |
|---|---|
| Chairman | Nigel Travis |
| Vice Chairman | Kent Teague |
| Directors | David Gandler; Nigel Travis; Kent Teague; Rich Emmett; Matt Porter |
| Chief Executive Officer | Mark Devlin |

=== Coaching positions ===
| Position | Name |
|---|---|
| Director of football | Scott Mitchell |
| Head coach | Richie Wellens |
| Assistant head coach | Paul Terry |
| First team coach | Darren Pratley |
| Goalkeeping coach | Simon Royce |
| First team performance analyst | Charlie George |
| Physical performance coach | Jack Manuel |
| Head physiotherapist | Ketan Patel |
| Sports therapist | Melvin Hancock |
| Sports scientist | Jack Manuel |
| Academy manager | Mel Jeffries |
| U18 head coach | Mark Timmington |
| Club doctors | Carl Waldmann |
| Kit manager | Adrian Martin |
| Chief scout | Steve Foster |

== Club records ==
- Best FA Cup performance: Semi-finals, 1977–78
- Best League Cup performance: Fifth round, 1962–63
- Best League Trophy performance: Southern Area finalists, 1994–95, 2012–13
- Biggest victory: 8–0 vs. Crystal Palace, Division 3 South 12 November 1955; 8–0 vs. Rochdale, Division 4 14 October 1987; 8–0 vs. Colchester United, Division 4 15 October 1988; 8–0 vs. Doncaster Rovers, Division 3 28 December 1997
- Most goals scored in a match: 9–2 vs. Aldershot, Division 3 South 10 February 1934; 9–2 vs. Chester City, League Cup 17 October 1962
- Biggest defeat: 0–8 vs. Aston Villa, FA Cup 4th round 30 January 1929
- Biggest league defeat: 1–7 vs. Torquay United, Division 3 South 16 April 1949; 1–7 vs. Notts County, Division 3 South 1 October 1949; 1–7 vs. Stoke City, Division 2 22 September 1956
- Highest attendance: 38,219 vs. Tottenham Hotspur Division 2 16 March 1929
- Most capped international player: 22 – Jobi McAnuff (Jamaica) (32 in total)
- Most league goals in a season: 35 – Tommy Johnston 1957–58, Division 2
- Most league goals in total: 121 – Tommy Johnston, 1956–58, 1959–61
- Highest transfer fee received: £5,000,000 – Dom Ballard to Bristol City, August 2026
- Highest transfer fee paid: £600,000 – Jaze Kabia from Grimsby Town, August 2026
- The fastest recorded goal in a play-off final: Chris Tate, May 2001 vs. Blackpool – 27 seconds
- Fastest goal scored for the club: Lee Steele, 28 March 2005 vs. Oxford United - 12 seconds

== Honours ==
League

- Second Division (level 2)
  - Runners-up: 1961–62
- Third Division South / Third Division (level 3)
  - Champions: 1955–56, 1969–70
- Fourth Division / League Two (level 4)
  - Champions: 2022–23
  - Promoted: 2005–06
  - Play-off winners: 1989
- National League (level 5)
  - Champions: 2018–19

Cup

- FA Trophy
  - Runners-up: 2018–19
- Anglo-Scottish Cup
  - Runners-up: 1976–77
- London Challenge Cup
  - Winners: 1912, 1972, 1973, 1993
- Dubonnet Cup
  - Winners: 1911
