= Nathan Baxter (footballer) =

English footballer (born 1998)

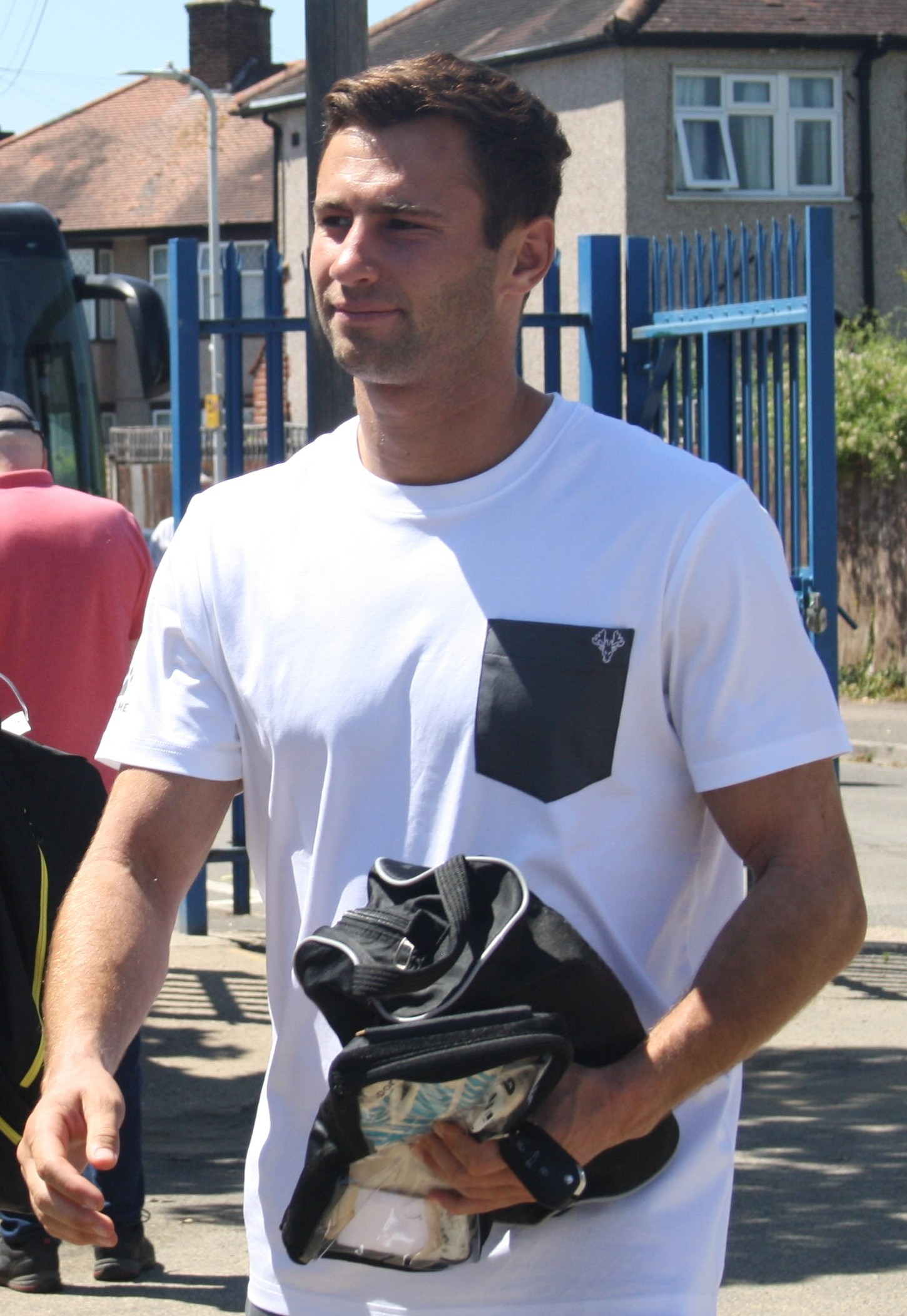
- Baxter with Watford in 2025.

Personal information
- Full name: Nathan Joseph Baxter
- Date of birth: 8 November 1998 (age 28)
- Place of birth: Westminster, England
- Height: 6 ft 3 in (1.91 m)
- Position: Goalkeeper

Team information
- Current team: Leyton Orient
- Number: 1

Youth career
- Cray Wanderers
- 2006–2016: Chelsea

Senior career*
Years	Team	Apps	(Gls)
2016–2023	Chelsea	0	(0)
2016–2017	→ Metropolitan Police (loan)	14	(0)
2017	→ Solihull Moors (loan)	17	(0)
2017–2018	→ Woking (loan)	42	(0)
2018–2019	→ Yeovil Town (loan)	34	(0)
2019–2020	→ Ross County (loan)	13	(0)
2020–2021	→ Accrington Stanley (loan)	16	(0)
2021–2022	→ Hull City (loan)	16	(0)
2022–2023	→ Hull City (loan)	12	(0)
2023–2025	Bolton Wanderers	59	(0)
2025–2026	Watford	7	(0)
2026–	Leyton Orient	12	(0)
- * Club domestic league appearances and goals as of 12:04, 22 November 2026 (UTC)

Nathan Joseph Baxter (born 8 November 1998) is an English professional footballer who plays as a goalkeeper for Leyton Orient.

== Club career ==
=== Chelsea ===
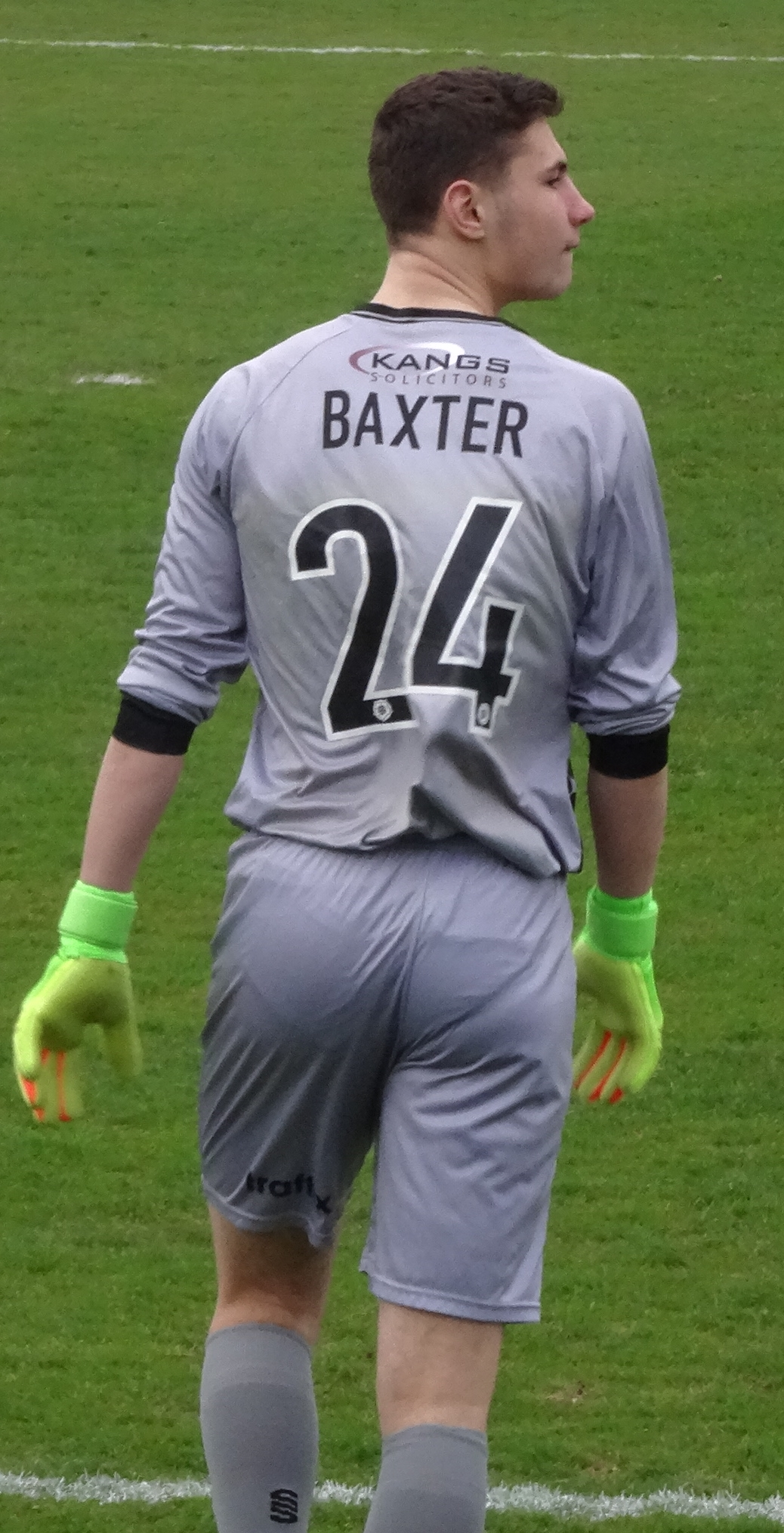
Baxter playing for Solihull Moors in 2017.

Born in Westminster, Baxter began his career with Cray Wanderers. He then joined Chelsea at the age of 8. In the 2015–16 season he won the FA Youth Cup and the UEFA Youth League.

In August 2016 he moved on loan to Isthmian League side Metropolitan Police on a short-term deal until January 2017. He spent four months at the club, making 19 appearances, before returning to Chelsea in January 2017.

He then joined National League side Solihull Moors on loan for the remainder of the 2016–17 campaign. On 21 January 2017, he made his Solihull debut, keeping a clean sheet during their 0–0 draw with Boreham Wood. He made three clean sheets in his first four games for the club. Baxter went on to make 17 appearances in total for the club.

On 21 June 2017, Baxter joined fellow National League side Woking on a season-long loan. On the opening day of the campaign, Baxter went on to make his Woking debut as they recorded a 2–1 home victory over Gateshead. Baxter went on to make 48 appearances in total for the club. During the 2017–18 season, Baxter played more minutes (4320) than any other Chelsea loanee.

On 26 June 2018, Baxter agreed to join League Two side Yeovil Town on a season-long loan. Baxter made his Football League debut in their opening day of the season, in a 1–0 away defeat against Bury. At Yeovil, he did not concede a goal for 10 hours 12 minutes, and set a club record after keeping 6 consecutive clean sheets in all competitions.

As of 5 November 2018, he was the "only teenage goalkeeper currently in English football's professional ranks to have racked up over 100 appearances in the senior game".

Baxter made 38 appearances for Yeovil during his season with the club, and won 5 awards at the club's end of season awards, all in the 'Player of the Season' and 'Young Player of the Season' categories.

On 19 June 2019, Baxter joined Scottish Premiership side Ross County on a season long loan. He suffered a shoulder injury early in the season before returning to first-team action, and went on to play in 14 games in a row.

On 9 October 2020, Baxter joined Accrington Stanley on loan.

On 25 June 2021, he moved on loan to Hull City for the season. Baxter made his league debut on 6 November 2021, in a 2–0 victory over Barnsley at Oakwell and was later selected in the Championship's team of the week following an impressing showing on his first league start. He went on to make 18 appearances for the club, including 7 clean sheets in his 16 league matches and having the highest save percentage in the Championship at 79.5 percent.

On 4 July 2022, Baxter returned to Hull City for a second season-long loan spell.

=== Bolton Wanderers ===
On 16 June 2023, Chelsea announced that Baxter would leave the club when his contract expired at the end of June. On 19 June 2023, Bolton Wanderers announced the signing of Baxter on a two-year contract from 1 July, being his first permanent move after seven years of loan spells. It was reported that he turned down a move to Maccabi Haifa, preferring to sign for Bolton. On 7 May 2025, the club confirmed that Baxter would leave at the end of his contract.

=== Watford ===
On 2 June 2025, Baxter agreed to join Championship side Watford on a two-year contract upon the expiration of his contract with Bolton Wanderers.

=== Leyton Orient ===
In July 2026 he signed for Leyton Orient.

== Personal life ==
Baxter was born in London to parents of Jewish descent and has stated that Petr Čech was his inspiration. In December 2025, Baxter spoke about his Jewish identity publicly for the first time, when he was a guest speaker at one of the longest-running Hanukkah events in English football, hosted by Watford FC and the Jewish Hornets supporters' group.

== Career statistics ==
As of mach played 21 November 2026

Appearances and goals by club, season and competition
Club	Season	League			National Cup (Note: Includes FA Cup and Scottish Cup)		League Cup (Note: Includes EFL Cup and Scottish League Cup)		Other		Total	
Club	Season	Division	Apps	Goals	Apps	Goals	Apps	Goals	Apps	Goals	Apps	Goals
Chelsea	2016–17	Premier League	0	0	0	0	0	0	0	0	0	0
Chelsea	2017–18	Premier League	0	0	0	0	0	0	0	0	0	0
Chelsea	2018–19	Premier League	0	0	0	0	0	0	0	0	0	0
Chelsea	2019–20	Premier League	0	0	0	0	0	0	0	0	0	0
Chelsea	2020–21	Premier League	0	0	0	0	0	0	0	0	0	0
Chelsea	2021–22	Premier League	0	0	0	0	0	0	0	0	0	0
Chelsea	2022–23	Premier League	0	0	0	0	0	0	0	0	0	0
Chelsea	Total		0	0	0	0	0	0	0	0	0	0
Metropolitan Police (loan)	2016–17	Isthmian League	14	0	2	0	—		3 (Note: Two appearances in Alan Turvey Trophy, one in FA Trophy)	0	19	0
Solihull Moors (loan)	2016–17	National League	17	0	—		—		—		17	0
Woking (loan)	2017–18	National League	42	0	6	0	—		0	0	48	0
Yeovil Town (loan)	2018–19	League Two	34	0	1	0	1	0	2 (Note: Appearance(s) in EFL Trophy)	0	38	0
Ross County (loan)	2019–20	Scottish Premiership	13	0	1	0	0	0	—		14	0
Accrington Stanley (loan)	2020–21	League One	16	0	1	0	0	0	2	0	19	0
Hull City (loan)	2021–22	Championship	16	0	1	0	1	0	0	0	18	0
Hull City (loan)	2022–23	Championship	12	0	0	0	0	0	0	0	12	0
Bolton Wanderers	2023–24	League One	33	0	4	0	1	0	5 (Note: Two appearances in EFL Trophy, three appearances in League One play-offs)	0	43	0
Bolton Wanderers	2024–25	League One	26	0	0	0	0	0	3	0	29	0
Bolton Wanderers	Total		59	0	4	0	1	0	8	0	72	0
Watford	2025–26	Championship	7	0	1	0	0	0	0	0	8	0
Leyton Orient	2026–27	League One	12	0	1	0	1	0	0	0	14	0
Career total			242	0	18	0	4	0	15	0	279	0

== Honours ==
Chelsea Youth

- FA Youth Cup: 2015–16
- UEFA Youth League: 2015–16

Individual

- Yeovil Town Player of the Season: 2018–19
- Yeovil Town Young Player of the Season: 2018–19
