= Zech Obiero =

Kenyan footballer

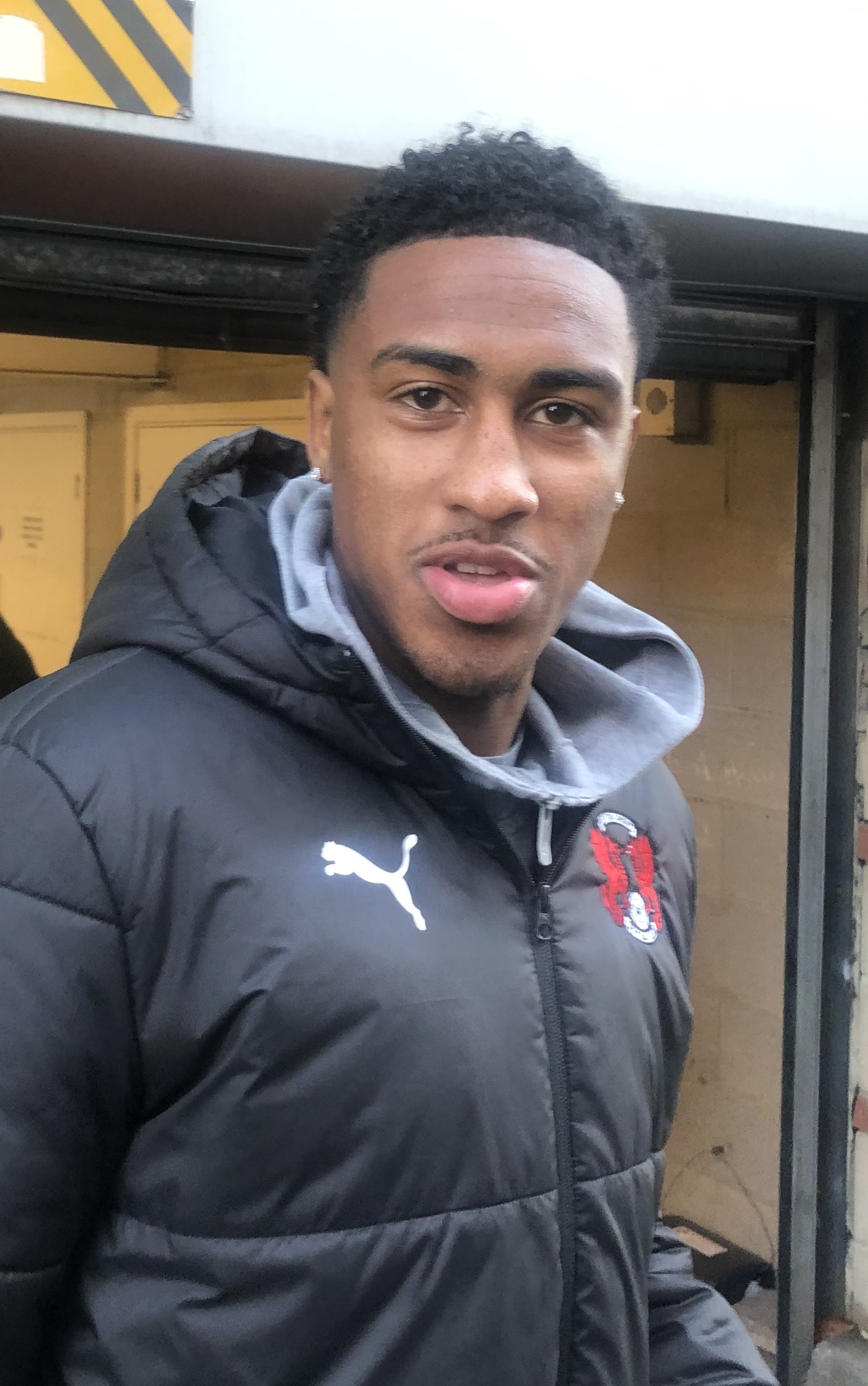
- Zech Obiero in 2024.

Personal information
- Full name: Zechariah Nahum Obiero
- Date of birth: 18 January 2005 (age 21)
- Place of birth: Redbridge, England
- Position: Midfielder

Team information
- Current team: Gillingham (on loan from Leyton Orient)
- Number: 35

Youth career
- 2012–2019: Tottenham Hotspur
- 2019–2021: Leyton Orient

Senior career*
| Years | Team | Apps | (Gls) |
| 2022– | Leyton Orient | 22 | (0) |
| 2023 | → Cheshunt (loan) | 15 | (2) |
| 2023 | → Chelmsford City (loan) | 7 | (0) |
| 2026 | → Tranmere Rovers (loan) | 13 | (2) |
| 2026– | → Gillingham (loan) | 1 | (0) |

International career^{‡}
| 2025– | Kenya U20 | 1 | (0) |
| 2026– | Kenya | 2 | (1) |
- * Club domestic league appearances and goals as of 05:00, 17 April 2026 (UTC) ‡ National team caps and goals as of 20:52, 5 September 2026 (UTC)

Zechariah Nahum Obiero (born 18 January 2005) is a professional footballer who plays as a midfielder for EFL League Two club Gillingham, on loan from Leyton Orient. Born in England, he represents the Kenya national team.

== Career ==
Obiero is a youth product of Tottenham Hotspur's youth academy, and joined Leyton Orient's academy at the age of 14. He signed a two-and-a-half-year professional contract with Orient in February 2022. He had appeared as an unused substitute in the EFL Cup tie with Queens Park Rangers on 11 August 2021.

He made his senior debut for Orient in the League Two match at Crawley Town on 30 April 2022, which Orient won 2–0.

In February 2023, Obiero signed for National League South club Cheshunt on loan. On 20 October 2023, Obiero signed for Chelmsford City on loan. On 18 November 2023, Obiero was recalled from his loan at Chelmsford.

== Personal life ==
Obiero is the son of the Kenyan former footballer Henry Obiero. His brother, Micah, is also a professional footballer.

== Statistics ==
As of match played 30 April 2022

Appearances and goals by club, season and competition
| Club | Season | League | | | FA Cup | | EFL Cup | | Other | | Total | |
| Club | Season | Division | Apps | Goals | Apps | Goals | Apps | Goals | Apps | Goals | Apps | Goals |
|---|---|---|---|---|---|---|---|---|---|---|---|---|
| Leyton Orient | 2021–22 | League Two | 1 | 0 | 0 | 0 | 0 | 0 | 0 | 0 | 1 | 0 |
| Cheshunt (loan) | 2022–23 | National League South | 15 | 2 | 0 | 0 | 0 | 0 | 1 (Note: Appearance(s) in Herts Senior Cup) | 0 | 16 | 2 |
| Career total | | | 16 | 2 | 0 | 0 | 0 | 0 | 1 | 0 | 17 | 2 |

=== International ===
As of match played 30 March 2026

Appearances and goals by national team and year
| National team | Year | Apps | Goals |
|---|---|---|---|
Kenya
| Kenya | 2026 | 2 | 1 |
| Total | | 2 | 1 |

As of match played 30 March 2026
Kenya score listed first, score column indicates score after each Obiero goal.

List of international goals scored by Zach Obiero
| No. | Date | Venue | Cap | Opponent | Score | Result | Competition |
|---|---|---|---|---|---|---|---|
| 1 | 30 March 2026 | Amahoro Stadium, Kigali, Rwanda | 2 | Grenada | 3–0 | 3–0 | 2026 FIFA Series |
