= 2023–24 Leyton Orient F.C. season =

125th season in existence of Leyton Orient FC

Leyton Orient
2023–24 season
- Chairman: Nigel Travis
- Head Coach: Richie Wellens
- Stadium: Brisbane Road
- League One: 11th
- FA Cup: Second round
- EFL Cup: First round
- EFL Trophy: Group stage
- Top goalscorer: Ruel Sotiriou (12)
- Average home league attendance: 8,162
Home colours	Away colours	Third colours

The 2023–24 season is the 125th season in the history of Leyton Orient and their first season back in League One since the 2014–15 season following their promotion from League Two in the previous season. The club are participating in League One, the FA Cup, the EFL Cup, and the 2023–24 EFL Trophy.

== Current squad ==
As of 22 March 2024

No.	Name	Position	Nationality	Place of birth	Date of birth (age)	Previous club	Date signed	Fee	Contract end
Goalkeepers
1	Sol Brynn	GK	(England)	Middlesbrough	30 October 2000 (age 26)	Middlesbrough	10 July 2023	Loan	31 May 2024
13	Sam Howes	GK	(England)	London	10 November 1997 (age 29)	Wealdstone	6 July 2023	Undisclosed	30 June 2025
Defenders
2	Tom James	RB	(Wales)	Cardiff	15 April 1996 (age 30)	(Scotland) Hibernian	19 July 2021	Free	30 June 2024
3	Jayden Sweeney	LB	(England)	Camden	4 December 2001 (age 24)	Academy	1 July 2019	Trainee	30 June 2025
5	Dan Happe	CB	(England)	Tower Hamlets	28 September 1998 (age 28)	Academy	2 October 2017	Trainee	30 June 2024
12	Brandon Cooper	CB	(Wales)	Porthcawl	14 January 2000 (age 26)	(Wales) Swansea City	16 January 2024	Undisclosed	30 June 2026
19	Omar Beckles	CB	(Grenada)	(England) Leytonstone	25 October 1991 (age 35)	Crewe Alexandra	1 July 2021	Free	30 June 2025
32	Rob Hunt	RB	(England)	Dagenham	7 July 1995 (age 31)	Swindon Town	27 July 2022	Free	30 June 2024
—N/a	Jack Simpson	CB	(England)	Weymouth	18 December 1996 (age 29)	(Wales) Cardiff City	29 February 2024	Free	30 June 2024
Midfielders
8	Jordan Brown	DM	(England)	Stoke-on-Trent	21 June 2001 (age 25)	Derby County	24 January 2022	Free	30 June 2025
11	Theo Archibald	LM	(Scotland)	Glasgow	5 March 1998 (age 28)	Lincoln City	1 July 2022	Undisclosed	30 June 2024
14	George Moncur	CM	(England)	Swindon	18 August 1993 (age 33)	Hull City	1 July 2022	Undisclosed	30 June 2025
15	Idris El Mizouni	CM	(Tunisia)	(France) Paris	26 September 2000 (age 26)	Ipswich Town	5 July 2023	Loan	31 May 2024
18	Darren Pratley	CM	(England)	Barking	22 April 1985 (age 41)	Charlton Athletic	1 July 2021	Free	30 June 2024
22	Ethan Galbraith	CM	(Northern Ireland)	Glengormley	11 May 2001 (age 25)	Manchester United	1 July 2023	Free	30 June 2025
23	Max Sanders	CM	(England)	Horsham	4 January 1999 (age 27)	Lincoln City	1 July 2023	Free	30 June 2025
29	Zech Obiero	CM	(Kenya)	(England) Redbridge	18 January 2005 (age 21)	Tottenham Hotspur	1 July 2019	Free	30 June 2024
30	Jephte Tanga	CM	(England)	Lambeth	16 June 2004 (age 22)	Academy	1 September 2022	Trainee	30 June 2024
34	Charlie Pegrum	RM	(England)	Havering	11 October 2004 (age 22)	Academy	8 August 2023	Trainee	30 June 2026
36	Makai Welch	CM	(England)			Academy	6 November 2023	Trainee	30 June 2024
38	Abdi Mohamud	CM	(England)			Academy	6 November 2023	Trainee	30 June 2024
Forwards
7	Dan Agyei	CF	(England)	Kingston upon Thames	1 June 1997 (age 29)	Crewe Alexandra	1 July 2023	Undisclosed	30 June 2025
9	Joe Pigott	CF	(England)	Maidstone	24 November 1993 (age 32)	Ipswich Town	21 July 2023	Free	30 June 2025
10	Ruel Sotiriou	LW	(Cyprus)	(England) Edmonton	24 August 2000 (age 26)	Academy	1 July 2018	Trainee	30 June 2024
17	Shaq Forde	CF	(England)	Watford	5 May 2004 (age 22)	Watford	14 August 2023	Loan	31 May 2024
20	Daniel Adu-Adjei	CF	(England)	London	21 June 2005 (age 21)	Bournemouth	1 February 2024	Loan	31 May 2024
21	Ollie O'Neill	LW	(Republic of Ireland)	(England) London	8 January 2003 (age 23)	Fulham	23 January 2024	Undisclosed	30 June 2026
24	Jordan Graham	RW	(England)	Coventry	5 March 1995 (age 31)	Birmingham City	2 August 2023	Free	30 June 2025
47	Khayon Edwards	CF	(England)	Islington	12 September 2003 (age 23)	Arsenal	1 February 2024	Loan	31 May 2024
Out on Loan
6	Adam Thompson	CB	(Northern Ireland)	(England) Harlow	28 September 1992 (age 34)	Rotherham United	30 January 2021	Undisclosed	30 June 2024
25	Harrison Sodje	LB	(England)	Lambeth	31 December 2003 (age 22)	Academy	8 August 2023	Trainee	30 June 2024
27	Rhys Byrne	GK	(England)	Redbridge	24 August 2002 (age 24)	Academy	1 July 2021	Trainee	30 June 2024

== Transfers ==
=== In ===
Date	Pos	Player	Transferred from	Fee	Ref
1 July 2023	CM	Max Sanders (ENG)	Lincoln City (ENG)	Free transfer	
1 July 2023	CF	Dan Agyei (ENG)	Crewe Alexandra (ENG)	Free transfer	
1 July 2023	CM	Ethan Galbraith (NIR)	Manchester United (ENG)	Free transfer	
6 July 2023	GK	Sam Howes (ENG)	Wealdstone (ENG)	Undisclosed	
21 July 2023	CF	Joe Pigott (ENG)	Ipswich Town (ENG)	Free transfer	
2 August 2023	RW	Jordan Graham (ENG)	Birmingham City (ENG)	Free transfer	
16 January 2024	CB	Brandon Cooper (WAL)	Swansea City (WAL)	Undisclosed	
23 January 2024	LW	Ollie O'Neill (IRL)	Fulham (ENG)	Undisclosed	
29 February 2024	CB	Jack Simpson (ENG)	Free agent	—N/a	

=== Loaned in ===
Date	Pos	Player	Loaned from	Date until	Ref
5 July 2023	CM	Idris El Mizouni (TUN)	Ipswich Town (ENG)	End of season	
10 July 2023	GK	Sol Brynn (ENG)	Middlesbrough (ENG)	End of season	
1 August 2023	CB	Ed Turns (WAL)	Brighton & Hove Albion (ENG)	1 February 2024 (Note: On 1 February, Turns was recalled back early to Brighton.)	
14 August 2023	CF	Shaq Forde (ENG)	Watford (ENG)	End of season	
1 September 2023	CB	Brandon Cooper (WAL)	Swansea City (WAL)	1 January 2024	
1 February 2024	CF	Daniel Adu-Adjei (ENG)	Bournemouth (ENG)	End of season	
1 February 2024	CF	Khayon Edwards (ENG)	Arsenal (ENG)	End of season	

=== Out ===
Date	Pos	Player	Transferred to	Fee	Ref
15 June 2023	CF	Daniel Nkrumah (ENG)	Middlesbrough (ENG)	Undisclosed	
30 June 2023	GK	Lawrence Vigouroux (CHI)	Burnley (ENG)	End of Contract	
30 June 2023	CM	Craig Clay (ENG)	Sutton United (ENG)	Released	
30 June 2023	CF	Sonny Fish (WAL)	Crawley Town (ENG)	Released	
30 June 2023	LW	Anthony Georgiou (CYP)	Enosis Neon Paralimni (CYP)	Released	
30 June 2023	DM	Jordan Lyden (AUS)	Hereford (ENG)	Released	
30 June 2023	GK	Sam Sargeant (ENG)	Waterford (IRL)	Released	
30 June 2023	CF	Harry Smith (ENG)	Sutton United (ENG)	Released	
30 June 2023	LB	Connor Wood (ENG)	Tranmere Rovers (ENG)	Released	
30 June 2023	CM	Matt Young (ENG)	Free agent	Released	
30 June 2023	RW	Paul Smyth (NIR)	Queens Park Rangers (ENG)	End of Contract	
19 July 2023	LB	Shadrach Ogie (IRL)	Gillingham (ENG)	Undisclosed	
1 February 2024	CF	Aaron Drinan (IRL)	Swindon Town (ENG)	Undisclosed	

=== Loaned out ===
Date	Pos	Player	Loaned to	Until	Ref
4 August 2023	CM	Jephte Tanga (ENG)	Welling United (ENG)	5 January 2024 (Note: On 5 January, Tanga was recalled back from his loan at Welling and subsequently joined Maidstone on loan.)	
2 October 2023	CM	Sahid Nallo (ENG)	Erith and Belvedere (ENG)	30 October 2023	
2 October 2023	CM	Charlie Pegrum (ENG)	Tonbridge Angels (ENG)	27 November 2023	
2 October 2023	CB	Marley St Louis (ENG)	Erith and Belvedere (ENG)	30 October 2023	
7 October 2023	LB	Harrison Sodje (ENG)	Bishop's Stortford (ENG)	30 November 2023	
20 October 2023	CM	Zech Obiero (KEN)	Chelmsford City (ENG)	20 November 2023	
6 November 2023	RB	Emmanuel Kwatchey (ENG)	Cray Wanderers (ENG)	4 December 2023	
11 November 2023	GK	Noah Phillips (ENG)	Hornchurch (ENG)	9 December 2023	
5 January 2024	CM	Jephte Tanga (ENG)	Maidstone United (ENG)	3 February 2024	
31 January 2024	CB	Adam Thompson (NIR)	Barnet (ENG)	End of season	
22 March 2024	GK	Rhys Byrne (ENG)	Dartford (ENG)	End of season	
22 March 2024	LB	Harrison Sodje (ENG)	Dartford (ENG)	End of season	

== Pre-season and friendlies ==
On 17 May, Orient announced their first pre-season friendly against Charlton Athletic in Málaga during a warm-weather training camp in Spain. A week later, two further friendlies were confirmed against Bishop's Stortford and Ebbsfleet United. Three more matches, against Billericay Town, Chelmsford City and Dagenham & Redbridge, and one still to be confirmed was later announced.

Win Draw Loss Fixtures

7 July 2023 Friendly	Billericay Town	0–0	Leyton Orient	Billericay
19:45 BST		Report		Stadium: New Lodge; Attendance: 1,642; Referee: Aaron Farmer

14 July 2023 Friendly	Charlton Athletic	1–1	Leyton Orient	Málaga, Spain
11:00 CEST; 10:00 BST	May 32'		Drinan 58'	Stadium: Marbella Football Centre

19 July 2023 Friendly	Chelmsford City	2–0	Leyton Orient	Chelmsford
19:45 BST	Jones 44'; Bettamer 85'			Stadium: Melbourne Stadium

19 July 2023 Friendly	Ebbsfleet United	3–2	Leyton Orient	Northfleet
19:45 BST	Poleon 12', 36'; Coulthirst 26'		Sotiriou 83'; Tanga 90'	Stadium: Stonebridge Road

25 July 2023 Friendly	Dagenham & Redbridge	1–1	Leyton Orient	Dagenham
19:45 BST	Ibie 24'		Moncur 48'	Stadium: Chigwell Construction Stadium

1 August 2023 Friendly	Bishop's Stortford	1–0	Leyton Orient	Bishop's Stortford
15:00 BST	Foxley 54' (pen.)	Report		Stadium: Woodside Park

== Competitions ==
=== Overall record ===
Competition	Starting round	Final position	Record							
Competition	Starting round	Final position	Pld	W	D	L	GF	GA	GD	Win %
League One	Matchday 1	11th	46	18	11	17	53	55	−2	39.13
FA Cup	First round	Second round	2	1	0	1	3	2	+1	50.00
EFL Cup	First round	First round	1	0	0	1	0	2	−2	0.00
EFL Trophy	Group stage	Group stage	3	0	1	2	4	6	−2	0.00
Total			52	19	12	21	60	65	−5	36.54

Last updated: 20 April 2024
Source: Soccerway

=== League One ===
==== League table ====
Pos	Team	Pld	W	D	L	GF	GA	GD	Pts
8	Blackpool	46	21	10	15	65	48	+17	73
9	Stevenage	46	19	14	13	57	46	+11	71
10	Wycombe Wanderers	46	17	14	15	60	55	+5	65
11	Leyton Orient	46	18	11	17	53	55	−2	65
12	Wigan Athletic	46	20	10	16	63	56	+7	62 (Note: On 19 May 2023, Wigan Athletic were deducted four points for failing to pay players and staff on time following previous EFL rules breaches in the 2022–23 season. Another four-point deduction was applied on 26 May, after the club's owners missed a deadline to deposit an amount equalling 125% of its monthly wage bill.)
13	Exeter City	46	17	10	19	46	61	−15	61
14	Northampton Town	46	17	9	20	57	66	−9	60

Source: EFL Official Website
Rules for classification: 1) Points; 2) Goal difference; 3) Number of goals scored; 4) Head-to-head results; 5) Wins; 6) Away goals; 7) Penalty points (sec 9.5); 8) 12-point sending off offences

==== Results summary ====
Overall								Home						Away					
Pld	W	D	L	GF	GA	GD	Pts	W	D	L	GF	GA	GD	W	D	L	GF	GA	GD
46	18	11	17	51	57	−6	65	9	5	9	28	33	−5	9	6	8	23	24	−1

Last updated: 27 April 2024.
Source: Soccerway

==== Results by round ====
Round	1	2	3	4	5	6	7	8	9	10	12	13	14	15	16	17	11^{1}	19	20	21	22	23	24	25	26	28	29	30	31	18^{2}	32	33	34	35	27^{3}	36	37	38	39	41	42	43	40	44	45	46
Ground	A	H	A	A	H	H	A	A	H	A	H	A	H	A	A	H	H	H	A	H	A	A	H	H	A	A	H	A	H	A	A	H	H	A	H	H	A	H	A	A	H	H	H	A	H	A
Result	L	L	L	D	W	L	W	D	W	L	W	W	D	D	D	L	L	D	D	L	W	L	W	D	W	W	W	D	W	W	L	W	L	W	W	L	L	D	W	L	L	W	D	L	L	W
Position	16	22	22	23	18	20	16	16	15	16	16	10	13	12	14	14	14	16	16	16	14	16	13	13	12	10	9	10	9	9	9	9	9	9	8	9	10	10	10	10	10	10	10	10	10	11

Updated to match(es) played on 27 April 2024. Source: Soccerway
A = Away; H = Home; W = Win; D = Draw; L = Loss; P = postponed
Notes:
- ^{1} Matchday 11 (vs Lincoln City) was abandoned due to a medical emergency.
- ^{2} Matchday 18 (vs Port Vale) was postponed due to international call-ups.
- ^{3} Matchday 27 (vs Blackpool) was postponed due to Blackpool's FA Cup involvement.

==== Matches ====
On 22 June, the EFL League One fixtures were released.

Win Draw Loss Fixtures

5 August 2023 1	Charlton Athletic	1–0	Leyton Orient	Charlton
15:00 BST	Dobson 45'; May (yellow card) 49'; Fraser (yellow card) 60'; Maynard-Brewer (yellow card) 90+2'	Report	Beckles (yellow card) 13'; El Mizouni (yellow card) 15'	Stadium: The Valley; Attendance: 18,512; Referee: Andrew Kitchen

12 August 2023 2	Leyton Orient	0–4	Portsmouth	Leyton
15:00 BST	Hunt (yellow card) 50'; Beckles (yellow card) 90+2'	Report	Pack 23'; Bishop 44'; Beckles 51' (o.g.); Robertson (yellow card) 68'; Yengi 90+3' (pen.) (yellow card) 90+4'	Stadium: Brisbane Road; Attendance: 8,372; Referee: Ollie Yates

15 August 2023 3	Wycombe Wanderers	3–2	Leyton Orient	High Wycombe
19:45 BST	Low 15', 68'; Stryjek (yellow card) 82'; Taylor 84'	Report	Sotiriou 36', 86'; Brown (yellow card) 42'; Happe (red card) 50'; James (yellow card) 58'; Turns (yellow card) 90+7'	Stadium: Adams Park; Attendance: 4,794; Referee: Thomas Parsons

19 August 2023 4	Blackpool	0–0	Leyton Orient	Blackpool
15:00 BST		Report	Turns (yellow card) 54'; El Mizouni (yellow card) 83'; Graham (yellow card) 90+3'; Sotiriou (yellow card) 90+4'	Stadium: Bloomfield Road; Attendance: 10,146; Referee: Marc Edwards

26 August 2023 5	Leyton Orient	2–0	Cambridge United	Leyton
15:00 BST	Galbraith (yellow card) 15'; Forde 29'; Graham (yellow card) 32'; Archibald 57' (yellow card) 82'; James (yellow card) 85'	Report	Andrew (yellow card) 45'; Ahadme (yellow card) 49'; Simper (yellow card) 68'; Okenabirhie (yellow card) 86'	Stadium: Breyer Group Stadium; Attendance: 8,266; Referee: Stephen Martin

2 September 2023 6	Leyton Orient	0–3	Stevenage	Leyton
15:00 BST	Forde (yellow card) 16'; Turns (yellow card) 32'	Report	McNeill 21'; Sweeney 44'; Freeman 79'; Roberts (yellow card) 86'	Stadium: Breyer Group Stadium; Attendance: 8,287; Referee: Scott Oldham

9 September 2023 7	Exeter City	1–2	Leyton Orient	Exeter
15:00 BST	Mitchell 48'; Borges (yellow card) 90'; Beardmore (yellow card) 90+5'; Cole (yellow card) 90+6'	Report	Archibald (yellow card) 45+2'; Pigott 55'; Pratley (yellow card) 59'; Sotiriou 90+2' (yellow card) 90+3'	Stadium: St James' Park; Attendance: 7,004; Referee: Ben Toner

16 September 2023 8	Peterborough United	1–1	Leyton Orient	Peterborough
15:00 BST	Kioso (yellow card) 6'; Kyprianou 21' (yellow card) 84'	Report	Beckles 33'; Pratley (yellow card) 43'; Graham (yellow card) 86'; El Mizouni (yellow card) 89'	Stadium: Weston Homes Stadium; Attendance: 7,945; Referee: Scott Tallis

23 September 2023 9	Leyton Orient	1–0	Shrewsbury Town	Leyton
15:00 BST	Sotiriou 20'; Pratley (yellow card) 49'; Archibald (yellow card) 52'; Forde (yellow card) 72'; James (yellow card) 75'	Report	Flanagan (yellow card) 85'	Stadium: Brisbane Road; Attendance: 8,001; Referee: Lewis Smith

30 September 2023 10	Fleetwood Town	1–0	Leyton Orient	Fleetwood
15:00 BST	Nsiala (yellow card) 50'; Marriott 56'; Johnston (yellow card) 77' (yellow-red card) 90+9'	Report	Beckles (yellow card) 52'; Sotiriou (yellow card) 89'; Brown (yellow card) 90+4'; Galbraith (yellow card) 90+4' (yellow-red card) 90+9'	Stadium: Highbury Stadium; Attendance: 3,189; Referee: Simon Mather

7 October 2023 12	Leyton Orient	2–1	Reading	Leyton
15:00 BST	Brown 26'; Hunt (yellow card) 61'; Sotiriou (yellow card) 69'; Moncur 90'; Cooper (yellow card) 90+2'	Report	Bindon (yellow card) 19', (goal) 35'; Azeez (yellow card) 70'	Stadium: Brisbane Road; Attendance: 8,639; Referee: Neil Hair

14 October 2023 13	Carlisle United	0–1	Leyton Orient	Carlisle
15:00 BST		Report	Sotiriou 21'; Brown (yellow card) 38'; Turns (yellow card) 75'; El Mizouni (yellow card) 90+3'	Stadium: Brunton Park; Attendance: 8,355; Referee: Edward Duckworth

21 October 2023 14	Leyton Orient	1–1	Barnsley	Leyton
15:00 GMT	Pigott 27' (pen.)	Report	Kane 69'; Cosgrove (yellow card) 89' (yellow-red card) 90+1'	Stadium: Brisbane Road; Attendance: 8,642; Referee: Peter Wright

24 October 2023 15	Northampton Town	2–2	Leyton Orient	Northampton
19:45 BST	Hoskins 49', 52' (pen.); Bowie (red card) 58'	Report	Happe (yellow card) 10'; Hunt 14'; Cooper (yellow card) 19'; Forde 90+6'; Turns (yellow card) 90+7'	Stadium: Sixfields Stadium; Attendance: 6,193; Referee: Jacob Miles

28 October 2023 16	Burton Albion	0–0	Leyton Orient	Burton upon Trent
15:00 GMT	Oshilaja (yellow card) 59'	Report	Brown (yellow card) 72'	Stadium: Pirelli Stadium; Attendance: 3,359; Referee: Charles Breakspear

11 November 2023 17	Leyton Orient	2–3	Oxford United	Leyton
15:00 GMT	Stevens 48' (o.g.); Sotiriou 64'; Brown (yellow card) 67'; Pratley (yellow card) 78'	Report	Rodrigues 32', 47'; Bodin 45+2'; Harris (yellow card) 59'; Moore (yellow card) 66'	Stadium: Brisbane Road; Attendance: 8,614; Referee: Declan Bourne

21 November 2023 11	Leyton Orient	0–1	Lincoln City	Leyton
19:45 GMT	Cooper (yellow card) 70'; Happe (yellow card) 78'	Report	Hamilton (yellow card) 34', (goal) 89'; Eyoma (yellow card) 53'	Stadium: Brisbane Road; Referee: Sam Allison
Note: Fixture was previously abandoned due to a medical emergency.

25 November 2023 19	Leyton Orient	1–1	Wigan Athletic	Leyton
15:00 GMT	Brynn (yellow card) 2'; Forde 18'; Pigott (yellow card) 26'; James (yellow card) 39'; Hunt (yellow card) 80'; Archibald (yellow card) 81'	Report	Humphrys (penalty missed) 2' 45+1'; Hughes (yellow card) 63'	Stadium: Brisbane Road; Attendance: 8,517; Referee: Sam Purkiss

28 November 2023 20	Bristol Rovers	1–1	Leyton Orient	Horfield
19:45 GMT	Ward 45+4'; Vale (yellow card) 90+2'	Report	Turns (yellow card) 45+3'; Sweeney (yellow card) 74'; Brown (yellow card) 90'; Crama 90+3' (o.g.)	Stadium: Memorial Stadium; Attendance: 7,048; Referee: Will Finnie

9 December 2023 21	Leyton Orient	0–3	Derby County	Leyton
15:00 GMT	El Mizouni (yellow card) 42'; Cooper (red card) 44'	Report	Hourihane (yellow card) 8'; Sibley 34'; Mendez-Laing 47'; Barkhuizen 79'	Stadium: Brisbane Road; Attendance: 8,499; Referee: David Rock

16 December 2023 22	Cheltenham Town	1–2	Leyton Orient	Cheltenham
15:00 GMT	Williams (yellow card) 17' (yellow-red card) 18'; Smith (yellow card) 47'; Goodwin 68' (pen.); Freestone (yellow card) 85'	Report	Beckles (yellow card) 3'; Sotiriou (yellow card) 32'; Brown (yellow card) 58'; Pratley (yellow card) 67'; Forde 89'; Galbraith 90+4'	Stadium: The Completely-Suzuki Stadium; Attendance: 3,887; Referee: Tom Reeves

23 December 2023 23	Bolton Wanderers	3–2	Leyton Orient	Horwich
15:00 GMT	Dacres-Cogley 3'; Charles 7'; Thomason 10'	Report	Sotiriou (yellow card) 45+4'; James (yellow card) 54'; Forde 55'; Archibald (yellow card) 57' (goal) 60'; Happe (yellow card) 84'	Stadium: Toughsheet Community Stadium; Attendance: 21,482; Referee: Charles Breakspear

26 December 2023 24	Leyton Orient	1–0	Charlton Athletic	Leyton
13:00 GMT	Happe (yellow card) 55'; Hunt (yellow card) 61'; James (yellow card) 67'; Beckles (yellow card) 76', (goal) 80'; Archibald (yellow card) 84'	Report	Dobson (yellow card) 90+2'	Stadium: Gaughan Group Stadium; Attendance: 8,499; Referee: Daniel Middleton

29 December 2023 25	Leyton Orient	0–0	Wycombe Wanderers	Leyton
15:00 GMT	Agyei (yellow card) 43'	Report		Stadium: Gaughan Group Stadium; Attendance: 8,648; Referee: Jacob Miles

1 January 2024 26	Cambridge United	0–2	Leyton Orient	Cambridge
15:00 GMT	Lankester (yellow card) 12'	Report	Beckles (yellow card) 25'; Archibald (yellow card) 39'; James (yellow card) 44'; Brown 54'; Agyei 57'; Galbraith (yellow card) 68'; Forde (yellow card) 84'	Stadium: Abbey Stadium; Attendance: 7,210; Referee: Carl Brook

13 January 2024 28	Portsmouth	0–3	Leyton Orient	Portsmouth
15:00 GMT	Bishop (penalty missed) 40'; Rafferty (yellow card) 41'	Report	Forde 30'; Brown 35' (yellow card) 89'; Galbraith (yellow card) 37'; Agyei 45+5'; Pigott (yellow card) 81'; Pratley (yellow card) 87'	Stadium: Fratton Park; Attendance: 19,477; Referee: Ben Speedie

20 January 2024 29	Leyton Orient	1–0	Bolton Wanderers	Leyton
15:00 GMT	Sweeney (yellow card) 29'; Agyei 54'	Report	Sheehan (yellow card) 13'; Jerome (yellow card) 90+3'	Stadium: Gaughan Group Stadium; Referee: Alex Chilowicz

27 January 2024 30	Reading	1–1	Leyton Orient	Reading
15:00 GMT	Knibbs 23'; Bindon (yellow card) 53'; Smith (yellow card) 53'	Report	Agyei 19' (pen.); Galbraith (yellow card) 77'	Stadium: Select Car Leasing Stadium; Referee: Graham Scott

3 February 2024 31	Leyton Orient	3–2	Carlisle United	Leyton
15:00 GMT	Forde 40', 45+4' (yellow card) 83'; Galbraith (yellow card) 56'; Sotiriou 58'; El Mizouni (yellow card) 69'; Hunt (yellow card) 81'	Report	Vela 21'; Maguire 90+5' (pen.)	Stadium: Gaughan Group Stadium; Attendance: 8,468; Referee: Ollie Yates

6 February 2024 18	Port Vale	0–1	Leyton Orient	Burslem
19:45 GMT		Report	Brown (yellow card) 10'; El Mizouni 60'; Archibald (yellow card) 74'	Stadium: Vale Park; Attendance: 4,117; Referee: Scott Jackson
Note: Fixture was originally scheduled for 18 November, but was postponed due to international call-ups.

10 February 2024 32	Barnsley	2–1	Leyton Orient	Barnsley
15:00 GMT	Connell (yellow card) 80' (yellow-red card) 89'; Phillips 88', 90+5'; Earl (yellow card) 90+3'; de Gevigney (yellow card) 90+6'	Report	Sotiriou 10'; Galbraith (yellow card) 87'; Pigott (yellow card) 90+1'; O'Neill (yellow card) 90+4'	Stadium: Oakwell; Attendance: 12,370; Referee: Ross Joyce

13 February 2024 33	Leyton Orient	4–3	Northampton Town	Leyton
19:45 GMT	El Mizouni (yellow card) 21'; O'Neill 35'; Brown (yellow card) 41'; Forde 58'; Sotiriou 80', 90+7'	Report	Gape (yellow card) 31'; Leonard 45+1'; Bowie 77'; Simpson 83'; Guthrie (yellow card) 90+6'	Stadium: Gaughan Group Stadium; Attendance: 7,228; Referee: Ben Atkinson

17 February 2024 34	Leyton Orient	1–2	Burton Albion	Leyton
15:00 GMT	Galbraith (yellow card) 26'; Moncur 43' (pen.)	Report	Nsiala (yellow card) 42' (goal) 76'; Bennett 72'	Stadium: Gaughan Group Stadium; Attendance: 7,167; Referee: Paul Howard

24 February 2024 35	Oxford United	1–2	Leyton Orient	Oxford
15:00 GMT	Murphy (yellow card) 4'; Goodrham 20'; Brown (yellow card) 57'	Report	O'Neill (yellow card) 4', (goal) 51'; El Mizouni (yellow card) 18'; Sotiriou (yellow card) 45+4'; Cooper (yellow card) 50'; Moncur 77'; Forde (yellow card) 81'; Sanders (yellow card) 90+10'	Stadium: The Kassam Stadium; Attendance: 8,884; Referee: Martin Woods

27 February 2024 27	Leyton Orient	1–0	Blackpool	Leyton
19:45 GMT	O'Neill 52'; El Mizouni (yellow card) 74'	Report	Lawrence-Gabriel (yellow card) 35'; Connolly (yellow card) 67'	Stadium: Gaughan Group Stadium; Attendance: 7,198; Referee: Ben Speedie
Note: Fixture was originally scheduled for 6 January, but was postponed due to Blackpool's FA Cup involvement.

2 March 2024 36	Leyton Orient	0–1	Bristol Rovers	Leyton
15:00 GMT	Cooper (yellow card) 83'	Report	Martin 30'; Wilson (yellow card) 44' (red card) 82'; Vale (yellow card) 58'; Finley (yellow card) 84'; Grant (yellow card) 84'	Stadium: Gaughan Group Stadium; Attendance: 8,769; Referee: Darren Drysdale

9 March 2024 37	Wigan Athletic	1–0	Leyton Orient	Wigan
15:00 GMT	Goode (yellow card) 59'; Kerr 73'	Report	Forde (yellow card) 12'; Galbraith (yellow card) 29' (yellow-red card) 42'	Stadium: DW Stadium; Attendance: 10,352; Referee: Scott Oldham

12 March 2024 38	Leyton Orient	0–0	Port Vale	Leyton
19:45 GMT		Report	Smith (yellow card) 20'	Stadium: Gaughan Group Stadium; Attendance: 7,326; Referee: Gavin Ward

16 March 2024 39	Stevenage	0–1	Leyton Orient	Stevenage
15:00 GMT	Vancooten (yellow card) 77'	Report	Sanders 16'; Pratley (yellow card) 44'; Forde (yellow card) 83'	Stadium: Broadhall Way; Attendance: 5,650; Referee: Craig Hicks

29 March 2024 41	Lincoln City	1–0	Leyton Orient	Lincoln
15:00 GMT	Hackett-Fairchild (yellow card) 19'; Makama 90'	Report	Sanders (yellow card) 55'; Brown (yellow card) 68'; Sotiriou (yellow card) 73'	Stadium: LNER Stadium; Attendance: 9,922; Referee: Carl Brook

1 April 2024 42	Leyton Orient	1–2	Peterborough United	Leyton
15:00 GMT	Galbraith 66'; Sotiriou (yellow card) 71'	Report	Kyprianou 8'; Mason-Clark 26'	Stadium: Brisbane Road; Attendance: 8,758; Referee: Sunny Singh Gill

6 April 2024 43	Leyton Orient	3–1	Cheltenham Town	Leyton
15:00 BST	Galbraith 34', (yellow card) 59'; O'Neill 44', (yellow card) 65'; Brown (yellow card) 53'; Sotiriou 85'	Report	Freestone (yellow card) 35'; Nuttall 90+7'	Stadium: Brisbane Road; Attendance: 7,804; Referee: Simon Mather

9 April 2024 40	Leyton Orient	2–2	Exeter City	Leyton
19:45 BST	O'Neill 36'; Moncur 64'	Report	Alli 88'; Aimson 90+2'	Stadium: Brisbane Road; Attendance: 7,028; Referee: Scott Jackson

13 April 2024 44	Derby County	3–0	Leyton Orient	Derby
15:00 BST	Moncur 10' (o.g.); Bradley 18', 86'; Cashin (yellow card) 82'	Report	Galbraith (yellow card) 53'	Stadium: Pride Park Stadium; Attendance: 30,247; Referee: Lewis Smith

20 April 2024 45	Leyton Orient	0–1	Fleetwood Town	Leyton
15:00 BST		Report	Rooney (yellow card) 89'; Simons 90+3'	Stadium: Gaughan Group Stadium; Attendance: 8,249; Referee: Alex Chilowicz

27 April 2024 46	Shrewsbury Town	1–3	Leyton Orient	Shrewsbury
12:30 BST	Udoh 76'	Report	Adu-Adjei 8'; Galbraith 24'; Agyei 53'	Stadium: New Meadow; Attendance: 7,397; Referee: Adam Herczeg

=== FA Cup ===
Orient were drawn at home to Carlisle United in the first round.

Win Draw Loss Fixtures

4 November 2023 First round	Leyton Orient	3–1	Carlisle United	Leyton
15:00 GMT	Cooper (yellow card) 8'; Pigott 11' (pen.); Forde (yellow card) 14'; El Mizouni (yellow card) 60'; Drinan 65'; Happe (yellow card) 70'; Sotiriou 90+1'; Sweeney (yellow card) 90+6'	Report	Garner 50'; Robinson (yellow card) 72'	Stadium: Brisbane Road; Attendance: 3,808; Referee: Seb Stockbridge

3 December 2023 Second round	Chesterfield	1–0	Leyton Orient	Chesterfield
14:00 GMT	Cooper 40' (o.g.); Banks (yellow card) 62'; Naylor (yellow card) 73'	Report	Cooper (yellow card) 61'	Stadium: SMH Group Stadium; Attendance: 8,232; Referee: Scott Oldham

=== EFL Cup ===
Leyton were drawn away to Plymouth Argyle in the first round.

Win Draw Loss Fixtures

8 August 2023 First round	Plymouth Argyle	2–0	Leyton Orient	Plymouth
19:45 BST	Waine 25', 38'; Cundle (yellow card) 48'	Report	Brown (yellow card) 22'; Pigott (yellow card) 44'; Sotiriou (yellow card) 46'; Obiero (yellow card) 90+2'; Sodje (yellow card) 90+8'	Stadium: Home Park; Attendance: 10,324; Referee: Sunny Sukhvir Gill

=== EFL Trophy ===
The Group stage draw was finalised on 22 June 2023.

Pos	Div	Team	Pld	W	PW	PL	L	GF	GA	GD	Pts	Qualification
1	L1	Portsmouth	3	2	1	0	0	10	5	+5	8	Advance to Round 2
2	ACA	Fulham U21	3	1	0	2	0	6	5	+1	5	Advance to Round 2
3	L2	Gillingham	3	1	0	0	2	3	7	−4	3	
4	L1	Leyton Orient	3	0	1	0	2	4	6	−2	2	

Updated to match(es) played on 7 November 2023. Source: EFL.com

Win Draw Loss Fixtures

5 September 2023 Group stage	Gillingham	2–1	Leyton Orient	Gillingham
19:00 BST	Coleman (yellow card) 67'; Alexander 80' (pen.); Beckles 83' (o.g.)	Report	Morris 43' (o.g.); Cooper (yellow card) 45+1' (red card) 65'; Galbraith (yellow card) 61'; Forde (red card) 62'; Sanders (yellow card) 65'; Archibald (yellow card) 81'	Stadium: Priestfield; Referee: Ben Atkinson

19 September 2023 Group stage	Leyton Orient	2–2	Fulham U21	Leyton
19:00 BST	Galbraith 9'; Brown (yellow card) 53'; El Mizouni 90+6'	Report	Šekularac 45+2'; O'Neill 60'	Stadium: Brisbane Road; Attendance: 780; Referee: Darren Drysdale
	Penalties
	Moncur (penalty scored); Graham (penalty scored); Pigott (penalty scored); Galbraith (penalty scored); El Mizouni (penalty scored)		Dibley-Dias (penalty scored); O'Neill (penalty scored); Pajaziti (penalty scored); Lanquedoc (penalty missed); Šekularac (penalty scored)

7 November 2023 Group stage	Leyton Orient	1–2	Portsmouth	Leyton
19:00 GMT	Pigott 58'	Report	Raggett (red card) 20'; Saydee 44'; Kamara 74'	Stadium: Brisbane Road; Attendance: 2,371; Referee: Stephen Parkinson

== Player statistics ==
=== Appearances and goals ===
- Players listed with no appearances have been in the matchday squad but only as unused substitutes.

No.	Pos	Nat	Player	Total		League One		FA Cup		EFL Cup		EFL Trophy	
No.	Pos	Nat	Player	Apps	Goals	Apps	Goals	Apps	Goals	Apps	Goals	Apps	Goals
Goalkeepers
1	GK	(England) ENG	Sol Brynn	45	0	42	0	2	0	0	0	1	0
13	GK	(England) ENG	Sam Howes	7	0	4	0	0	0	1	0	2	0
Defenders
2	DF	(Wales) WAL	Tom James	48	0	34+9	0	2	0	1	0	1+1	0
4	DF	(England) ENG	Jack Simpson	5	0	4+1	0	0	0	0	0	0	0
5	DF	(England) ENG	Dan Happe	35	0	26+4	0	2	0	1	0	1+1	0
12	DF	(Wales) WAL	Brandon Cooper	31	0	25+4	0	1	0	0	0	1	0
19	DF	(Grenada) GRN	Omar Beckles	38	2	33+2	2	0	0	1	0	2	0
24	DF	(England) ENG	Jayden Sweeney	17	0	9+4	0	0+1	0	0+1	0	2	0
32	DF	(England) ENG	Rob Hunt	38	1	18+16	1	1	0	1	0	2	0
40	DF	(England) ENG	Phillip Chinedu	0	0	0	0	0	0	0	0	0	0
Midfielders
11	MF	(Scotland) SCO	Theo Archibald	36	2	29+1	2	2	0	0+1	0	2+1	0
12	MF	(England) ENG	Jordan Brown	49	3	36+8	3	2	0	1	0	2	0
14	MF	(England) ENG	George Moncur	41	4	20+15	4	0+2	0	1	0	2+1	0
15	MF	(Tunisia) TUN	Idris El Mizouni	45	2	39+1	1	2	0	0+1	0	0+2	1
18	MF	(England) ENG	Darren Pratley	37	0	15+18	0	0+2	0	0	0	2	0
21	MF	(Republic of Ireland) IRL	Ollie O'Neill	17	5	13+4	5	0	0	0	0	0	0
22	MF	(Northern Ireland) NIR	Ethan Galbraith	45	5	29+10	4	1+1	0	1	0	2+1	1
23	MF	(England) ENG	Max Sanders	30	1	9+18	1	1	0	0	0	2	0
29	MF	(Kenya) KEN	Zech Obiero	8	0	3+3	0	0	0	0+1	0	1	0
34	MF	(England) ENG	Charlie Pegrum	8	0	0+4	0	0	0	0+1	0	1+2	0
36	MF	(Jamaica) JAM	Makai Welch	0	0	0	0	0	0	0	0	0	0
38	MF	(England) ENG	Abdi Mohamud	0	0	0	0	0	0	0	0	0	0
Forwards
7	FW	(England) ENG	Dan Agyei	18	5	7+10	5	0+1	0	0	0	0	0
9	FW	(England) ENG	Joe Pigott	42	4	20+16	2	1+1	1	1	0	1+2	1
10	FW	(Cyprus) CYP	Ruel Sotiriou	47	12	36+6	11	1+1	1	1	0	1+1	0
17	FW	(England) ENG	Shaq Forde	43	9	26+14	9	2	0	0	0	1	0
20	FW	(England) ENG	Daniel Adu-Adjei	10	1	2+8	1	0	0	0	0	0	0
24	FW	(England) ENG	Jordan Graham	18	0	9+7	0	0	0	1	0	0+1	0
47	FW	(England) ENG	Khayon Edwards	7	0	4+3	0	0	0	0	0	0	0
Out on Loan
25	DF	(England) ENG	Harrison Sodje	1	0	0	0	0	0	0+1	0	0	0
27	GK	(England) ENG	Rhys Byrne	0	0	0	0	0	0	0	0	0	0
Left the club during the Season
16	FW	(Republic of Ireland) IRL	Aaron Drinan	15	1	3+9	0	0+1	1	0	0	2	0
43	DF	(Wales) WAL	Ed Turns	17	0	10+3	0	2	0	0	0	2	0

Last updated: 27 April 2024
Source: Competitions

=== Top scorers ===
Includes all competitive matches. The list is sorted by squad number when total goals are equal.

Last updated 27 April 2024

Rank	No.	Nationality	Player	League One	FA Cup	EFL Cup	EFL Trophy	Total
1	10	(Cyprus)	Ruel Sotiriou	11	1	0	0	12
2	17	(England)	Shaq Forde	9	0	0	0	9
3	7	(England)	Dan Agyei	5	0	0	0	5
3	21	(Republic of Ireland)	Ollie O'Neill	5	0	0	0	5
3	22	(Northern Ireland)	Ethan Galbraith	4	0	0	1	5
6	9	(England)	Joe Pigott	2	1	0	1	4
6	14	(England)	George Moncur	4	0	0	0	4
8	12	(England)	Jordan Brown	3	0	0	0	3
9	11	(Scotland)	Theo Archibald	2	0	0	0	2
9	15	(Tunisia)	Idris El Mizouni	1	0	0	1	2
9	19	(Grenada)	Omar Beckles	2	0	0	0	2
12	16	(Republic of Ireland)	Aaron Drinan	0	1	0	0	1
12	20	(England)	Daniel Adu-Adjei	1	0	0	0	1
12	23	(England)	Max Sanders	1	0	0	0	1
12	32	(England)	Rob Hunt	1	0	0	0	1
Own goals				2	0	0	1	3
TOTALS				53	3	0	4	60
