= Harrison Sodje =

English footballer

Personal information
- Date of birth: 5 November 2003 (age 22)
- Place of birth: Lambeth, England
- Position: Defender

Team information
- Current team: Hampton & Richmond

Youth career
- Chelsea
- Charlton Athletic
- 2020–2022: Leyton Orient

Senior career*
Years	Team	Apps	(Gls)
2022–2024	Leyton Orient	0	(0)
2022	→ Aveley (loan)	3	(0)
2022	→ Heybridge Swifts (loan)	4	(0)
2022–2023	→ Cray Wanderers (loan)	21	(3)
2023–2024	→ Bishop's Stortford (loan)	11	(0)
2024	→ Dartford (loan)	6	(0)
2024	Cray Wanderers	2	(0)
2025–2026	Dover Athletic	1	(0)
- * Club domestic league appearances and goals as of 11:58, 21 September 2025 (UTC)

Harrison Sodje (born 5 November 2003) is an English professional footballer who plays as a defender for National League South club Dover Athletic.

== Career ==
=== Leyton Orient ===
Sodje joined Leyton Orient in 2020, having previously played in the academies at Chelsea and Charlton Athletic.

Sodje signed his first professional contract with Orient in the summer of 2022, and accompanied the squad on a pre-season trip to Portugal, playing in matches with the first team.

Sodje signed a one-year contract extension with Orient in June 2023.

Sodje made his senior debut for Leyton Orient in the 2–0 EFL Cup defeat at Plymouth Argyle on 8 August, coming on as a 85th minute substitute for Ethan Galbraith.

On 30 April 2024, it was confirmed Sodje would leave Leyton Orient following the expiration of his contract.

==== Aveley (loan) ====
In March 2022, Sodje went on loan to Isthmian League club Aveley.

==== Heybridge Swifts ====
In August 2022, Sodje went on loan to another Isthmian League club, Heybridge Swifts.

==== Cray Wanderers (loan) ====
In October 2022, Sodje signed for Cray Wanderers on a month-long loan, which was later extended.

==== Bishop's Stortford (loan) ====
In October 2023, he joined National League North club Bishop's Stortford on an initial loan until 30 November.

==== Dartford (loan) ====
On 22 March 2024, Sodje joined Dartford on loan for the rest of the 2023-24 season.

=== Dover Athletic ===
In September 2025, Sodje joined National League South club Dover Athletic.

== Personal life ==
Sodje is of Nigerian descent and is related to Sam Sodje.

== Career statistics ==
As of match played 16 April 2024

Club	Season	League			FA Cup		EFL Cup		Other		Total	
Club	Season	Division	Apps	Goals	Apps	Goals	Apps	Goals	Apps	Goals	Apps	Goals
Leyton Orient	2021–22	League Two	0	0	0	0	0	0	0	0	0	0
Leyton Orient	2022–23	League Two	0	0	0	0	0	0	0	0	0	0
Leyton Orient	2023–24	League One	0	0	0	0	1	0	0	0	1	0
Leyton Orient	Leyton Orient total		0	0	0	0	1	0	0	0	1	0
Aveley (loan)	2021–22	Isthmian League North Division	3	0	—		—		—		3	0
Heybridge Swifts (loan)	2022–23	Isthmian League North Division	4	0	5	0	—		2 (Note: Appearances in FA Trophy)	1	11	1
Cray Wanderers (loan)	2022–23	Isthmian League Premier Division	21	3	—		—		3 (Note: Appearances in London Senior Cup) (Note: Appearance in Isthmian League Premier Division play-offs)	0	24	3
Bishop's Stortford (loan)	2023–24	National League North	11	0	—		—		1	0	12	0
Dartford (loan)	2023–24	National League South	6	0	—		—		1 (Note: One appearance in the London Senior Cup)	0	7	0
Career total			45	3	5	0	1	0	7	1	58	4
