= Charlie Pegrum =

English footballer

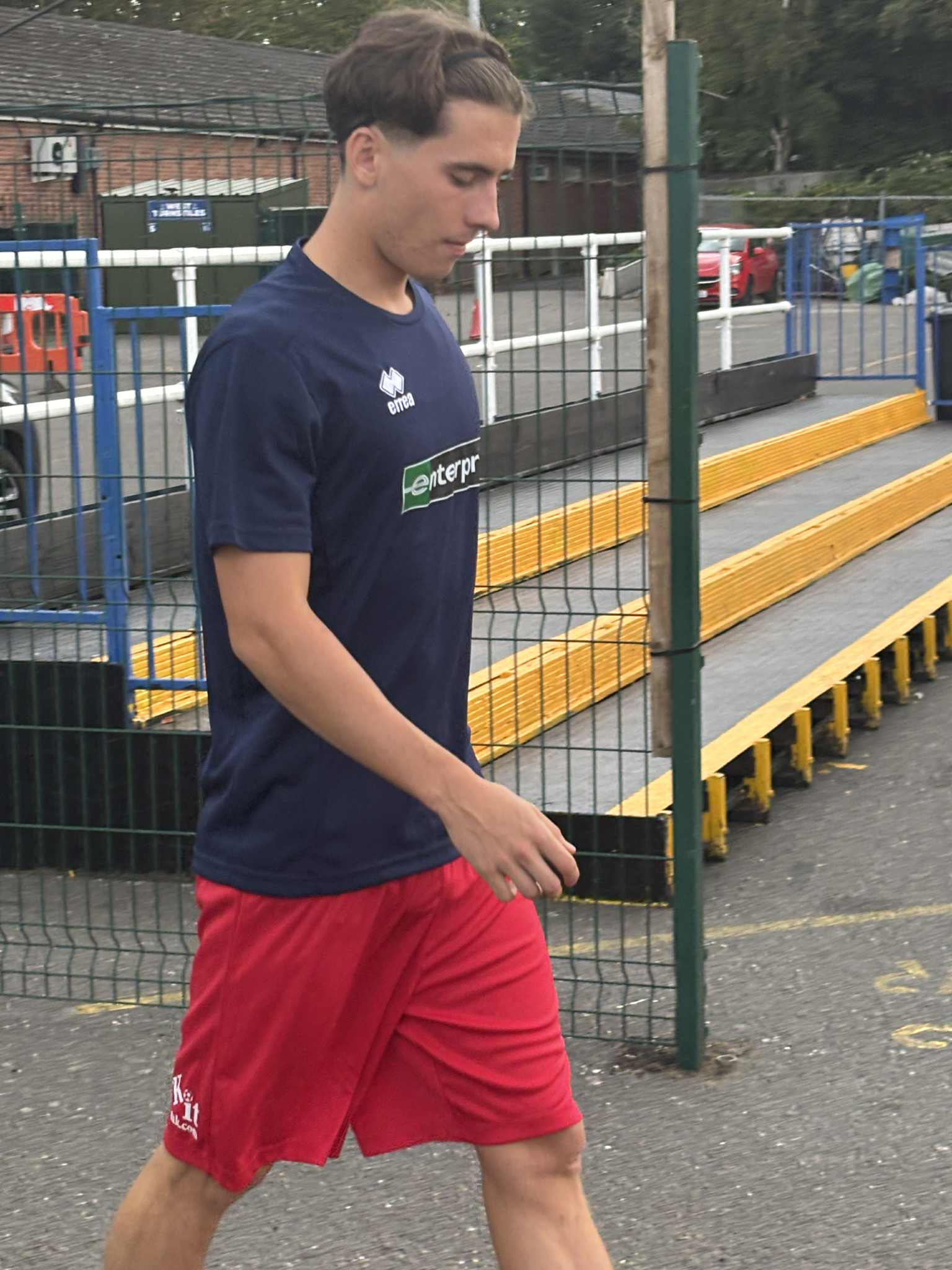
- Charlie Pegrum

Personal information
- Full name: Charlie Joe Pegrum
- Date of birth: 11 October 2004 (age 22)
- Place of birth: Harlow, England
- Height: 1.80 m (5 ft 11 in)
- Positions: Right midfielder; right winger

Team information
- Current team: Hornchurch
- Number: 14

Youth career
- –2023: Leyton Orient

Senior career*
Years	Team	Apps	(Gls)
2023–2025	Leyton Orient	4	(0)
2023	→ Tonbridge Angels (loan)	5	(0)
2023–2024	→ Aveley (loan)	3	(0)
2024	→ Welling United (loan)	8	(0)
2024–2025	→ Tonbridge Angels (loan)	9	(0)
2025	→ Hornchurch (loan)	17	(2)
2025–	Hornchurch	41	(1)
- * Club domestic league appearances and goals as of 17:39, 2 July 2026 (UTC)

Charlie Joe Pegrum (born 11 October 2004) is an English professional footballer who plays as a right midfielder or right winger for Hornchurch.

== Career ==
Pegrum made his senior debut for Leyton Orient in the 1–0 league defeat at Charlton Athletic on 5 August 2023, coming on as a 90th minute substitute for Theo Archibald. He then played in the 2–0 EFL Cup defeat at Plymouth Argyle on 8 August, coming on as a 66th minute substitute for George Moncur.

On 16 July 2025, Pegrum returned to National League South club Hornchurch on a permanent deal following a loan spell the previous season.

== Career statistics ==
As of match played 19 August 2023

Appearances and goals by club, season and competition
Club	Season	League			FA Cup		EFL Cup		Other		Total	
Club	Season	Division	Apps	Goals	Apps	Goals	Apps	Goals	Apps	Goals	Apps	Goals
Leyton Orient	2023–24	League Two	4	0	0	0	1	0	0	0	5	0
Tonbridge Angels (loan)	2023–24	National League South	5	0	—		—		—		5	0
Aveley (loan)	2023–24	National League South	3	0	—		—		—		3	0
Career total			12	0	0	0	1	0	0	0	13	0

== Honours ==
Hornchurch

- National League South play-offs: 2026
