= Jordan Brown (footballer, born 2001) =

English footballer

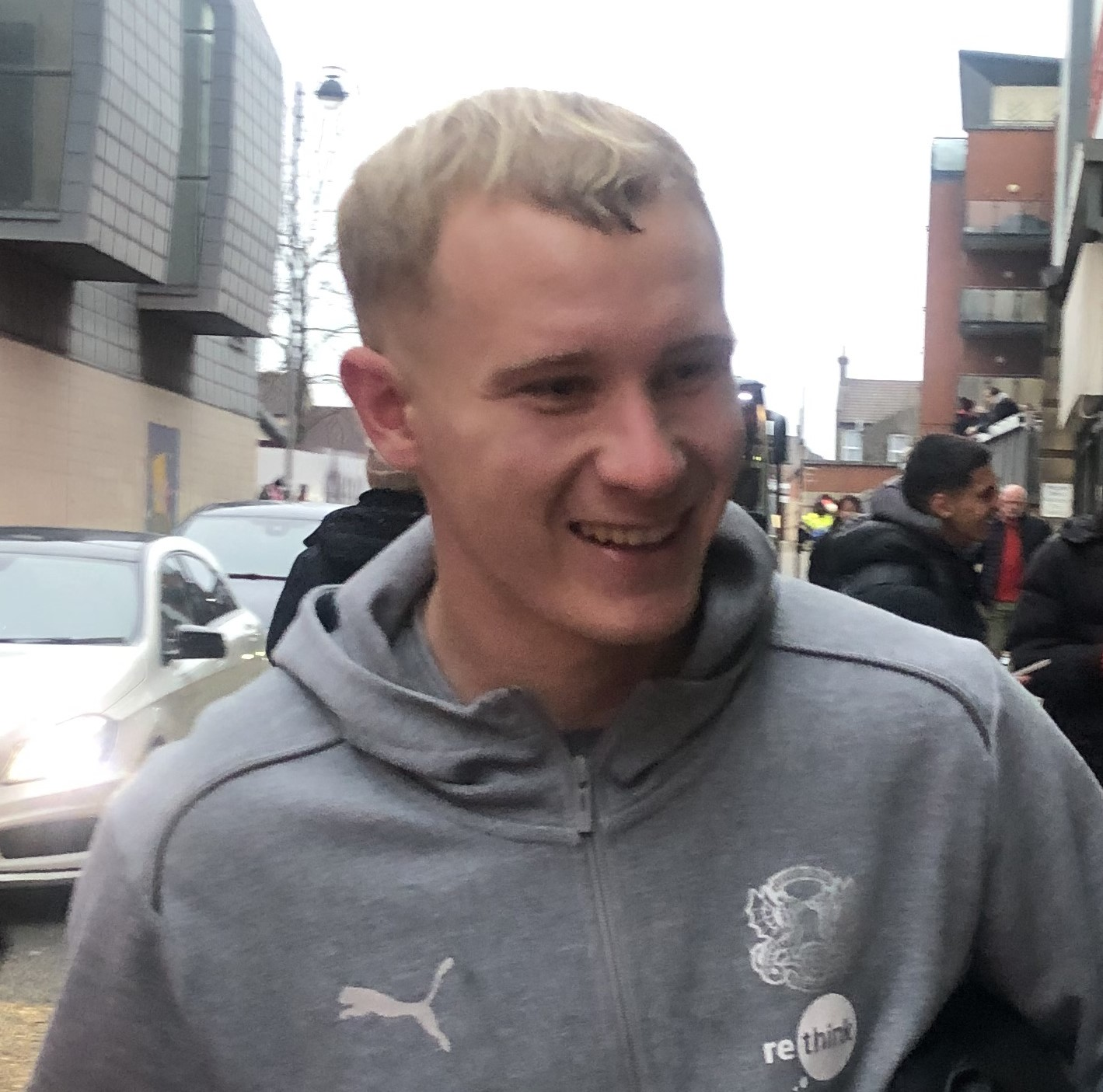
- Brown in 2024

Personal information
- Full name: Jordan Brian Brown
- Date of birth: 21 June 2001 (age 25)
- Place of birth: Stoke-on-Trent, England
- Height: 1.81 m (5 ft 11 in)
- Position: Defensive midfielder

Team information
- Current team: Blackpool
- Number: 6

Youth career
- –2020: Derby County

Senior career*
Years	Team	Apps	(Gls)
2020–2022	Derby County	1	(0)
2022–2025	Leyton Orient	133	(7)
2025–	Blackpool	49	(2)
- * Club domestic league appearances and goals as of 20 September 2026 (UTC)

Jordan Brian Brown (born 21 June 2001) is an English professional footballer who plays as a defensive midfielder for EFL League One club Blackpool.

== Career ==
=== Derby County ===
On 3 July 2019, Brown signed his first professional contract with Derby County. He made his professional debut for the club on 8 July 2020, as a substitute in a 2–0 away defeat to West Bromwich Albion.

=== Leyton Orient ===
On 24 January 2022, Brown signed an 18-month contract with EFL League Two side Leyton Orient. He made his debut for the club on 25 January 2022, in a 1–0 defeat to Newport County. His first goal for the club came on 23 April 2022, in a 4–2 defeat to Northampton Town. On 16 May 2023, he signed a new two-year contract with the club. On 8 August 2024, he signed a further contract extension with the club until 2026.

=== Blackpool ===
On 8 July 2025, Brown signed for Blackpool on a four-year contract for an undisclosed fee. He made his debut for the club on 2 August 2025, in a 3–2 defeat to Stevenage. He scored his first goal for the club on 20 September 2025, in a 1–0 win against Barnsley.

== Career statistics ==
As of 15 August 2026

Appearances and goals by club, season and competition
Club	Season	League			FA Cup		League Cup		Other		Total	
Club	Season	Division	Apps	Goals	Apps	Goals	Apps	Goals	Apps	Goals	Apps	Goals
Derby County	2019–20	Championship	1	0	0	0	0	0	—		1	0
Derby County	2020–21	Championship	0	0	0	0	1	0	—		1	0
Derby County	2021–22	Championship	0	0	0	0	2	0	—		2	0
Derby County	Total		1	0	0	0	3	0	0	0	4	0
Leyton Orient	2021–22	League Two	11	1	0	0	0	0	—		11	1
Leyton Orient	2022–23	League Two	34	1	1	0	1	0	3 (Note: Appearances in EFL Trophy)	0	39	1
Leyton Orient	2023–24	League One	44	3	2	0	1	0	2	0	49	3
Leyton Orient	2024–25	League One	44	2	4	0	2	0	5 (Note: Three appearances in the EFL Trophy, two appearances in the EFL League One play-offs)	0	55	2
Leyton Orient	Total		133	7	7	0	4	0	10	0	154	7
Blackpool	2025–26	League One	45	1	3	0	1	0	3	0	52	1
Blackpool	2026–27	League One	1	0	0	0	1	0	0	0	2	0
Blackpool	Total		46	1	3	0	2	0	3	0	54	1
Career total			180	8	10	0	9	0	13	0	212	8

== Honours ==
Leyton Orient

- EFL League Two: 2022–23
