= Ruel Sotiriou =

Cypriot footballer (born 2000)

Personal information
- Full name: Ruel Dimitrios Sotiriou
- Date of birth: 24 August 2000 (age 26)
- Place of birth: Edmonton, England
- Height: 1.80 m (5 ft 11 in)
- Position: Striker

Team information
- Current team: Chesterfield
- Number: 17

Youth career
- –2017: Leyton Orient

Senior career*
| Years | Team | Apps | (Gls) |
| 2017–2024 | Leyton Orient | 153 | (35) |
| 2017–2018 | → Heybridge Swifts (loan) | 3 | (2) |
| 2018 | → Leatherhead (loan) | 3 | (1) |
| 2018 | → Bishop's Stortford (loan) | 3 | (0) |
| 2018–2019 | → Chelmsford City (loan) | 2 | (0) |
| 2019 | → Hampton & Richmond (loan) | 9 | (6) |
| 2019 | → Dover Athletic (loan) | 2 | (2) |
| 2024–2026 | Bristol Rovers | 51 | (6) |
| 2026 | Hapoel Jerusalem | 9 | (0) |
| 2026– | Chesterfield | 1 | (0) |

International career^{‡}
| 2019 | Cyprus U19 | 3 | (0) |
| 2019–2021 | Cyprus U21 | 8 | (3) |
| 2024 | Cyprus | 1 | (0) |
- * Club domestic league appearances and goals as of 26 September 2026 ‡ National team caps and goals as of 22 March 2024 (UTC)

Ruel Dimitrios Sotiriou (Greek: Ρουέλ Δημήτριος Σωτηρίου; born 24 August 2000) is a professional footballer who plays as a striker for EFL League Two club Chesterfield. Born in England, he has represented Cyprus at under-19, under-21 and full international levels.

== Club career ==
=== Leyton Orient ===
==== Debut and early loans ====
Sotiriou made his first team debut for Orient as a substitute in the goalless draw with Dagenham & Redbridge in the FA Cup fourth qualifying round on 14 October 2017. He then made further substitute appearances in two home league defeats against Macclesfield Town and Gateshead in late October. On 4 November, he appeared as a late substitute for Zain Westbrooke in the 2–1 defeat at Gillingham in the FA Cup first round. He then played in the 3–0 league defeat at Torquay United on 25 November.

He joined Heybridge Swifts on a month's loan in December 2017, scoring on his debut in the 3–3 draw at Waltham Abbey on 30 December. He also scored in the 3–3 draw with Grays Athletic on 6 January 2018.

On 29 January he made a further switch to Leatherhead on a work experience deal. Again he scored on his debut, opening the scoring in the second minute of Leatherhead's 4–1 win at Hendon on 30 January.

On 18 September 2018, Sotiriou went on loan to Bishop's Stortford of the Isthmian League Premier Division, making four appearances. At the end of October, he made a fourth loan move, this time to National League South club Chelmsford City, where he made two appearances.

On 22 February 2019, Sotiriou went on a month's loan to Hampton & Richmond Borough, which was later extended until the end of the season. He scored six goals in nine appearances for Hampton, including both goals in the 2–1 win at home to Wealdstone on 13 April.

==== Dover Athletic and return to Orient ====
On 1 November 2019, he joined National League side Dover Athletic on a month's loan. His debut came in the FA Cup first round tie at home to League One side Southend United on 10 November. Coming on as an 81st-minute substitute for Steven Rigg, Sotiriou scored the only goal of the game three minutes later. He later said, "For the goal I literally took a touch out of my feet, I was going to square it to Inih but I thought 'No I'm going to take a shot'." On 26 November, Sotiriou scored twice in the 4–3 league defeat at home to Maidenhead United.

Returning to Orient on 28 November, Sotiriou came on as a second-half substitute for Conor Wilkinson in the EFL Trophy second round match at Bristol Rovers on 4 December. The tie ended 1–1, and Sotiriou missed the last penalty as Orient lost 4–2 in the shoot-out.

Sotiriou made his Football League debut on 26 December 2019, coming on as a second-half substitute for Dan Happe, and scoring in the 3–1 home defeat to Colchester United. He scored in the second minute of his next match, the 1–1 draw at Newport County on 29 December.

After scoring six goals in eight matches, Sotiriou was awarded the EFL League Two Player of the Month award for March 2022, his goals helping steer Orient away from the relegation zone.

Following the conclusion of the 2023–24 season, Sotiriou was offered a new contract.

=== Bristol Rovers ===
On 26 June 2024, Sotiriou agreed to join fellow League One side Bristol Rovers on a three-year deal with the option for a further season. Although the striker was due to be out of contract, an undisclosed fee was agreed in order to avoid the need for a compensation committee hearing. On 7 September 2024, he scored a first goal for the club, capitalising on a defensive mix-up to equalise in an eventual 2–1 defeat to Barnsley. Following a slow start to his time with the club, his form improved during the second half of the season, Sotiriou himself attributing this to the sacking of previous manager Matt Taylor and subsequent appointment of Iñigo Calderón.

On 22 November 2025, following a 1–0 loss to Cheltenham Town, a seventh consecutive league defeat that left the Gas 20th in League Two, Sotiriou and teammate Shaq Forde's intensity in training were criticised by manager Darrell Clarke following the pair's omission from the matchday squad.

=== Hapoel Jerusalem ===
On 21 January 2026, Sotiriou signed for Israeli Premier League club Hapoel Jerusalem for an undisclosed fee.

== International career ==
Sotiriou made his debut for Cyprus internationally in March 2019 when he appeared in the 2020 UEFA European Under-19 Championship qualification for Cyprus, but these were cancelled during the qualification due to COVID-19. He first appeared with the Cyprus U21 team in their attempt to qualify for the 2021 UEFA European Under-21 Championship in the autumn of 2019.

Sotiriou made his debut for the senior Cyprus national team on 21 March 2024 in a friendly against Latvia.

== Career statistics ==
As of 24 June 2026

Appearances and goals by club, season and competition
| Club | Season | League | | | FA Cup | | League Cup | | Other | | Total | |
| Club | Season | Division | Apps | Goals | Apps | Goals | Apps | Goals | Apps | Goals | Apps | Goals |
|---|---|---|---|---|---|---|---|---|---|---|---|---|
| Leyton Orient | 2017–18 | National League | 3 | 0 | 2 | 0 | 0 | 0 | 1 (Note: Appearance(s) in FA Trophy) | 0 | 6 | 0 |
| Leyton Orient | 2019–20 | League Two | 10 | 5 | 0 | 0 | 0 | 0 | 1 (Note: Appearances in the Football League Trophy) | 0 | 11 | 5 |
| Leyton Orient | 2020–21 | League Two | 22 | 1 | 0 | 0 | 1 | 0 | 2 | 0 | 25 | 1 |
| Leyton Orient | 2021–22 | League Two | 34 | 9 | 1 | 0 | 1 | 0 | 4 | 2 | 40 | 11 |
| Leyton Orient | 2022–23 | League Two | 42 | 9 | 1 | 0 | 0 | 0 | 2 | 0 | 45 | 9 |
| Leyton Orient | 2023–24 | League One | 42 | 11 | 2 | 1 | 1 | 0 | 2 | 0 | 47 | 12 |
| Leyton Orient | Total | | 153 | 35 | 6 | 1 | 3 | 0 | 12 | 2 | 174 | 38 |
| Heybridge Swifts (loan) | 2017–18 | Isthmian League North Division | 3 | 2 | 0 | 0 | — | | 0 | 0 | 3 | 2 |
| Leatherhead (loan) | 2017–18 | Isthmian League Premier Division | 3 | 1 | 0 | 0 | — | | 0 | 0 | 3 | 1 |
| Bishop's Stortford (loan) | 2018–19 | Isthmian League Premier Division | 3 | 0 | 0 | 0 | — | | 1 | 1 | 4 | 1 |
| Chelmsford City (loan) | 2018–19 | National League South | 2 | 0 | 0 | 0 | — | | 0 | 0 | 2 | 0 |
| Hampton & Richmond (loan) | 2018–19 | National League South | 9 | 6 | 0 | 0 | — | | 0 | 0 | 9 | 6 |
| Dover Athletic (loan) | 2019–20 | National League | 2 | 2 | 1 | 1 | — | | 0 | 0 | 3 | 3 |
| Bristol Rovers | 2024–25 | League One | 37 | 6 | 3 | 0 | 1 | 0 | 2 | 0 | 43 | 6 |
| Bristol Rovers | 2025–26 | League Two | 14 | 0 | 1 | 0 | 1 | 0 | 2 | 0 | 18 | 0 |
| Bristol Rovers | Total | | 51 | 6 | 4 | 0 | 2 | 0 | 4 | 0 | 61 | 6 |
| Hapoel Jerusalem | 2025–26 | Israeli Premier League | 9 | 0 | 0 | 0 | — | | 0 | 0 | 9 | 0 |
| Career total | | | 235 | 52 | 11 | 2 | 4 | 0 | 17 | 3 | 267 | 57 |

== Honours ==
Leyton Orient

- EFL League Two: 2022–23

Individual

- EFL League Two Player of the Month: March 2022
