= Ed Turns =

Welsh footballer (born 2002)

Personal information
- Full name: Edward James Turns
- Date of birth: 18 October 2002 (age 24)
- Place of birth: Brighton, England
- Height: 1.85 m (6 ft 1 in)
- Position: Centre-back

Team information
- Current team: Exeter City
- Number: 4

Youth career
- 2014–2023: Brighton & Hove Albion

Senior career*
Years	Team	Apps	(Gls)
2021–2025	Brighton & Hove Albion	0	(0)
2023	→ Leyton Orient (loan)	16	(2)
2023–2024	→ Leyton Orient (loan)	13	(0)
2024	→ Crewe Alexandra (loan)	12	(1)
2025–	Exeter City	27	(0)

International career^{‡}
2022–2024	Wales U21	4	(0)
- * Club domestic league appearances and goals as of 17:15, 8 November 2025 (UTC) ‡ National team caps and goals as of 17:24, 15 October 2024

Edward James Turns (born 18 October 2002) is a professional footballer who plays as a centre-back for EFL League Two club Exeter City. He is a former Wales under-21 national international.

== Club career ==
=== Brighton & Hove Albion ===
Turns debuted for the Brighton first-team in a 2–0 EFL Cup win over Swansea City on 22 September 2021. He was involved in a Premier League matchday squad for the first time on 15 December, remaining as an unused substitute in the 1–0 home loss against Wolverhampton Wanderers.

==== Leyton Orient loan: Promotion to League One ====
On 13 January 2023, Turns signed for EFL League Two club Leyton Orient on loan until the end of the season. He made his debut for The O's the next day, playing in his first ever professional league game where he picked up a yellow card in the 0–0 home draw against Barrow. Turns scored his first professional goal on 7 February, opening the scoreline in the 2–0 away win over Crewe. Four days later, he scored again, scoring the equaliser, earning Leyton Orient a point in the 1–1 away draw at Walsall. Turns helped Orient to promotion to League One, being confirmed during their 2–0 defeat at Gillingham on 18 April. Four days later, Turns played in the 2–0 home win over Crewe, securing the league title.

==== Signing new Brighton contract ====
On 3 July 2023, Turns signed a new contract with Brighton & Hove Albion that runs until June 2025, with a club option for an extra year.

==== Second loan spell with Leyton Orient ====
On 1 August 2023, Turns returned to Leyton Orient, this time on a season-long loan.

==== Loan to Crewe Alexandra ====
On 1 February 2024, after being recalled early from his loan at Leyton Orient, Turns went on loan to League Two side Crewe Alexandra until the end of the season. He made his Crewe debut two days later in their goal-less draw at Tranmere Rovers. In his third appearance, he scored his first Crewe goal in the side's 3–1 win at Stockport County on 13 February 2024.

=== Exeter City ===
On 3 February 2025, Turns transferred to Exeter City for an undisclosed fee, signing a two-and-a-half year contract. Turns made his debut for Exeter in an FA Cup - 4th Round tie with Premier League side, Nottingham Forest. Exeter held Nottingham Forest to a 2–2 draw and lost the fixture 4–2 on penalties. Turns was sent off in the 87th minute of the match.

== International career ==
Turns was called up to the Wales under-21 squad in March 2022 for the 2023 European under-21 Championship qualifying matches against Switzerland and Bulgaria. He made his debut for the Young Dragons almost three months later on 11 June, playing the whole match of the 1–0 home defeat against the Netherlands in a Euro qualifier.

== Career statistics ==
As of match played 11 November 2025

Appearances and goals by club, season and competition
Club	Season	League			FA Cup		EFL Cup		Other		Total	
Club	Season	Division	Apps	Goals	Apps	Goals	Apps	Goals	Apps	Goals	Apps	Goals
Brighton & Hove Albion	2020-21	Premier League	0	0	0	0	0	0	2 (Note: Appearances in Football League Trophy)	0	2	0
Brighton & Hove Albion	2021-22	Premier League	0	0	0	0	1	0	3	0	4	0
Brighton & Hove Albion	2022-23	Premier League	0	0	0	0	1	0	2	0	3	0
Brighton & Hove Albion	2023-24	Premier League	0	0	0	0	0	0	0	0	0	0
Brighton & Hove Albion	2024-25	Premier League	0	0	0	0	0	0	1	0	1	0
Brighton & Hove Albion	Total		0	0	0	0	2	0	8	0	10	0
Leyton Orient (loan)	2022-23	League Two	16	2	0	0	0	0	0	0	16	2
Leyton Orient (loan)	2023-24	League One	13	0	2	0	0	0	2	0	17	0
Leyton Orient (loan)	Total		29	2	2	0	0	0	2	0	33	2
Crewe Alexandra (loan)	2023-24	League Two	12	1	0	0	0	0	2 (Note: Appearances in EFL League Two Playoffs.)	0	14	1
Exeter City	2024-25	League One	13	0	1	0	0	0	0	0	14	0
Exeter City	2025-26	League One	14	0	1	0	0	0	2	1	17	1
Exeter City	Total		27	0	2	0	0	0	2	1	31	1
Career total			68	3	4	0	2	0	14	1	88	4

== Honours ==
Leyton Orient

- EFL League Two: 2022–23
