= Brandon Cooper =

Welsh footballer (born 2000)

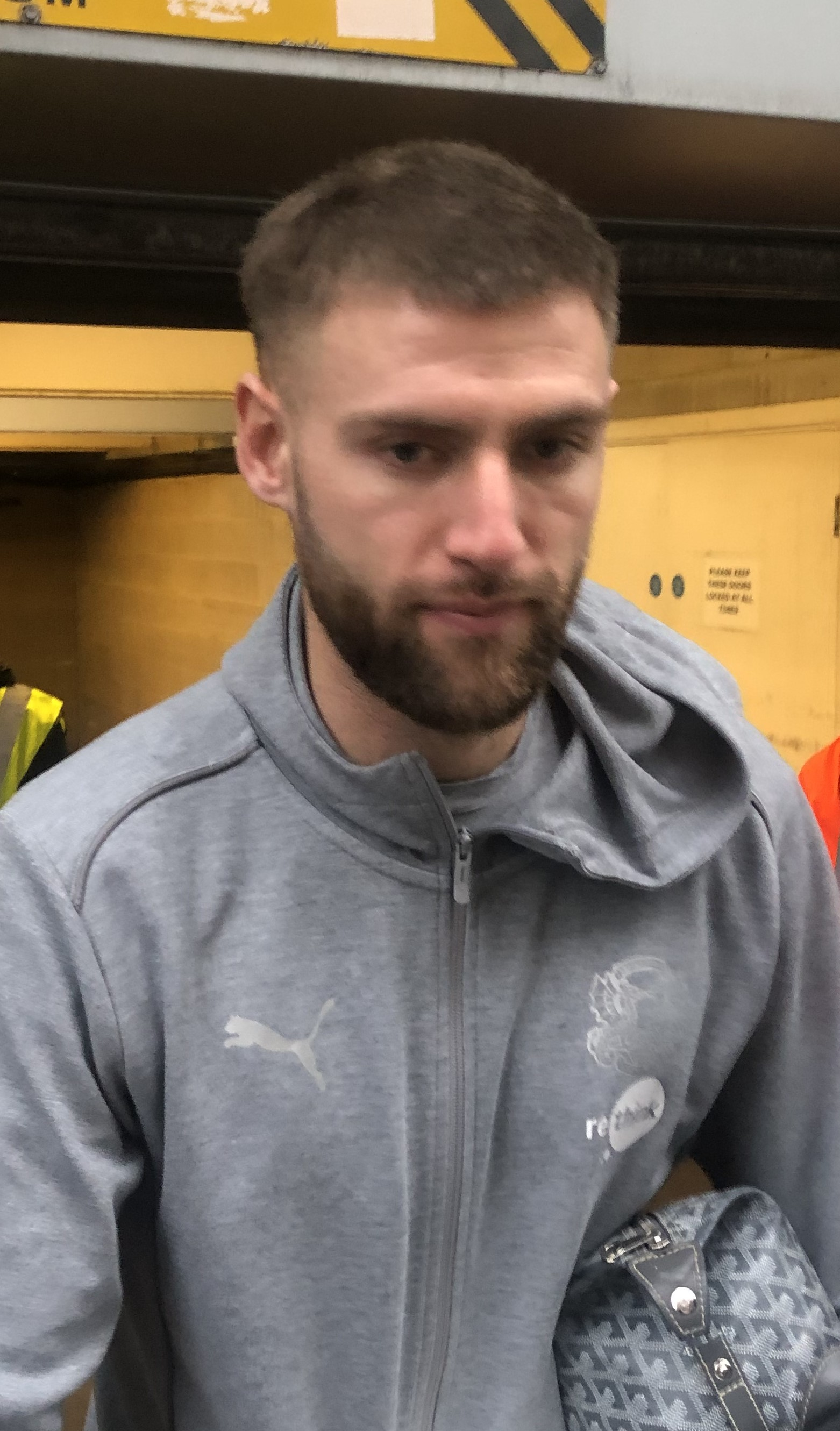
- Brandon Cooper in 2024.

Personal information
- Full name: Brandon James Cooper
- Date of birth: 14 January 2000 (age 26)
- Place of birth: Porthcawl, Wales
- Height: 1.85 m (6 ft 1 in)
- Position: Centre-back

Team information
- Current team: Salford City
- Number: 15

Youth career
- 2006–2018: Swansea City

Senior career*
Years	Team	Apps	(Gls)
2018–2024	Swansea City	5	(0)
2020	→ Yeovil Town (loan)	3	(0)
2020–2021	→ Newport County (loan)	19	(1)
2022	→ Swindon Town (loan)	8	(0)
2023	→ Forest Green Rovers (loan)	21	(0)
2023–2024	→ Leyton Orient (loan)	14	(0)
2024–2025	Leyton Orient	45	(0)
2025–	Salford City	35	(0)

International career^{‡}
	Wales U17	7	
	Wales U19	8	
2018–2021	Wales U21	9	(0)
- * Club domestic league appearances and goals as of 08:23, 16 July 2026 (UTC) ‡ National team caps and goals as of 21:43, 17 November 2020 (UTC)

Brandon James Cooper (born 14 January 2000) is a Welsh professional footballer who plays as a centre-back for EFL League Two club Salford City. He is a former Wales Under-21 international.

Cooper began his career with Swansea City, coming through the clubs academy before making his début in 2018. However, he failed to make the breakthrough into the first-team, and spent time on loan at National League club Yeovil Town, Newport County and Swindon Town in League Two, and League One teams Forest Green Rovers and Leyton Orient, where he signed permanently in 2024. After 18 months he signed for Salford.

== Club career ==
=== Swansea City and various loans ===
Cooper had been at Swansea since the age of 6. He played for the Swansea under-18s and under-23s then signed a professional contract extension in March 2018. He was handed his debut for Swansea on 28 August 2018 in a 1–0 defeat to Crystal Palace in the EFL Cup.

On 7 February 2020, Cooper joined National League side Yeovil Town on loan until the end of the 2019–20 season.

On 7 September 2020, Cooper joined League Two side Newport County on a season-long loan. He made his debut for Newport the next day, starting a 1–0 EFL Trophy defeat to Cheltenham Town. He made his football league debut on 12 September as a half time substitute for Matt Dolan in the 1–1 draw for Newport County against Scunthorpe United on the first day of the 2020–21 League Two season. Cooper scored his first football league goal for Newport in a 2–1 league win against Harrogate Town on 31 October. Cooper was selected as the October EFL Young Player of the Month. On 5 January 2021, his loan at Newport ended when he was recalled by Swansea.

On 29 January 2022, Cooper joined League Two side Swindon Town on loan for the remainder of the 2021–22 season. Cooper made his Swindon debut in the starting line-up for a League Two 1–1 draw against Crawley Town on 2 February.

On 2 January 2023, Cooper signed for League One club Forest Green Rovers on loan until the end of the 2022–23 season.

=== Leyton Orient and Salford City ===
On 1 September 2023, Cooper joined League One club Leyton Orient on loan until January 2024. On 16 January 2024, he returned to Orient on a permanent basis, joining on a two-and-a-half-year deal for an undisclosed fee.

On 26 August 2025, Cooper left Orient to sign for League Two team Salford City, signing a two year deal with The Ammies.

== International career ==
Cooper received his first call-up to the Wales senior squad in March 2021 for the friendly match against Mexico and the World Cup qualifier against Czech Republic. He received a further call up in September for a World Cup qualifier against Estonia.

== Career statistics ==
As of match played on 13 September 2025

Appearances and goals by club, season and competition
Club	Season	League			FA Cup		EFL Cup		Other		Total	
Club	Season	Division	Apps	Goals	Apps	Goals	Apps	Goals	Apps	Goals	Apps	Goals
Swansea City	2018–19	Championship	0	0	0	0	1	0	—		1	0
Swansea City	2019–20	Championship	0	0	1	0	0	0	—		1	0
Swansea City	2020–21	Championship	1	0	0	0	0	0	—		1	0
Swansea City	2021–22	Championship	4	0	1	0	3	0	—		8	0
Swansea City	2022–23	Championship	0	0	0	0	0	0	—		0	0
Swansea City	2023–24	Championship	0	0	0	0	0	0	—		0	0
Swansea City	Total		5	0	2	0	4	0	—		11	0
Swansea City U23	2018–19	—			—		—		2 (Note: Appearance(s) in EFL Trophy)	0	2	0
Yeovil Town (loan)	2019–20	National League	3	0	—		—		0	0	3	0
Newport County (loan)	2020–21	League Two	19	1	2	0	3	0	1	0	25	1
Swindon Town (loan)	2021–22	League Two	8	0	—		—		0	0	8	0
Forest Green Rovers (loan)	2022–23	League One	21	0	1	0	—		—		22	0
Leyton Orient (loan)	2023–24	League One	14	0	2	0	0	0	1	0	17	0
Leyton Orient	2023–24	League One	15	0	—		—		—		15	0
Leyton Orient	2024–25	League One	30	0	3	0	3	2	5 (Note: Four appearances in EFL Trophy, one appearance in League One play-offs)	0	41	2
Leyton Orient	Total		45	0	3	0	3	2	5	0	56	2
Salford City	2025–26	League Two	2	0	0	0	0	0	1	0	3	0
Career total			117	1	10	0	10	2	10	0	147	3
