= Rhys Byrne =

English/Welsh footballer

Personal information
- Full name: Rhys John Howard Byrne
- Date of birth: 24 August 2002 (age 24)
- Place of birth: Redbridge, England
- Height: 1.89 m (6 ft 2 in)
- Position: Goalkeeper

Team information
- Current team: Hornchurch
- Number: 13

Youth career
- –2021: Leyton Orient

Senior career*
Years	Team	Apps	(Gls)
2021–2025	Leyton Orient	0	(0)
2022	→ Canvey Island (loan)	5	(0)
2024	→ Dartford (loan)	8	(0)
2024	→ Bowers & Pitsea (loan)	18	(0)
2025	→ Salisbury (loan)	22	(0)
2025–	Hornchurch	0	(0)
- * Club domestic league appearances and goals as of 11:43, 2 June 2025 (UTC)

Rhys John Howard Byrne (born 24 August 2002) is an English professional footballer who plays as a goalkeeper for National League club Hornchurch.

== Career ==
=== Leyton Orient ===
Byrne signed a professional contract with Leyton Orient in the summer of 2021, following a season of training with the first team. He made his senior debut for Orient in the EFL Trophy at home to Southampton U21 on 14 September 2021, and subsequently played in three more matches in the tournament before Orient were knocked out by MK Dons in a penalty shoot-out. He kept clean sheets in all four appearances.

In August 2022, Byrne joined Canvey Island on loan where he made five Isthmian League Premier Division appearances and one FA Cup appearance.

On 22 March 2024, Byrne joined Dartford on loan for the rest of the 2023–24 season.

In August 2024, Byrne joined Isthmian League Premier Division side Bowers & Pitsea on a three-month loan deal.

On 14 January 2025, Byrne joined National League South side Salisbury on an initial one-month loan deal.

On 2 June 2025, Orient said the player would be leaving when his contract expired.

=== Hornchurch ===
On 1 August 2025, Byrne joined National League South club Hornchurch.

== Career statistics ==
As of match played 7 December 2024

Appearances and goals by club, season and competition
Salisbury FC	2025	National League South			FA Cup		EFL Cup		Other		Total	
Salisbury FC	2025	Division	Apps	Goals	Apps	Goals	Apps	Goals	Apps	Goals	Apps	Goals
Leyton Orient	2021–22	League Two	0	0	0	0	0	0	4 (Note: Appearance(s) in EFL Trophy)	0	4	0
Leyton Orient	2022–23	League Two	0	0	0	0	0	0	0	0	0	0
Leyton Orient	2023–24	League One	0	0	0	0	0	0	0	0	0	0
Leyton Orient	2024–25	League One	0	0	0	0	0	0	0	0	0	0
Leyton Orient	Total		0	0	0	0	0	0	4	0	4	0
Canvey Island (loan)	2022–23	Isthmian League Premier Division	5	0	1	0	—		0	0	6	0
Dartford (loan)	2023–24	National League South	8	0	—		—		0	0	8	0
Bowers & Pitsea (loan)	2024–25	Isthmian League Premier Division	18	0	2	0	—		3 (Note: Appearance(s) in FA Trophy) (Note: Appearance(s) in Velocity Cup)	0	23	0
Career total			31	0	3	0	0	0	7	0	41	0

== Honours ==
Hornchurch

- National League South play-offs: 2026
