= Hornchurch F.C. =

Association football club in London, England

Hornchurch
- Full name: Hornchurch Football Club
- Nickname: The Urchins
- Founded: 1881
- Ground: Hornchurch Stadium, Upminster
- Chairman: Alex Sharp
- Manager: Daryl McMahon
- League: National League
- 2025–26: National League South, 2nd of 24 (promoted via play-offs)
- Website: hornchurchfc.com
Home colours	Away colours

Hornchurch Football Club is a professional football club based in Upminster, London, England. They are currently members of the National League and play at the Hornchurch Stadium.

== History ==
=== 1881 club ===
The first Hornchurch Football Club was founded in October 1881. Based at Grey Towers, they played a dozen matches in their first season. The club finished the season with a 7 shilling deficit, albeit thanks to a late half-guinea donation from Joseph Fry. The club was a founder member of the Essex Football Association in 1882, and entered the FA Cup in 1882–83. Drawn at home to Great Marlow in the first round, the visitors won 2–0, with their inexperience being shown up by not appealing for offside against the first goal until after kicking off again, preventing the referee from considering it.

By the end of the 1882–83 season, the club had 40 members, and enough players for a second team. However, for the club's second FA Cup entry, drawn again at home to Great Marlow in the first round, they only started with 10 players, with some of the better players not turning up. The visitors this time won 9–0, R.A. Lunnon scoring a double hat trick. By the start of the 1885–86 season, the club was bankrupt, with a debt of £22, and had been wound up; a new football club, Hornchurch Wanderers, was formed instead.

=== 1923 club ===
The next Hornchurch club was established in 1923 as Upminster Wanderers. They joined the Romford League, which they remained members of until moving up to Division Two East of the Spartan League in 1938, at which point the club adopted the name Upminster Football Club. After spending the 1945–46 season back in the Romford League, winning the league title and the Essex Junior Cup, the club returned to the lower divisions of the Spartan League the following season. The club were promoted to the Premier Division of the league in 1950–51, but left to join the Delphian League in 1952, at which point another name change (this time due to a move to the Hornchurch Stadium) saw them become Hornchurch & Upminster.

Hornchurch & Upminster were Delphian League runners-up in 1958–59, after which the club transferred to the Athenian League. In 1961 they were renamed Hornchurch Football Club. The Athenian League was expanded in 1963, with Hornchurch becoming members of the Premier Division. They were relegated to Division One after finishing bottom of the Premier Division in 1965–66, but won the Division One title the following season to make an immediate return to the Premier Division. The yo-yoing between divisions continued as they were relegated again in 1967–68, promoted from Division One after finishing third in 1970–71, and then relegated again at the end of the 1972–73 season.

In 1975 Hornchurch transferred to Division Two of the Isthmian League, which was renamed Division One in 1977. The club were relegated to Division Two at the end of the 1977–78 season saw them relegated to Division Two. In 1980–81 they were Division Two runners-up, earning promotion to Division One. League restructuring led to the club being placed in Division Two North for the 1986–87 season, before another reorganisation in 1991 saw them moved to Division Three. In 2001–02 the club were Division Three runners-up and were promoted to Division One.

Hornchurch went on to finish as runners-up in Division One North in 2002–03 and were promoted to the Premier Division. The 2003–04 season saw the club reach the first round of the FA Cup for the first time. After beating Third Division Darlington 2–0 in the first round, they lost 1–0 to Tranmere Rovers in the second. A fifth-place finish in the Premier Division that season (despite a 10-point deduction for going into administration) was also enough for the club to earn a place in the new Conference South. Their first season in the Conference South saw them reach the FA Cup first round again. However, shortly before the match the entire squad was released due to financial problems. With several debutants and youth players, the team lost the match against Boston United 5–2, and subsequently folded at the end of the 2004–05 season.

=== 2005 reformation ===
The club was quickly reformed under the name AFC Hornchurch, and were placed in the Essex Senior League (three levels below the Conference South) by the Football Association on 19 May. In their first season they won the league, as well as the League Cup and the Gordon Brasted Memorial Trophy. Promoted to Division One North of the Isthmian League, the club won that division in 2006–07 to earn promotion to the Premier Division. In 2007–08 AFC Hornchurch finished fourth in the Premier Division, qualifying for the promotion play-offs, in which they were beaten 3–1 by AFC Wimbledon in the semi-finals. The 2008–09 saw the club finish sixth, missing out on the play-offs. They also reached the first round of the FA Cup, losing 1–0 at home to Peterborough United. Although they entered administration in May 2009, the club managed to survive. After a ninth-placed finish in 2009–10 and coming tenth in 2010–11, they were runners-up in 2011–12, qualifying for the play-offs. Following a 3–1 win over Bury Town in the semi-finals, they defeated Lowestoft Town 2–1 in the final, earning promotion to the Conference South.

Their first season in the Conference South saw AFC Hornchurch finish 20th, resulting in relegation back to the Isthmian League Premier Division. The 2013–14 resulted in a fifth-placed finish and qualification for the promotion play-offs. In a repeat of the 2011 final, they faced Lowestoft Town following a 1–0 win over Kingstonian in the semi-finals. On this occasion, they lost 3–0 to the Suffolk club. The following season saw them finish 23rd out of 24 clubs in the Premier Division and relegation to Division One North. They finished fifth in 2015–16, again qualifying for the promotion play-offs. After beating Thurrock 2–0 in the semi-final, they were beaten 3–1 by Harlow Town. In 2016–17 a fourth-place finish led to another playoff campaign, with the club losing 1–0 to Thurrock in the semi-finals.

AFC Hornchurch were champions of the renamed North Division in 2017–18, earning promotion back to the Premier Division. At the end of the following season they were renamed Hornchurch Football Club. In 2020–21 the club won the FA Trophy for the first time, defeating Hereford 3–1 in the final, becoming the first seventh tier club to win the competition. They finished the league season in fourth place, going on to beat Enfield Town 3–2 in the play-off semi-finals before losing the final 3–2 to Cheshunt. The club were Premier Division runners-up the 2022–23, again entering the play-offs. After beating Cray Wanderers 4–2 on penalties after a 3–3 draw in the semi-finals, they lost 1–0 to Aveley in the final. The following season the club Premier Division champions, earning promotion to the National League South.

In 2025–26 Hornchurch were runners-up in the National League South. They went on to beat Weston-super-Mare 2–0 in the play-off semi-finals, before defeating Torquay United 3–2 (after extra time) in the final to earn promotion to the National League.

=== Season-by-season record ===
Season	League	Tier	Pld	W	D	L	GF	GA	GD	Pts	Position	FA Cup	FA Trophy
2005–06	Essex Senior League	9	30	25	3	2	71	21	+50	78	1/16	2Q	–
2006–07	Isthmian League Division One North	8	42	32	7	3	96	27	+69	103	1/22	3Q r	2Q
2007–08	Isthmian League Premier Division	7	42	20	10	12	68	44	+24	70	4/22	4Q	2Q r
2008–09	Isthmian League Premier Division	7	42	19	8	15	60	51	+9	65	6/22	1R	1Q r
2009–10	Isthmian League Premier Division	7	42	16	13	13	51	47	+4	61	9/22	1Q	3Q r
2010–11	Isthmian League Premier Division	7	42	19	12	11	60	46	+14	69	10/22	2Q r	1R
2011–12	Isthmian League Premier Division	7	42	26	4	12	68	35	+33	82	2/22	1Q	2R
2012–13	Conference South	6	42	11	11	20	47	64	–17	44	20/22	2Q	3Q
2013–14	Isthmian League Premier Division	7	46	24	11	11	83	53	+30	83	5/24	4Q	1Q
2014–15	Isthmian League Premier Division	7	46	10	10	26	46	70	–24	40	23/24	1Q r	3Q
2015–16	Isthmian League Division One North	8	46	25	11	10	87	35	+52	86	5/24	4Q	1Q
2016–17	Isthmian League Division One North	8	46	24	13	9	78	42	+36	85	4/24	1Q	P
2017–18	Isthmian League North Division	8	46	32	7	7	97	35	+62	103	1/24	3Q	P r
2018–19	Isthmian League Premier Division	7	42	12	14	16	57	59	–2	50	15/22	3Q	2Q
2019–20 (Note: Due to the coronavirus pandemic, the season was ended in March.)	Isthmian League Premier Division	7	33	17	11	5	62	28	+34	62	3/22	2Q	2R
2020–21 (Note: Due to the lockdowns from the coronavirus pandemic, clubs were unable to complete fixtures and the season was curtailed in February.)	Isthmian League Premier Division	7	10	4	2	4	17	12	+5	14	8/22	3Q	W
2021–22	Isthmian League Premier Division	7	42	25	6	11	89	42	+47	81	4/22	3Q	3Q
2022–23	Isthmian League Premier Division	7	42	25	9	8	98	49	+49	84	2/22	4Q	3Q
2023–24	Isthmian League Premier Division	7	42	31	7	4	95	34	+61	100	1/22	3Q	3Q
2024–25	National League South	6	46	17	14	15	59	54	+5	65	9/24	3Q	2R
2025–26	National League South	6	46	23	12	11	81	64	+17	81	2/24	2Q	4R

== Squad ==
=== Current squad ===
As of 7 November 2026

Note: Flags indicate national team as defined under FIFA eligibility rules; some limited exceptions apply. Players may hold more than one non-FIFA nationality.

No.	Pos.	Nation	Player
1	GK	ENG	Arthur Nasta
2	DF	ENG	Will Greenidge
3	DF	ENG	Ryan Inniss
4	MF	ENG	Jack Powell
5	DF	ENG	Jack Baldwin
6	DF	ENG	Tom Dallison
7	FW	ENG	Josh Walker
8	MF	ENG	Tom Wraight
9	FW	ENG	Henry Hearn
10	MF	COL	Ángelo Balanta
11	FW	ENG	Henry Sandat
12	DF	ENG	Joe Kizzi
13	GK	ENG	Rhys Byrne
14	MF	ENG	Charlie Pegrum

No.	Pos.	Nation	Player
15	MF	GUY	Nathan Ferguson
18	MF	ANT	Myles Weston
19	DF	ENG	Sam Ling
20	MF	JAM	Makai Welch
21	FW	LCA	Dominic Poleon
22	DF	ENG	Frankie Edwards
23	DF	ENG	Frankie Moralee
25	MF	ENG	Miles Bracking (on loan from Norwich City)
26	MF	ENG	Aaron Rowe
27	MF	ENG	Alfie Massey (on loan from Millwall)
28	DF	ENG	Theodore Adelusi (on loan from Norwich City)
29	MF	TAN	Mohammed Sagaf
30	FW	ENG	Ryan Loft (on loan from Cambridge United)
31	DF	ENG	Harry Taylor (on loan from Southend United)

=== Out on loan ===
Note: Flags indicate national team as defined under FIFA eligibility rules; some limited exceptions apply. Players may hold more than one non-FIFA nationality.

No.	Pos.	Nation	Player
17	MF	ENG	Asher Yearwood (at Havant & Waterlooville until end of 2026-27 season)
24	FW	ENG	Bobby Kelman (at Folkestone Invicta until 1 January 2027)

== Honours ==
- FA Trophy
  - Winners 2020–21
- Isthmian League
  - Premier Division champions 2023–24
  - Division One North champions 2006–07, 2017–18
- Athenian League
  - Division One champions 1966–67
- Essex Senior League
  - Champions 2005–06
  - League Cup winners 2005–06
  - Gordon Brasted Memorial Trophy winners 2005–06
- Romford League
  - Champions 1945–46
- Essex Junior Cup
  - Winners 1945–46

== Records ==
- Best FA Cup performance: Second round, 2003–04
- Best FA Trophy performance: Winners, 2020–21
- Best FA Vase performance: Fifth round,1974–75

== See also ==
- Hornchurch F.C. players
- Hornchurch F.C. managers
