= Theo Archibald =

Scottish footballer

Personal information
- Full name: Theodore Valentine Archibald
- Date of birth: 5 March 1998 (age 28)
- Place of birth: Glasgow, Scotland
- Height: 1.80 m (5 ft 11 in)
- Position: Right winger

Team information
- Current team: Leyton Orient
- Number: 44

Youth career
- –2015: Celtic

Senior career*
Years	Team	Apps	(Gls)
2015–2017	Celtic	0	(0)
2017	→ Albion Rovers (loan)	14	(0)
2017–2019	Brentford	2	(0)
2018–2019	→ Forest Green Rovers (loan)	14	(1)
2019–2020	Macclesfield Town	28	(4)
2020–2022	Lincoln City	7	(0)
2021–2022	→ Leyton Orient (loan)	38	(8)
2022–	Leyton Orient	93	(9)

International career
2013–2014	Scotland U16	5	(0)
2017	Scotland U19	2	(0)
2017	Scotland U21	1	(0)
- * Club domestic league appearances and goals as of 05:45, 11 October 2026 (UTC)

Theodore Valentine Archibald (born 5 March 1998) is a Scottish professional footballer who plays as a right winger for EFL League One club Leyton Orient.

Archibald is a product of the Celtic academy. Following two seasons with Brentford B, he began his senior career in earnest with Macclesfield Town in 2019. He subsequently played for Lincoln City, before transferring to Leyton Orient in 2022. Archibald was capped by Scotland at youth level.

== Club career ==
=== Celtic ===
A right winger, Archibald began his career in the academy at hometown club Celtic at a young age. He won the 2014–15 Glasgow Cup with the U17 team and signed a three-year professional contract. Archibald progressed through the youth ranks to be called into the U20 squad for three Scottish Challenge Cup matches early in the 2016–17 season and made his only appearance as a late substitute for Regan Hendry during a 5–1 first round victory over Annan Athletic on 2 August 2017. Archibald made appearances for the U19 team in the UEFA Youth League during the 2015–16 and 2016–17 seasons and helped the Development Squad to win the 2015–16 SPFL Development League title. Following a development loan at Scottish League One club Albion Rovers during the second half of the 2016–17 season, Archibald departed Celtic Park on 9 June 2017, after his contract expired.

=== Brentford ===
On 12 May 2017, Archibald moved to England to sign a three-year B team contract with Championship club Brentford on a free transfer, effective 9 June 2017. He made three appearances early in the 2017–18 season, but drifted out of favour in late September 2017. He finished the season as the B team's second-leading scorer, with 14 goals.

Archibald joined League Two club Forest Green Rovers on loan for the duration of the 2018–19 season. He scored the first senior goal of his career on his 21st appearance, with a "stunning" 25-yard injury time strike to seal a 2–1 victory over Northampton Town on New Year's Day 2019. A lack of game time led to Archibald's recall to Brentford after the match. He had gained experience as a wing back while away on loan and was deployed in that position for the B team during the second half of the 2018–19 season. Archibald contributed to the B team's 2019 Middlesex Senior Cup Final victory and was an unused substitute during the first team's final match of the season. After a difficult two seasons off the field at Griffin Park, he was released on a free transfer in July 2019.

=== Macclesfield Town ===
On 30 July 2019, Archibald signed a one-year contract League Two club Macclesfield Town on a free transfer, with the option of a further year. He made 33 appearances and scored six goals before his contract was cancelled on 13 May 2020.

=== Lincoln City ===
On 24 August 2020, Archibald signed a one-year contract with League One club Lincoln City. During a 2020–21 season affected by injury and COVID-19, he made 12 appearances, scored one goal and did not feature during the Imps' unsuccessful 2021 play-off campaign. Archibald was retained for the 2021–22 season, but, with director of football Jez George unable to offer him regular football, he departed on a season-long loan in July 2021. Archibald transferred away from Sincil Bank in June 2022, though the club retained "a future interest in the player".

=== Leyton Orient ===
On 29 July 2021, Archibald joined League Two club Leyton Orient on loan for the duration of the 2021–22 season. He made a career-high 42 appearances and scored eight goals during a mid-table season. On 8 June 2022, Archibald signed a two-year contract for an undisclosed fee. He made 39 appearances and scored five goals during the 2022–23 League Two title-winning season. Archibald was again a regular during the 2023–24 season, prior to undergoing surgery on a season-ending anterior cruciate ligament injury suffered in a match versus Port Vale on 6 February 2024. He signed a new one-year contract in July 2024, but suffered an injury setback in mid-November 2024, which required further surgery. In Archibald's absence, the club fell to defeat in the 2025 League One playoff final. Though his contract lapsed after the end of the 2024–25 season, Archibald remained with the club in order to complete his rehabilitation.

After having "been back in full training for a couple of weeks" by mid-November 2025, Archibald signed a contract running until the end of the 2025–26 season. He made his first appearance for 662 days as a substitute late in a 4–0 win over Burton Albion on 29 November 2025. Archibald captained the club for the first time in a 3–1 victory over Reading on 17 January 2026. He made 24 appearances and scored two goals during the remainder of the 2025–26 season, in which the club narrowly avoided relegation. Archibald's 24 appearances triggered an appearance-based option on his contract for the 2026–27 season.

== International career ==
Archibald was called up to a Scotland U14 training camp in 2012 and was capped at U16, U19 and U21 level. He was a member of the U16 squad which won the 2013–14 Victory Shield. Archibald won his only U21 cap as a late substitute for Oliver Burke in Scotland's 2–1 2019 UEFA European U21 Championship qualifying win over the Netherlands on 5 September 2017.

== Style of play ==
Brentford Head of Football Operations Robert Rowan described Archibald as "an inverted right winger, he's powerful, quick, direct and intelligent in possession". Of his preferred position, Archibald stated "I like either wing. I've played numerous positions. I've played left back, number 10, but ideally I like playing on the wing".

== Personal life ==
Archibald attended High School of Glasgow. His cousins Katie and John are professional racing cyclists.

== Career statistics ==
As of match played 8 August 2026

Appearances and goals by club, season and competition
Club	Season	League			National cup (Note: Includes FA Cup)		League cup (Note: Includes EFL Cup)		Other		Total	
Club	Season	Division	Apps	Goals	Apps	Goals	Apps	Goals	Apps	Goals	Apps	Goals
Celtic U20	2016–17	—							1 (Note: Appearance in Scottish Challenge Cup)	0	1	0
Albion Rovers (loan)	2016–17	Scottish League One	14	0	—		—		—		14	0
Brentford	2017–18	Championship	2	0	0	0	1	0	—		3	0
Brentford	2018–19	Championship	0	0	0	0	0	0	—		0	0
Brentford	Total		2	0	0	0	1	0	—		3	0
Forest Green Rovers (loan)	2018–19	League Two	14	1	2	0	2	0	3 (Note: Appearance(s) in EFL Trophy)	0	21	1
Macclesfield Town	2019–20	League Two	28	4	0	0	2	0	3	2	33	6
Lincoln City	2020–21	League One	7	0	2	0	1	0	2	1	12	1
Leyton Orient (loan)	2021–22	League Two	38	8	2	0	1	0	1	0	42	8
Leyton Orient	2022–23	League Two	35	5	1	0	1	0	2	0	39	5
Leyton Orient	2023–24	League One	30	2	2	0	1	0	3	0	36	2
Leyton Orient	2025–26	League One	23	2	0	0	0	0	1	0	24	2
Leyton Orient	2026–27	League One	0	0	0	0	1	0	0	0	1	0
Leyton Orient	Total		126	17	5	0	4	0	7	0	142	17
Career total			191	22	9	0	9	0	16	3	226	25

== Honours ==
Brentford B

- Middlesex Senior Cup: 2018–19

Scotland U16

- Victory Shield: 2013–14

Leyton Orient

- EFL League Two: 2022–23
