= Sam Howes =

English footballer (born 1997)

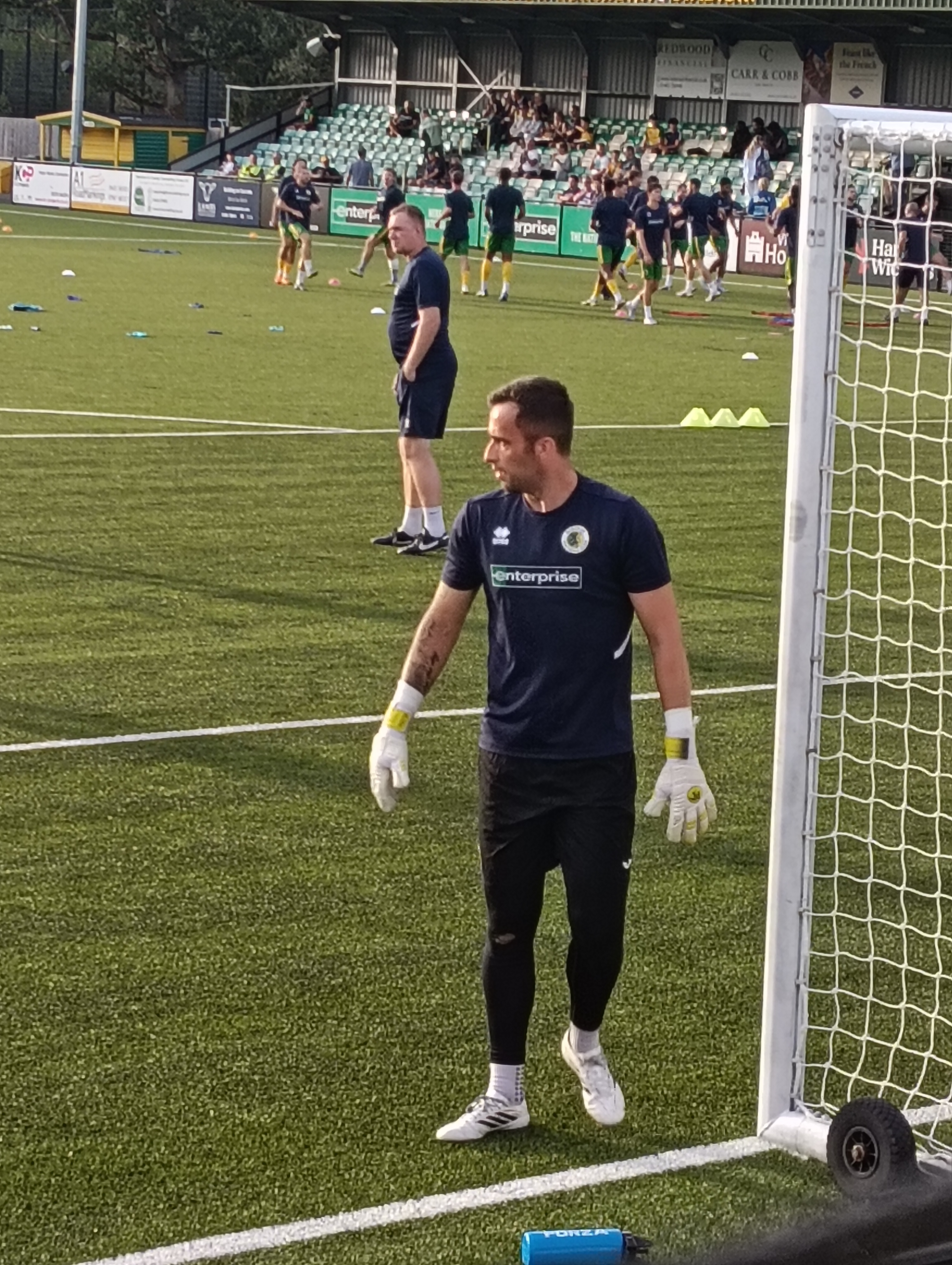
- Sam Howes warming up for Horsham 2026

Personal information
- Full name: Samuel Scott Howes
- Date of birth: 10 November 1997 (age 29)
- Place of birth: Bexley, England
- Height: 1.90 m (6 ft 3 in)
- Position: Goalkeeper

Team information
- Current team: Horsham

Youth career
- Crystal Palace
- West Ham United

Senior career*
Years	Team	Apps	(Gls)
2014–2017	West Ham United	0	(0)
2015–2016	→ Wealdstone (loan)	5	(0)
2017	→ Hampton & Richmond Borough (loan)	20	(0)
2017–2019	Watford	0	(0)
2017–2018	→ Hampton & Richmond Borough (loan)	23	(0)
2019	→ Eastbourne Borough (loan)	14	(0)
2019–2020	Woking	2	(0)
2019	→ Chelmsford City (loan)	2	(0)
2020	→ Dorking Wanderers (loan)	2	(0)
2020–2021	Dorking Wanderers	6	(0)
2021–2022	Horsham	43	(0)
2022	→ Wealdstone (loan)	2	(0)
2022–2023	Wealdstone	46	(0)
2023–2025	Leyton Orient	4	(0)
2024	→ Wealdstone (loan)	8	(0)
2025	→ Maidenhead United (loan)	6	(0)
2025–2026	Dagenham & Redbridge	36	(0)
2026–	Horsham	13	(0)

International career
2013	England U16	2	(0)
2014	England U17	3	(0)
2014–2015	England U18	3	(0)
2015–2016	England U19	3	(0)
2023	England C	1	(0)
- * Club domestic league appearances and goals as of 07:57, 10 November 2026 (UTC)

Samuel Scott Howes (born 10 November 1997) is an English professional footballer who plays as a goalkeeper for National League South club Horsham.

== Club career ==
Howes began his career at Crystal Palace, playing for the club's academy for two years, before moving to West Ham United at the age of ten. In 2014, Howes won West Ham's Young Hammer of the Year award, as well as signing his first professional contract in November of that year. During Howes' time at West Ham, he made an appearance for West Ham's first team against Sydney FC, in July 2014, in the club's pre-season tour of New Zealand and featured once on the bench, in an FA Cup tie against Liverpool in January 2016. During his time at West Ham, Howes was loaned out to National League South sides Wealdstone and Hampton & Richmond Borough.

In July 2017, Howes signed for Watford. Shortly after his move to Watford, Howes returned to Hampton & Richmond on loan. Howes made 20 league appearances for Hampton, before a further loan spell followed at Eastbourne Borough in January 2019, where Howes made 14 league appearances.

In July 2019, upon the expiry of his contract at Watford, Howes signed for Woking. In November 2019, after failing to break into the starting XI at Woking, Howes signed for Chelmsford City on a one-month loan deal. In March 2020, following two league appearances for Woking, Howes joined Dorking Wanderers on loan.

Ahead of the 2020–21 season, Howes joined Dorking permanently. Howes made eight appearances for Dorking in all competitions during the season.

During the summer of 2021, Howes signed for Isthmian League club Horsham. During the season, Howes made 58 appearances for Horsham in all competitions, as the club won the Alan Turvey Trophy. On 30 April 2022, Howes signed for Wealdstone on an emergency loan deal.

On 21 June 2022, Howes signed for Wealdstone on a permanent deal, marking his third spell at the club. Howes was an ever present for Wealdstone during the 2022–23 National League season, making 46 appearances.

On 6 July 2023, Howes signed for Leyton Orient on a two-year contract. On 8 August 2023, Howes made his debut for Leyton Orient, starting in a 2–0 EFL Cup loss against Plymouth Argyle.

On 17 September 2024, Howes re-joined Wealdstone for the fourth time, signing on a two month loan as cover for the injured Archie Matthews. He returned to his parent club in November 2024.

In April 2025, Howes joined Maidenhead United on an emergency loan until the end of the season.

On 2 June 2025, Orient said the player would be leaving when his contract expired.

In June 2025, Howes agreed to join Dagenham & Redbridge on a two-year deal following their relegation to the National League South. He departed the club by mutual consent in June 2026.

On 16 June 2026, the same day as his departure from Dagenham & Redbridge, he returned to former club Horsham, now of the National League South.

== International career ==
Howes has represented England at under-16, under-17, under-18 and under-19 level. In 2014, Howes was part of the England squad, making one appearance, that won the 2014 UEFA European Under-17 Championship.

In March 2023, Howes was called up to the England C squad.

== Honours ==
England U17

- UEFA European Under-17 Championship: 2014

Horsham

- Alan Turvey Trophy: 2021–22

Individual

- West Ham United Young Player of the Year: 2013–14
