= 2022–23 Leyton Orient F.C. season =

Leyton Orient FC
2022–23 season
- Chairman: Nigel Travis
- Head coach: Richie Wellens
- Stadium: Brisbane Road
- League Two: 1st (promoted)
- FA Cup: First round
- EFL Cup: First round
- EFL Trophy: Group stage
- Top goalscorer: League: Paul Smyth (10); All: Paul Smyth (10)
Home colours	Away colours	Third colours
- All statistics correct as of 9 May 2023.

The 2022–23 season is the 124th season in the existence of Leyton Orient Football Club and the club's fourth consecutive season in League Two. In addition to the league, they will also compete in the 2022–23 FA Cup, the 2022–23 EFL Cup and the 2022–23 EFL Trophy.

== Transfers ==
=== In ===
Date	Pos	Player	Transferred from	Fee	Ref
10 June 2022 (Note: The transfer was announced on 8 June, and would become official on June 10 once the transfer window opened)	LM	(Scotland) Theo Archibald	(England) Lincoln City	Undisclosed	
29 June 2022	CM	(England) George Moncur	(England) Hull City	Undisclosed	
30 June 2022	LM	(Cyprus) Anthony Georgiou	(Cyprus) AEL Limassol	Free Transfer	
27 July 2022	RB	(England) Rob Hunt	(England) Swindon Town	Free Transfer	
10 January 2023	DF	(England) Ethan Light	(England) Burnham	Undisclosed	
20 January 2023	DM	(Australia) Jordan Lyden	Unattached	—N/a	

=== Out ===
Date	Pos	Player	Transferred to	Fee	Ref
22 June 2022	DM	(Cyprus) Hector Kyprianou	(England) Peterborough United	Undisclosed	
30 June 2022	CM	(England) Antony Papadopoulos	(England) Welling United	Released	
30 June 2022	CM	(Republic of Ireland) Callum Reilly	(England) Banbury United	Released	
1 July 2022	RM	(Pakistan) Otis Khan	(England) Grimsby Town	Undisclosed	
19 January 2023	DM	(England) Ethan Coleman	(England) Gillingham	Undisclosed	

=== Loans in ===
Date	Pos	Player	Loaned from	On loan until	Ref
25 July 2022	CF	(United States) Charlie Kelman	(England) Queens Park Rangers	End of Season	
12 August 2022	CM	(Tunisia) Idris El Mizouni	(England) Ipswich Town	End of Season	
1 September 2022	RM	(Guyana) Stephen Duke-McKenna	(England) Queens Park Rangers	End of Season	
1 September 2022	CF	(England) Jayden Wareham	(England) Chelsea	11 January 2023 (Note: On 11 January, Wareham was recalled back to Chelsea)	
13 January 2023	CB	(Wales) Ed Turns	(England) Brighton & Hove Albion	End of Season	
17 January 2023	CB	(Scotland) Jamie McCart	(England) Rotherham United	End of Season	
27 January 2023	LW	(Republic of Ireland) Kieran Sadlier	(England) Bolton Wanderers	End of Season	

=== Loans out ===
Date	Pos	Player	Loaned to	On loan until	Ref
30 June 2022	CM	(England) Matt Young	(England) Wealdstone	3 October 2022 (Note: On 3 October, Young joined Haringey Borough after his loan at Wealdstone was concluded early.)	
4 August 2022	DM	(England) Ethan Coleman	(England) Bromley	19 January 2023 (Note: On 19 January, Coleman was recalled back from his loan at Bromley and was sold to Gillingham)	
5 August 2022	LB	(England) Harrison Sodje	(England) Heybridge Swifts	5 September 2022	
13 August 2022	GK	(England) Rhys Byrne	(England) Canvey Island	13 September 2022	
13 August 2022	CF	(Wales) Sonny Fish	(England) Bowers & Pitsea	13 September 2022	
19 August 2022	MF	(England) Jephte Tanga	(England) Royston Town	16 September 2022	
1 September 2022	CF	(England) Harry Smith	(England) Exeter City	22 October 2022	
3 October 2022	MF	(England) Jephte Tanga	(England) Sutton Common Rovers	3 December 2022	
3 October 2022	CM	(England) Matt Young	(England) Haringey Borough	3 January 2023	
20 October 2022	LB	(England) Harrison Sodje	(England) Cray Wanderers	31 January 2023 (Note: On 29 November, Sodje's loan at Cray was extended.)	
7 November 2022	LM	(Cyprus) Anthony Georgiou	(England) Yeovil Town	7 December 2022	
29 November 2022	MF	(England) Jephte Tanga	(England) Cray Wanderers	1 January 2023	
7 December 2022	CF	(England) Daniel Nkrumah	(England) Welling United	14 January 2023 (Note: On 9 January, Nkrumah's loan at Welling was extended until the end of the season, However five days later he was recalled due to injuries in the squad)	
1 January 2023	LB	(England) Connor Wood	(England) Colchester United	End of Season	
7 February 2023	CF	(England) Harry Smith	(England) Barnet	End of Season	
11 February 2023	MF	(England) Ethan Light	(England) Kings Langley	11 March 2023	
11 February 2023	MF	(Kenya) Zech Obiero	(England) Cheshunt	11 March 2023	
23 March 2023	CF	(England) Daniel Nkrumah	(England) Welling United	End of Season	

== Pre-season and friendlies ==
The O's announced, on 10 May, that they would head to Moncarapacho in Portugal for a week-long training camp between 2 and 9 July. Walthamstow revealed a match with Leyton Orient on 19 May. A day later, lower-league Potters Bar Town announced a home pre-season match with The O's. On 24 May, Orient confirmed their pre-season schedule with additional friendlies against Haringey Borough, Maidstone United, Portsmouth and Dagenham & Redbridge. On June 17, Orient announced their pre-season training would include a behind closed doors meeting with West Bromwich Albion. Three days later, a home friendly against Tottenham Hotspur U21s was added to the pre-season schedule. Another training camp friendly in Portugal was confirmed, against Peterborough United.

On 5 January, Orient announced they would travel to Welling United for a mid-season friendly, to gain extra match minutes. On 10 January, the friendly was cancelled due to unforeseen circumstances.

1 July 2022 Friendly	Haringey Borough	1–2	Leyton Orient	Tottenham
19:00 BST	Mendy 75' (pen.)	Report	Georgiou 5'; Nkrumah 55' (pen.)	Stadium: Coles Park

4 July 2022 Friendly	Leyton Orient	1–2	West Bromwich Albion	TBA, Portugal
18:30 WEST	Moncur (penalty missed) 3'; Georgiou 79'	Report	Townsend 7'; Ashworth 51'	Stadium: TBA; Attendance: 0 (behind closed doors)

8 July 2022 Friendly	Leyton Orient	0–3	Peterborough United	Lagos, Portugal
11:00 WEST	Sargeant (yellow card) 81'	Report	Jones 37'; Randall 72'; Marriott 81'	Stadium: Municipal de Lagos; Attendance: 50 (approx)

12 July 2022 Friendly	Maidstone United	0–0	Leyton Orient	Maidstone
19:45 BST		Report		Stadium: Gallagher Stadium

16 July 2022 Friendly	Leyton Orient	3–1	Tottenham Hotspur U21s	Leyton
13:00 BST	Sotiriou 27'; Moncur 41'; Thompson 76'	Report	Etete 13'	Stadium: Brisbane Road

19 July 2022 Friendly	Leyton Orient	2–5	Portsmouth	Leyton
19:00 BST	Smyth 44'; Happe 72'	Report	Ogie 16' (o.g.); Pigott 18', 73'; Pack 51'; Curtis 55' (pen.)	Stadium: Breyer Group Stadium

23 July 2022 Friendly	Dagenham & Redbridge	2–2	Leyton Orient	Dagenham
19:45 BST	Morias 68'; Hare 82'	Report	Thompson 19'; Trialist 90+1'	Stadium: Victoria Road

26 July 2022 Friendly	Walthamstow	0–3	Leyton Orient XI	Walthamstow
19:45 BST		Report	Fish (?); Tanga (?); Georgiou (?)	Stadium: Wadham Lodge

24 August 2022 Friendly	Leyton Orient	4–1	Charlton Athletic U23s	Chigwell
13:00 BST	7' (o.g.); Georgiou (?); Obiero (?); Smith (?)	Report	(?)	Stadium: Chigwell Training Ground; Attendance: 0 (Behind-Closed-Doors)

== Competitions ==
=== Overall record ===
Competition	First match	Last match	Starting round	Record							
Competition	First match	Last match	Starting round	Pld	W	D	L	GF	GA	GD	Win %
League Two	August 2022	May 2023	Matchday 1	0	0	0	0	0	0	+0	—
FA Cup	TBC	TBC	First round	0	0	0	0	0	0	+0	—
EFL Cup	TBC	TBC	First round	0	0	0	0	0	0	+0	—
EFL Trophy	TBC	TBC	Group stage	0	0	0	0	0	0	+0	—
Total				0	0	0	0	0	0	+0	—

Last updated: pre-season
Source: [ Soccerway]

=== League Two ===
==== League table ====
Pos	Team	Pld	W	D	L	GF	GA	GD	Pts	Promotion, qualification or relegation
1	Leyton Orient (C, P)	46	26	13	7	61	34	+27	91	Promotion to EFL League One
2	Stevenage (P)	46	24	13	9	61	39	+22	85	Promotion to EFL League One
3	Northampton Town (P)	46	23	14	9	62	42	+20	83	Promotion to EFL League One
4	Stockport County	46	22	13	11	65	37	+28	79	Qualification for League Two play-offs
5	Carlisle United (O, P)	46	20	16	10	66	43	+23	76	Qualification for League Two play-offs
6	Bradford City	46	20	16	10	61	43	+18	76	Qualification for League Two play-offs

Source: EFL Official Website
Rules for classification: 1) Points; 2) Goal difference; 3) Number of goals scored; 4) Head-to-head results; 5) Wins; 6) Away goals; 7) Penalty points (sec 9.5); 8) 12-point sending off offences
(C) Champions; (O) Play-off winners; (P) Promoted

==== Results summary ====
Overall								Home						Away					
Pld	W	D	L	GF	GA	GD	Pts	W	D	L	GF	GA	GD	W	D	L	GF	GA	GD
46	26	13	7	61	34	+27	91	15	6	2	32	13	+19	11	7	5	29	21	+8

Last updated: 8 May 2023.
Source: [ Soccerway]

==== Results by round ====
Round	1	2	3	4	5	6	7	8	9	10	11	12	13	14	15	16	17	18	19	20	21	22	23	24	25	26	27	28	29	30	31	32	33	34	35	36	37	38	39	40	41	42	43	44	45	46
Ground	H	A	H	A	A	H	H	A	H	A	H	A	H	A	H	H	A	A	A	H	H	H	A	A	H	H	A	A	H	A	A	H	H	A	H	H	A	H	A	H	A	A	H	A	H	A
Result	W	W	W	D	W	W	W	W	W	W	L	D	D	W	W	W	L	W	W	W	W	D	D	L	W	D	L	L	W	W	D	W	W	D	D	D	D	W	W	D	W	L	W	W	L	D
Position	4	3	1	2	1	1	1	1	1	1	1	2	2	1	1	1	1	1	1	1	1	1	1	1	1	1	1	1	1	1	1	1	1	1	1	1	1	1	1	1	1	1	1	1	1	1

Updated to match(es) played on 8 May 2023. Source: [ Soccerway]
A = Away; H = Home; W = Win; D = Draw; L = Loss; P = Postponed

==== Matches ====
Win Draw Loss Fixtures

On 23 June, the league fixtures were announced.

30 July 2022 1	Leyton Orient	2–0	Grimsby Town	Leyton
15:00 BST	James (yellow card) 45+1', (goal) 56'; Hunt (yellow card) 45+4'; Moncur 49' (pen.); Beckles (yellow card) 87'	Report	Taylor (yellow card) 76'; McAtee (yellow card) 90'	Stadium: Breyer Group Stadium; Attendance: 8,557; Referee: Christopher Pollard

6 August 2022 2	Crawley Town	0–1	Leyton Orient	Crawley
15:00 BST		Report	James 50'	Stadium: The People's Pension Stadium; Attendance: 3,851; Referee: Sam Purkiss

13 August 2022 3	Leyton Orient	1–0	Mansfield Town	Leyton
15:00 BST	Hunt (yellow card) 27'; Kelman 63'; El Mizouni (yellow card) 66'; Brown (yellow card) 78'; Archibald (yellow card) 90+5'	Report	McLaughlin (penalty missed) 2', (yellow card) 90+3'; O'Toole (yellow card) 23'	Stadium: Breyer Group Stadium; Attendance: 6,328; Referee: Leigh Doughty

16 August 2022 4	Swindon Town	1–1	Leyton Orient	Swindon
19:45 BST	McKirdy 4'; Wakeling (yellow card) 74'	Report	Smyth 7'; El Mizouni (yellow card) 71'; James (yellow card) 88'	Stadium: The County Ground; Attendance: 8,524; Referee: Robert Lewis

20 August 2022 5	Colchester United	1–3	Leyton Orient	Colchester
15:00 BST	Chilvers 90+6'	Report	Chambers 16' (o.g.); James (yellow card) 70'; Thompson (yellow card) 72'; Archibald (yellow card) 76', (goal) 77'; Kelman 90'	Stadium: JobServe Community Stadium; Attendance: 4,340; Referee: Thomas Kirk

27 August 2022 6	Leyton Orient	4–2	Hartlepool United	Leyton
15:00 BST	Moncur 4' (pen.); Kelman 38', (yellow card) 90'; Smyth (yellow card) 40', (goal) 48'; Sotiriou 74'; Hunt (yellow card) 79'	Report	Murray (yellow card) 3'; McDonald 32'; Umerah (yellow card) 45+1', (goal) 69' (pen.); Crawford (yellow card) 73'	Stadium: Breyer Group Stadium; Attendance: 6,634; Referee: Declan Bourne

3 September 2022 7	Leyton Orient	2–0	Tranmere Rovers	Leyton
15:00 BST	Dacres-Cogley 36' (o.g.); Kelman (yellow card) 42'; Smyth (yellow card) 47', (goal) 85'; Beckles (yellow card) 90+3'	Report	Byrne (yellow card) 80'	Stadium: Breyer Group Stadium; Attendance: 6,578; Referee: David Webb

13 September 2022 8	Rochdale	0–1	Leyton Orient	Rochdale
19:45 BST	Quigley (yellow card) 34', (penalty missed) 90+5'; Odoh (yellow card) 68'	Report	Moncur 35'; Pratley (yellow card) 50'; El Mizouni (yellow card) 75'; Archibald (yellow card) 88'	Stadium: Spotland; Attendance: 2,173; Referee: Simon Mather

17 September 2022 9	Leyton Orient	1–0	Walsall	Leyton
15:00 BST	Beckles 58'; James (yellow card) 81'	Report	Comley (yellow card) 26'	Stadium: Breyer Group Stadium; Attendance: 6,736; Referee: Andy Davies

24 September 2022 10	Barrow	0–2	Leyton Orient	Barrow-in-Furness
15:00 BST	Kay (yellow card) 87' (yellow-red card) 87'	Report	Pratley (yellow card) 30'; Smyth 36'; El Mizouni 75'; Happe (yellow card) 82'; Archibald (yellow card) 86'; Brown (yellow card) 90+8'	Stadium: Furness Building Society Stadium; Attendance: 4,629; Referee: Martin Coy

1 October 2022 11	Leyton Orient	1–2	Newport County	Leyton
15:00 BST	Drinan 64'; Happe (yellow card) 66'	Report	Evans 22'; Bogle 26' (pen.)	Stadium: Breyer Group Stadium; Attendance: 7,403; Referee: Dean Whitestone

8 October 2022 12	Doncaster Rovers	1–1	Leyton Orient	Doncaster
15:00 BST	Biggins 76'; Faulkner (yellow card) 90+1'	Report	Pratley (yellow card) 22'; Smyth 26'	Stadium: Eco-Power Stadium; Attendance: 6,314; Referee: Martin Woods

15 October 2022 13	Leyton Orient	0–0	Northampton Town	Leyton
15:00 BST		Report	Leonard (yellow card) 40'; Fox (red card) 48'; Pinnock (yellow card) 70'; Odimayo (yellow card) 90+2'	Stadium: Breyer Group Stadium; Attendance: 8,716; Referee: Ollie Yates

22 October 2022 14	Carlisle United	2–3	Leyton Orient	Carlisle
15:00 BST	Edmondson 15' (red card) 36'; Gibson 56' (yellow card) 70'; Mellish (yellow card) 70'; Huntington (yellow card) 72'; Harris (yellow card) 90+3'	Report	Archibald 2', 17'; Hunt (yellow card) 8'; Drinan 50' (yellow card) 70'; Vigouroux (yellow card) 90+4'	Stadium: Brunton Park; Attendance: 5,519; Referee: Thomas Parsons

25 October 2022 15	Leyton Orient	2–0	Gillingham	Leyton
19:45 BST	Smyth 52'; Brown (yellow card) 55'; Happe (yellow card) 72'; Sotiriou 73'	Report	Jefferies (yellow card) 81'	Stadium: Breyer Group Stadium; Attendance: 7,099; Referee: Charles Breakspear

29 October 2022 16	Leyton Orient	1–0	Salford City	Leyton
15:00 BST	Smyth 14' (yellow card) 90+1'	Report	Lund (yellow card) 26'; Touray (yellow card) 36'; Bailey (yellow card) 90+1'	Stadium: Breyer Group Stadium; Attendance: 7,676; Referee: Will Finnie

8 November 2022 17	AFC Wimbledon	2–0	Leyton Orient	Wimbledon
19:45 GMT	Assal 19' (yellow card) 72'; Towler (yellow card) 32'; Pell 35'; Maghoma (yellow card) 44'; Marsh (yellow card) 73'	Report	James (yellow card) 20'; Drinan (yellow card) 41'; Smyth (yellow card) 45+3'; Beckles (yellow card) 90+1'; Moncur (yellow card) 90+9'	Stadium: The Cherry Red Records Stadium; Attendance: 7,994; Referee: Robert Lewis

12 November 2022 18	Harrogate Town	0–2	Leyton Orient	Harrogate
15:00 GMT	Headley (yellow card) 46'; Austerfield (yellow card) 86'	Report	Smyth 7'; Moncur 24' (pen.)	Stadium: The EnviroVent Stadium; Attendance: 2,330; Referee: Ben Speedie

19 November 2022 19	Stockport County	1–2	Leyton Orient	Edgeley
15:00 GMT	Hippolyte 5'	Report	Pratley 20', (yellow card) 65'; Beckles 67'; Brown (yellow card) 75'	Stadium: Edgeley Park; Attendance: 9,368; Referee: Seb Stockbridge

3 December 2022 20	Leyton Orient	3–0	Bradford City	Leyton
15:00 GMT	Kelman 24'; James 32'; Sotiriou 85'	Report	Platt (yellow card) 51'	Stadium: Breyer Group Stadium; Attendance: 8,671; Referee: Darren Drysdale

17 December 2022 21	Leyton Orient	2–0	Sutton United	Leyton
15:00 GMT	El Mizouni (yellow card) 2'; Smyth 62'; Smith 79' (o.g.); Archibald (yellow card) 89'	Report	John (yellow card) 32'	Stadium: Brisbane Road; Attendance: 8,069; Referee: Bobby Madden

27 December 2022 22	Leyton Orient	0–0	Stevenage	Leyton
12:00 GMT	El Mizouni (yellow card) 21'; Pratley (yellow card) 51'	Report	James-Wildin (yellow card) 45'; Rose (yellow card) 50'	Stadium: Brisbane Road; Attendance: 8,644; Referee: Charles Breakspear

30 December 2022 23	Newport County	0–0	Leyton Orient	Newport
19:45 GMT	Drysdale (yellow card) 36'	Report	Beckles (yellow card) 65'	Stadium: Rodney Parade; Attendance: 4,313; Referee: Peter Wright

2 January 2023 24	Northampton Town	1–0	Leyton Orient	Sixfields
15:00 GMT	Fox 51', (yellow card) 59'; Bowie (yellow card) 82'; Hylton (yellow card) 90+3'	Report	Archibald (yellow card) 64'; El Mizouni (yellow card) 83'; Beckles (red card) 90+4'	Stadium: Sixfields Stadium; Attendance: 7,475; Referee: Christopher Pollard

7 January 2023 25	Leyton Orient	1–0	Doncaster Rovers	Leyton
15:00 GMT	Smyth (yellow card) 51'; Archibald 68'	Report	Anderson (yellow card) 62'	Stadium: Brisbane Road; Attendance: 7,404; Referee: Alan Young

14 January 2023 26	Leyton Orient	0–0	Barrow	Leyton
15:00 GMT	Turns (yellow card) 22'; James (yellow card) 90+1' (yellow-red card) 90+4'	Report	Neal (yellow card) 30'; Brough (yellow card) 49'	Stadium: Brisbane Road; Attendance: 7,755; Referee: Leigh Doughty

21 January 2023 27	Stevenage	3–0	Leyton Orient	Stevenage
15:00 GMT	Reid 6'; Roberts 11'; Vancooten (yellow card) 19'; Piergianni (yellow card) 70'; Norris 90+1'	Report	El Mizouni (yellow card) 36' (yellow-red card) 45'; Smith (yellow card) 48'	Stadium: The Lamex Stadium; Attendance: 6,989; Referee: Scott Oldham

28 January 2023 28	Tranmere Rovers	1–0	Leyton Orient	Birkenhead
15:00 GMT	Beckles 82' (o.g.)	Report	Sotiriou (yellow card) 74'; Archibald (yellow card) 90'	Stadium: Prenton Park; Attendance: 5,946; Referee: Ollie Yates

4 February 2023 29	Leyton Orient	1–0	AFC Wimbledon	Leyton
15:00 GMT	Sweeney (yellow card) 36'; Moncur 64'; Sadlier (yellow card) 79'; El Mizouni (yellow card) 90+4'	Report	Kalambayi (yellow card) 21'	Stadium: Brisbane Road; Attendance: 8,639; Referee: Martin Woods

7 February 2023 30	Crewe Alexandra	0–2	Leyton Orient	Crewe
19:45 GMT	Nevitt (yellow card) 90+2'	Report	Turns 31'; Archibald 59'	Stadium: Mornflake Stadium; Attendance: 3,462; Referee: Sam Allison

11 February 2023 31	Walsall	1–1	Leyton Orient	Bescot
15:00 GMT	Low 20'; Willmott (yellow card) 22'; White (yellow card) 67'; Knowles (yellow card) 82'	Report	Sweeney (yellow card) 31'; Turns 83'	Stadium: Poundland Bescot Stadium; Attendance: 6,075; Referee: Anthony Backhouse

14 February 2023 32	Leyton Orient	2–1	Rochdale	Leyton
19:45 GMT	Sotiriou 18'; El Mizouni 29'; Kelman (yellow card) 90+5'	Report	Dodgson (yellow card) 28'; Lloyd 56'; Odoh (yellow card) 69'; Ebanks-Landell (yellow card) 83'; Campbell (yellow card) 90'	Stadium: Brisbane Road; Attendance: 6,540 (161 away); Referee: Sunny Gill

18 February 2023 33	Leyton Orient	1–0	Crawley Town	Leyton
15:00 GMT	El Mizouni 49'; James (yellow card) 56'; Beckles (yellow card) 87'	Report	Ogungbo (yellow card) 29'	Stadium: Brisbane Road; Attendance: 7,943 (432 away); Referee: Thomas Parsons

25 February 2023 34	Grimsby Town	2–2	Leyton Orient	Cleethorpes
15:00 GMT	McAtee 46'; Lloyd 52', (yellow card) 72'; Glennon (penalty missed) 75'	Report	Kelman 25', (yellow card) 75'; Moncur 68'; Archibald (yellow card) 72'; Sotiriou (yellow card) 75'	Stadium: Blundell Park; Attendance: 6,283; Referee: Andy Haines

5 March 2023 35	Leyton Orient	1–1	Swindon Town	Leyton
15:00 GMT	Beckles 12'; Turns (yellow card) 75'	Report	Wakeling 64'; McEachran (yellow card) 67'	Stadium: Brisbane Road; Attendance: 8,623 (1,252 away); Referee: Sam Barrott

18 March 2023 36	Leyton Orient	2–2	Colchester United	Leyton
15:00 GMT	Moncur 33' (pen.); Turns (yellow card) 50'; Sotiriou 68'; Vigouroux (yellow card) 79'; Drinan (yellow card) 90+5'	Report	Hopper (yellow card) 17'; Tchamadeu (yellow card) 32'; Hall 89'; Chilvers 90+2'	Stadium: Brisbane Road; Attendance: 8,684; Referee: Ross Joyce

25 March 2023 37	Hartlepool United	1–1	Leyton Orient	Hartlepool
15:00 GMT	Jennings 81'	Report	Smyth 48'; Brown (yellow card) 58'; Sotiriou (yellow card) 62'; Beckles (yellow card) 71'	Stadium: The Suit Direct Stadium; Attendance: 5,012; Referee: Edward Duckworth

1 April 2023 38	Leyton Orient	1–0	Carlisle United	Leyton
15:00 BST	Kelman (yellow card) 33' (yellow-red card) 77'; Pratley (yellow card) 45+2'; Moncur (yellow card) 64'; Mellish 73' (o.g.); Beckles (yellow card) 89'; Vigouroux (yellow card) 90+2'	Report	Armer (yellow card) 32'	Stadium: Brisbane Road; Attendance: 8,713 (1,177 away); Referee: Benjamin Speedie

7 April 2023 39	Salford City	0–2	Leyton Orient	Kersal
15:00 BST	Mariappa (yellow card) 42'; Touray (yellow card) 54'; Lund (yellow card) 90+4'; Watt (yellow card) 90+6'	Report	Sotiriou 22', (yellow card) 74'; Moncur 35'; Smyth (yellow card) 62'; Sweeney (yellow card) 90+4'; El Mizouni (yellow card) 90+6'	Stadium: The Peninsula Stadium; Attendance: 3,412; Referee: Darren Handley

10 April 2023 40	Leyton Orient	2–2	Harrogate Town	Leyton
15:00 BST	Sotiriou 9', 36'	Report	O'Connor 54', (yellow card) 83'; Thomson 57'; Falkingham (yellow card) 65'	Stadium: Brisbane Road; Attendance: 8,092; Referee: James Bell

15 April 2023 41	Sutton United	0–2	Leyton Orient	Sutton
15:00 BST	Angol (yellow card) 22'	Report	Sadlier 14'; James 26', (yellow card) 57'; Sotiriou (yellow card) 73'	Stadium: VBS Community Stadium; Attendance: 4,828; Referee: James Oldham

18 April 2023 42	Gillingham	2–0	Leyton Orient	Gillingham
19:45 BST	MacDonald 16'; Ehmer (yellow card) 32'; Alexander 76' (pen.)	Report	Beckles (red card) 14'; Pratley (yellow card) 21'; Smyth (yellow card) 26'; Hunt (yellow card) 45+3'; Tuurns (yellow card) 73'	Stadium: MEMS Priestfield Stadium; Attendance: 6,629; Referee: Carl Brook

22 April 2023 43	Leyton Orient	2–0	Crewe Alexandra	Leyton
15:00 BST	El Mizouni (yellow card) 27'; Moncur 51' (pen.); Kelman 77'	Report	Thomas (yellow card) 58'; Griffiths (yellow card) 80'	Stadium: Brisbane Road; Attendance: 8,311 (398 away); Referee: Sam Allison

25 April 2023 44	Mansfield Town	1–2	Leyton Orient	Mansfield
19:45 BST	Keillor-Dunn 10'; Wallace (yellow card) 21'; Kilgour (yellow card) 54'	Report	Kelman 17'; Sotiriou 31'; Thompson (yellow card) 45+6'; Clay (yellow card) 50'; Ogie (red card) 62'; Sargeant (yellow card) 82'	Stadium: One Call Stadium; Attendance: 7,072; Referee: Robert Lewis

29 April 2023 45	Leyton Orient	0–3	Stockport County	Leyton
15:00 BST	Hunt (yellow card) 20'; Smyth (yellow card) 33'	Report	Wright 5'; Camps 10'; Hippolyte (yellow card) 45+2'; Lemonheigh-Evans 81'; Hussey (yellow card) 90+1'	Stadium: Brisbane Road; Attendance: 8,615; Referee: Ollie Yates

8 May 2023 46	Bradford City	1–1	Leyton Orient	Bradford
12:30 BST	Smallwood (yellow card) 16'; Halliday 43'; Clayton (yellow card) 60'	Report	El Mizouni (yellow card) 14'; Beckles (yellow card) 19'; Brown 41'	Stadium: Valley Parade; Attendance: 22,576; Referee: Geoff Eltringham

=== FA Cup ===
Leyton Orient were drawn away to Crewe Alexandra in the first round.

Win Draw Loss Fixtures

5 November 2022 First round	Crewe Alexandra	1–0	Leyton Orient	Crewe
15:00 GMT	Thomas (yellow card) 31'; Sambou 90+2'	Report	Ogie (yellow card) 60'; Clay (red card) 87'	Stadium: Mornflake Stadium; Attendance: 2,104; Referee: Sam Purkiss

=== EFL Cup ===
Win Draw Loss Fixtures

Orient were drawn away to Forest Green Rovers in the first round.

9 August 2022 First round	Forest Green Rovers	2–0	Leyton Orient	Nailsworth
19:45 BST	Bernard (yellow card) 6'; Little 17', 50'; Bunker (yellow card) 78'	Report	Sweeney (yellow card) 5'; Moncur (yellow card) 34'	Stadium: The innocent New Lawn Stadium; Attendance: 1,055; Referee: James Oldham

=== EFL Trophy ===
On June 23, the group stage draw was finalised.

Pos	Div	Team	Pld	W	PW	PL	L	GF	GA	GD	Pts	Qualification
1	ACA	Chelsea U21	3	2	0	0	1	5	4	+1	6	Advance to Round 2
2	L2	Sutton United	3	2	0	0	1	4	3	+1	6	Advance to Round 2
3	L1	Oxford United	3	1	0	0	2	6	4	+2	3	
4	L2	Leyton Orient	3	1	0	0	2	5	9	−4	3	

Source: EFL.com

Win Draw Loss Fixtures

30 August 2022 Group stage	Oxford United	5–0	Leyton Orient	Littlemore
19:45 BST	Mousinho 4'; Brannagan 45+3'; Joseph 57'; Findlay 66'; Taylor 84'	Report	Sotiriou (yellow card) 70'	Stadium: The Kassam Stadium; Attendance: 1,373; Referee: Tom Nield

20 September 2022 Group stage	Leyton Orient	3–1	Sutton United	Leyton
19:00 BST	Wareham 5', 10'; Sotiriou (yellow card) 60'; James (yellow card) 80', (goal) 90+1'; Sargeant (yellow card) 83'	Report	Kouassi 12'; Eastmond (yellow card) 52' (yellow-red card) 90'; Barden (yellow card) 82'	Stadium: Breyer Group Stadium; Attendance: 1,073; Referee: Sam Allison

18 October 2022 Group stage	Leyton Orient	2–3	Chelsea U21	Leyton
20:30 BST	Williams 71' (o.g.); Drinan 77' (pen.)	Report	Hutchinson 54'; Hall (yellow card) 67'; Mothersille 89' 90+3'	Stadium: Breyer Group Stadium; Attendance: 1,117; Referee: Lee Swabey

== Player statistics ==
=== Appearances and goals ===
- Players listed with no appearances have been in the matchday squad but only as unused substitutes.

No.	Pos	Nat	Player	Total		League Two		FA Cup		EFL Cup		EFL Trophy	
No.	Pos	Nat	Player	Apps	Goals	Apps	Goals	Apps	Goals	Apps	Goals	Apps	Goals
Goalkeepers
1	GK	(England) ENG	Sam Sargeant	4	0	1	0	0	0	0	0	3	0
22	GK	(Chile) CHI	Lawrence Vigouroux	47	0	45	0	1	0	1	0	0	0
27	GK	(England) ENG	Rhys Byrne	0	0	0	0	0	0	0	0	0	0
Defenders
2	DF	(Wales) WAL	Tom James	46	5	36+5	4	1	0	1	0	0+3	1
4	DF	(Republic of Ireland) IRL	Shadrach Ogie	15	0	3+7	0	1	0	1	0	3	0
5	DF	(England) ENG	Dan Happe	25	0	23+2	0	0	0	0	0	0	0
6	DF	(Northern Ireland) NIR	Adam Thompson	16	0	5+8	0	0	0	1	0	2	0
19	DF	(Grenada) GRN	Omar Beckles	44	3	41	3	1	0	1	0	1	0
24	DF	(England) ENG	Jayden Sweeney	26	0	18+4	0	0	0	1	0	3	0
32	DF	(England) ENG	Rob Hunt	33	0	29+3	0	1	0	0	0	0	0
33	DF	(Scotland) SCO	Jamie McCart	9	0	7+2	0	0	0	0	0	0	0
43	DF	(Wales) WAL	Ed Turns	16	2	16	2	0	0	0	0	0	0
Midfielders
8	MF	(England) ENG	Craig Clay	36	0	10+22	0	1	0	0	0	3	0
12	MF	(England) ENG	Jordan Brown	39	1	15+19	1	1	0	0+1	0	2+1	0
14	MF	(England) ENG	George Moncur	45	9	35+8	9	1	0	1	0	0	0
15	MF	(Tunisia) TUN	Idris El Mizouni	44	3	40+1	3	0+1	0	0	0	0+2	0
17	MF	(Australia) AUS	Jordan Lyden	5	0	2+3	0	0	0	0	0	0	0
18	MF	(England) ENG	Darren Pratley	42	1	34+5	1	0	0	0+1	0	2	0
20	MF	(Cyprus) CYP	Anthony Georgiou	2	0	0	0	0	0	1	0	1	0
25	MF	(England) ENG	Harrison Sodje	0	0	0	0	0	0	0	0	0	0
34	MF	(Republic of Ireland) IRL	Kieran Sadlier	19	1	17+2	1	0	0	0	0	0	0
40	MF	(Guyana) GUY	Stephen Duke-McKenna	12	0	0+9	0	1	0	0	0	2	0
Forwards
7	FW	(Northern Ireland) NIR	Paul Smyth	42	10	34+4	10	0+1	0	1	0	0+2	0
10	FW	(Cyprus) CYP	Ruel Sotiriou	45	9	23+19	9	1	0	0	0	2	0
11	FW	(Scotland) SCO	Theo Archibald	39	5	30+5	5	0+1	0	0+1	0	2	0
16	FW	(Republic of Ireland) IRL	Aaron Drinan	37	3	15+18	2	0+1	0	0	0	1+2	1
23	FW	(United States) USA	Charlie Kelman	47	7	26+17	7	1	0	0+1	0	1+1	0
Out on Loan
3	DF	(England) ENG	Connor Wood	2	0	0	0	0	0	0+1	0	1	0
9	FW	(England) ENG	Harry Smith	10	0	0+8	0	0	0	1	0	1	0
26	FW	(Wales) WAL	Sonny Fish	0	0	0	0	0	0	0	0	0	0
28	FW	(England) ENG	Daniel Nkrumah	0	0	0	0	0	0	0	0	0	0
29	MF	(England) ENG	Zech Obiero	2	0	0	0	0	0	1	0	1	0
30	MF	(England) ENG	Jephte Tanga	0	0	0	0	0	0	0	0	0	0
Left during the Season
13	FW	(England) ENG	Jayden Wareham	7	2	2+3	0	0	0	0	0	2	2

Last updated: 9 May 2023
Source: Competitions

=== Top scorers ===
Includes all competitive matches. The list is sorted by squad number when total goals are equal.

Last updated 9 May 2023

Rank	No.	Nationality	Player	League Two	FA Cup	EFL Cup	EFL Trophy	Total
1	7	(Northern Ireland)	Paul Smyth	10	0	0	0	10
2	10	(Cyprus)	Ruel Sotiriou	9	0	0	0	9
2	14	(England)	George Moncur	9	0	0	0	9
4	23	(United States)	Charlie Kelman	7	0	0	0	7
5	2	(Wales)	Tom James	4	0	0	1	5
5	11	(Scotland)	Theo Archibald	5	0	0	0	5
7	15	(Tunisia)	Idris El Mizouni	3	0	0	0	3
7	16	(Republic of Ireland)	Aaron Drinan	2	0	0	1	3
7	19	(Grenada)	Omar Beckles	3	0	0	0	3
10	13	(England)	Jayden Wareham	0	0	0	2	2
10	43	(Wales)	Ed Turns	2	0	0	0	2
12	12	(England)	Jordan Brown	1	0	0	0	1
12	18	(England)	Darren Pratley	1	0	0	0	1
12	34	(Republic of Ireland)	Kieran Sadlier	1	0	0	0	1
Own goals				4	0	0	1	5
TOTALS				61	0	0	5	66
