= Jephte Tanga =

English footballer

Personal information
- Full name: Jephte Matuba Tanga
- Date of birth: 16 June 2003 (age 23)
- Place of birth: Lambeth, England
- Position: Midfielder

Team information
- Current team: Tonbridge Angels

Youth career
- –2021: Leyton Orient

Senior career*
Years	Team	Apps	(Gls)
2021–2024	Leyton Orient	1	(0)
2022	→ Sutton Common Rovers (loan)	8	(0)
2022	→ Royston Town (loan)	3	(0)
2022	→ Sutton Common Rovers (loan)	8	(2)
2022–2023	→ Cray Wanderers (loan)	21	(0)
2023	→ Welling United (loan)	25	(2)
2024	→ Maidstone United (loan)	23	(2)
2024–2025	Ebbsfleet United	18	(0)
2025–2026	Maidstone United	45	(7)
2026–	Tonbridge Angels	0	(0)
- * Club domestic league appearances and goals as of 1014, 27 June 2026 (UTC)

Jephte Matuba Tanga (born 16 June 2004) is an English professional footballer who plays as a midfielder for National League South club Tonbridge Angels.

== Career ==
Tanga made his senior debut for Leyton Orient in the EFL Trophy in the 1–0 win at home to Southampton U21 on 14 September 2021, coming on as a second-half substitute for Callum Reilly. He later appeared in the 0–0 draw with Milton Keynes Dons in the same competition, again as a substitute, this time for Tyrese Omotoye. Orient lost the match after a penalty shoot-out.

On 14 January 2022, Leyton Orient confirmed Tanga had gone on loan to Sutton Common Rovers, where he won Rovers' Player of the Month award for February. On his return to Orient, he made his league debut as a late substitute for Adam Thompson in the 2–2 draw at Colchester United.

In June 2022, Tanga signed his first professional contract with Orient, alongside defender Harrison Sodje. On 19 August 2022, Tanga signed for Royston Town on a 28-day loan. In October 2022, Tanga rejoined Sutton Common Rovers on loan. In November 2022, Tanga joined Cray Wanderers on loan. Tanga won the players player of the season award at Cray.

Following the conclusion of the 2023–24 season, Tanga departed Leyton Orient on a free transfer.

In July 2024, Tanga joined National League side Ebbsfleet United, the club fighting off competition from a number of other sides at the level.

In June 2025, he returned to former club Maidstone United on a permanent deal. He was offered a new contract at the end of the 2025–26 season, however he rejected this deal and departed the club.

On 26 June 2026, Tanga joined National League South club Tonbridge Angels.

== Statistics ==
As of match played 1 March 2022

Appearances and goals by club, season and competition
Club	Season	League			FA Cup		EFL Cup		Other		Total	
Club	Season	Division	Apps	Goals	Apps	Goals	Apps	Goals	Apps	Goals	Apps	Goals
Leyton Orient	2021–22	League Two	1	0	0	0	0	0	2 (Note: Appearance(s) in EFL Trophy)	0	3	0
Career total			1	0	0	0	0	0	2	0	3	0
