= 2025 EFL League One play-off final =

Association football match

2025 EFL League One play-off Final
- Wembley Stadium in London hosted the final.
Charlton Athletic	Leyton Orient
1	0
- Date: 25 May 2025
- Venue: Wembley Stadium, London
- Referee: Andrew Kitchen
- Attendance: 76,193

The 2025 EFL League One play-off final was an association football match which was played on 25 May 2025 at Wembley Stadium, London, to determine the third and final team to gain promotion from EFL League One, the third tier of English football, to the EFL Championship. The top two teams of the 2024–25 EFL League One, champions Birmingham City and 2nd-placed Wrexham, gained automatic promotion to the Championship, while the clubs placed from third to sixth in the table – Stockport County, Charlton Athletic, Wycombe Wanderers and Leyton Orient – took part in the 2025 English Football League play-offs.

Charlton Athletic won the play-off final 1–0 against London rivals Leyton Orient to gain promotion to the EFL Championship, the first time in this league since their relegation in the 2019–20 season.

== Route to the final ==
EFL League One final table, leading positions
Pos	Team	Pld	W	D	L	GF	GA	GD	Pts	Qualification
1	Birmingham City (C, P)	46	34	9	3	84	31	+53	111	Promotion to 2025–26 EFL Championship
2	Wrexham (P)	46	27	11	8	67	34	+33	92	Promotion to 2025–26 EFL Championship
3	Stockport County	46	25	12	9	72	42	+30	87	Eliminated
4	Charlton Athletic (O, P)	46	25	10	11	67	43	+24	85	Qualified
5	Wycombe Wanderers	46	24	12	10	70	45	+25	84	Eliminated
6	Leyton Orient	46	24	6	16	72	48	+24	78	Qualified

Source: EFL Official Website
(C) Champions; (O) Play-off winners; (P) Promoted

Reading who finished three points off 6th place and the final play-off spot lost out to Leyton Orient on the final day as Reading lost 3-2 to Barnsley at the Madejski Stadium and Leyton Orient won 4-1 away to Huddersfield Town at the Kirklees Stadium with Reading around the playoffs from 26 October 2024 until the end of season with draws in March against Crawley Town (away at the Broadfield Stadium), Stevenage (at home at the Madejski Stadium) and Northampton Town (away at Sixfields Stadium) costing them a place in the play-offs but they were taken over by American attorney and businessman Rob Couhig who previously owned Wycombe Wanderers on 14 May 2025 to end their turmoil under former Dai Yongge who took over after the 2017 EFL Championship play-off final. Charlton Athletic finished the regular 2024–25 season in fourth place in EFL League One, the third tier of the English football league system, two places and seven points ahead of Leyton Orient. Both, therefore, missed out on the two automatic places for promotion to the EFL Championship and instead took part the play-offs to determine the third promoted team. Charlton finished seven points behind Wrexham (who were promoted in second place) and 26 behind league winners Birmingham City. They finished a point a head of Wycombe Wanderers, their opponents in the play-off semi-final. Leyton Orient finished nine points behind Stockport County, their semi-final opponents.

The first leg between Wycombe Wanderers and Charlton took place at Adams Park on 11 May. The finished in a 0–0 draw.

On 10 May, Leyton Orient played Stockport County at Brisbane Road drawing 2–2. Charlie Kelman put Orient ahead in the 30th minute scoring from an Omar Beckles assist and Oliver Norwood then equalised for County in the 60th minute with a penalty kick for a handball by Rarmani Edmonds-Green and Fraser Horsfall then put the visitors ahead in the 65th minute from an Oliver Norwood cross. Charlie Kelman then equalised for the hosts in the 88th minute with another penalty kick for another handball by Fraser Horsfall.

Charlton then played their second leg against Wycombe Wanderers on 15 May at The Valley winning 1–0. Matt Godden scored the sole goal in the 81st minute to give Charlton a 1–0 on the night and a 1–0 victory on aggregate. This sent them to their first play-off final since the 2019 EFL League One play-off final where they beat Sunderland 2–1.

Leyton Orient played their semi-final second leg at Edgeley Park on 14 May drawing 1–1 after extra time and winning 4-1 on penalties. Ollie O'Neill opened the scoring for Orient in the 3rd minute from an Ethan Galbraith free-kick and Isaac Olaofe then equalised for Stockport in the 74th minute from a Jack Diamond assist. As no further goals were scored in extra time the match went to penalties with only Oliver Norwood scoring his spot-kick for County with Jack Diamond and Ryan Rydel missing their penalties. Tom James, Sean Clare, Azeem Abdulai and Ethan Galbraith all successfully convertered their spot kicks to send Leyton Orient to their first play-off final since the 2014 Football League One play-off final where they drew 2–2 and lost 4–3 on penalties to Rotherham United.

== Match ==
=== Team news ===
Nathan Jones' Charlton Athletic lined-up in a 4-1-4-1 with Will Mannion in goal, a back four of Kayne Ramsay, Lloyd Jones, Macaulay Gillesphey and Josh Edwards, Conor Coventry as the lone central defensive midfielder, then a midfield four Thierry Small, Alex Gilbert, captain Greg Docherty and Tyreece Campbell and Matt Godden as the lone striker while Richie Wellens' Leyton Orient lined-up in a 4-2-3-1 with Josh Keeley in goal, a traditional back four of Ethan Galbraith, captain Omar Beckles, Rarmani Edmonds-Green and Jack Currie, a defensive midfield two of Sean Clare and Jordan Brown, then Daniel Agyei on the right and Ollie O'Neill on the left, Jamie Donley on the left and Charlie Kelman as the lone striker.

=== Summary ===
==== First-half ====
In the 13th minute, Ethan Galbraith missed a right-footed shot from outside the box after an assist from Jordan Brown. In the 19th minute, Ollie O'Neill had a shot blocked for Leyton Orient after an assist from Jamie Donley. In the 29th minute, Tyreece Campbell won a free-kick for Charlton Athletic which Macaulay Gillesphey scored into the right corner of the net in the 31st minute past Leyton Orient keeper Josh Keeley. In the 41st minute, Daniel Agyei had a shot blocked for Leyton Orient by the Charlton Athletic defence after a left-footed shot from the right side of Addicks' box and Rarmani Edmonds-Green missed a header from the centre of Charlton Athletic's box after a corner kick from Jamie Donley. In the 44th minute, Ollie O'Neill had has right-footed shot from a difficult angle on the right which was blocked by Charlton Athletic's defence and Daniel Agyei then also had his left-footed shot from the centre of the box blocked by the Addicks' defence. In the 45th minute, in the final action of the first half, Alex Gilbert's right-footed shot from outside the Leyton Orient box went over the bar.

==== Second half ====
In the 55th minute, Jack Currie's left-footed shot from outside the box was blocked by the Charlton Athletic defence. In the 58th minute, Jack Currie's left-footed shot from outside the box was again blocked by the Addicks' defence and Jordan Brown's right-footed shot from the centre of the box went over the bar after a corner kick. In the 62nd minute, Charlie Kelman's right-footed shot from outside was blocked by Charlton Athletic's defence and Sean Clare's header from the right side of the six-yard box went over the bar after a corner kick by Jamie Donley. In the 66th minute both Jamie Donley and Ollie O'Neill had their shots blocked by the Charlton Athletic defence. In the 67th minute, Nathan Jones made Charlton Athletic's first two changes of the match with Tennai Watson replacing Thierry Small and Karoy Anderson replacing Alex Gilbert. In the 70th minute, Charlton Athletic captain Greg Docherty's right-footed shot from outside of Leyton Orient's box was saved in the top centre of the goal by Leyton Orient goalkeeper Josh Keeley. In the 74th minute Richie Wellens made Orient's first two changes of the match with Thomas James replacing Sean Clare and Dominic Ball replacing Jordan Brown. In the 78th minute, Ollie O'Neill's left-footed shot from the left side of the box was blocked by Charlton Athletic's defence. In the 81st minute, Nathan Jones made another two changes for Charlton Athletic with Chuks Aneke replacing Matt Godden and Micah Mbick replacing Tyreece Campbell and in the 82nd minute Richie Wellens made a triple change for Leyton Orient with Daniel Happe replacing captain Omar Beckles, Azeem Abdulai replacing Daniel Agyei and Randell Williams replacing Ollie O'Neill. In the 89th minute, Chuks Aneke's right-footed shot from a difficult angle and from long range on the left was saved in the bottom left corner by Leyton Orient keeper Josh Keeley. In the 92nd minute, Randell Williams received the match's first yellow card from referee Andrew Kitchen and he also missed a left-footed shot from outside the box which went wide. In the 100th minute, in the final action of the second half and the match, Dan Happe's header from the centre of the box was saved in the top centre of the goal by Charlton Athletic goalkeeper Will Mannion. This meant that the match finished in a 1-0 win for the Addicks who were promoted to the 2025-26 EFL Championship keeping Leyton Orient in the 2025-26 EFL League One.

=== Details ===
25 May 2025
13:01 BST

Charlton Athletic	1–0	Leyton Orient
Gillesphey 31'	Report

Wembley Stadium, London
Attendance: 76,193
Referee: Andrew Kitchen

Charlton Athletic	Leyton Orient

GK	25	(England) Will Mannion
CB	2	(England) Kayne Ramsay
CB	5	(England) Lloyd Jones	(yellow card) 90+2'
CB	3	(England) Macaulay Gillesphey
RWB	26	(England) Thierry Small		(substituted off) 68'
CM	6	(Republic of Ireland) Conor Coventry
CM	10	(Scotland) Greg Docherty (c)
LWB	16	(Scotland) Josh Edwards
AM	17	(Republic of Ireland) Alex Gilbert		(substituted off) 68'
AM	7	(England) Tyreece Campbell		(substituted off) 81'
CF	24	(England) Matt Godden		(substituted off) 81'
Substitutes:
GK	21	(Australia) Ashley Maynard-Brewer
DF	4	(England) Alex Mitchell
DF	27	(England) Tennai Watson		(substituted on) 68'
MF	8	(England) Luke Berry
MF	18	(Jamaica) Karoy Anderson		(substituted on) 68'
FW	22	(England) Chuks Aneke		(substituted on) 81'
FW	33	(England) Micah Mbick		(substituted on) 81'
Head Coach:
(Wales) Nathan Jones

GK	24	(Republic of Ireland) Josh Keeley
RB	22	(Northern Ireland) Ethan Galbraith
CB	19	(Grenada) Omar Beckles (c)	(substituted off) 82'
CB	45	(England) Rarmani Edmonds-Green
LB	12	(England) Jack Currie
CM	8	(England) Jordan Brown	(substituted off) 74'
CM	28	(England) Sean Clare	(substituted off) 74'
RW	7	(England) Dan Agyei	(substituted off) 82'
AM	17	(Northern Ireland) Jamie Donley
LW	21	(Republic of Ireland) Ollie O'Neill	(substituted off) 82'
CF	23	(United States) Charlie Kelman
Substitutes:
GK	26	(England) Noah Phillips
DF	2	(Wales) Tom James	(substituted on) 74'
DF	5	(England) Dan Happe	(substituted on) 82'
MF	9	(England) Randell Williams	(substituted on) 82'
MF	15	(England) Dominic Ball	(substituted on) 74'
MF	47	(Scotland) Azeem Abdulai	(substituted on) 82'
FW	44	(England) Dilan Markanday
Head Coach:
(England) Richie Wellens

Statistics
	Charlton Athletic	Leyton Orient
Possession	37%	63%
Goals scored	1	0
Shots on target	3	1
Shots off target	2	15
Fouls committed	11	9
Corner kicks	2	6
Yellow cards	1	0
Red cards	0	0

== Post-match ==
Charlton Athletic manager Nathan Jones said this to Sky Sports about promotion to the EFL Championship for the following season: "This is euphoria. We've had to battle, we didn't play well. We just defended really well. To win a game here [at Wembley Stadium] and keep a clean sheet, I'm so, so happy. There's also a bit of relief, but the majority is euphoria and pride. This is a good [Leyton] Orient side, and they've hardly had a chance on goal. And that's down to our side. I wanted to build something. That's why I came here [to Charlton Athletic]. It's the first step. Now we kick on".

Leyton Orient manager Richie Wellens said in this to BBC Sport in his post-match press conference about losing the final and remaining in EFL League One for the following season: "It's really difficult for me, it's heart-breaking to be honest, it is hard". On player retention for the following season: "Our budget is not like some other clubs. The end of that [first] season, I lost two or three of my best players. Next season, we got promoted, I lost a few more. It's the same every season. Potentially, we're going to lose six or seven now. I am gutted for the supporters but I'm also heartbroken this is the last time I will ever manage this set of players as a collective".

Prior to the following season Charlton Athletic made 9 signings with Sonny Carey joining from EFL League One club Blackpool, Thomas Kaminski joining from another EFL League One club Luton Town, Tanto Olaofe joining from Stockport County, Amari'i Bell also signing from Luton Town alongside Reece Burke, Joe Rankin-Costello joining from fellow EFL Championship club Blackburn Rovers, Rob Apter also signing from Blackpool, Charlie Kelman signing from Leyton Orient - after playing against Charlton Athletic in the play-off final in the previous season and also winning the 2024-25 EFL League One Golden Boot - and Harvey Knibbs singing from Reading - after he was the first person since Dave Kitson to score 15 or more goals in all competitions for the Royals in back-to-back seasons since the 2005-06 season. However, the following players left Charlton Athletic at the end of the previous season: Chuks Aneke who later joined EFL League Two club Shrewsbury Town, Dean Bouzanis who joined A-League club Brisbane Roar, Aaron Henry who later joined National League club Boreham Wood, Danny Hylton who retired, Thierry Small who joined EFL Championship club Preston North End and Tennai Watson who signed for EFL League One club Barnsley.

Leyton Orient also made 9 signings in order to have another go at getting promoted to the EFL Championship with Killian Cahill joining from Premier League club Brighton & Hove Albion, Demetri Mitchell joining from EFL League One club Exeter City, Michael Craig signing from another EFL League One club Reading, Idris El Mizouni signing from EFL Championship club Oxford United, Aaron Connolly signing from another EFL Championship club Millwall, Tyreeq Bakinson joining from Wycombe Wanderers, Josh Koroma signing from Huddersfield Town, Lemar Gordon joining from Fulham and Charlie Wellens signing from Reading - like Michael Craig earlier in the window and to join his dad Richie Wellens at the club. However, the following players left Leyton Orient at the end of the previous season: Ethan Galbraith who later joined EFL Championship club Swansea City, Jordan Brown who signed for EFL League One club Blackpool, Charlie Pegrum who joined National League South club Hornchurch and Brandon Cooper who then joined EFL League Two club Salford City.
