= 2024–25 Leyton Orient F.C. season =

126th season in existence of Leyton Orient FC

Leyton Orient
2024–25 season
- Chairman: Nigel Travis
- Head Coach: Richie Wellens
- Stadium: Brisbane Road
- League One: 6th
- Play-Offs: Finalist
- FA Cup: Fourth round
- EFL Cup: Third round
- EFL Trophy: Round of 16
- Top goalscorer: League: Charlie Kelman (21); All: Charlie Kelman (27)
- Average home league attendance: 7,890
| Home colours | Away colours | Third colours |

The 2024–25 season is the 126th season in the history of Leyton Orient Football Club and their second consecutive season in League One. The club are participating in League One, and also competed in the FA Cup, the EFL Cup, and the EFL Trophy.

== Kit ==
Puma Continued as Kit Suppliers with financial entity Eastdil Secured. being front of shirt sponsor.

== Transfers ==
=== In ===
| Date | Pos. | Player | From | Fee | Ref. |
|---|---|---|---|---|---|
| 4 July 2024 | RW | Diallang Jaiyesimi (ENG) | Charlton Athletic (ENG) | Free | |
| 16 July 2024 | CM | Lewis Warrington (ENG) | Everton (ENG) | Free | |
| 21 July 2024 | RB | Sean Clare (ENG) | Wigan Athletic (ENG) | Undisclosed | |
| 10 September 2024 | DM | Dominic Ball (ENG) | Ipswich Town (ENG) | Free | |
| 22 January 2025 | CB | Azeem Abdulai (SCO) | Swansea City (WAL) | Undisclosed | |
| 31 January 2025 | RW | Sonny Perkins (ENG) | Leeds United (ENG) | Undisclosed | |
| 3 February 2025 | CB | Rarmani Edmonds-Green (ENG) | Charlton Athletic (ENG) | Undisclosed | |
| 3 February 2025 | LM | Randell Williams (ENG) | Bolton Wanderers (ENG) | Free | |

=== Out ===
| Date | Pos. | Player | To | Fee | Ref. |
|---|---|---|---|---|---|
| 3 July 2024 | CM | Max Sanders (ENG) | Crewe Alexandra (ENG) | Undisclosed | |
| 21 March 2025 | CM | George Moncur (ENG) | Ebbsfleet United (ENG) | Free | |

=== Loaned in ===
| Date | Pos. | Player | From | Date until | Ref. |
|---|---|---|---|---|---|
| 1 July 2024 (Note: The loan was announced on 29 June, and would officially commence on July 1) | CF | Charlie Kelman (USA) | Queens Park Rangers (ENG) | End of Season | |
| 1 July 2024 (Note: The loan was announced on 27 June, and would officially commence on July 1) | CF | Sonny Perkins (ENG) | Leeds United (ENG) | 31 January 2025 (Note: On 31 January, Perkins joined the club on a permanent deal) | |
| 23 July 2024 | GK | Zach Hemming (ENG) | Middlesbrough (ENG) | 1 January 2025 (Note: On 1 January, Hemming was recalled back to Middlesbrough) | |
| 16 August 2024 | SS | Jamie Donley (ENG) | Tottenham Hotspur (ENG) | End of Season | |
| 30 August 2024 | LB | Jack Currie (ENG) | Oxford United (ENG) | End of Season | |
| 30 August 2024 | GK | Josh Keeley (IRL) | Tottenham Hotspur (ENG) | End of Season | |
| 16 January 2025 | RW | Dilan Markanday (ENG) | Blackburn Rovers (ENG) | End of Season | |

=== Loaned out ===
| Date | Pos. | Player | To | Date until | Ref. |
|---|---|---|---|---|---|
| 11 July 2024 | CF | Joe Pigott (ENG) | AFC Wimbledon (ENG) | End of Season | |
| 3 August 2024 | GK | Rhys Byrne (ENG) | Bowers & Pitsea (ENG) | November 2024 | |
| 14 August 2024 | AM | Thomas Avgoustidis (GRE) | Potters Bar Town (ENG) | 11 September 2024 | |
| 14 August 2024 | CM | Hayden Bullas (ENG) | Erith Town (ENG) | 11 September 2024 | |
| 14 August 2024 | CF | Reon Smith-Kouassi (ENG) | Potters Bar Town (ENG) | 11 September 2024 | |
| 20 August 2024 | CM | George Moncur (ENG) | Southend United (ENG) | 7 January 2025 (Note: On 7 January, Moncur was recalled back from his loan at Southend and was subsequently loaned to Ebbsfleet.) | |
| 2 September 2024 | RM | Charlie Pegrum (ENG) | Welling United (ENG) | 10 November 2024 | |
| 17 September 2024 | GK | Sam Howes (ENG) | Wealdstone (ENG) | 12 November 2024 | |
| 17 October 2024 | CF | Reon Smith-Kouassi (ENG) | Grays Athletic (ENG) | 14 December 2024 | |
| 13 November 2024 | RM | Charlie Pegrum (ENG) | Tonbridge Angels (ENG) | 5 February 2025 | |
| 20 December 2024 | DM | Makai Welch (JAM) | Hendon (ENG) | 29 January 2025 | |
| 7 January 2025 | CM | George Moncur (ENG) | Ebbsfleet United (ENG) | 21 March 2025 (Note: On 21 March, Moncur's loan at Ebbsfleet was made permanent) | |
| 14 January 2025 | GK | Rhys Byrne (ENG) | Salisbury (ENG) | 11 February 2025 | |
| 23 January 2025 | CM | Lewis Warrington (ENG) | Salford City (ENG) | End of Season | |

=== Released / Out of Contract ===
| Date | Pos. | Player | Subsequent club | Joined date | Ref. |
|---|---|---|---|---|---|
| 30 June 2024 | RB | Rob Hunt (ENG) | Colchester United (ENG) | 1 July 2024 | |
| 30 June 2024 | CB | Ethan Light (ENG) | Hemel Hempstead Town (ENG) | 1 July 2024 | |
| 30 June 2024 | CF | Ruel Sotiriou (CYP) | Bristol Rovers (ENG) | 1 July 2024 | |
| 30 June 2024 | CM | Jephte Tanga (ENG) | Ebbsfleet United (ENG) | 10 July 2024 | |
| 30 June 2024 | DM | Emmanuel Harvest (ENG) | Hornchurch (ENG) | 10 August 2024 | |
| 30 June 2024 | LB | Harrison Sodje (ENG) | Cray Wanderers (ENG) | 17 August 2024 | |
| 30 June 2024 | CB | Adam Thompson (NIR) | | | |

== Pre-season and friendlies ==
On 12 May, The O's announced they would return to Spain for a pre-season training camp in Málaga. Five days later, they announced they would travel to Hornchurch to kick-off the pre-season campaign. A second friendly, versus Dagenham & Redbridge was also shortly added. On June 4, the club added a double-header to their pre-season schedule, versus Welling United and St Albans City. Two weeks later, a fifth fixture was added, against Cheshunt. On 28 June, fixtures against Heart of Midlothian and Juventud de Torremolinos were added. A fixture to honour Justin Edinburgh against Tottenham Hotspur U21 was also later added.

Win Draw Loss Fixtures

| 9 July 2024 Friendly | Hornchurch | 0–7 | Leyton Orient | Upminster |
| 19:30 BST | | Report | Agyei 37'; Perkins 40'; Jaiyesimi 50'; Kelman (?), 81'; Own goal (?); Pegrum 85' | Stadium: Hornchurch Stadium |

| 13 July 2024 Friendly | Heart of Midlothian | 1–2 | Leyton Orient | Gorgie |
| 15:00 BST | Boyce 9' | Report | Brown 23'; Jaiyesimi 46' | Stadium: Tynecastle Park |

| 16 July 2024 Friendly | St Albans City | 1–5 | Leyton Orient | St Albans |
| 19:45 BST | Banton 38' | | Agyei 1', 31', 52', 66'; Kelman 20' | Stadium: Clarence Park |

| 16 July 2024 Friendly | Welling United | 1–1 | Leyton Orient | Welling |
| 19:45 BST | Walker 90' | Report | James 36' | Stadium: Park View Road |

| 20 July 2024 Friendly | Arsenal | 2–0 | Leyton Orient | London Colney |
| 13:00 BST | Gabriel Jesus 22'; Smith Rowe 48' | Report | | Stadium: Arsenal Training Centre; Attendance: 0 (Behind-closed-doors) |

| 25 July 2024 Friendly | Juventud de Torremolinos | 0–0 | Leyton Orient | Torremolinos |
| 19:30 CEST (18:30 BST) | | Report | | Stadium: Estadio Municipal El Pozuelo |

| 30 July 2024 Friendly | Leyton Orient | 2–1 | Tottenham Hotspur U21 | Dagenham |
| 19:30 BST | Kelman 5', 19' | Report | Williams 45' | Stadium: Victoria Road |

| 3 August 2024 Friendly | Dagenham & Redbridge | 0–1 | Leyton Orient | Dagenham |
| 15:00 BST | | Report | Cooper 83' | Stadium: Victoria Road; Attendance: 1,098 |

| 5 August 2024 Friendly | Cheshunt | 2–1 | Leyton Orient | Cheshunt |
| 19:45 BST | Elliott 19'; Serigne 44' | Report | Avgoustidis 79' | Stadium: Theobalds Lane |

== Competitions ==
=== League One ===
==== League table ====
| Pos | Team | Pld | W | D | L | GF | GA | GD | Pts | Promotion, qualification or relegation |
|---|---|---|---|---|---|---|---|---|---|---|
| 4 | Charlton Athletic (O, P) | 46 | 25 | 10 | 11 | 67 | 43 | +24 | 85 | Qualification for League One play-offs |
| 5 | Wycombe Wanderers | 46 | 24 | 12 | 10 | 70 | 45 | +25 | 84 | Qualification for League One play-offs |
| 6 | Leyton Orient | 46 | 24 | 6 | 16 | 72 | 48 | +24 | 78 | Qualification for League One play-offs |
| 7 | Reading | 46 | 21 | 12 | 13 | 68 | 57 | +11 | 75 | |
| 8 | Bolton Wanderers | 46 | 20 | 8 | 18 | 67 | 70 | −3 | 68 | |

Source: EFL Official Website
Rules for classification: 1) Points; 2) Goal difference; 3) Number of goals scored; 4) Head-to-head results; 5) Wins; 6) Away goals; 7) Penalty points (sec 9.5); 8) 12-point sending off offences
(O) Play-off winners; (P) Promoted

==== Results summary ====
| Overall | | | | | | | | Home | | | | | | Away | | | | | |
| Pld | W | D | L | GF | GA | GD | Pts | W | D | L | GF | GA | GD | W | D | L | GF | GA | GD |
|---|---|---|---|---|---|---|---|---|---|---|---|---|---|---|---|---|---|---|---|
| 46 | 24 | 6 | 16 | 72 | 48 | +24 | 78 | 12 | 4 | 7 | 33 | 19 | +14 | 12 | 2 | 9 | 39 | 29 | +10 |

Last updated: 3 May 2025.
Source: Soccerway

==== Results by round ====
| Round | 1 | 2 | 3 | 4 | 6 | 7 | 5^{1} | 8 | 9 | 10 | 12 | 13 | 14 | 15 | 17 | 11^{2} | 18 | 19 | 20 | 21 | 22 | 23 | 24 | 25 | 27 | 28 | 29 | 30 | 16^{3} | 32 | 31^{5} | 33 | 26^{4} | 34 | 35 | 36 | 37 | 39 | 40 | 41 | 38^{6} | 42 | 43 | 44 | 45 | 46 |
|---|---|---|---|---|---|---|---|---|---|---|---|---|---|---|---|---|---|---|---|---|---|---|---|---|---|---|---|---|---|---|---|---|---|---|---|---|---|---|---|---|---|---|---|---|---|---|
| Ground | H | A | H | A | A | A | H | H | H | A | A | H | A | H | A | H | H | A | H | A | H | H | A | H | A | H | A | H | H | H | A | A | A | H | A | H | A | H | A | H | A | A | H | A | H | A |
| Result | L | L | L | L | W | W | D | D | L | L | L | W | L | W | D | L | W | W | D | W | W | W | W | W | D | W | W | L | W | W | W | L | L | L | L | L | W | W | L | D | W | W | W | W | W | W |
| Position | 18 | 20 | 23 | 24 | 22 | 19 | 16 | 18 | 20 | 19 | 20 | 20 | 20 | 20 | 21 | 21 | 20 | 16 | 18 | 15 | 13 | 10 | 8 | 8 | 8 | 7 | 6 | 6 | 7 | 6 | 6 | 6 | 6 | 8 | 9 | 9 | 9 | 9 | 9 | 9 | 9 | 7 | 6 | 6 | 6 | 6 |
| Points | 0 | 0 | 0 | 0 | 3 | 6 | 7 | 8 | 8 | 8 | 8 | 11 | 11 | 14 | 15 | 15 | 18 | 21 | 22 | 25 | 28 | 31 | 34 | 37 | 38 | 41 | 44 | 44 | 47 | 50 | 53 | 53 | 53 | 53 | 53 | 53 | 56 | 59 | 59 | 60 | 63 | 66 | 69 | 72 | 75 | 78 |

Source: EFL
A = Away; H = Home; W = Win; D = Draw; L = Loss; P = Postponed
Notes:
- ^{1} Matchday 5 (vs. Peterborough United) was postponed due to international call-ups.
- ^{2} Matchday 11 (vs. Huddersfield Town) was postponed due to international call-ups.
- ^{3} Matchday 16 (vs. Mansfield Town) was postponed due to international call-ups.
- ^{4} Matchday 26 (vs. Birmingham City) was postponed due to FA Cup involvements.
- ^{5} Matchday 31 (vs. Wrexham) was postponed due to FA Cup involvements.
- ^{6} Matchday 38 (vs. Mansfield Town) was postponed due to international call-ups.

==== Matches ====
On 26 June, the League One fixtures were announced.

Win Draw Loss Fixtures

| 10 August 2024 1 | Leyton Orient | 1–2 | Bolton Wanderers | Leyton |
| 17:30 BST | Kelman 38', (yellow card) 57'; Galbraith (yellow card) 54'; Beckles (yellow card) 62'; Sweeney (yellow card) 74'; Happe (yellow card) 87' | Report | Charles 8'; Adeboyejo 75'; Baxter (yellow card) 90+5'; Osei-Tutu (yellow card) 90+7' | Stadium: Brisbane Road; Attendance: 7,835; Referee: Charles Breakspear |

| 17 August 2024 2 | Charlton Athletic | 1–0 | Leyton Orient | Charlton |
| 12:30 BST | Berry (yellow card) 25', (goal) 90+2' | Report | Clare (yellow card) 25'; James (yellow card) 47'; Agyei (yellow card) 65'; Sweeney (yellow card) 88' | Stadium: The Valley; Attendance: 15,126; Referee: Edward Duckworth |
Note: Fixture was initially scheduled for a 15:00 kick-off, but was moved for live Sky Sports broadcast.

| 24 August 2024 3 | Leyton Orient | 1–2 | Birmingham City | Leyton |
| 15:00 BST | Galbraith 14'; Obiero (yellow card) 45'; O'Neill (yellow card) 52' | Report | Anderson 7'; May 20'; Laird (yellow card) 23'; Klarer (yellow card) 50' | Stadium: Brisbane Road; Attendance: 8,005; Referee: Anthony Backhouse |

| 31 August 2024 4 | Shrewsbury Town | 3–0 | Leyton Orient | Shrewsbury |
| 15:00 BST | Castledine 22'; Bloxham 90+5'; O'Reilly (yellow card) 36'; Benning (yellow card) 64' | Report | Sweeney (yellow card) 62' | Stadium: New Meadow; Attendance: 5,602; Referee: Martin Coy |

| 14 September 2024 6 | Reading | 0–1 | Leyton Orient | Reading |
| 15:00 BST | | Report | James (yellow card) 9'; Kelman 27'; Galbraith (yellow card) 42'; Hemming (yellow card) 45+2'; Happe (yellow card) 48'; O'Neill (yellow card) 65'; Ball (yellow card) 90+6' | Stadium: Madejski Stadium; Attendance: 12,952; Referee: Declan Bourne |

| 21 September 2024 7 | Stockport County | 1–4 | Leyton Orient | Stockport |
| 15:00 BST | Diamond 50', (yellow card) 69' | Report | Galbraith 12', 17'; O'Neill (yellow card) 21'; James (yellow card) 28'; Agyei 57'; Clare 81' | Stadium: Edgeley Park; Attendance: 9,473; Referee: Adam Herczeg |

| 24 September 2024 5 | Leyton Orient | 2–2 | Peterborough United | Leyton |
| 19:45 BST | James 20'; Kelman 53'; Beckles (yellow card) 56'; Cooper (yellow card) 84' | Report | Poku 42'; Mothersille 45+1' (pen.); Curtis (yellow card) 73' | Stadium: Brisbane Road; Attendance: 6,416; Referee: Daniel Middleton |
Note: Fixture was originally scheduled for 7 September, but was postponed due to international call-ups.

| 28 September 2024 8 | Leyton Orient | 0–0 | Wrexham | Leyton |
| 15:00 BST | Beckles (yellow card) 51' | Report | O'Connell (yellow card) 19'; Dobson (yellow card) 28'; Cannon (yellow card) 45+2' | Stadium: Brisbane Road; Attendance: 8,705; Referee: Sunny Singh Gill |

| 1 October 2024 9 | Leyton Orient | 0–1 | Exeter City | Leyton |
| 19:45 BST | Ball (yellow card) 53'; Brown (yellow card) 77' | Report | A. Richards 40'; Niskanen (yellow card) 44'; McMillan (yellow card) 48'; Sweeney (yellow card) 89'; Watts (red card) 90+3' | Stadium: Brisbane Road; Attendance: 6,439; Referee: Ruebyn Ricardo |

| 5 October 2024 10 | Lincoln City | 2–1 | Leyton Orient | Lincoln |
| 15:00 GMT | Erhahon (yellow card) 19'; Makama 47'; Roughan (yellow card) 66'; Jefferies (yellow card) 67'; Draper 77'; Hamilton (yellow card) 90+2' | Report | Simpson (yellow card) 30'; Ball (yellow card) 50'; Agyei 80'; Pratley (yellow card) 90+5' | Stadium: Sincil Bank; Attendance: 9,511; Referee: Ross Joyce |

| 19 October 2024 12 | Northampton Town | 1–0 | Leyton Orient | Northampton |
| 15:00 BST | McGeehan 48'; Baldwin (yellow card) 55'; Pinnock (yellow card) 84'; Guthrie (yellow card) 90+3' | Report | Galbraith (yellow card) 10'; Agyei (yellow card) 35'; James (yellow card) 56' | Stadium: Sixfields Stadium; Attendance: 7,015; Referee: Oliver Mackey |

| 22 October 2024 13 | Leyton Orient | 1–0 | Rotherham United | Leyton |
| 19:45 BST | Kelman (yellow card) 45+2'; Happe 68'; James (yellow card) 75' | Report | Powell (yellow card) 61' | Stadium: Brisbane Road; Attendance: 6,314; Referee: Alex Chilowicz |

| 26 October 2024 14 | Wycombe Wanderers | 3–0 | Leyton Orient | High Wycombe |
| 15:00 BST | Onyedinma 5'; Udoh 45+5'; Humphreys 59' | Report | O'Neill (yellow card) 52'; Cooper (yellow card) 69' | Stadium: Adams Park; Attendance: 5,400; Referee: Stephen Martin |

| 9 November 2024 15 | Leyton Orient | 3–0 | Blackpool | Leyton |
| 15:00 GMT | Perkins 34', (yellow card) 65'; James (yellow card) 39', (goal) 76'; Galbraith (yellow card) 45+3'; Kelman 71'; Currie (yellow card) 78' | Report | Casey (yellow card) 81' | Stadium: Brisbane Road; Attendance: 8,527; Referee: Elliot Bell |

| 23 November 2024 17 | Stevenage | 0–0 | Leyton Orient | Stevenage |
| 12:30 GMT | Roberts (yellow card) 51'; Thompson (yellow card) 89' | Report | Warrington (yellow card) 25'; Pratley (yellow card) 31'; O'Neill (yellow card) 84' | Stadium: Broadhall Way; Attendance: 4,259; Referee: Ben Speedie |
Note: Fixture was initially scheduled for a 15:00 kick-off, but was moved for live Sky Sports broadcast.

| 26 November 2024 11 | Leyton Orient | 0–2 | Huddersfield Town | Leyton |
| 19:45 GMT | Beckles (yellow card) 63'; Keeley (yellow card) 65' | Report | Helik 26', (yellow card) 86'; Koroma (penalty missed) 64'; Marshall 90' | Stadium: Brisbane Road; Attendance: 7,541; Referee: Lee Swabey |
Note: Fixture was originally scheduled for 12 October, but was postponed due to international call-ups in the Huddersfield squad.

| 3 December 2024 18 | Leyton Orient | 3–0 | Bristol Rovers | Leyton |
| 19:45 GMT | Happe 17'; O'Neill 29'; Agyei 45+1'; Currie (yellow card) 78' | Report | Forbes (yellow card) 65' | Stadium: Brisbane Road; Attendance: 7,422; Referee: James Linington |

| 7 December 2024 19 | Wigan Athletic | 0–2 | Leyton Orient | Wigan |
| 12:30 GMT | McManaman (yellow card) 84' | Report | Ball (yellow card) 32'; Sweeney 41'; Jaiyesimi 90+2' | Stadium: Brick Community Stadium; Referee: Carl Brook |
Note: Fixture was initially scheduled for a 15:00 kick-off, but was moved for live Sky Sports broadcast.

| 14 December 2024 20 | Leyton Orient | 0–0 | Burton Albion | Leyton |
| 12:30 GMT | Ball (yellow card) 77' | Report | Gilligan (yellow card) 58'; Bennett (yellow card) 71' | Stadium: Brisbane Road; Attendance: 7,267; Referee: Martin Woods |
Note: Fixture was initially scheduled for a 15:00 kick-off, but was moved for live Sky Sports broadcast.

| 21 December 2024 21 | Barnsley | 0–4 | Leyton Orient | Barnsley |
| 15:00 GMT | | Report | Donley 6'; Currie (yellow card) 20'; Beckles 28'; Kelman 51'; Pratley (yellow card) 84'; O'Neill (yellow card) 88'; Perkins 90+3' | Stadium: Oakwell; Attendance: 11,373; Referee: Dale Baines |

| 26 December 2024 22 | Leyton Orient | 3–0 | Crawley Town | Leyton |
| 13:00 GMT | Kelman 33'; Agyei 50'; Beckles 55'; O'Neill (yellow card) 74'; Pratley (yellow card) 76' | Report | Wollacott (yellow card) 25'; Roles (yellow card) 45+1'; Camará (yellow card) 76' | Stadium: Brisbane Road; Referee: Sam Purkiss |
Note: Fixture was initially scheduled for a 15:00 kick-off, but was moved following an agreement between both sides.

| 29 December 2024 23 | Leyton Orient | 2–0 | Cambridge United | Leyton |
| 15:00 GMT | O'Neill 32'; Brown (yellow card) 46'; Donley 70'; Keeley (yellow card) 90+2' | Report | Kachunga (yellow card) 32'; Andrew (yellow card) 75' | Stadium: Brisbane Road; Attendance: 8,914; Referee: James Oldham |

| 1 January 2025 24 | Bristol Rovers | 2–3 | Leyton Orient | Horfield |
| 15:00 GMT | Martin 32', 74'; Sotiriou (yellow card) 38'; Taylor (yellow card) 78' | Report | Galbraith 9'; Keeley (yellow card) 31'; Jaiyesimi (yellow card) 36'; Donley 39'; Kelman 53'; Happe (yellow card) 77' | Stadium: Memorial Stadium; Attendance: 7,887; Referee: Alan Young |

| 4 January 2025 25 | Leyton Orient | 1–0 | Shrewsbury Town | Leyton |
| 15:00 GMT | Donley 63', (yellow card) 89' | Report | Hoole (yellow card) 78'; Winchester (yellow card) 90+1' | Stadium: Brisbane Road; Attendance: 7,552; Referee: Aaron Bannister |

| 18 January 2025 27 | Peterborough United | 0–0 | Leyton Orient | Peterborough |
| 12:30 GMT | Kyprianou (yellow card) 28' | Report | Obiero (yellow card) 6'; Cooper (yellow card) 87' | Stadium: London Road Stadium; Attendance: 8,235; Referee: Seb Stockbridge |
Note: Fixture was initially scheduled for a 15:00 kick-off, but was moved for live Sky Sports broadcasting.

| 25 January 2025 28 | Leyton Orient | 2–0 | Reading | Leyton |
| 15:00 GMT | Markanday 29'; Kelman 51', (yellow card) 84'; Donley (yellow card) 79' | Report | Craig (yellow card) 34'; Smith (yellow card) 43' | Stadium: Brisbane Road; Attendance: 8,774; Referee: Elliot Bell |

| 28 January 2025 29 | Exeter City | 2–6 | Leyton Orient | Exeter |
| 19:45 GMT | Alli 47', 56' | Report | Abdulai 5', 7', 64'; Clare 14'; Galbraith (yellow card) 26'; Markanday 34'; Donley 78'; Cooper (yellow card) 90+1' | Stadium: St James Park; Attendance: 5,022; Referee: Rubeyn Ricardo |

| 1 February 2025 30 | Leyton Orient | 0–1 | Stockport County | Leyton |
| 15:00 GMT | Cooper (yellow card) 56' | Report | Wootton 14'; Olaofe (yellow card) 60'; Knoyle (yellow card) 90+1' | Stadium: Brisbane Road; Attendance: 8,485; Referee: Matthew Russell |

| 11 February 2025 16 | Leyton Orient | 3–0 | Mansfield Town | Leyton |
| 19:45 GMT | Brown 6', (yellow card) 61'; Williams 17'; Galbraith 32'; Pratley (yellow card) 89' | Report | Kilgour (yellow card) 37'; Vickers (yellow card) 56'; Akins (yellow card) 73'; Boateng (yellow card) 88'; Macdonald (yellow card) 89'; Maris (yellow card) 90+2' | Stadium: Brisbane Road; Attendance: 6,527; Referee: Sunny Singh Gill |
Note: Fixture was originally scheduled for 16 November, but was postponed due to international call-ups in the Mansfield squad.

| 15 February 2025 32 | Leyton Orient | 3–2 | Lincoln City | Leyton |
| 15:00 GMT | Perkins 17', 28'; Kelman 90+2' | Report | Jefferies (yellow card) 20'; Montsma 45+7'; O'Connor (yellow card) 61'; Collins 75' | Stadium: Brisbane Road; Attendance: 7,967; Referee: Matt Corlett |

| 18 February 2025 31 | Wrexham | 1–2 | Leyton Orient | Wrexham |
| 19:45 GMT | Rathbone 15'; Dobson (yellow card) 45+2' | Report | Kelman 30'; Donley 50'; Abdulai (yellow card) 78'; Pratley (yellow card) 79' (yellow-red card) 87'; Sweeney (yellow card) 90+2' | Stadium: Racecourse Ground; Attendance: 11,703; Referee: Darren Drysdale |
Note: Fixture was initially scheduled for 8 February, but was moved due to FA Cup involvements.

| 22 February 2025 33 | Bolton Wanderers | 2–1 | Leyton Orient | Horwich |
| 15:00 GMT | McAtee 60'; Forrester (yellow card) 65'; Morley 75' (pen.) | Report | Kelman 40', (yellow card) 72'; Galbraith (yellow card) 66'; Keeley (yellow card) 75' | Stadium: Toughsheet Community Stadium; Attendance: 20,851; Referee: Sam Purkiss |

| 25 February 2025 26 | Birmingham City | 2–0 | Leyton Orient | Bordesley |
| 19:45 GMT | Gardner-Hickman 53', (yellow card) 54'; Laird 84' | Report | Currie (red card) 12'; Pratley (yellow card) 90' | Stadium: St Andrew's; Attendance: 26,857; Referee: Martin Woods |
Note: Fixture was initially scheduled for 11 January, but was postponed due to both clubs involvements in the FA Cup.

| 1 March 2025 34 | Leyton Orient | 1–2 | Charlton Athletic | Leyton |
| 15:00 GMT | Brown 50' | Report | Gillesphey 90+2'; Ramsay 90+7' | Stadium: Brisbane Road; Attendance: 8,942; Referee: Tom Reeves |

| 4 March 2025 35 | Rotherham United | 1–0 | Leyton Orient | Rotherham |
| 19:45 GMT | Sweeney 60' (o.g.); McWilliams (yellow card) 90+1' | Report | Abdulai (yellow card) 90+1' | Stadium: New York Stadium; Attendance: 8,106; Referee: Lewis Smith |

| 8 March 2025 36 | Leyton Orient | 1–2 | Northampton Town | Leyton |
| 15:00 GMT | Simpson (yellow card) 44'; Kelman 60' | Report | Roberts 11'; McGeehan 45' | Stadium: Brisbane Road; Attendance: 8,911; Referee: Alex Chilowicz |

| 15 March 2025 37 | Blackpool | 1–2 | Leyton Orient | Blackpool |
| 15:00 GMT | Carey 61'; Morgan (yellow card) 66' | Report | Kelman 29', 63'; Brown (yellow card) 64'; Agyei (yellow card) 90+3' | Stadium: Bloomfield Road; Referee: Thomas Kirk |

| 27 March 2025 39 | Leyton Orient | 1–0 | Stevenage | Leyton |
| 20:00 GMT | Kelman 12' | Report | | Stadium: Brisbane Road; Attendance: 7,305; Referee: Will Finnie |
Note: Fixture was initially scheduled for 29 March, but was moved for live Sky Sports broadcasting.

| 1 April 2025 40 | Burton Albion | 2–1 | Leyton Orient | Burton upon Trent |
| 19:45 BST | | Report | | Stadium: Pirelli Stadium |

| 5 April 2025 41 | Leyton Orient | 0–0 | Wigan Athletic | Leyton |
| 15:00 BST | James (yellow card) 53' | Report | Smith (yellow card) 51' | Stadium: Brisbane Road; Referee: Scott Tallis |

| 8 April 2025 38 | Mansfield Town | 2–3 | Leyton Orient | Mansfield |
| 19:45 BST | Dwyer 3'; Hewitt (yellow card) 25'; Cargill (yellow card) 60'; Maris 62'; Kilgour (yellow card) 78'; McLaughlin (yellow card) 80'; Boateng (yellow card) 90+6' | Report | Markanday 39'; Kelman 54', 69'; Brown (yellow card) 58'; Abdulai (yellow card) 78' | Stadium: Field Mill; Attendance: 6,980; Referee: Charles Breakspear |
Note: Fixture was initially scheduled for 22 March, but was postponed due to international call-ups.

| 12 April 2025 42 | Crawley Town | 1–3 | Leyton Orient | Crawley |
| 15:00 BST | Camará (yellow card) 30'; Quitirna 49' (pen.); Hutchinson (yellow card) 53' | Report | Brown (yellow card) 11'; Kelman 52', 53'; Beckles (yellow card) 69'; Ball (yellow card) 71'; Donley 90+2' | Stadium: Broadfield Stadium; Attendance: 4,793; Referee: Alan Young |

| 18 April 2025 43 | Leyton Orient | 4–3 | Barnsley | Leyton |
| 15:00 BST | Galbraith 51'; Williams (yellow card) 63'; Kelman 68'; Clare 72'; Beckles 74' | Report | Humphrys 11', 19'; Roberts (yellow card) 31'; Phillips (yellow card) 35'; Bland (yellow card) 40'; Keillor-Dunn 64' | Stadium: Brisbane Road; Attendance: 8,410; Referee: Leigh Doughty |

| 21 April 2025 44 | Cambridge United | 1–2 | Leyton Orient | Cambridge |
| 15:00 BST | | | | Stadium: Abbey Stadium; Attendance: 7,414; Referee: Anthony Backhouse |

| 26 April 2025 45 | Leyton Orient | 1–0 | Wycombe Wanderers | Leyton |
| 12:30 BST | Galbraith (yellow card) 28'; Williams 66'; Pratley (yellow card) 75' | Report | Lowry (yellow card) 60' | Stadium: Brisbane Road; Attendance: 8,935; Referee: Martin Coy |
Note: Fixture was initially scheduled for a 15:00 kick-off, but was moved for live Sky Sports broadcasting.

==== Play-offs ====
Leyton Orient finished 6th in the regular season, and were confirmed to play 3rd place Stockport County at home in the first leg and away in the second leg.

| 10 May 2025 First leg | Leyton Orient | 2–2 | Stockport County | Leyton |
| 12:30 BST | Kelman 30', 88' (pen.); Clare (yellow card) 52'; Williams (yellow card) 64'; Abdulai (yellow card) 70' | Report | Norwood 60' (pen.); Horsfall 65' | Stadium: Brisbane Road; Attendance: 8,571; Referee: Benjamin Speedie |

| 14 May 2025 Second leg | Stockport County | 1–1 (a.e.t.) (3–3 agg.) (1–4 p) | Leyton Orient | Stockport |
| 20:00 BST | Touray (yellow card) 26'; Olaofe 74'; Pye (yellow card) 90+4' | Report | O'Neill 3'; Donley (yellow card) 19'; Brown (yellow card) 54'; Beckles (yellow card) 58'; Abdulai (yellow card) 98'; Clare (yellow card) 113' | Stadium: Edgeley Park; Attendance: 10,592; Referee: James Bell |
| | Penalties |
| | Norwood (penalty scored); Diamond (penalty missed); Rydel (penalty missed) | | (penalty scored) James; (penalty scored) Clare; (penalty scored) Abdulai; (penalty scored) Galbraith |

| 25 May 2025 Final | Charlton Athletic | 1–0 | Leyton Orient | Wembley |
| 13:01 BST | Gillesphey 31'; Jones (yellow card) 90+2' | Report | | Stadium: Wembley Stadium; Attendance: 76,193; Referee: Andrew Kitchen |

=== FA Cup ===
Leyton Orient were drawn away to Boreham Wood in the first round, and then at home to Oldham Athletic in the second round, Derby County in the third round and Manchester City in the fourth round.

Win Draw Loss Fixtures

| 3 November 2024 First round | Boreham Wood | 2–2 (a.e.t.) (1–3 p) | Leyton Orient | Borehamwood |
| 14:00 GMT | Payne (yellow card) 22'; Marsh 69'; O'Connell 85' | Report | Perkins 12'; Agyei 49'; Sweeney (yellow card) 53' (yellow-red card) 102' | Stadium: Meadow Park; Attendance: 2,101; Referee: James Durkin |
| | Penalties |
| | Whelan (penalty missed); Bush (penalty missed); Hare (penalty scored); Dixon (penalty missed) | | (penalty scored) Jaiyesimi; (penalty missed) O'Neill; (penalty scored) Pratley; (penalty scored) Galbraith |

| 30 November 2024 Second round | Leyton Orient | 2–1 (a.e.t.) | Oldham Athletic | Leyton |
| 15:00 GMT | Ball (yellow card) 2'; Donley (yellow card) 85'; Keeley 90+9'; Agyei (penalty missed) 105+3', 120+1'; Brown (yellow card) 114' | Report | Monthé 47'; Norwood (yellow card) 52'; Ogle (yellow card) 55'; Fondop (yellow card) 66'; Hudson (yellow card) 69'; Kitching (yellow card) 75'; Caprice (yellow card) 85'; Garner (yellow card) 120+2' | Stadium: Brisbane Road; Attendance: 6,078; Referee: Alan Young |

| 14 January 2025 Third round | Leyton Orient | 1–1 (a.e.t.) (6–5 p) | Derby County | Leyton |
| 19:45 GMT | Kelman 20'; Pratley (yellow card) 43'; Donley (yellow card) 74'; Clare (yellow card) 90+2' (yellow-red card) 113' | Report | Brown 24'; Adams (yellow card) 84' | Stadium: Brisbane Road; Attendance: 8,279; Referee: Ben Speedie |
| | Penalties |
| | Donley (penalty scored); James (penalty scored); Brown (penalty scored); Cooper (penalty scored); Kelman (penalty scored); Obiero (penalty scored) | | (penalty scored) Collins; (penalty scored) Goudmijn; (penalty scored) Harness; (penalty scored) Jackson; (penalty scored) Barkhuizen; (penalty missed) Elder |
Note: Fixture was initially scheduled for 11 January, but was postponed and rearranged for three days later due to a frozen pitch.

| 8 February 2025 Fourth round | Leyton Orient | 1–2 | Manchester City | Leyton |
| 12:15 GMT | Ortega 16' (o.g.); Cooper (yellow card) 77'; Obiero (yellow card) 88' | Report | McAtee (yellow card) 42'; Khusanov 56'; De Bruyne 79' | Stadium: Brisbane Road; Attendance: 8,749; Referee: Darren Bond |

=== EFL Cup ===
On 27 June, the draw for the first round was made, with Leyton Orient being drawn at home against Newport County. In the second round, they were drawn away to Millwall. In the third round, Orient were drawn away to Brentford.

Win Draw Loss Fixtures

| 13 August 2024 First round | Leyton Orient | 4–1 | Newport County | Leyton |
| 19:30 BST | Agyei 1'; Jaiyesimi 45+7'; Cooper 51'; Warrington (yellow card) 60'; Kelman 74' | Report | Jameson (yellow card) 54'; Clarke 61' | Stadium: Brisbane Road; Attendance: 2,141; Referee: Craig Hicks |

| 27 August 2024 Second round | Millwall | 0–1 | Leyton Orient | Bermondsey |
| 19:45 BST | Wallace (yellow card) 26'; McNamara (yellow card) 58' | Report | Agyei 14'; Pratley (yellow card) 25'; Jaiyesimi (yellow card) 65'; Sweeney (yellow card) 78'; O'Neill (yellow card) 82' | Stadium: The Den; Attendance: 5,875; Referee: David Rock |

| 17 September 2024 Third round | Brentford | 3–1 | Leyton Orient | Brentford |
| 19:45 BST | Carvalho 17'; Damsgaard 26'; Nørgaard 45', (yellow card) 60' | Report | Cooper 11'; Donley (yellow card) 39'; Simpson (yellow card) 42' (yellow-red card) 69' | Stadium: Brentford Community Stadium; Attendance: 13,634; Referee: Lewis Smith |

=== EFL Trophy ===
In the group stage, Orient were drawn into Southern Group E alongside Colchester United, Milton Keynes Dons and Arsenal U21. They were then drawn away to Charlton Athletic in the round of 32 and at home to Stevenage in the round of 16.

==== Group stage ====
| Pos | Div | Team | Pld | W | PW | PL | L | GF | GA | GD | Pts | Qualification |
|---|---|---|---|---|---|---|---|---|---|---|---|---|
| 1 | L2 | Colchester United | 3 | 2 | 0 | 1 | 0 | 6 | 2 | +4 | 7 | Advance to Round 2 |
| 2 | L1 | Leyton Orient | 3 | 1 | 1 | 0 | 1 | 5 | 4 | +1 | 5 | Advance to Round 2 |
| 3 | ACA | Arsenal U21 | 3 | 1 | 0 | 1 | 1 | 4 | 6 | −2 | 4 | |
| 4 | L2 | Milton Keynes Dons | 3 | 0 | 1 | 0 | 2 | 4 | 7 | −3 | 2 | |

Source: EFL

Win Draw Loss Fixtures

| 3 September 2024 Group stage | Leyton Orient | 1–2 | Arsenal U21 | Leyton |
| 19:00 BST | Happe 26'; Simpson (yellow card) 36'; Donley (yellow card) 66'; Agyei (penalty missed) 90' | Report | Robinson 3'; Kabia 55'; Rosiak (yellow card) 86'; Gower (yellow card) 90' | Stadium: Brisbane Road; Attendance: 2,128; Referee: Stephen Parkinson |

| 8 October 2024 Group stage | Leyton Orient | 1–1 (4–2 p) | Colchester United | Leyton |
| 19:00 BST | Obiero 30'; Simpson (yellow card) 82' | Report | Goodliffe 79'; Tovide (yellow card) 81'; Hopper (yellow card) 82'; Hunt (yellow card) 89'; Egbo (yellow card) 90+2' | Stadium: Brisbane Road; Attendance: 1,483; Referee: Abigail Byrne |
| | Penalties |
| | Agyei (penalty scored); O'Neill (penalty scored); Simpson (penalty scored); Brown (penalty missed); Kelman (penalty scored) | | (penalty scored) Payne; (penalty scored) Scully; (penalty missed) Read; (penalty missed) Tovide |

| 12 November 2024 Group stage | Milton Keynes Dons | 1–3 | Leyton Orient | Milton Keynes |
| 19:00 BST | Hendry (yellow card) 23', (goal) 33'; Lewington (yellow card) 38'; Wood (yellow card) 79' | Report | Kelman 6'; Perkins 21'; James (yellow card) 25'; Obiero (yellow card) 45'; Happe (yellow card) 49'; Cooper (yellow card) 76'; Agyei 90+3' | Stadium: Stadium MK; Attendance: 1,127; Referee: Thomas Parsons |

==== Knockout stages ====
| 10 December 2024 Round of 32 | Charlton Athletic | 0–2 | Leyton Orient | Charlton |
| 19:00 GMT | Edmonds-Green (yellow card) 88' | Report | Kelman 90+3'; Agyei 90+5' | Stadium: The Valley; Attendance: 1,336; Referee: Stephen Parkinson |

| 21 January 2025 Round of 16 | Leyton Orient | 0–1 | Stevenage | Leyton |
| 19:00 GMT | Clare (yellow card) 53' | Report | Cooper 25' (o.g.); Appéré (yellow card) 63'; King (yellow card) 72'; Sweeney (yellow card) 90+11' | Stadium: Gaughan Group Stadium; Referee: Carl Brook |
Note: Fixture was initially scheduled for 14 January, but was pushed back a week due to the FA Cup rearrangement versus Derby County.

== Statistics ==
=== Appearances and goals ===
As of match played 25 May 2025

Players with no appearances are not included on the list
Italics indicate a loaned in player

| No. | Pos | Nat | Player | Total | | League One | | FA Cup | | EFL Cup | | EFL Trophy | | League One play-offs | |
| No. | Pos | Nat | Player | Apps | Goals | Apps | Goals | Apps | Goals | Apps | Goals | Apps | Goals | Apps | Goals |
|---|---|---|---|---|---|---|---|---|---|---|---|---|---|---|---|
| 2 | DF | (Wales) WAL | Tom James | 33 | 2 | 16+5 | 2 | 2+1 | 0 | 3+0 | 0 | 3+0 | 0 | 0+3 | 0 |
| 3 | DF | (England) ENG | Jayden Sweeney | 28 | 1 | 9+10 | 1 | 1+2 | 0 | 3+0 | 0 | 2+1 | 0 | 0+0 | 0 |
| 4 | DF | (England) ENG | Jack Simpson | 27 | 0 | 11+7 | 0 | 4+0 | 0 | 1+0 | 0 | 4+0 | 0 | 0+0 | 0 |
| 5 | DF | (England) ENG | Dan Happe | 29 | 3 | 23+1 | 2 | 1+1 | 0 | 0+0 | 0 | 2+0 | 1 | 0+1 | 0 |
| 6 | DF | (Wales) WAL | Brandon Cooper | 43 | 2 | 16+14 | 0 | 2+2 | 0 | 3+0 | 2 | 4+0 | 0 | 1+1 | 0 |
| 7 | FW | (England) ENG | Dan Agyei | 53 | 13 | 30+10 | 7 | 2+1 | 2 | 2+1 | 2 | 1+3 | 2 | 3+0 | 0 |
| 8 | MF | (England) ENG | Jordan Brown | 54 | 2 | 37+6 | 2 | 1+3 | 0 | 0+2 | 0 | 1+2 | 0 | 2+0 | 0 |
| 9 | MF | (England) ENG | Randell Williams | 17 | 3 | 12+2 | 3 | 0+0 | 0 | 0+0 | 0 | 0+0 | 0 | 1+2 | 0 |
| 10 | FW | (England) ENG | Jordan Graham | 10 | 0 | 0+8 | 0 | 0+0 | 0 | 0+0 | 0 | 2+0 | 0 | 0+0 | 0 |
| 12 | DF | (England) ENG | Jack Currie | 44 | 0 | 33+2 | 0 | 2+0 | 0 | 0+0 | 0 | 3+1 | 0 | 2+1 | 0 |
| 13 | GK | (England) ENG | Sam Howes | 1 | 0 | 0+0 | 0 | 0+0 | 0 | 0+0 | 0 | 1+0 | 0 | 0+0 | 0 |
| 15 | MF | (England) ENG | Dominic Ball | 37 | 0 | 11+19 | 0 | 2+1 | 0 | 1+0 | 0 | 1+0 | 0 | 0+2 | 0 |
| 16 | MF | (England) ENG | Lewis Warrington | 12 | 0 | 3+4 | 0 | 0+0 | 0 | 3+0 | 0 | 2+0 | 0 | 0+0 | 0 |
| 17 | FW | (England) ENG | Jamie Donley | 52 | 8 | 31+8 | 8 | 3+1 | 0 | 1+1 | 0 | 2+2 | 0 | 3+0 | 0 |
| 18 | MF | (England) ENG | Darren Pratley | 43 | 0 | 21+10 | 0 | 2+2 | 0 | 1+2 | 0 | 3+2 | 0 | 0+0 | 0 |
| 19 | DF | (Grenada) GRN | Omar Beckles | 42 | 3 | 28+3 | 3 | 2+1 | 0 | 1+2 | 0 | 0+2 | 0 | 3+0 | 0 |
| 20 | FW | (England) ENG | Sonny Perkins | 41 | 6 | 10+19 | 4 | 3+1 | 1 | 3+0 | 0 | 5+0 | 1 | 0+0 | 0 |
| 21 | FW | (Republic of Ireland) IRL | Ollie O'Neill | 35 | 3 | 20+5 | 2 | 2+0 | 0 | 0+2 | 0 | 0+3 | 0 | 2+1 | 1 |
| 22 | MF | (Northern Ireland) NIR | Ethan Galbraith | 50 | 6 | 36+2 | 6 | 4+0 | 0 | 1+2 | 0 | 2+0 | 0 | 3+0 | 0 |
| 23 | FW | (United States) USA | Charlie Kelman | 61 | 27 | 37+9 | 21 | 3+1 | 1 | 0+3 | 1 | 3+2 | 2 | 3+0 | 2 |
| 24 | GK | (Republic of Ireland) IRL | Josh Keeley | 45 | 1 | 36+0 | 0 | 4+0 | 1 | 1+0 | 0 | 1+0 | 0 | 3+0 | 0 |
| 27 | FW | (England) ENG | Diallang Jaiyesimi | 40 | 2 | 4+24 | 1 | 3+1 | 0 | 3+0 | 1 | 4+1 | 0 | 0+0 | 0 |
| 28 | DF | (England) ENG | Sean Clare | 36 | 3 | 19+10 | 3 | 1+0 | 0 | 1+0 | 0 | 1+1 | 0 | 3+0 | 0 |
| 29 | MF | (Kenya) KEN | Zech Obiero | 21 | 1 | 4+6 | 0 | 0+3 | 0 | 3+0 | 0 | 5+0 | 1 | 0+0 | 0 |
| 31 | MF | (Jamaica) JAM | Makai Welch | 1 | 0 | 0+0 | 0 | 0+0 | 0 | 0+0 | 0 | 0+1 | 0 | 0+0 | 0 |
| 44 | FW | (England) ENG | Dilan Markanday | 17 | 3 | 13+3 | 3 | 0+0 | 0 | 0+0 | 0 | 0+0 | 0 | 0+1 | 0 |
| 45 | DF | (England) ENG | Rarmani Edmonds-Green | 20 | 0 | 16+1 | 0 | 0+0 | 0 | 0+0 | 0 | 0+0 | 0 | 3+0 | 0 |
| 47 | DF | (Scotland) SCO | Azeem Abdulai | 24 | 4 | 11+10 | 4 | 0+0 | 0 | 0+0 | 0 | 0+0 | 0 | 1+2 | 0 |
Player(s) who featured whilst on loan but returned to parent club during the season:
| 1 | GK | (England) ENG | Zach Hemming | 15 | 0 | 10+0 | 0 | 0+0 | 0 | 2+0 | 0 | 3+0 | 0 | 0+0 | 0 |
