= Ethan Galbraith =

Northern Irish footballer (born 2001)

- Galbraith with Leyton Orient in 2025

Personal information
- Full name: Ethan Stuart William Galbraith
- Date of birth: 11 May 2001 (age 25)
- Place of birth: Glengormley, Northern Ireland
- Height: 5 ft 9 in (1.75 m)
- Position: Central midfielder

Team information
- Current team: Stoke City
- Number: 8

Youth career
- 2007–2012: Carnmoney Colts
- 2012–2014: Ballyclare Comrades
- 2014–2015: Glentoran
- 2015–2016: Crusaders
- 2016–2017: Linfield
- 2017–2019: Manchester United

Senior career*
Years	Team	Apps	(Gls)
2019–2023	Manchester United	0	(0)
2021–2022	→ Doncaster Rovers (loan)	33	(1)
2022–2023	→ Salford City (loan)	32	(4)
2023–2025	Leyton Orient	78	(10)
2025–2026	Swansea City	39	(3)
2026–	Stoke City	14	(3)

International career^{‡}
2016–2017	Northern Ireland U17	5	(0)
2018	Northern Ireland U19	3	(0)
2019–2022	Northern Ireland U21	19	(1)
2019–	Northern Ireland	21	(0)
- * Club domestic league appearances and goals as of 17:48, 7 November 2026 (UTC) ‡ National team caps and goals as of 00:15, 18 November 2026 (UTC)

Ethan Stuart William Galbraith (born 11 May 2001) is a Northern Irish professional footballer who plays as a central midfielder for EFL Championship club Stoke City and the Northern Ireland national team.

Galbraith left Linfield to join the Manchester United academy in 2017. He made his first-team debut for United in a UEFA Europa League match against Astana in November 2019. He spent the 2021–22 season on loan at Doncaster Rovers and the 2022–23 season at Salford City. In June 2023 he joined Leyton Orient where he spent two seasons before signing for EFL Championship side Swansea City in July 2025. After a season in South Wales, Galbraith joined Stoke City in July 2026.

Galbraith represented Northern Ireland at under-17, under-19, under-21 levels. He made his senior international debut at the age of 18, against Luxembourg, in September 2019.

== Club career ==
=== Manchester United ===
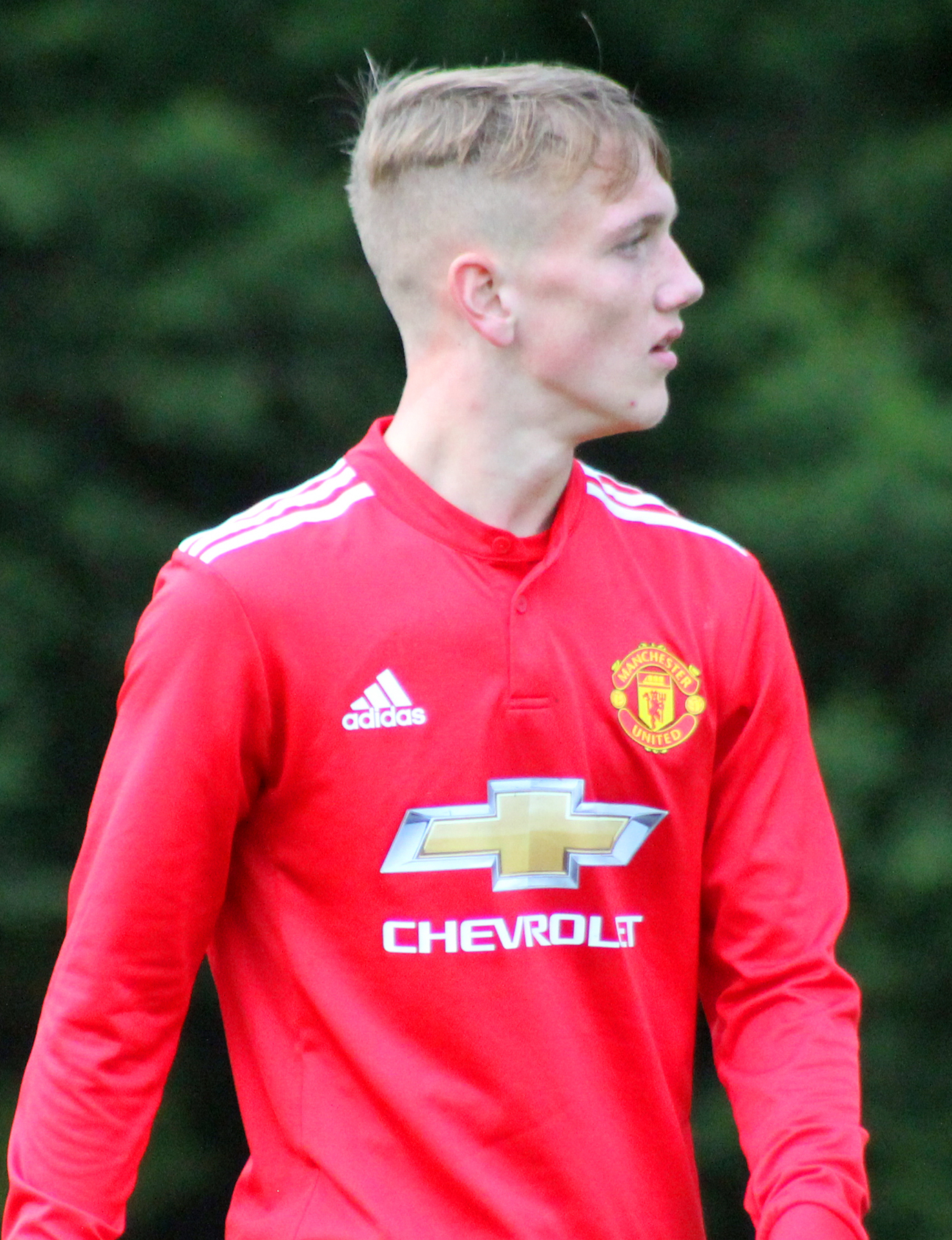
Galbraith playing for Manchester United U18s in 2017

Galbraith was born in Glengormley, Northern Ireland and attended Glengormley High School. He played youth football for Carnmoney Colts, Ballyclare Comrades, Glentoran, Crusaders and Linfield in his youth. In 2017, he left Linfield and joined the youth academy of English club Manchester United on a one-year scholarship, before signing a two-year professional contract with the club in May 2018. On 28 November 2019, he made his senior debut in a UEFA Europa League match against Kazakh team Astana, coming on as an 89th-minute substitute for Tahith Chong. In October 2020, Galbraith signed a new three-year contract with United, with the option of an extra year.

In August 2021 he joined League One club Doncaster Rovers on loan for the 2021–22 season. On 26 October, Galbraith scored his first goal for Doncaster, scoring the equaliser in a 1–1 draw with Cambridge United with a strike from 30 yards. Manager Richie Wellens praised his performances, predicting that he would go on to have a long and successful career. Galbraith described his spell at Doncaster as a "great experience" despite the team being relegated. On 1 September 2022, Galbraith joined League Two side Salford City on loan for the 2022–23 season, under the management of former United youth coach Neil Wood. He scored his first goal for the club on 8 October in a 1–0 win against Northampton Town, Salford's first win against their opponents. Galbraith played 38 times for the Ammies helping them to reach the League Two play-offs where they lost to Stockport County.

Galbraith left Manchester United at the end of 2022–23 season.

=== Leyton Orient ===
On 29 June 2023, Galbraith signed for Leyton Orient, re-joining his former manager, Richie Wellens. In his first season at Brisbane Road, Galbraith was a key player, making 45 appearances scoring five goals and won the club's Player of the Year award for 2023–24. In 2024–25 Galbraith played 51 times for Orient as they reached the EFL League One play-offs where they faced Stockport County, Galbraith scoring the winning penalty after a 3–3 draw on aggregate. In the final Leyton Orient were beaten 1–0 by Charlton Athletic.

=== Swansea City ===
On 4 July 2025, Galbraith signed for Swansea City for an undisclosed fee and on a three-year contract, with an option for an additional 12 months. He made his debut on 9 August 2025, starting in a 0–1 loss against Middlesbrough. He scored his first goal for the club in a 3–1 EFL Cup first round win over Crawley Town, scoring the third in stoppage time via a volley from outside of the box.

=== Stoke City ===
On 1 July 2026, Galbraith joined Stoke City for an undisclosed fee on a four-year contract.

== International career ==
Galbraith made five appearances for Northern Ireland at under-17 level and three appearances at under-19 level. He has made 19 appearances and scored one goal at under-21 level. Galbraith made his senior international debut at the age of 18 on 5 September 2019, in a friendly match against Luxembourg which finished as a 1–0 win.

== Playing style ==
Northern Ireland manager Ian Baraclough described Galbraith as the country's version of Spanish international midfielders Xavi and Andrés Iniesta. Neil Wood has described him as technically gifted, and as a player who "can pick a pass and has all the different varieties of delivery".

== Career statistics ==
=== Club ===
As of match played 7 November 2026

Appearances and goals by club, season and competition
Club	Season	League			FA Cup		League Cup		Europe		Other		Total	
Club	Season	Division	Apps	Goals	Apps	Goals	Apps	Goals	Apps	Goals	Apps	Goals	Apps	Goals
Manchester United U21	2019–20	—	—		—		—		—		3 (Note: Appearance(s) in the EFL Trophy)	1	3	1
Manchester United U21	2020–21	—	—		—		—		—		1	0	1	0
Manchester United U21	Total		0	0	0	0	0	0	0	0	4	1	4	1
Manchester United	2019–20	Premier League	0	0	0	0	0	0	1 (Note: Appearance in the UEFA Europa League)	0	—		1	0
Manchester United	2020–21	Premier League	0	0	0	0	0	0	0	0	—		0	0
Manchester United	2021–22	Premier League	0	0	0	0	0	0	0	0	—		0	0
Manchester United	2022–23	Premier League	0	0	0	0	0	0	0	0	—		0	0
Manchester United	Total		0	0	0	0	0	0	1	0	0	0	1	0
Doncaster Rovers (loan)	2021–22	League One	33	1	1	0	0	0	—		2	0	36	1
Salford City (loan)	2022–23	League Two	32	4	2	0	0	0	—		4	0	38	4
Leyton Orient	2023–24	League One	39	4	2	0	1	0	—		3	1	45	5
Leyton Orient	2024–25	League One	39	6	4	0	3	0	—		5 (Note: Two appearances in the EFL Trophy and three appearances in the League One play-offs)	0	51	6
Leyton Orient	Total		78	10	6	0	4	0	0	0	8	1	96	11
Swansea City	2025–26	Championship	39	3	1	0	4	1	—		—		44	4
Stoke City	2026–27	Championship	14	3	0	0	2	0	—		—		16	3
Career total			196	21	10	0	10	1	1	0	18	2	235	24

=== International ===
As of match played 17 November 2026

Appearances and goals by national team and year
National team	Year	Apps	Goals
Northern Ireland	2019	1	0
Northern Ireland	2020	1	0
Northern Ireland	2024	2	0
Northern Ireland	2025	8	0
Northern Ireland	2026	9	0
Total		21	0
