= Diallang Jaiyesimi =

English footballer (born 1998)

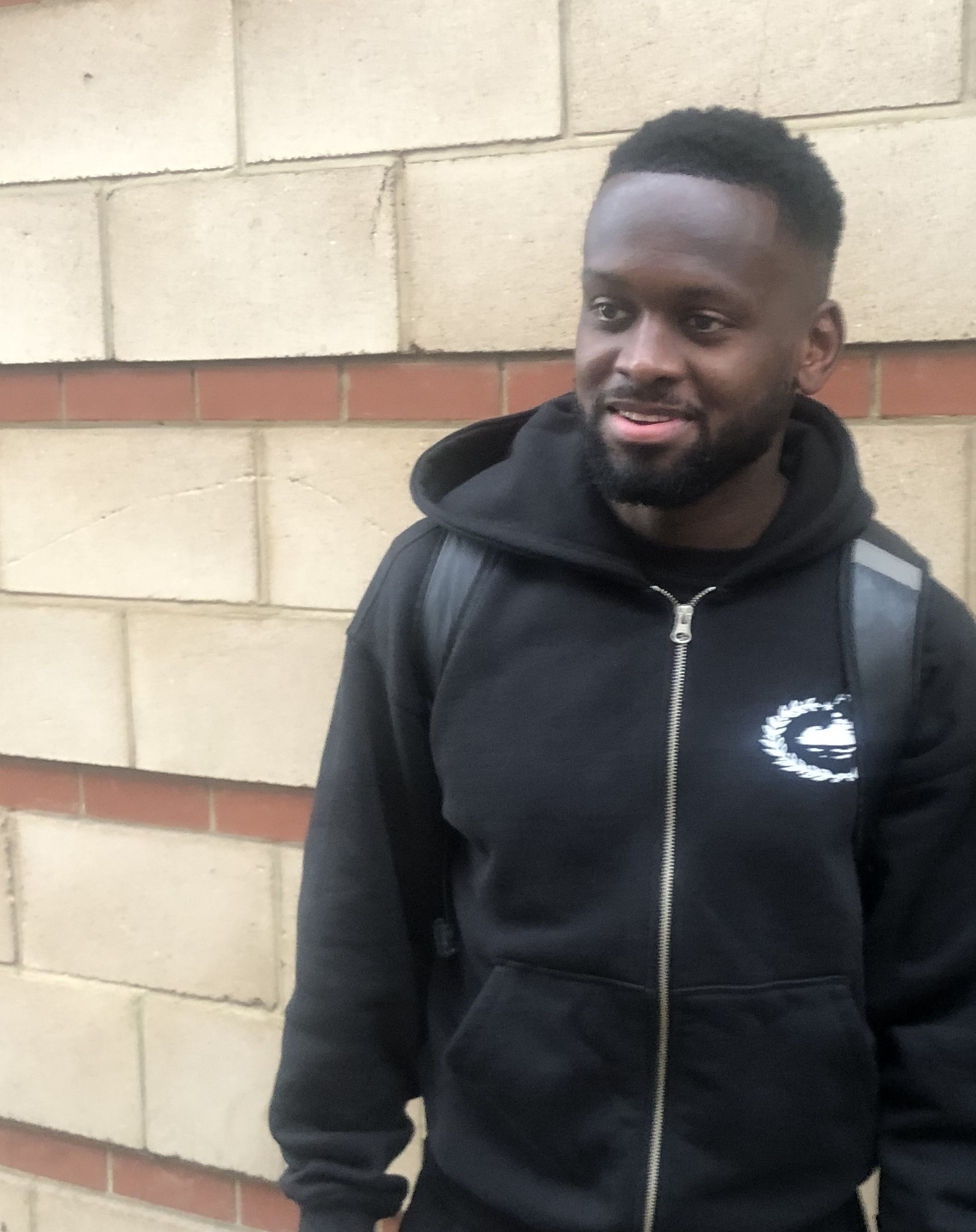
- Jaiyesimi in 2024.

Personal information
- Full name: Diallang Jaiyesimi
- Date of birth: 7 May 1998 (age 28)
- Place of birth: Southwark, England
- Height: 1.78 m (5 ft 10 in)
- Position: Winger

Youth career
- 2012–2015: Aspire Academy

Senior career*
Years	Team	Apps	(Gls)
2015–2016	Dulwich Hamlet	1	(0)
2016–2020	Norwich City	0	(0)
2017–2018	→ Grimsby Town (loan)	29	(0)
2018–2019	→ Yeovil Town (loan)	9	(2)
2019–2020	→ Swindon Town (loan)	21	(4)
2020–2021	Swindon Town	18	(4)
2021–2024	Charlton Athletic	55	(3)
2023	→ AFC Wimbledon (loan)	11	(1)
2023–2024	→ St Johnstone (loan)	16	(1)
2024–2026	Leyton Orient	36	(1)
2026	→ Barnet (loan)	15	(1)
- * Club domestic league appearances and goals as of 18:38, 2 May 2026 (UTC)

Diallang Jaiyesimi (born 7 May 1998) is an English professional footballer who last played as a winger for EFL League One side Leyton Orient.

At the age of 14, Jaiyesimi started his career with the Aspire Academy, later playing for Dulwich Hamlet, which he captained the U18s. Having been on trial with Norwich City, he then signed his first professional contract with the club in January 2016, playing in their U23 team, before taking the opportunity of a season long loan with Grimsby Town in League Two.

== Club career ==
=== Early career ===
He came through the Aspire Academy run by Dulwich Hamlet, having joined at the age of 14. He was captain of the Dulwich Hamlet Under-18s, and also made five first team appearances, making his debut in a 2–0 victory in the Alan Turvey Trophy over Thamesmead Town in August 2015.

=== Norwich City ===
Jaiyesimi was scouted by professional clubs, he played four times on trial with Norwich's U18s and featured in wins over Leicester City Academy and West Ham United Academy, scoring against Arsenal Academy in November. In January 2016, he signed a two-and-a-half-year contract with the Norwich City. During the 2016–17 season, Jaiyesimi made three appearances coming off the bench in the Football League Trophy, as part of the Norwich City Under-23s team. Jaiyesimi was Norwich City Under-23s' joint top scorer that season with eight goals in 33 appearances, finding the net against Wolves, Aston Villa, Everton, Fulham and Newcastle United U23s.

Jaiyesimi went on loan for the 2017–18 season on 9 August 2017 to League Two side Grimsby Town. He made his professional debut with Grimsby on 12 August 2017, in their 2–0 defeat at home to Coventry City, coming on as a 72nd-minute substitute.

On 20 June 2018, Jaiyesimi agreed to join League Two side Yeovil Town on loan until the end of the 2018–19 season. In October 2018, Jaiyesimi was ruled out for the remainder of the 2018–19 season with a serious knee injury, and returned to his parent club during the January transfer window.

On 2 August 2019 he moved on loan to Swindon Town.

=== Swindon Town ===
Following his release from Norwich at the end of the 2019–20 season, Jaiyesimi re-joined Swindon Town on a permanent three-year deal on 27 July 2020.

=== Charlton Athletic ===
On 1 February 2021, Jaiyesimi joined League One side Charlton Athletic on a three-and-a-half-year deal for an undisclosed fee. He scored his first goal for Charlton in a 2–2 draw with AFC Wimbledon on 20 March 2021.

On 3 May 2024, it was confirmed that Jaiyesimi would leave Charlton Athletic when his contract expired.

==== AFC Wimbledon (loan) ====
On 31 January 2023, Jaiyesimi joined AFC Wimbledon on loan until the end of the 2022–23 season. He scored his first goal for Wimbledon on 18 February 2023 in a 2–2 draw with Hartlepool United.

On 1 September 2023, Jaiyesimi joined St Johnstone on a season-long loan. He was sent off during a match against Rangers on 20 December, later suffering racist abuse on social media.

=== Leyton Orient ===
On 4 July 2024, Jaiyesimi joined Leyton Orient on a two-year deal. On 13 August, Diallang scored his first goal for the club on his first start in a 4–1 EFL Cup win at home to Newport County.

In January 2026 he signed on loan for Barnet.

He was released by Orient at the end of the 2025–26 season.

== International career ==
Despite being born in England, Jaiyesimi was selected for Nigeria U20, Team Nigeria UK boss said: "Jaiyesimi is a Nigerian and he has been approached to play for Nigeria, he is available to play for Nigeria if called upon."

== Style of play ==
Jaiyesimi can play on the left or right and can play the number 10 position.

Jaiyesimi can play as a winger, striker or as an attacking midfielder.

== Personal life ==
Jaiyesimi is eligible to play for Nigeria, as he is of Nigerian descent.

== Career statistics ==
As of end of 2025–26 season

Appearances and goals by club, season and competition
Club	Season	League			FA Cup		League Cup		Other		Total	
Club	Season	Division	Apps	Goals	Apps	Goals	Apps	Goals	Apps	Goals	Apps	Goals
Dulwich Hamlet	2015–16	Isthmian League Premier Division	1	0	1	0	—		3 (Note: Appearances in the Alan Turvey Trophy.)	0	5	0
Norwich City	2015–16	Premier League	0	0	0	0	0	0	0	0	0	0
Norwich City	2016–17	Championship	0	0	0	0	0	0	3 (Note: Appearances in the EFL Trophy.)	0	3	0
Norwich City	2017–18	Championship	0	0	0	0	0	0	0	0	0	0
Norwich City	2018–19	Championship	0	0	0	0	0	0	0	0	0	0
Norwich City	2019–20	Premier League	0	0	0	0	0	0	0	0	0	0
Norwich City	Total		0	0	0	0	0	0	3	0	3	0
Grimsby Town (loan)	2017–18	League Two	29	0	1	0	1	0	3	1	34	1
Yeovil Town (loan)	2018–19	League Two	9	2	0	0	1	0	1	0	11	2
Swindon Town (loan)	2019–20	League Two	21	4	2	0	0	0	0	0	23	4
Swindon Town	2020–21	League One	18	4	0	0	1	0	2	0	21	4
Charlton Athletic	2020–21	League One	14	1	0	0	0	0	0	0	14	1
Charlton Athletic	2021–22	League One	33	2	2	0	0	0	1	0	36	2
Charlton Athletic	2022–23	League One	7	0	2	0	2	1	2	0	13	1
Charlton Athletic	2023–24	League One	1	0	0	0	0	0	0	0	1	0
Charlton Athletic	Total		55	3	4	0	2	1	3	0	64	4
AFC Wimbledon (loan)	2022–23	League Two	11	1	0	0	0	0	0	0	11	1
St Johnstone (loan)	2023–24	Scottish Premiership	16	1	1	0	0	0	0	0	17	1
Leyton Orient	2024–25	League One	28	1	4	0	3	1	5	0	40	2
Leyton Orient	2025–26	League One	8	0	0	0	1	0	3	1	12	1
Leyton Orient	Total		36	1	4	0	4	1	8	1	52	3
Barnet (loan)	2025–26	League Two	15	1	0	0	0	0	0	0	15	1
Career total			211	17	13	0	9	2	23	2	256	21

== Honours ==
Swindon Town

- EFL League Two: 2019–20
