= Jamie Donley =

Northern Irish footballer (born 2005)

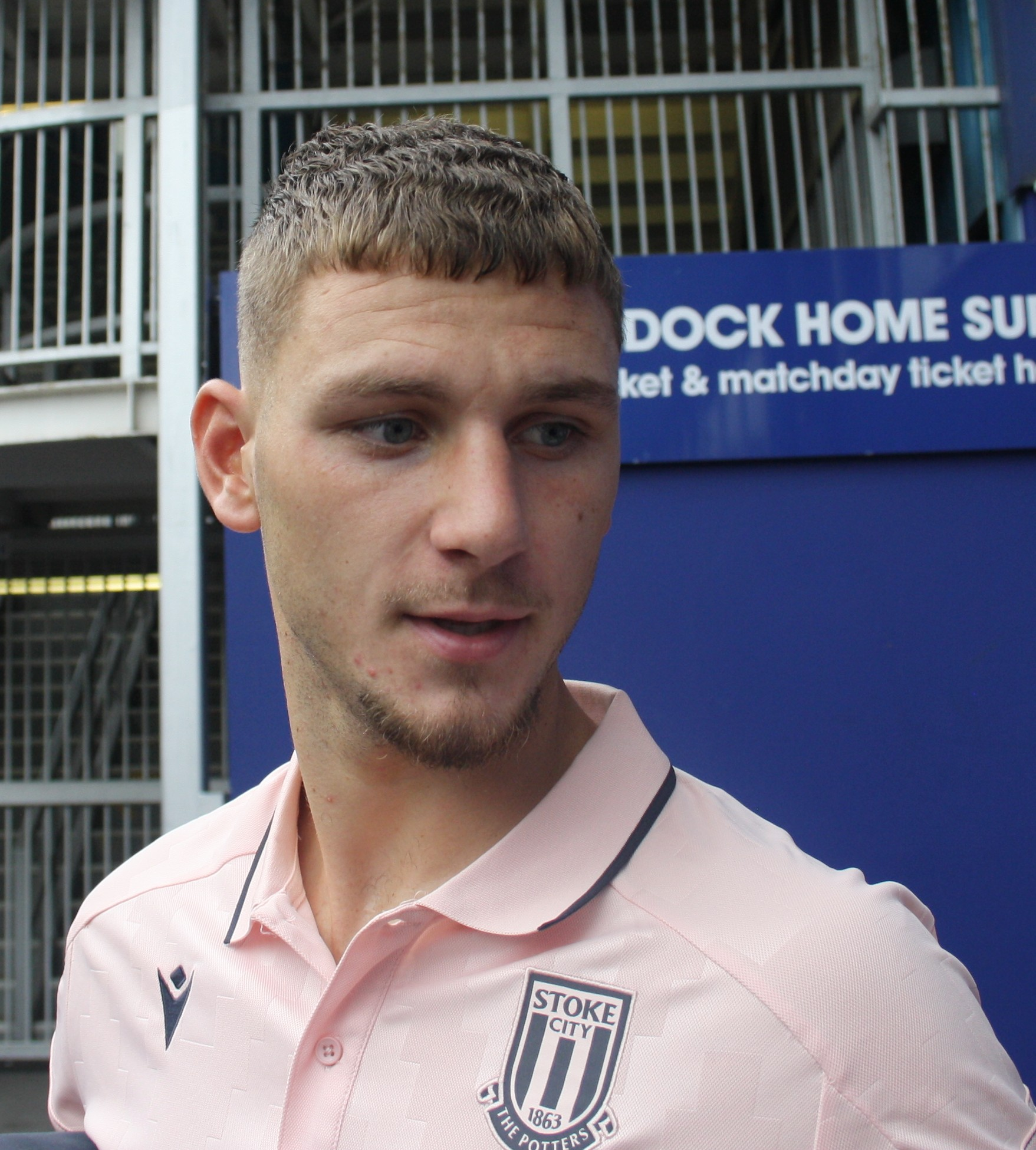
- Donley with Stoke City in 2025

Personal information
- Full name: Jamie Paul Donley
- Date of birth: 3 January 2005 (age 21)
- Place of birth: Antrim, Northern Ireland
- Height: 1.83 m (6 ft 0 in)
- Position: Attacking midfielder

Team information
- Current team: Luton Town (on loan from Tottenham Hotspur)
- Number: 10

Youth career
- 2011–2013: Colchester Villa Youth FC
- 2013–2023: Tottenham Hotspur

Senior career*
Years	Team	Apps	(Gls)
2023–	Tottenham Hotspur	3	(0)
2024–2025	→ Leyton Orient (loan)	39	(8)
2025–2026	→ Stoke City (loan)	4	(0)
2026	→ Oxford United (loan)	13	(1)
2026–	→ Luton Town (loan)	13	(4)

International career^{‡}
2019	England U15	1	(0)
2021	England U16	1	(0)
2021–2022	England U17	5	(2)
2022	England U18	2	(0)
2022	Northern Ireland U19	2	(2)
2023–2024	England U19	7	(5)
2025	Northern Ireland U21	1	(0)
2025–	Northern Ireland	15	(2)
- * Club domestic league appearances and goals as of 18:58, 21 November 2026 (UTC) ‡ National team caps and goals as of 15 November 2026

Jamie Paul Donley (born 3 January 2005) is a Northern Irish professional footballer who plays as a midfielder for EFL League One club Luton Town, on loan from Premier League club Tottenham Hotspur and the Northern Ireland national team.

== Club career ==
=== Tottenham Hotspur ===
Donley was born on 3 January 2005, in Antrim. He grew up in Colchester, and attended the Gilberd School. He began his football career in the youth academy of Colchester Villa Youth Football Club, before moving to Tottenham Hotspur in 2013, at the age of eight. Donley made his debut for Tottenham Under-18s team in November 2020 against Leicester City, scoring a goal. During the 2020–21 season, he netted three goals in 10 appearances in the Under-18 Premier League. The following season, Donley secured a double victory in the Under-17 and Under-18 Premier League Cup, appearing in both finals. On 12 January 2022 he signed his first professional contract with Tottenham.

On 19 March 2023, he extended his contract with Tottenham until 2027. His performances at the start of the 2023–24 PL2 Season saw him named the October Player of the Month, in addition to a nomination for the August award. Donley's senior debut occurred on 3 December 2023 in the 3–3 away draw against Manchester City in the Premier League, when he came on as a substitute for Brennan Johnson in the sixth minute of added time at the end of the second half.

==== Leyton Orient (loan) ====
On 16 August 2024, Donley joined Leyton Orient on loan until the end of the season. He scored his first goal for Orient on 21 December 2024. He kept his goalscoring form going into January 2025, three goals and three assists seeing him named EFL Young Player of the Month as Orient climbed into play-off contention.

On 8 February 2025, during an FA Cup 4th round tie with English champions and last years runners up Manchester City, Donley opened the scoring in spectacular fashion. As Sonny Perkins dispossessed City's new signing Nico González, Donley struck the ball fifty yards out from goal, and it bounced off the underside of the crossbar before hitting City goalkeeper Stefan Ortega on the back and falling into the net. Though it ultimately went down as an own goal, Donley received praise from fans, BBC pundits Martin Keown and Chris Sutton, and City manager Pep Guardiola, who said afterwards, "When you concede this goal, you just congratulate Donley. He's an incredible left-footed player and he made a fantastic goal." Orient went on to lose the match 2–1, but Donley was given the Man of the Match award.

Donley played 52 times for Leyton Orient, scoring eight goals, helping them to reach the League One play-off final, where they lost 1–0 to Charlton Athletic. His performances for Orient in 2024–25 saw him win the player of the year award.

==== Stoke City (loan) ====
On 6 August 2025, Donley joined Stoke City on a season-long loan deal. After making only six appearances for Stoke, Donley was recalled by Tottenham on 1 January 2026.

==== Oxford United (loan) ====
On 2 January 2026, Donley joined Oxford United on loan until the end of the season, with an option to make the deal permanent.

== International career ==
Donley was born in Northern Ireland to a Northern Irish father and an English mother. He officially represented England at youth level, having previously represented Northern Ireland in younger age groups unofficially. On 17 March 2025, his request to switch international allegiance to Northern Ireland was approved by FIFA. Four days later, he made his debut for the senior team in a friendly match against Switzerland.

== Style of play ==
Donley has been described as "the new Harry Kane" and as a "left-footed number nine, noted for his tenacity and finishing ability, who can drop off and show a good range of passing".

== Career statistics ==
=== Club ===
As of match played 21 November 2026

Appearances and goals by club, season and competition
Club	Season	League			FA Cup		EFL Cup		Other		Total	
Club	Season	Division	Apps	Goals	Apps	Goals	Apps	Goals	Apps	Goals	Apps	Goals
Tottenham Hotspur U21	2022–23	—			—		—		2 (Note: Appearances in EFL Trophy)	0	2	0
Tottenham Hotspur U21	2023–24	—			—		—		3	2	3	2
Tottenham Hotspur U21	Total		—		—		—		5	2	5	2
Tottenham Hotspur	2023–24	Premier League	3	0	1	0	0	0	—		4	0
Tottenham Hotspur	2024–25	Premier League	0	0	0	0	0	0	0	0	0	0
Tottenham Hotspur	2025–26	Premier League	0	0	0	0	0	0	0	0	0	0
Tottenham Hotspur	2026–27	Premier League	0	0	0	0	0	0	—		0	0
Tottenham Hotspur	Total		3	0	1	0	0	0	0	0	4	0
Leyton Orient (loan)	2024–25	League One	39	8	4	0	2	0	7 (Note: Four appearances in EFL Trophy, three appearances in League One play-offs)	0	52	8
Stoke City (loan)	2025–26	Championship	4	0	—		2	0	—		6	0
Oxford United (loan)	2025–26	Championship	13	1	2	0	—		—		15	1
Luton Town (loan)	2026–27	League One	13	4	0	0	—		0	0	13	4
Career total			72	13	7	0	4	0	12	2	95	15

=== International ===
As of match played 14 November 2026

Appearances and goals by national team and year
National team	Year	Apps	Goals
Northern Ireland	2025	6	1
Northern Ireland	2026	9	1
Total		15	2

Scores and results list Northern Ireland's goal tally first.

List of international goals scored by Jamie Donley
No.	Date	Venue	Opponent	Score	Result	Competition
1.	17 November 2025	Windsor Park, Belfast, Northern Ireland	Luxembourg	1–0	1–0	2026 FIFA World Cup qualification
2.	31 March 2026	Cardiff City Stadium, Cardiff, Wales	Wales	1–0	1–1	Friendly

== Honours ==
Individual

- EFL Young Player of the Month: January 2025
- Leyton Orient Player of the Season: 2024–25
