= Azeem Abdulai =

Sierra Leonean footballer (born 2002)

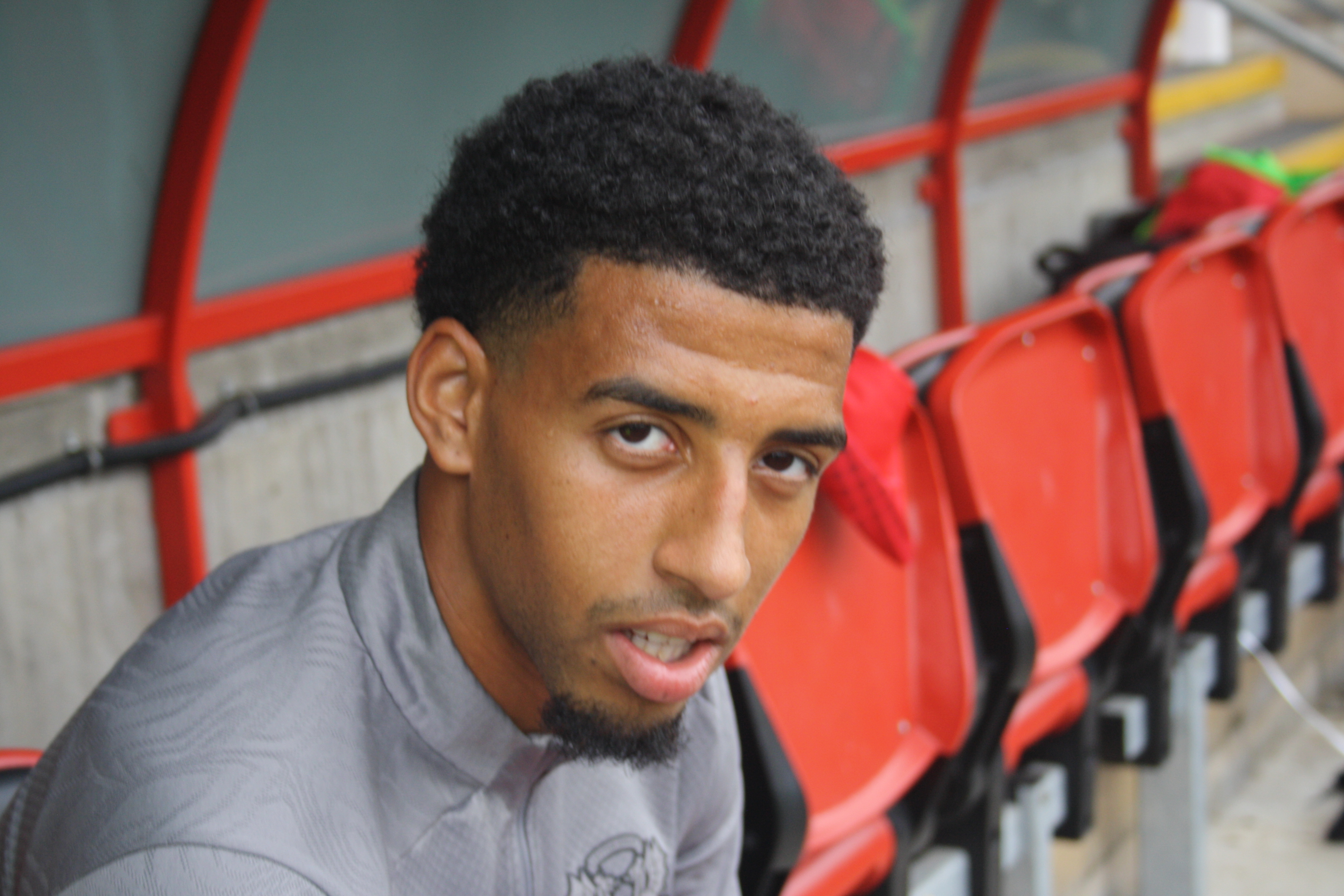
- Abdulai in 2025

Personal information
- Full name: Azeem Kerr Abdulai
- Date of birth: 9 December 2002 (age 23)
- Place of birth: Glasgow, Scotland
- Height: 1.83 m (6 ft 0 in)
- Position: Defensive midfielder

Team information
- Current team: Hibernian
- Number: 47

Youth career
- 2009–2012: Jimmy Johnstone Academy
- 2012–2019: Celtic
- 2020–2021: Leicester City

Senior career*
Years	Team	Apps	(Gls)
2021–2025	Swansea City	24	(1)
2025–2026	Leyton Orient	58	(5)
2026–	Hibernian	1	(0)

International career^{‡}
2023–2024	Scotland U21	6	(0)
2026–	Sierra Leone	1	(0)
- * Club domestic league appearances and goals as of 11:00, 4 July 2026 (UTC) ‡ National team caps and goals as of 00:54, 25 September 2026 (UTC)

Azeem Kerr Abdulai (born 9 December 2002) is a footballer who plays as a defensive midfielder for Scottish Premiership side Hibernian. Born in Scotland, he represents the Sierra Leone national team.

== Career ==
Abdulai was a youth at Celtic and Leicester before starting his senior career with Swansea. On 9 August 2022, Abdulai debuted for Swansea during an EFL Cup loss to Oxford United.

He scored his first goal for Swansea on 13 August 2024 in an EFL Cup tie against Gillingham.

=== Leyton Orient ===
On 22 January 2025, Abdulai signed for League One club Leyton Orient on a two-and-a-half year deal for an undisclosed fee. On 28 January, in his second appearance for the club, he scored a first career hat-trick in a 6–2 thrashing of Exeter City.

== International career ==
Abdulai was born in Scotland to a Sierra Leonean father and Scottish mother. He represented Scotland at under-21 international level, making his debut in March 2023. Abdulai switched his international status to Sierra Leone in 2026, and made his full international debut in a 3–2 defeat against Zimbabwe on 24 September.

== Career statistics ==
As of match played 5 April 2025

Appearances and goals by club, season and competition
Club	Season	League			FA Cup		League Cup		Other		Total	
Club	Season	Division	Apps	Goals	Apps	Goals	Apps	Goals	Apps	Goals	Apps	Goals
Swansea City	2022–23	Championship	0	0	0	0	1	0	—		1	0
Swansea City	2023–24	Championship	7	0	1	0	2	0	—		10	0
Swansea City	2024–25	Championship	17	1	1	0	2	1	—		20	2
Swansea City	Total		24	1	2	0	5	1	0	0	31	2
Leyton Orient	2024–25	League One	15	3	0	0	0	0	0	0	15	3
Career total			39	4	2	0	5	1	0	0	46	5
