= Ollie O'Neill =

Irish footballer

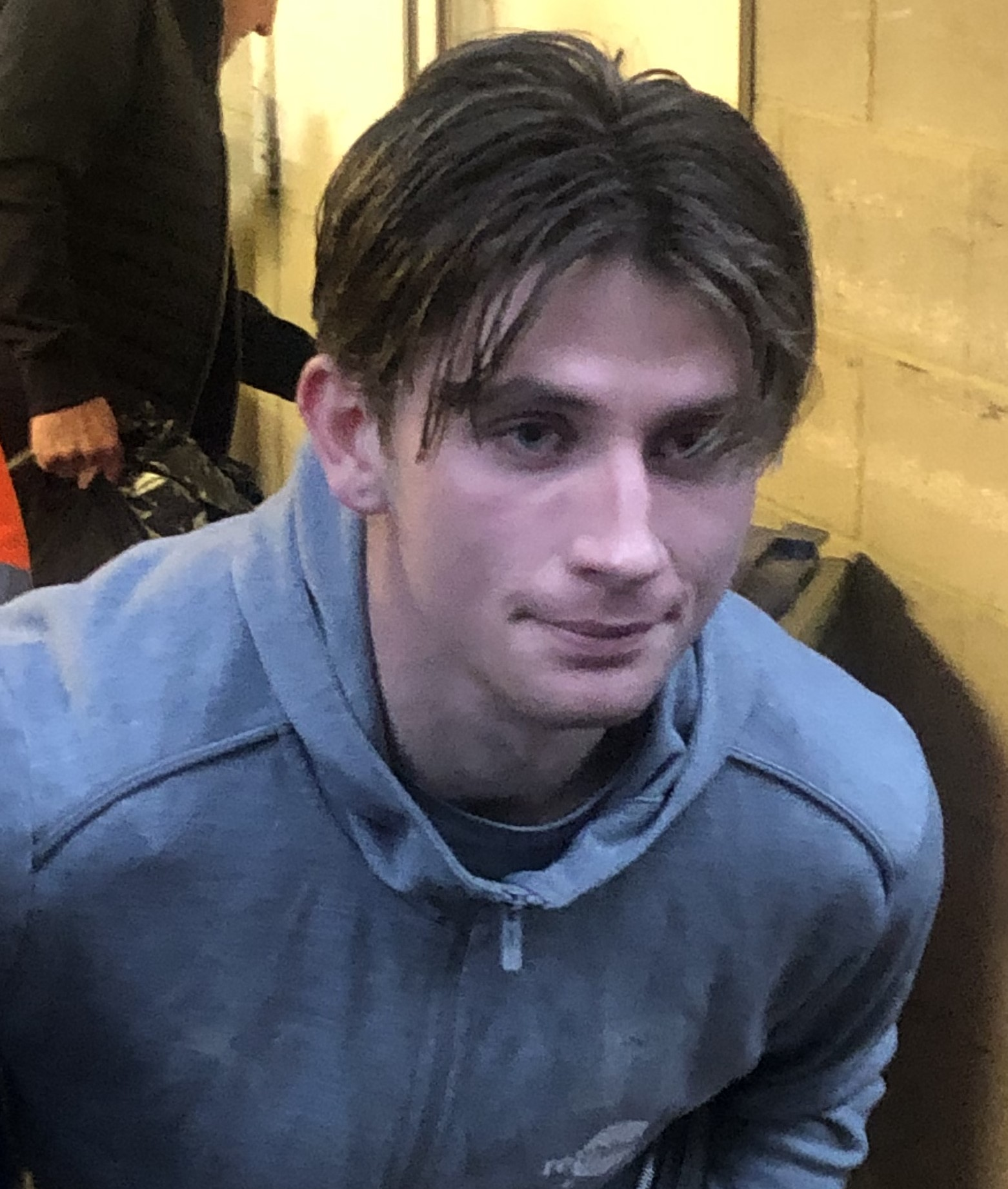
- O'Neill in 2024

Personal information
- Full name: Oliver John O'Neill
- Date of birth: 8 January 2003 (age 23)
- Place of birth: Hammersmith, England
- Position: Midfielder

Team information
- Current team: Leyton Orient
- Number: 7

Youth career
- 2010–2016: Brentford
- 2016–2022: Fulham

Senior career*
Years	Team	Apps	(Gls)
2022–2024	Fulham	0	(0)
2023	→ Derry City (loan)	19	(1)
2024–	Leyton Orient	77	(11)

International career^{‡}
- Republic of Ireland U16
2020	Republic of Ireland U17	3	(1)
2021	Republic of Ireland U19	1	(0)
2021–2024	Republic of Ireland U21	12	(2)
- * Club domestic league appearances and goals as of 17:10, 24 October 2026 (UTC) ‡ National team caps and goals as of 01:20, 16 October 2024 (UTC)

Oliver John O'Neill (born 8 January 2003) is an Irish professional footballer who plays as a midfielder for EFL League One club Leyton Orient and the Republic of Ireland U21 team.

== Early life ==
Brought up in West London, O'Neill was in the academy at Brentford from the age of seven until thirteen when they made the decision to disband their academy. O'Neill attended the City of London School where he received 11 A* GCSE grades and two A* A-Level grades.

== Club career ==
=== Fulham ===
O'Neill signed his first professional contract with Fulham in February 2020. He was named the scholar of the year in the Fulham academy in 2021. He called up to the first team squad at Fulham for the first time being an unused substitute against Leeds United in the EFL Cup in September 2021. He signed a new three-year contract with the club in July 2022. He had interest from other English clubs for a loan spell but was injured over the January 2023 transfer window and no moves materialised as a result.

==== Derry City (loan) ====
O'Neill joined Derry City on a six-month loan deal in February 2023. He said he was attracted by the style of play of Derry manager Ruaidhri Higgins. He made his League of Ireland debut for Derry City on 20 February 2023 in a 1–1 draw at St Patrick's Athletic. He scored his first league goal for Derry City on 6 March 2023 against UCD. He played nineteen games, starting twelve, before returning to Fulham.

=== Leyton Orient ===
On 23 January 2024, O'Neill signed for EFL League One side Leyton Orient for an undisclosed fee on a two-and-a-half-year contract.

== International career ==
O'Neill began representing Republic of Ireland at the under-16 Victory Shield. He scored a 92nd winner for the Republic of Ireland national under-21 football team against Sweden on 17 November 2021.

== Personal life ==
He was brought up in Ealing, London with his parents and brothers and sisters. They have Irish family in Waterford and Galway and Kerry. His father's family are from Waterford and his mother's family are living in Galway.

== Career statistics ==
As of match played 2 April 2026

Club	Season	League			National cup (Note: Includes FA Cup)		League cup (Note: Includes EFL Cup)		Other		Total	
Club	Season	Division	Apps	Goals	Apps	Goals	Apps	Goals	Apps	Goals	Apps	Goals
Fulham U21	2020–21	—			—		—		1 (Note: Appearance(s) in EFL Trophy)	0	1	0
Fulham U21	2023–24	—			—		—		3	2	3	2
Fulham U21	Total		—		—		—		4	2	4	2
Fulham	2021–22	Championship	0	0	0	0	0	0	—		0	0
Fulham	2022–23	Premier League	0	0	0	0	0	0	—		0	0
Fulham	Total		0	0	0	0	0	0	0	0	0	0
Derry City (loan)	2023	LOI Premier Division	19	1	—		—		—		19	1
Leyton Orient	2023–24	League One	17	5	—		—		—		17	5
Leyton Orient	2024–25	League One	26	2	2	0	2	0	6 (Note: Three appearances in EFL Trophy, three appearances and one goal in EFL League One play-offs)	1	36	3
Leyton Orient	2025–26	League One	33	4	1	0	1	0	1	0	36	4
Leyton Orient	Total		76	11	3	0	3	0	7	1	89	12
Career total			95	12	3	0	3	0	11	3	112	15
