= Tom James (Welsh footballer) =

Welsh footballer

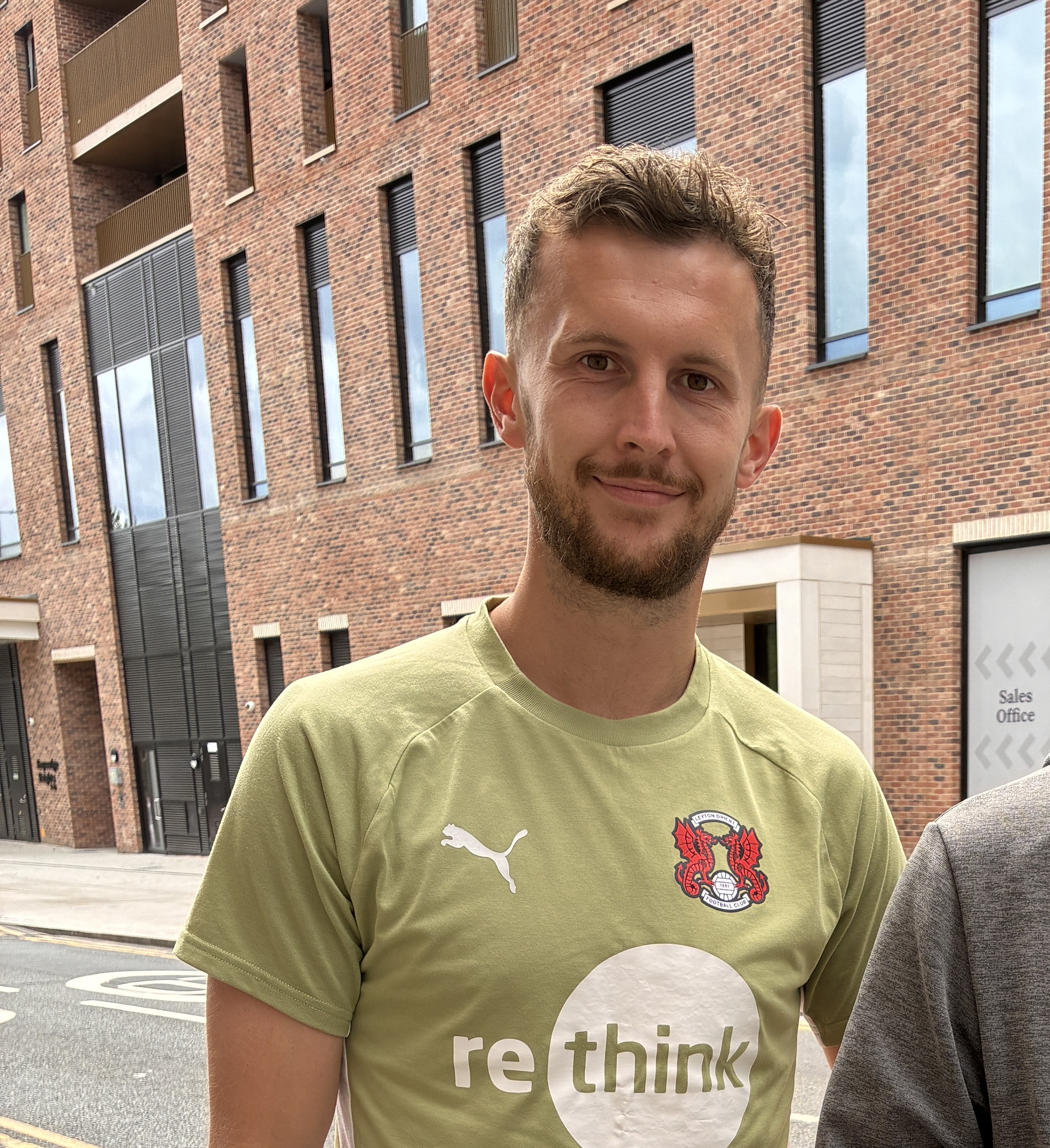
- James in 2025

Personal information
- Full name: Thomas Lynn James
- Date of birth: 15 April 1996 (age 30)
- Place of birth: Cardiff, Wales
- Height: 1.80 m (5 ft 11 in)
- Position: Defender

Team information
- Current team: Bristol Rovers
- Number: 2

Youth career
- 2004–2013: Cardiff City

Senior career*
Years	Team	Apps	(Gls)
2013–2017	Cardiff City	1	(0)
2017–2019	Yeovil Town	78	(6)
2019–2021	Hibernian	6	(0)
2020–2021	→ Wigan Athletic (loan)	20	(3)
2021	→ Salford City (loan)	4	(0)
2021–2026	Leyton Orient	162	(10)
2026–	Bristol Rovers	4	(2)

International career^{‡}
2014	Wales U19	2	(0)
- * Club domestic league appearances and goals as of 21:51, 10 September 2026 (UTC) ‡ National team caps and goals as of 13:01, 27 July 2019 (UTC)

Thomas Lynn James (born 15 April 1996) is a Welsh professional footballer who plays as a defender for EFL League Two club Bristol Rovers.

James has previously played for Cardiff City, Yeovil Town, Hibernian, Wigan Athletic, Salford City and Leyton Orient.

== Early life ==
James grew up in Taff's Well, attending Gwaelod-y-Garth Primary School and Ysgol Gyfun Garth Olwg, Pontypridd. He was playing for Pentyrch Rangers when talent-spotted by Cardiff City.

== Club career ==
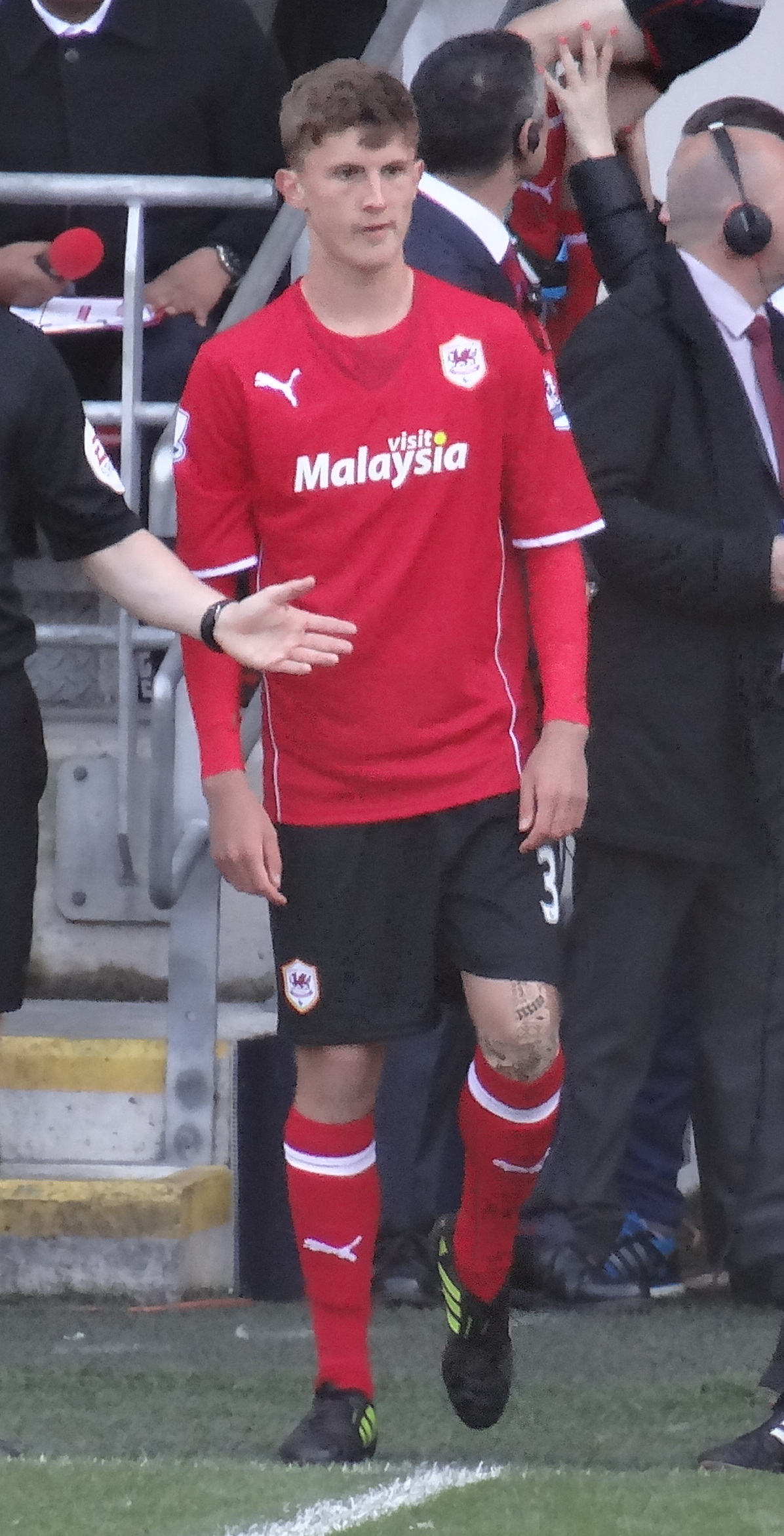
Tom James playing for Cardiff City in 2014.

James joined Cardiff City at under-9 level and signed his first professional contract with the club in April 2014. James made his professional debut for Cardiff against Chelsea on 11 May 2014, coming on as an 89th minute substitute for Fraizer Campbell in a 2–1 home loss.

On 13 January 2017, James signed for League Two side Yeovil Town on a contract until the end of the 2016–17 season, after his contract with Cardiff was cancelled by mutual consent. In January 2018 James signed a contract extension with Yeovil Town until the end of the 2018–19 season. On 1 August 2018, Yeovil accepted a bid of £400,000 from Championship side West Bromwich Albion for James. The move fell through the following day after James failed to agree personal terms with the Championship club.

James moved to Scottish Premiership club Hibernian in June 2019 for an undisclosed fee, signing a three-year contract. He scored his first goal for Hibernian in a 2–0 Scottish League Cup win over Alloa Athletic on 20 July 2019. On 17 September 2020, James moved on loan to Wigan Athletic until January 2021. He scored his first goal for Wigan in a 2–1 win away at Portsmouth on 26 September 2020. On 18 January 2021, James moved on loan to Salford City until the end of the 2020–21 season. He was cup-tied for Salford's victory in the 2020 EFL Trophy Final (played in March 2021).

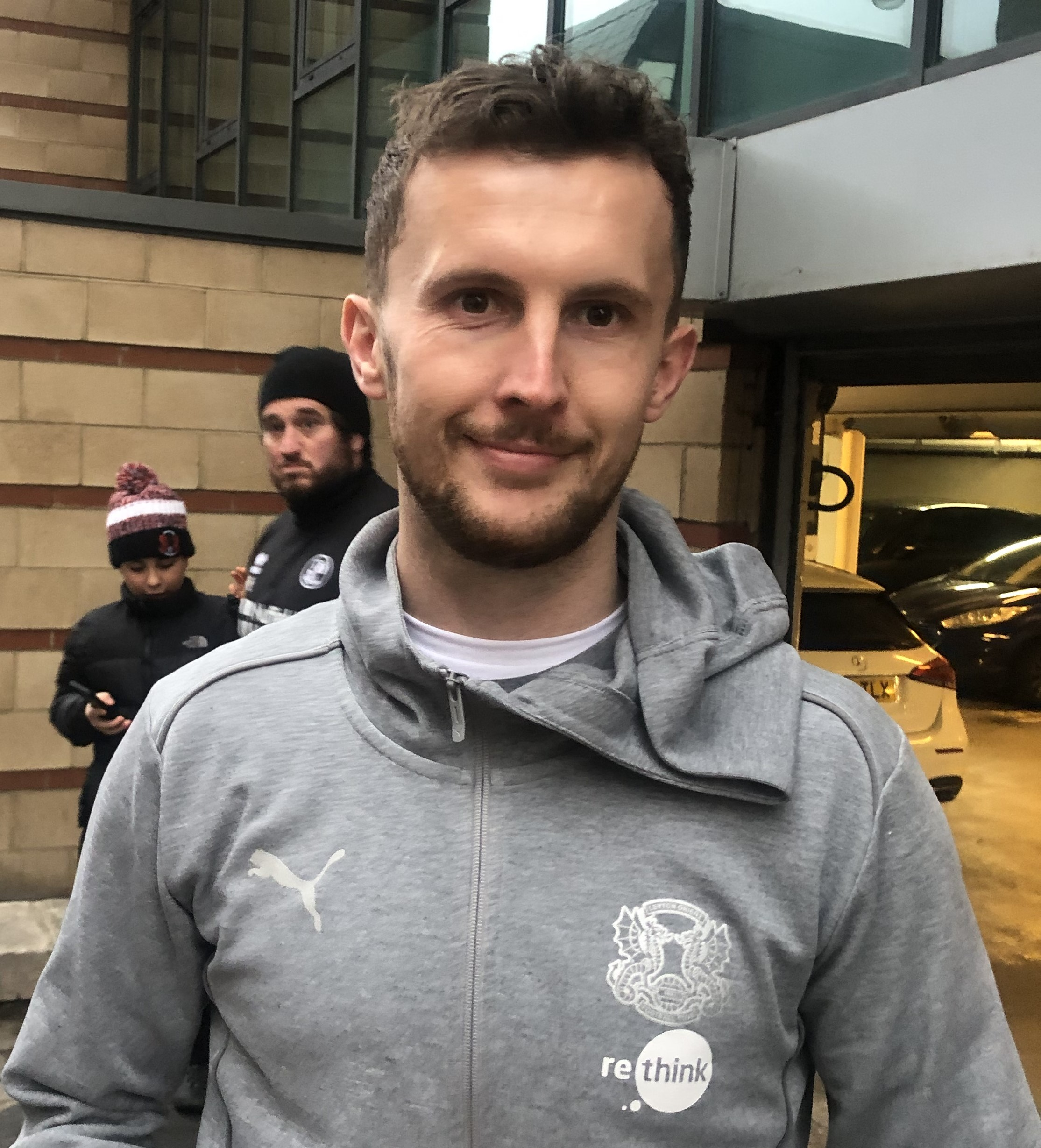
Tom James with Leyton Orient in 2024.

James left Hibernian permanently in July 2021 and signed a one-year contract with Leyton Orient. In May 2022 he signed for a further two years at Orient and in June 2024 signed another two-year deal,

On 7 May 2026, the club said it was releasing the player.

=== Bristol Rovers ===
On 19 June 2026, James agreed to join League Two club Bristol Rovers on a two-year deal.

== International career ==
At the end of May 2014, James was called up to the Wales under-19 team for their 2014 UEFA European Under-19 Championship elite round matches against Belgium, Portugal and Greece James made his under-19 debut in a 3–2 defeat to Portugal.

== Career statistics ==
As of match played 1 September 2026

Appearances and goals by club, season and competition
Club	Season	League			National cup (Note: Includes FA Cup, Scottish Cup)		League cup (Note: Includes EFL Cup, Scottish League Cup)		Other		Total	
Club	Season	Division	Apps	Goals	Apps	Goals	Apps	Goals	Apps	Goals	Apps	Goals
Cardiff City	2013–14	Premier League	1	0	0	0	0	0	—		1	0
Cardiff City	2014–15	Championship	0	0	0	0	0	0	—		0	0
Cardiff City	2015–16	Championship	0	0	0	0	0	0	—		0	0
Cardiff City	2016–17	Championship	0	0	0	0	0	0	—		0	0
Cardiff City	Total		1	0	0	0	0	0	—		1	0
Yeovil Town	2016–17	League Two	2	0	0	0	0	0	1 (Note: Appearance(s) in EFL Trophy)	0	3	0
Yeovil Town	2017–18	League Two	38	0	5	0	1	0	7	1	51	1
Yeovil Town	2018–19	League Two	38	6	1	0	1	0	2	1	42	7
Yeovil Town	Total		78	6	6	0	2	0	10	2	96	8
Hibernian	2019–20	Scottish Premiership	6	0	1	0	5	1	—		12	1
Hibernian	2020–21	Scottish Premiership	0	0	0	0	0	0	—		0	0
Hibernian	Total		6	0	1	0	5	1	—		12	1
Wigan Athletic (loan)	2020–21	League One	20	3	1	1	0	0	3	0	24	4
Salford City (loan)	2020–21	League Two	4	0	—		—		—		4	0
Leyton Orient	2021–22	League Two	21	4	2	0	1	0	2	0	26	4
Leyton Orient	2022–23	League Two	41	4	1	0	1	0	3	1	46	5
Leyton Orient	2023–24	League One	43	0	2	0	1	0	2	0	48	0
Leyton Orient	2024–25	League One	22	2	3	0	3	0	6 (Note: Three appearances in EFL Trophy, three appearances in League One play-offs)	0	34	2
Leyton Orient	2025–26	League One	35	0	0	0	1	0	1	0	37	0
Leyton Orient	Total		162	10	8	0	7	0	14	1	191	11
Bristol Rovers	2026–27	League Two	3	2	0	0	0	0	0	0	3	2
Career total			274	21	16	1	14	1	27	3	331	26

== Honours ==
Leyton Orient

- EFL League Two: 2022–23
