= Charlie Kelman =

American soccer player (born 2001)

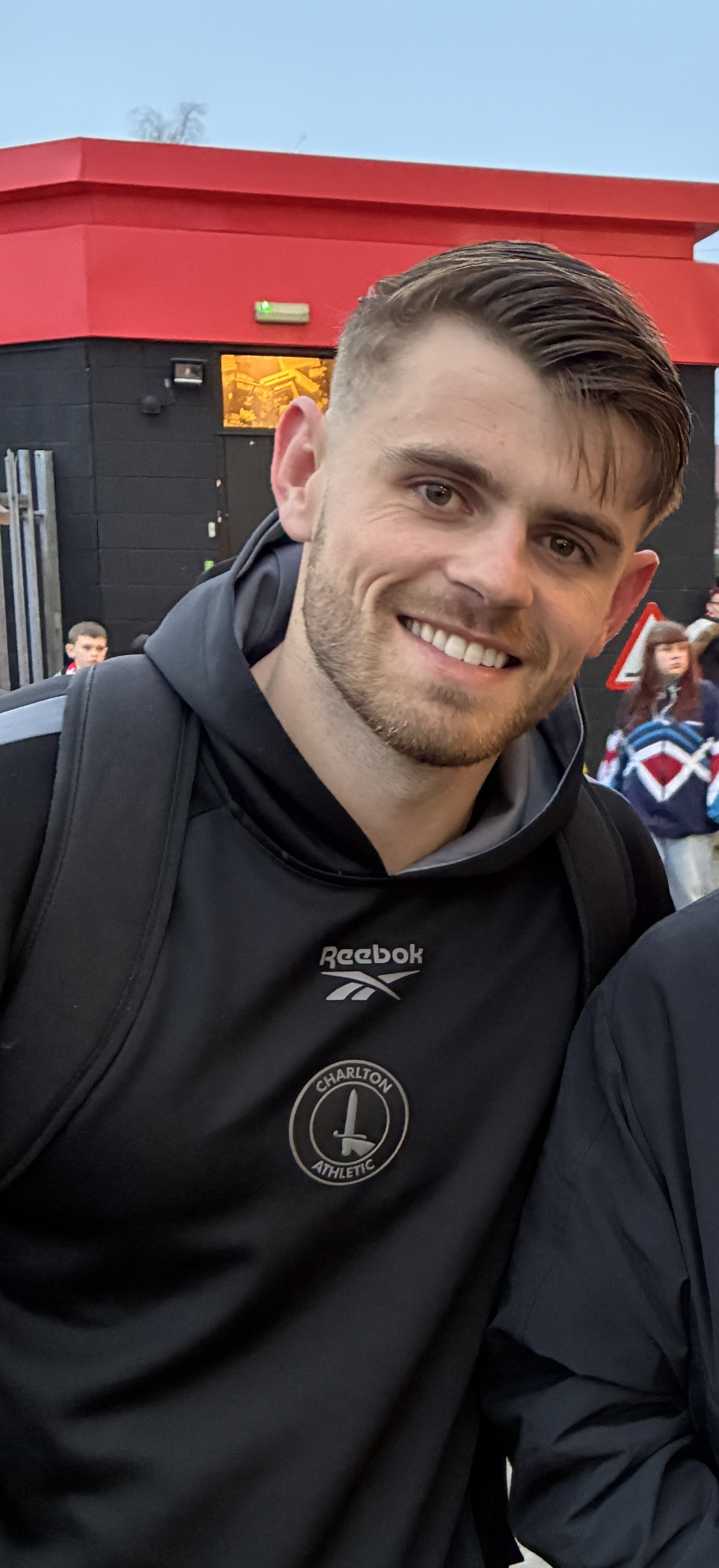
- Charlie Kelman in 2026

Personal information
- Full name: Charlie Robert Martin Lee-Kelman
- Date of birth: November 2, 2001 (age 25)
- Place of birth: Basildon, England
- Height: 1.75 m (5 ft 9 in)
- Position: Forward

Team information
- Current team: Charlton Athletic
- Number: 23

Youth career
- FC Dallas
- –2018: Southend United

Senior career*
Years	Team	Apps	(Gls)
2018–2020	Southend United	31	(6)
2020–2025	Queens Park Rangers	23	(0)
2021	→ Gillingham (loan)	5	(0)
2022	→ Gillingham (loan)	18	(2)
2022–2023	→ Leyton Orient (loan)	43	(7)
2024	→ Wigan Athletic (loan)	14	(3)
2024–2025	→ Leyton Orient (loan)	46	(21)
2025–	Charlton Athletic	43	(8)

International career^{‡}
2018	United States U18	1	(1)
2019	United States U20	19	(7)
- * Club domestic league appearances and goals as of 17:10, November 21, 2026 (UTC) ‡ National team caps and goals as of 22:10, December 29, 2025 (UTC)

Charlie Robert Martin Lee-Kelman (born November 2, 2001) is a professional soccer player who plays as a forward for EFL Championship club Charlton Athletic. Born in England, he represented the United States at youth level.

== Club career ==
=== Southend United ===
Kelman scored 61 goals at youth level for Southend United in the 2017–18 season. He made his professional debut for Southend in a League One match against Plymouth Argyle on January 12, 2019. He also scored his first professional goal in that match, finding the net from inside his own half in the second minute of stoppage time at the end despite Southend United losing 3–2. Kelman played in 10 games and scored one goal in his first full season as a professional with Southend. In his second season playing for Southend's first team, Kelman played in 18 games and was Southend's leading scorer in League One with five goals. In his last season with Southend, Kelman made two appearances in EFL League Two before transferring to Queens Park Rangers before the end of the summer transfer window.

=== Queens Park Rangers ===
On October 14, 2020, Kelman joined Queens Park Rangers on a three-year deal for an undisclosed fee.

Kelman appeared 26 times for QPR's first team, mainly coming on from the bench. He did however score a penalty in a 5–3 penalty shootout win over Leyton Orient in the first round of the EFL Cup. Upon returning from his highly successful second loan spell at Leyton Orient Kelman informed QPR CEO Christian Nourry he did not want to extend his contract at the club leading to the club deciding to listen to offers for him

==== Loans to Gillingham ====
On August 31, 2021, Kelman joined Gillingham on a season-long loan. He returned however to his parent club in November due to frustrations about a lack of playing time. On January 14, 2022, with previous manager Steve Evans having left the club, Kelman returned to Gillingham for the remainder of the season.

==== Leyton Orient (first loan) ====
On July 25, 2022, Kelman signed for League Two club Leyton Orient on a season-long loan deal.

==== Wigan Athletic (loan) ====
On January 31, 2024, Kelman signed a contract extension with Queens Park Rangers, subsequently joining League One club Wigan Athletic on loan for the remainder of the season.

==== Leyton Orient (second loan) ====
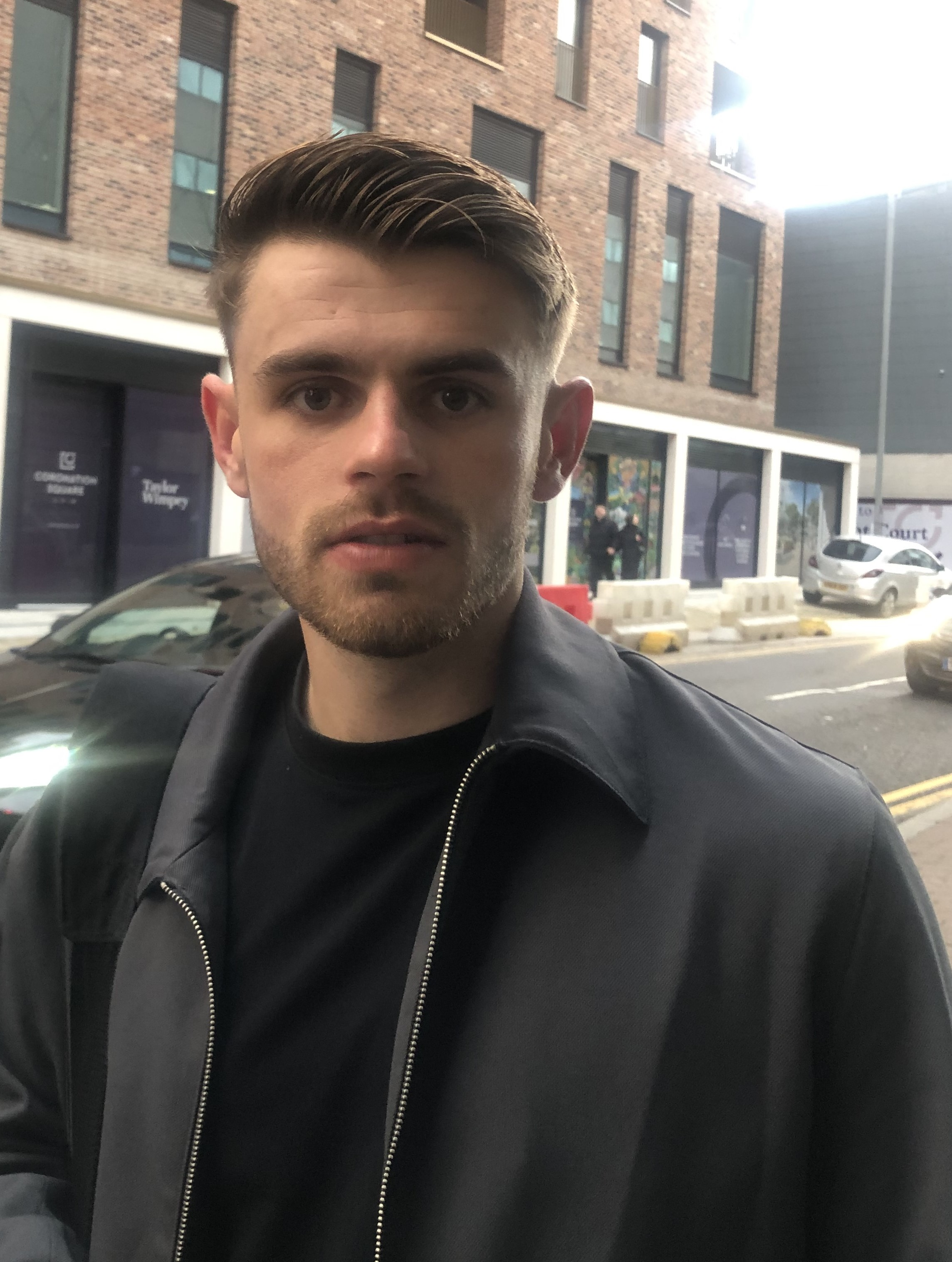
Charlie Kelman in 2024 during his time at Leyton Orient.

On June 29, 2024, Kelman signed for League One club Leyton Orient on a season-long loan deal.

Having helped the club reach the play-offs, winning the League One Golden Boot with twenty-one goals, Kelman was named EFL League One Player of the Month for April 2025.

=== Charlton Athletic ===
On July 27, 2025, Charlton Athletic made an offer which Queens Park Rangers accepted, leading to Kelman signing a four-year contract with the Addicks.

== International career ==
Kelman is eligible to represent England and the United States. He spent much of his youth in Dallas, Texas, including time in the setup of FC Dallas, before moving back to England. He has represented the United States at the under-18 and under-20 levels.

== Personal life ==
Kelman attended The Bromfords School in Wickford alongside former Southend teammate Matt Rush.

== Career statistics ==
As of match played November 21, 2026

Appearances and goals by club, season and competition
Club	Season	League			FA Cup		EFL Cup		Other		Total	
Club	Season	Division	Apps	Goals	Apps	Goals	Apps	Goals	Apps	Goals	Apps	Goals
Southend United	2018–19	League One	10	1	0	0	0	0	1 (Note: Appearance(s) in EFL Trophy)	0	11	1
Southend United	2019–20	League One	18	5	0	0	1	2	0	0	19	7
Southend United	2020–21	League Two	3	0	0	0	1	0	1	0	5	0
Southend United	Total		31	6	0	0	2	2	2	0	35	8
Queens Park Rangers	2020–21	Championship	11	0	1	0	0	0	–		12	0
Queens Park Rangers	2021–22	Championship	1	0	0	0	2	0	–		3	0
Queens Park Rangers	2022–23	Championship	0	0	0	0	0	0	–		0	0
Queens Park Rangers	2023–24	Championship	11	0	0	0	0	0	–		11	0
Queens Park Rangers	2024–25	Championship	0	0	0	0	0	0	–		0	0
Queens Park Rangers	Total		23	0	1	0	2	0	–		26	0
Gillingham (loan)	2021–22	League One	23	2	0	0	0	0	3	0	26	2
Leyton Orient (loan)	2022–23	League Two	43	7	1	0	1	0	2	0	47	7
Wigan Athletic (loan)	2023–24	League One	14	3	0	0	0	0	–		14	3
Leyton Orient (loan)	2024–25	League One	46	21	4	1	3	1	8 (Note: Five appearances and two goals in the EFL Trophy and three appearances and two goals in the EFL League One play-offs)	4	61	27
Charlton Athletic	2025–26	Championship	33	7	1	0	2	0	–		36	7
Charlton Athletic	2026–27	Championship	10	1	0	0	0	0	–		10	1
Charlton Athletic	Total		43	8	1	0	2	0	–		46	8
Career total			223	47	7	1	10	3	15	4	255	55

== Honors ==
Leyton Orient

- EFL League Two: 2022–23

Individual

- EFL League One Player of the Month: April 2025
- EFL League One Golden Boot: 2024–25
- PFA Team of the Year: 2024–25 League One
