= Dominic Ball =

English footballer (born 1995)

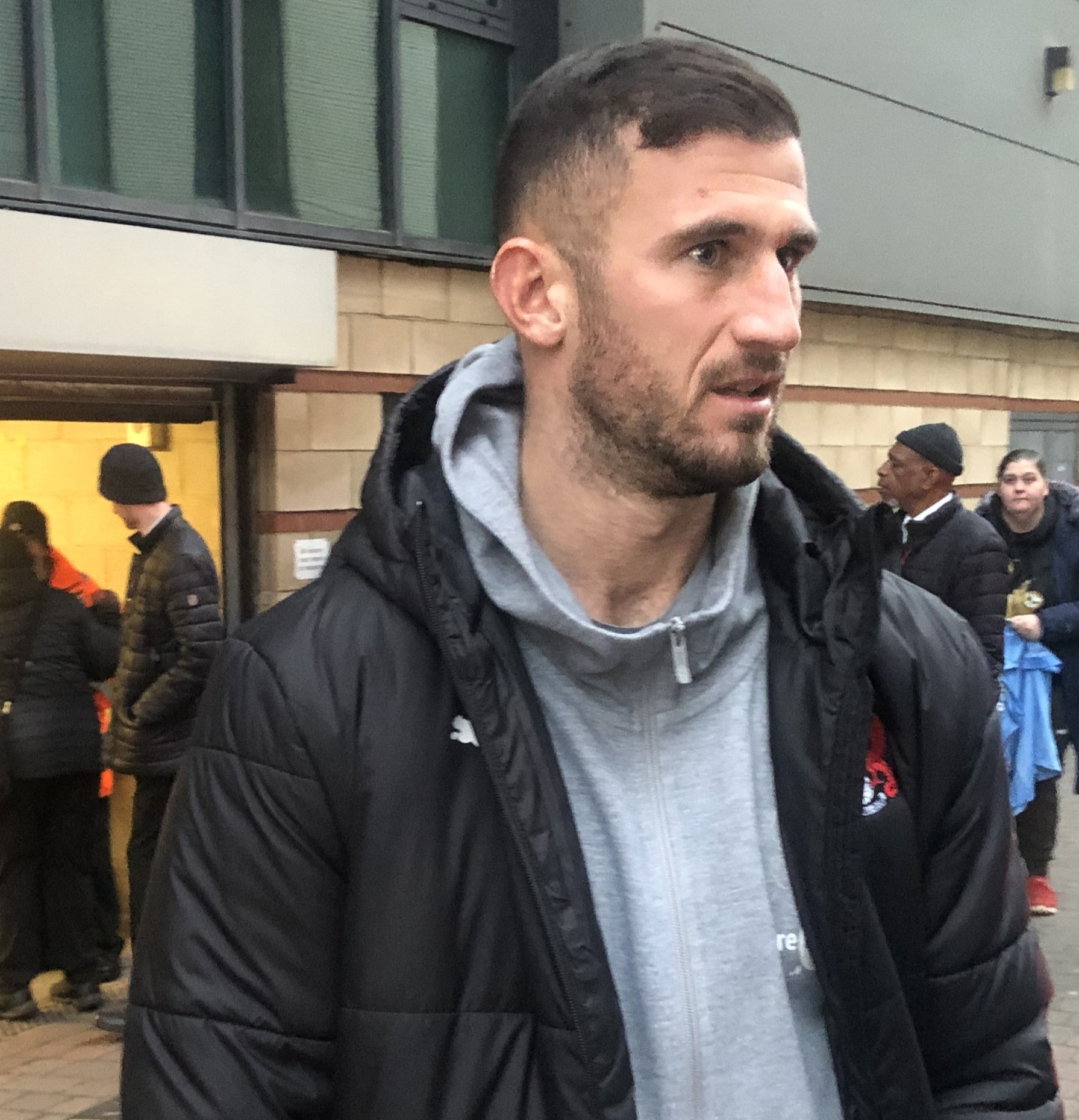

Personal information
- Full name: Dominic Martin Ball
- Date of birth: 2 August 1995 (age 31)
- Place of birth: Welwyn Garden City, England
- Height: 6 ft 0 in (1.84 m)
- Position: Defensive midfielder

Team information
- Current team: Cambridge United
- Number: 4

Youth career
- Watford
- 2011–2013: Tottenham Hotspur

Senior career*
Years	Team	Apps	(Gls)
2013–2016	Tottenham Hotspur	0	(0)
2015	→ Cambridge United (loan)	11	(0)
2015–2016	→ Rangers (loan)	21	(0)
2016–2019	Rotherham United	13	(0)
2017	→ Peterborough United (loan)	6	(1)
2017–2019	→ Aberdeen (loan)	47	(0)
2019–2022	Queens Park Rangers	90	(3)
2022–2024	Ipswich Town	26	(0)
2024–2025	Leyton Orient	31	(0)
2025–	Cambridge United	45	(2)

International career
2010	Northern Ireland U15	1	(0)
2010–2011	Northern Ireland U16	9	(1)
2011–2012	Northern Ireland U17	8	(2)
2012	Northern Ireland U19	4	(4)
2013	Northern Ireland U21	2	(0)
2014	England U19	1	(0)
2014–2015	England U20	7	(0)
- * Club domestic league appearances and goals as of 08:01, 18 October 2026 (UTC)

Dominic Martin Ball (born 2 August 1995) is an English professional footballer who plays for League Two club Cambridge United. He plays primarily as a defensive midfielder but can also play as a centre-back or at full-back.

== Club career ==
=== Tottenham and loan moves ===
A Tottenham Hotspur youth graduate, he joined the club's youth setup in 2011 from Watford and appeared in 17 matches during his first campaign, scoring one goal.

Ball appeared with the under-18s and with the under-21s in 2013–14, and was also named on the bench in a 2–2 UEFA Europa League away draw against Benfica on 20 March 2014. He was also an unused substitute in two further matches for Spurs in 2014–15, a 1–0 home win against Partizan and a 2–1 away win against Hull City.

On 22 January 2015, Ball was loaned to League Two side Cambridge United until the end of the season. He made his professional debut five days later, starting in a 1–1 home draw against Dagenham & Redbridge. He was used mainly as a right-back, making two assists in his time at the club.

On 14 August 2015, Ball signed a season-long loan deal with Scottish Championship club Rangers, reuniting with his Watford academy manager Mark Warburton. At Rangers, he helped them return to the Scottish Premiership as they won the Championship and also picked up honours when they won the Scottish Challenge Cup.

=== Rotherham United ===
On 12 August 2016, Ball signed for Championship side Rotherham United on a three-year deal. He was released from his contract at the end of the 2018–19 season, having spent all but five months of his three-year deal out on loan.

==== Peterborough United loan ====
On 3 January 2017, Ball joined Peterborough United on loan until the end of the season. He scored his first goal for Peterborough against Shrewsbury on 14 February. The loan ended early on 2 March 2017, after Ball had a disagreement with staff at Peterborough United.

==== Aberdeen loan ====
On 31 August 2017, Ball moved on loan to Aberdeen until the end of the season. He joined again for a second season-long loan spell on 18 July 2018.

=== Queens Park Rangers ===
Ball signed a two-year deal with Queens Park Rangers on 2 July 2019 upon expiry of his Rotherham United contract.

=== Ipswich Town ===
Ball joined Ipswich Town on 1 June 2022 on a two-year deal after the expiration of his contract with Queens Park Rangers. In November 2022, a ruptured meniscus ruled Ball out for a large part of the 2022–23 season. On 3 June 2024, Ipswich announced he would be leaving in the summer when his contract expired.

=== Leyton Orient ===
On 10 September 2024, Ball joined League One club Leyton Orient on a deal until the end of the season.

=== Cambridge United ===
On 23 June 2025, Ball returned to League Two side Cambridge United, ten years after his first spell at the club, to sign a two-year deal after rejecting a new contract with Leyton Orient.

== International career ==
After being capped by Northern Ireland in the under-15, under-16, under-17, under-19, and under-21 levels, Ball switched his allegiance to England in 2013. He has represented England up to U-20 level, making six appearances at that level.

== Personal life ==
Ball was born in Welwyn Garden City, Hertfordshire. Ball has an older brother, Matt, who is also a footballer, while his father Tim was academy business manager at Watford. Ball graduated from the Open University in 2021 with a degree in business studies, having studied part-time for six years.

In April 2022, Ball released a book called From Winning Teams to Broken Dreams about the football academy system in England. All proceeds from the book go the charity Sarcoma UK.

== Career statistics ==
As of match played 17 October 2026

Appearances and goals by club, season and competition
Club	Season	League			National Cup		League Cup		Other		Total	
Club	Season	Division	Apps	Goals	Apps	Goals	Apps	Goals	Apps	Goals	Apps	Goals
Tottenham Hotspur	2014–15	Premier League	0	0	0	0	0	0	0	0	0	0
Tottenham Hotspur	2015–16	Premier League	0	0	0	0	0	0	0	0	0	0
Tottenham Hotspur	Total		0	0	0	0	0	0	0	0	0	0
Cambridge United (loan)	2014–15	League Two	11	0	0	0	0	0	0	0	11	0
Rangers (loan)	2015–16	Scottish Championship	21	0	5	0	1	0	3 (Note: Appearances in Scottish Challenge Cup)	0	30	0
Rotherham United	2016–17	Championship	13	0	0	0	0	0	—		13	0
Rotherham United	2017–18	League One	0	0	0	0	1	0	1 (Note: Appearance(s) in EFL Trophy)	0	2	0
Rotherham United	2018–19	Championship	0	0	0	0	0	0	—		0	0
Rotherham United	Total		13	0	0	0	1	0	1	0	15	0
Peterborough United (loan)	2016–17	League One	6	1	0	0	0	0	0	0	6	1
Aberdeen (loan)	2017–18	Scottish Premiership	16	0	2	0	1	0	0	0	19	0
Aberdeen (loan)	2018–19	Scottish Premiership	31	0	3	0	4	0	2 (Note: Appearances in UEFA Europa League)	0	40	0
Queens Park Rangers	2019–20	Championship	31	1	2	0	2	0	—		35	1
Queens Park Rangers	2020–21	Championship	39	1	1	0	1	0	—		41	1
Queens Park Rangers	2021–22	Championship	20	1	1	0	2	0	—		23	1
Queens Park Rangers	Total		90	3	4	0	5	0	0	0	99	3
Ipswich Town	2022–23	League One	16	0	1	0	0	0	2	1	19	1
Ipswich Town	2023–24	Championship	10	0	2	0	4	0	—		16	0
Ipswich Town	Total		26	0	3	0	4	0	2	1	35	1
Leyton Orient	2024–25	League One	31	0	3	0	1	0	3 (Note: One appearance and in the EFL Trophy and two appearances in the EFL League One play-offs)	0	38	0
Cambridge United	2025–26	League Two	35	2	2	0	3	0	0	0	40	2
Cambridge United	2026–27	League One	10	0	0	0	2	0	2	0	14	0
Cambridge United	Total		45	2	2	0	5	0	2	0	54	2
Career total			281	6	21	0	21	0	13	1	347	7

== Honours ==
Rangers

- Scottish Championship: 2015–16
- Scottish Challenge Cup: 2015–16
- Scottish Cup runner-up: 2015–16

Aberdeen

- Scottish League Cup runner-up: 2018–19

Ipswich Town

- EFL League One runner-up: 2022–23
- EFL Championship runner-up: 2023–24
