= 2016–17 Leyton Orient F.C. season =

Leyton Orient F.C.
2016–17 season
- Chairman: Francesco Becchetti
- Manager: Andy Hessenthaler (until 26 September); Andy Edwards (caretaker) (from 26 September 2016 to 2 October 2016); Alberto Cavasin (from 2 October to 23 November); Andy Edwards (from 23 November to 29 January); Daniel Webb (from 29 January to 30 March); Omer Riza (from 30 March)
- Stadium: Brisbane Road
- League Two: 24th (relegated)
- FA Cup: First round (eliminated by Sheffield United)
- EFL Cup: First round (eliminated by Fulham)
- EFL Trophy: Group stage
- Top goalscorer: League: Gavin Massey, Paul McCallum, 8 goals All: Paul McCallum, 12 goals
Home colours	Away colours

The 2016–17 season was the 118th season in the history of Leyton Orient Football Club, their 101st in the Football League, and the second consecutive season in Football League Two.

== Transfers ==
=== In ===
Date from	Pos.	Nat.	Name	From	Fee	Ref.
1 July 2016	LB	(Northern Ireland)	Josh Doherty	(England) Watford	Free transfer	
1 July 2016	CB	(France)	Yvan Erichot	(Belgium) Sint-Truidense	Free transfer	
1 July 2016	LB	(England)	Callum Kennedy	(England) AFC Wimbledon	Free transfer	
1 July 2016	RW	(England)	Gavin Massey	(England) Colchester United	Undisclosed	
1 July 2016	CB	(England)	Tom Parkes	(England) Bristol Rovers	Free transfer	
1 July 2016	CM	(Northern Ireland)	Robbie Weir	(England) Burton Albion	Free transfer	
2 July 2016	CM	(Scotland)	Liam Kelly	(England) Oldham Athletic	Undisclosed	
5 July 2016	CF	(England)	Jordan Bowery	(England) Oxford United	Free transfer	
29 August 2016	CB	(France)	Teddy Mézague	(Belgium) Royal Excel Mouscron	Free transfer	
31 August 2016	RW	(France)	Ulrich N'Nomo	(France) Châteauroux	Undisclosed	
19 September 2016	CM	(Slovenia)	Žan Benedičič	(Italy) Ascoli	Free transfer	
20 September 2016	RB	(Netherlands)	Jens Janse	(Italy) Ternana	Free transfer	
28 October 2016	CM	(Republic of Ireland)	Michael Collins	(India) Bengaluru	Free transfer	

=== Out ===
Date from	Pos.	Nat.	Name	To	Fee	Ref.
1 July 2016	MF	(England)	Montel Agyemang	Free agent	Released	
1 July 2016	CB	(France)	Mathieu Baudry	(England) Doncaster Rovers (Note: Following Baudry's release, he signed for Doncaster Rovers.)	Released	
1 July 2016	CB	(England)	Connor Essam	(England) Eastleigh (Note: Following Essam's release, he signed for Eastleigh.)	Released	
1 July 2016	DM	(Wales)	Lloyd James	(England) Exeter City (Note: Following James' release, he signed for Exeter City.)	Released	
1 July 2016	CB	(England)	Sam Ling	Free agent	Released	
1 July 2016	LW	(Jamaica)	Jobi McAnuff	(England) Stevenage (Note: Following McAnuff's release, he signed for Stevenage.)	Released	
1 July 2016	CM	(Zimbabwe)	Bradley Pritchard	(England) Greenwich Borough (Note: Following Pritchard's release, he signed for Greenwich Borough.)	Released	
1 July 2016	LB	(England)	Frazer Shaw	(England) Accrington Stanley (Note: Following Shaw's release, he signed for Accrington Stanley.)	Released	
1 July 2016	RW	(England)	Blair Turgott	(England) Bromley (Note: Following Turgott's release, he signed for Bromley.)	Released	
1 July 2016	GK	(England)	Gary Woods	(Scotland) Hamilton Academical (Note: Following Wood's release, he signed for Hamilton Academical.)	Released	
2 July 2016	ST	(Republic of Ireland)	Michael Obafemi	(England) Southampton	Scholarship	
6 July 2016	CM	(England)	Kevin Nolan	Free agent	Released	
19 August 2016	CF	(Ivory Coast)	Armand Gnanduillet	(England) Blackpool	Undisclosed	
31 August 2016	SS	(England)	Scott Kashket	(England) Wycombe Wanderers	Free transfer	
31 August 2016	RB	(England)	Sean Clohessy	(England) Braintree Town (Note: Following Clohessy's decision to leave, he signed for Braintree Town.)	Mutual Consent	
1 September 2016	LW	(England)	Dean Cox	(England) Crawley Town (Note: Following Cox's decision to leave, he signed for Crawley Town.)	Mutual Consent	
3 January 2017	CM	(Slovenia)	Žan Benedičič	(Italy) Olbia Calcio (Note: Following Benedičič's departure, he signed for Olbia Calcio.)	Released	
3 January 2017	LB	(Northern Ireland)	Josh Doherty	(Northern Ireland) Ards (Note: Following Doherty's departure, he signed for Ards.)	Released	
10 January 2017	CF	(England)	Jay Simpson	(United States) Philadelphia Union	Undisclosed	
18 January 2017	RB	(Republic of Ireland)	Alan Dunne	(England) Bromley (Note: Following Dunne's departure, he signed for Bromley.)	Mutual Consent	

=== Loans in ===
Date from	Pos.	Nat.	Name	From	Date until	Ref.
26 July 2016	RW	(England)	Harry Cornick	(England) Bournemouth	14 January 2017	
31 January 2017	CF	(England)	Rowan Liburd	(England) Stevenage	End of Season	
31 January 2017	WG	(England)	Jordan Green	(England) Bournemouth	4 February 2017 (Note: Green's loan was planned to run until the End of the Season but was shortly cancelled due to registration issues.)	

=== Loans Out ===
Date from	Pos.	Nat.	Name	From	Date until	Ref.
17 August 2016	CM	(England)	Sammy Moore	(England) Dover Athletic	14 January 2017	
13 September 2016	CM	(England)	Freddy Moncur	(England) Wingate & Finchley	11 October 2016	
13 September 2016	LB	(Northern Ireland)	Josh Doherty	(England) Altrincham	13 October 2016	
25 November 2016	GK	(England)	Charlie Grainger	(England) Hampton & Richmond Borough	23 December 2016	
25 November 2016	FW	(Nigeria)	Victor Adeboyejo	(England) Margate	23 December 2016	
17 January 2017	CF	(England)	Jordan Bowery	(England) Crewe Alexandra	End of Season	
31 January 2017	CF	(England)	Ollie Palmer	(England) Luton Town	End of Season	

== Competitions ==
=== Pre-season friendlies ===
12 July 2016 Friendly	Wealdstone	1–2	Leyton Orient	Ruislip
19:45	Oshodi 5'	Report	Simpson 26'; Semedo 33'	Stadium: Grosvenor Vale

19 July 2016 Friendly	Woking	0–2	Leyton Orient	Woking
19:45		Report	Cox 65'; McCallum 73'	Stadium: Kingfield Stadium

30 July 2016 Friendly	Leyton Orient	2–0	Gillingham	Leyton
15:00	Massey 26'; Simpson 43' (pen.)	Report		Stadium: Brisbane Road

=== League Two ===
==== League table ====
Pos	Team	Pld	W	D	L	GF	GA	GD	Pts	Promotion, qualification or relegation
20	Yeovil Town	46	11	17	18	49	64	−15	50	
21	Cheltenham Town	46	12	14	20	49	69	−20	50	
22	Newport County	46	12	12	22	51	73	−22	48	
23	Hartlepool United (R)	46	11	13	22	54	75	−21	46	Relegation to the National League
24	Leyton Orient (R)	46	10	6	30	47	87	−40	36	Relegation to the National League

Updated to match(es) played on 6 May 2017. Source: BBC Sport
Rules for classification: 1) Points; 2) Goal difference; 3) Number of goals scored
(R) Relegated

==== Matches ====
6 August 2016 1	Cheltenham Town	1–1	Leyton Orient	Cheltenham
15:00	Waters 76'	Report	Massey 3'	Stadium: World of Smile Stadium; Attendance: 3,912; Referee: Lee Probert

13 August 2016 2	Leyton Orient	0–1	Newport County	Leyton
15:00 BST		Report	Turley 34'; Labadie (yellow card) 39'; Randall (yellow card) 68'	Stadium: Brisbane Road; Attendance: 4,184 (306); Referee: Michael Salisbury

16 August 2016 3	Leyton Orient	3–0	Stevenage	Leyton
19:45 BST	Massey 20', 75'; Cox 37'	Report	Franks (yellow card) 7'; Godden (yellow card) 13'; Wilkinson (yellow card) 82'	Stadium: Brisbane Road; Attendance: 3,779 (304 Stevenage fans); Referee: Brett Huxtable

20 August 2016 4	Grimsby Town	1–2	Leyton Orient	Cleethorpes
15:00 BST	Vose 90+2'; Chambers (yellow card) 90+4'; Andrew (yellow card) 90+4'	Report	Erichot (yellow card) 33'; Kelly 58'; Palmer 77'; Massey (yellow card) 86'	Stadium: Blundell Park; Attendance: 4,991 (347 Leyton Orient fans); Referee: Graham Salisbury

27 August 2016 5	Leyton Orient	1–2	Mansfield Town	Leyton
15:00 BST	Palmer (yellow card) 30'; Kelly (yellow card) 47' (goal) 73'	Report	Rose 68'; Green 89'	Stadium: Brisbane Road; Attendance: 3,996 (217 Mansfield Town fans); Referee: Kevin Johnson

3 September 2016 6	Morecambe	1–2	Leyton Orient	Morecambe
15:00 BST	Ellison 49' (yellow card) 90'; Rose (yellow card) 67'	Report	Kelly 27'; Bowery 55' (yellow card) 90'	Stadium: Globe Arena; Attendance: 1,665 (257 Leyton Orient fans); Referee: John Brooks

10 September 2016 7	Carlisle United	2–2	Leyton Orient	Carlisle
15:00 BST	Wyke 46'; Raynes (yellow card) 73'; Grainger 87' (pen.); Ibehre (yellow card) 87'	Report	McCallum 44'; Kelly (yellow card) 51'; Kennedy (yellow card) 56'; Cornick 64'; Palmer (yellow card) 90+6'	Stadium: Brunton Park; Attendance: 4,465 (236 Leyton Orient fans); Referee: Ben Toner

17 September 2016 8	Leyton Orient	0–1	Yeovil Town	Leyton
15:00 BST		Report	Eaves 76'	Stadium: Brisbane Road; Attendance: 4,557; Referee: Darren Deadman

24 September 2016 9	Notts County	3–1	Leyton Orient	Nottingham
15:00 BST	Duffy (yellow card) 45'; Forte 53'; Stead 55'; Laing (yellow card) 63' (yellow-red card) 69'; Milsom (yellow card) 72'; Collins 90+2'	Report	McCallum (yellow card) 78' (goal) 86'	Stadium: Meadow Lane Stadium; Attendance: 4,289 (476 Leyton Orient supporters); Referee: Brendan Malone

27 September 2016 10	Leyton Orient	0–2	Plymouth Argyle	Leyton, London
19:45 BST	Weir (red card) 1'; Janse (red card) 14'	Report	Spencer 11'; Donaldson 84'	Stadium: Matchroom Stadium; Attendance: 4,366; Referee: Charles Breakspear

1 October 2016 11	Barnet	0–0	Leyton Orient	Canons Park, London
15:00 BST	Dembélé (yellow card) 40'	Report	Kelly (yellow card) 51'; McCallum (yellow card) 81'; Massey (yellow card) 84'	Stadium: The Hive Stadium; Attendance: 2,682; Referee: Darren Handley

8 October 2016 12	Leyton Orient	0–1	Portsmouth	Leyton, London
15:00 BST		Report	Bennett (yellow card) 30'; Stevens (yellow card) 34'; Burgess 57'	Stadium: Matchroom Stadium; Attendance: 6,078; Referee: Chris Sarginson

15 October 2016 13	Leyton Orient	1–2	Luton Town	Leyton, London
15:00 BST	Palmer 79'; Sandro Semedo (yellow card) 81'	Report	McGeehan 30'; Hylton 74' (yellow card) 81'	Stadium: Matchroom Stadium; Attendance: 5,471; Referee: Ollie Yates

22 October 2016 14	Hartlepool United	1–3	Leyton Orient	Hartlepool
15:00 BST	Laurent 45+1'; Carroll (yellow card) 73'; Alessandra (yellow card) 77'; Carson (yellow card) 78'	Report	Sandro Semedo 55'; Palmer 62', 71'; Hunt (yellow card) 79'; Benedičič (yellow card) 83'	Stadium: The Northern Gas and Power Stadium; Attendance: 3,700; Referee: David Webb

29 October 2016 15	Leyton Orient	0–2	Crewe Alexandra	Leyton, London
15:00 BST		Report	Bakayogo (yellow card) 19'; Cooper 34'; Davis 42'; Turton (yellow card) 75'	Stadium: Matchroom Stadium; Attendance: 4,366; Referee: Andy Haines

12 November 2016 16	Colchester United	0–3	Leyton Orient	Colchester
15:00 GMT		Report	Simpson 11', 66'; Hunt 46'; Collins (yellow card) 65'; Parkes (yellow card) 82'	Stadium: Weston Homes Community Stadium; Attendance: 7,003; Referee: Dean Whitestone

19 November 2016 17	Leyton Orient	1–2	Blackpool	Leyton, London
15:00 GMT	Weir (yellow card) 64'; McCallum 89'	Report	Matt 30'; Aldred (yellow card) 51' (goal) 57'; Daniel (yellow card) 59'; Taylor (yellow card) 80'	Stadium: Matchroom Stadium; Attendance: 4,376; Referee: Brendan Malone

22 November 2016 18	Leyton Orient	0–1	Exeter City	Leyton, London
19:45 GMT	Massey (yellow card) 39'; Atangana (yellow card) 42'; McCallum (yellow card) 58'; Collins (yellow card) 65'; Hunt (yellow card) 71'	Report	Wheeler (yellow card) 13'; Watkins 26' (yellow card) 85'; Woodman (yellow card) 63'; Oakley (yellow card) 90+1'	Stadium: Matchroom Stadium; Attendance: 2,926; Referee: Tim Robinson

26 November 2016 19	Doncaster Rovers	3–1	Leyton Orient	Doncaster
15:00 GMT	Houghton 45+1'; Mandeville 59' (pen.), 66' (pen.)	Report	Kennedy 19'; Atangana (yellow card) 38'	Stadium: Keepmoat Stadium; Attendance: 5,135; Referee: Richard Jones

10 December 2016 20	Leyton Orient	1–0	Accrington Stanley	Leyton, London
15:00 GMT	Simpson 65'; McCallum (yellow card) 90+2'	Report	O'Sullivan (yellow card) 24'; McConville (red card) 24'	Stadium: Matchroom Stadium; Attendance: 3,964; Referee: Darren Drysdale

17 December 2016 21	Wycombe Wanderers	1–0	Leyton Orient	High Wycombe
15:00 GMT	Kashket 50'; Cowan-Hall (yellow card) 82'	Report	McCallum (yellow card) 76'; Hunt (yellow card) 76'	Stadium: Adams Park; Attendance: 4,517; Referee: Rob Lewis

26 December 2016 22	Leyton Orient	3–2	Crawley Town	Leyton, London
13:00 GMT	Dalby 4'; McCallum 11', 45+5' (pen.) (yellow card) 86'; Bowery (yellow card) 75'; Atangana (yellow card) 82'; Hunt (yellow card) 90'	Report	Roberts (yellow card) 45+4'; Mézague 54' (o.g.); Yorwerth (yellow card) 72'; Boldewijn 78'; Young (yellow card) 89'; Collins (yellow card) 90'; Payne (yellow card) 90+1'; Connolly (yellow card) 90+5'	Stadium: Matchroom Stadium; Attendance: 4,486; Referee: Trevor Kettle

31 December 2016 23	Leyton Orient	1–1	Cambridge United	Leyton, London
13:00 GMT	Judd (yellow card) 70'; McCallum (yellow card) 84'; Palmer 90+4'	Report	Dunk 21'; Mingoia (yellow card) 54'; Halliday (yellow card) 71'	Stadium: Matchroom Stadium; Attendance: 5,897; Referee: Lee Swabey

2 January 2017 24	Exeter City	4–0	Leyton Orient	Exeter
15:00 GMT	Wheeler 4'; Harley 50', 65' (pen.); McAlinden 82'	Report		Stadium: St. James' Park; Attendance: 4,537; Referee: Michael Salisbury

7 January 2017 25	Leyton Orient	1–3	Barnet	Leyton, London
15:00 GMT	Mézague (yellow card) 25'; McCallum 79'; Hunt (yellow card) 90+4'	Report	Santos 63', 66'; Weston 90+2'	Stadium: Matchroom Stadium; Attendance: 4,642; Referee: Andy Haines

14 January 2017 26	Portsmouth	2–1	Leyton Orient	Portsmouth
15:00 GMT	Chaplin (penalty missed) 21' 22', 47'; Doyle (yellow card) 72'	Report	Atangana (yellow card) 26'; Massey 37'	Stadium: Fratton Park; Attendance: 16,564; Referee: Brett Huxtable

28 January 2017 27	Mansfield Town	2–0	Leyton Orient	Mansfield
15:00 GMT	Whiteman 48' (yellow card) 82'; Rose 56'	Report	Massey (yellow card) 53'; McCallum (yellow card) 61'; Hunt (yellow card) 73'; Moore (yellow card) 80'	Stadium: Field Mill; Attendance: 3,925; Referee: Graham Salisbury

4 February 2017 28	Leyton Orient	1–2	Carlisle United	Leyton, London
15:00 GMT	Massey 25'; Hunt (yellow card) 45'	Report	Liddle 34'; Proctor 68' (yellow card) 74' (yellow-red card) 76'; Jones (yellow card) 76'	Stadium: Brisbane Road; Attendance: 4,306; Referee: Graham Horwood

7 February 2017 29	Leyton Orient	0–1	Morecambe	Leyton, London
19:45 GMT	Semedo (yellow card) 72'; Collins (yellow card) 82'	Report	Mullin 72' (yellow card) 73'; McGowan (yellow card) 83'	Stadium: Brisbane Road; Attendance: 2,660; Referee: John Brooks

11 February 2017 30	Yeovil Town	1–1	Leyton Orient	Yeovil
15:00 GMT	Zoko 45+1'; Lawless (yellow card) 55'; Dolan (yellow card) 78'	Report	Semedo (yellow card) 71'; Collins (yellow card) 73'; Kelly (yellow card) 75'; Massey 88' (yellow card) 89'	Stadium: Huish Park; Attendance: 3,120; Referee: Darren Deadman

14 February 2017 31	Plymouth Argyle	2–3	Leyton Orient	Plymouth
19:45 GMT	Sarcevic 10'; Kennedy 54'	Report	Kennedy (yellow card) 37'; Parkes (yellow card) 39'; Hunt (yellow card) 41'; Massey 43', 88'; Semedo (yellow card) 52' (goal) 90+4'; Kelly (yellow card) 70'	Stadium: Home Park; Attendance: 8,054; Referee: Chris Sarginson

18 February 2017 32	Leyton Orient	2–3	Notts County	Leyton, London
15:00 GMT	Semedo (yellow card) 31'; McCallum 49'; Koroma (yellow card) 63'; Mézague 81'	Report	Grant 35'; Duffy (yellow card) 38'; Stead 48', 84'; Milsom (yellow card) 62'; O'Connor (yellow card) 75'; Thompson (yellow card) 90+1'	Stadium: Matchroom Stadium; Attendance: 5,585; Referee: Brett Huxtable

25 February 2017 33	Leyton Orient	0–1	Cheltenham Town	Leyton, London
15:00 GMT	Massey (yellow card) 90'	Report	Winchester 21'; Rowe (yellow card) 40'	Stadium: Matchroom Stadium; Attendance: 4,747; Referee: Nigel Miller

28 February 2017 34	Stevenage	4–1	Leyton Orient	Stevenage
19:45 GMT	Kennedy 18'; Godden 22' (pen.); Wilkinson 48'; Pett 62'	Report	Hunt (yellow card) 22'; McCallum 24'; Massey (yellow card) 31'	Stadium: Broadhall Way; Attendance: 2,908; Referee: Charles Breakspear

4 March 2017 35	Newport County	0–4	Leyton Orient	Newport
15:00 GMT	O'Brien (yellow card) 30'; Labadie (yellow card) 60'	Report	Alzate 8'; Koroma 13', 45+2', 64' (pen.) (yellow card) 49'	Stadium: Rodney Parade; Attendance: 3,378; Referee: Gavin Ward

11 March 2017 36	Leyton Orient	0–3	Grimsby Town	Leyton, London
15:00 GMT	Collins (yellow card) 63'; Koroma (yellow card) 90+3'	Report	Jones 7'; Mills (yellow card) 56'; Osborne (yellow card) 58'; Kennedy 71' (o.g.); Vernon 87'	Stadium: Brisbane Road; Attendance: 5,288; Referee: Lee Swabey

14 March 2017 37	Accrington Stanley	5–0	Leyton Orient	Accrington
19:45 GMT	Kee 44'; Pearson 51', 90+1'; McConville 84', 85'	Report	Kennedy (yellow card) 11'; Collins (yellow card) 50'	Stadium: Wham Stadium; Attendance: 1,306; Referee: Graham Salisbury

18 March 2017 38	Leyton Orient	1–4	Doncaster Rovers	Leyton, London
15:00 GMT	Parkes 44'; Massey (yellow card) 68'	Report	Rowe 36'; Marquis 55', 82'; Mason (yellow card) 67'; Baudry 86'	Stadium: Brisbane Road; Attendance: 4,791; Referee: Chris Sarginson

25 March 2017 39	Crawley Town	3–0	Leyton Orient	Crawley
15:00 GMT	Collins 23'; McNerney 29'; Boldewijn 32'; Clifford (yellow card) 84'	Report	Kelly (yellow card) 28'	Stadium: Broadfield Stadium; Attendance: 2,918; Referee: Trevor Kettle

1 April 2017 40	Leyton Orient	0–2	Wycombe Wanderers	Leyton, London
15:00 GMT	Parkes (red card) 28'; Sandro Semedo (yellow card) 45+2'; Collins (yellow card) 75'	Report	Bloomfield 37'; Weston 38'	Stadium: Brisbane Road; Attendance: 4,526; Referee: Charles Breakspear

8 April 2017 41	Cambridge United	3–0	Leyton Orient	Cambridge
15:00 GMT	Berry 31'; O'Neil 41'; Maris 53'	Report		Stadium: Abbey Stadium; Attendance: 4,681; Referee: Nick Kinseley

14 April 2017 42	Luton Town	2–2	Leyton Orient	Luton
15:00 BST	Hylton 33'; Gambin (yellow card) 44'; Rea (yellow card) 54'; Vassell 73'; Cuthbert (yellow card) 81'	Report	Kelly 54' (pen.); Abrahams 61'; Ochieng (yellow card) 67'; Sargeant (yellow card) 73'	Stadium: Kenilworth Road; Attendance: 8,601; Referee: Brett Huxtable

17 April 2017 43	Leyton Orient	2–1	Hartlepool United	Leyton, London
15:00 BST	Adeboyejo 18'; Abrahams 34'; Semedo (yellow card) 59'; Koroma (yellow card) 84'	Report	Oates 8'; Walker (yellow card) 86'; Donnelly (yellow card) 90' (yellow-red card) 90+1'	Stadium: Brisbane Road; Attendance: 5,411; Referee: Dean Whitestone

22 April 2017 44	Crewe Alexandra	3–0	Leyton Orient	Crewe
15:00 BST	Ainley 26'; Wintle 30'; Cooper 45+1'; Bakayogo (yellow card) 72'	Report		Stadium: Gresty Road; Attendance: 3,745; Referee: Mark Brown

29 April 2017 45	Leyton Orient	1–3	Colchester United	Leyton, London
15:00 BST	Collins (yellow card) 36'; Semedo 52' (yellow card) 53'; Parkes (yellow card) 69'	Report	Fosu 26'; Loft (yellow card) 77'; Porter 78'; Bonne 80'	Stadium: Brisbane Road; Attendance: 6,854; Referee: Carl Boyeson

6 May 2017 46	Blackpool	3–1	Leyton Orient	Blackpool
17:30 BST	Danns 11'; Cullen 36'; Taylor 65'	Report	Janse 50'	Stadium: Bloomfield Road; Attendance: 3,602; Referee: David Webb

=== FA Cup ===
6 November 2016 First round	Sheffield United	6–0	Leyton Orient	Sheffield
14:00 GMT	Basham 22'; Scougall 39'; Freeman 45'; Chapman 54', 69', 90+2'	Report	Massey (yellow card) 74'	Stadium: Bramall Lane; Attendance: 6,099; Referee: Nigel Miller

=== EFL Cup ===
9 August 2016 First round	Leyton Orient	2–3	Fulham	Leyton
19:45 BST	Pollock (yellow card) 28'; McCallum 73', 81'	Report	Adeniran 29' (yellow card) 30'; Woodrow 51', 54'	Stadium: Brisbane Road; Attendance: 3,855; Referee: Andy Davies

=== EFL Trophy ===
Pos	Div	Team	Pld	W	PW	PL	L	GF	GA	GD	Pts	Qualification
1	L1	Southend United	3	2	0	0	1	3	4	−1	6	Advance to Round 2
2	ACA	Brighton & Hove Albion U21	3	1	1	0	1	3	4	−1	5	Advance to Round 2
3	L2	Stevenage	3	1	0	1	1	7	5	+2	4	
4	L2	Leyton Orient	3	1	0	0	2	3	3	0	3	

Source: Sky Sports

30 August 2016 Group stage 1	Leyton Orient	3–1	Stevenage	Leyton
19:45 BST	McCallum 33', 70'; Kelly (yellow card) 46'; Semedo 54'	Report	Wells (red card) 13'; Franks 58' (yellow card) 90'	Stadium: Brisbane Road; Attendance: 876; Referee: Gavin Ward

4 October 2016 Group stage 2	Southend United	1–0	Leyton Orient	Southend-on-Sea
19:45 BST	Fortuné (yellow card) 41' (goal) 82'	Report	Kennedy (yellow card) 54'	Stadium: Roots Hall Stadium; Attendance: 2,383; Referee: Andy Woolmer

8 November 2016 Group stage 3	Brighton & Hove Albion U21	1–0	Leyton Orient	Falmer
19:45 GMT	Towell 16'	Report		Stadium: Falmer Stadium; Attendance: 549; Referee: Lee Probert

== Player statistics ==
As of May 6, 2017

No.	Pos	Nat	Player	Total		League Two		FA Cup		EFL Cup		EFL Trophy	
No.	Pos	Nat	Player	Apps	Goals	Apps	Goals	Apps	Goals	Apps	Goals	Apps	Goals
Goalkeepers
1	GK	(Australia) AUS	Alex Cisak	30	0	28	0	1	0	0	0	1	0
12	GK	(England) ENG	Charlie Grainger	3	0	3	0	0	0	0	0	0	0
24	GK	(England) ENG	Sam Sargeant	18	0	15	0	0	0	1	0	2	0
Defenders
3	DF	(England) ENG	Callum Kennedy	37	1	31+1	1	1	0	1	0	3	0
6	DF	(England) ENG	Tom Parkes	44	1	41	1	1	0	0	0	2	0
16	DF	(England) ENG	Nicky Hunt	38	1	34	1	1	0	1	0	2	0
19	DF	(France) FRA	Teddy Mézague	17	1	11+6	1	0	0	0	0	0	0
25	DF	(England) ENG	Aron Pollock	13	0	8+1	0	0	0	1	0	3	0
34	DF	(England) ENG	Michael Clark	9	0	8+1	0	0	0	0	0	0	0
37	DF	(France) FRA	Yvan Erichot	20	0	18+1	0	0	0	1	0	0	0
38	DF	(England) ENG	Dan Happe	2	0	1+1	0	0	0	0	0	0	0
46	DF	(Netherlands) NED	Jens Janse	11	1	8	1	0+1	0	0	0	1+1	0
Midfielders
4	MF	(Scotland) SCO	Liam Kelly	24	4	19+2	4	0	0	1	0	1+1	0
7	MF	(Republic of Ireland) IRL	Michael Collins	31	0	28+2	0	0	0	0	0	1	0
8	MF	(Northern Ireland) NIR	Robbie Weir	21	0	15+2	0	1	0	1	0	2	0
15	MF	(France) FRA	Nigel Atangana	31	0	24+4	0	1	0	0+1	0	1	0
17	MF	(England) ENG	Sammy Moore	4	0	3+1	0	0	0	0	0	0	0
22	MF	(Portugal) POR	Sandro Semedo	46	4	35+7	3	1	0	1	0	2	1
23	MF	(England) ENG	Freddy Moncur	9	0	5+4	0	0	0	0	0	0	0
29	MF	(England) ENG	Myles Judd	21	0	20	0	0	0	0	0	0+1	0
31	MF	(Colombia) COL	Steven Alzate	12	1	9+3	1	0	0	0	0	0	0
32	MF	(Kenya) KEN	Henry Ochieng	7	0	4+2	0	0	0	0	0	0+1	0
Forwards
10	FW	(England) ENG	Paul McCallum	33	12	20+9	8	0+1	0	0+1	2	2	2
11	FW	(England) ENG	Gavin Massey	39	8	36	8	1	0	1	0	1	0
18	FW	(France) FRA	Ulrich N'Nomo	7	0	1+5	0	0	0	0	0	1	0
20	FW	(England) ENG	Rowan Liburd (on loan from Stevenage)	8	0	4+4	0	0	0	0	0	0	0
26	FW	(Nigeria) NGR	Victor Adeboyejo	14	1	4+9	1	0	0	0	0	0+1	0
28	FW	(England) ENG	Josh Koroma	24	3	12+10	3	0	0	0	0	1+1	0
30	FW	(England) ENG	Sam Dalby	17	1	10+6	1	0	0	0	0	0+1	0
35	FW	(England) ENG	Tristan Abrahams	9	2	4+5	2	0	0	0	0	0	0
Out on Loan
9	FW	(England) ENG	Ollie Palmer	23	5	10+10	5	1	0	1	0	1	0
21	FW	(England) ENG	Jordan Bowery	20	1	9+8	1	0+1	0	0	0	2	0
Left During Season
2	DF	(England) ENG	Sean Clohessy	2	0	2	0	0	0	0	0	0	0
5	DF	(Republic of Ireland) IRL	Alan Dunne	8	0	0+5	0	1	0	0	0	1+1	0
7	MF	(England) ENG	Dean Cox	5	1	4	1	0	0	0+1	0	0	0
17	DF	(Northern Ireland) NIR	Josh Doherty	0	0	0	0	0	0	0	0	0	0
20	FW	(England) ENG	Harry Cornick (on loan from Bournemouth)	13	1	9+2	1	0	0	1	0	1	0
27	FW	(England) ENG	Jay Simpson	17	3	12+2	3	1	0	0	0	1+1	0
33	MF	(Slovenia) SLO	Žan Benedičič	2	0	0+1	0	0	0	0	0	1	0
45	FW	(Ivory Coast) CIV	Armand Gnanduillet	1	0	0+1	0	0	0	0	0	0	0

=== Top scorers ===
Includes all competitive matches. The list is sorted by squad number when total goals are equal.

Last updated 6 May 2016.

Rank	No.	Nationality	Player	League Two	FA Cup	EFL Cup	EFL Trophy	Total
1
1	10	(England)	Paul McCallum	8	0	2	2	12
2
2	11	(England)	Gavin Massey	8	0	0	0	8
3
3	9	(England)	Ollie Palmer	5	0	0	0	5
4
4	4	(Scotland)	Liam Kelly	4	0	0	0	4
4	22	(Portugal)	Sandro Semedo	3	0	0	1	4
6
6	27	(England)	Jay Simpson	3	0	0	0	3
6	28	(England)	Josh Koroma	3	0	0	0	3
10
10	35	(England)	Tristan Abrahams	2	0	0	0	2
11
11	3	(England)	Callum Kennedy	1	0	0	0	1
11	6	(England)	Tom Parkes	1	0	0	0	1
11	7	(England)	Dean Cox	1	0	0	0	1
11	16	(England)	Nicky Hunt	1	0	0	0	1
11	19	(France)	Teddy Mézague	1	0	0	0	1
11	20	(England)	Harry Cornick	1	0	0	0	1
11	21	(England)	Jordan Bowery	1	0	0	0	1
11	26	(Nigeria)	Victor Adeboyejo	1	0	0	0	1
11	30	(England)	Sam Dalby	1	0	0	0	1
11	31	(England)	Steven Alzate	1	0	0	0	1
11	46	(Netherlands)	Jens Janse	1	0	0	0	1
TOTALS				47	0	2	3	52

=== Disciplinary record ===
Includes all competitive matches. The list is sorted by position, and then shirt number.

N	P	Nat.	Name	League Two			FA Cup			EFL Cup			EFL Trophy			Total			Notes
N	P	Nat.	Name	Yellow card	Second yellow card	Red card	Yellow card	Second yellow card	Red card	Yellow card	Second yellow card	Red card	Yellow card	Second yellow card	Red card	Yellow card	Second yellow card	Red card	Notes
24	GK	(England)	Sam Sargeant	1												1			
3	DF	(England)	Callum Kennedy	3									1			4			
6	DF	(England)	Tom Parkes	3		1										3		1	
16	DF	(England)	Nicky Hunt	11												11			
19	DF	(France)	Teddy Mézague	1												1			
25	DF	(England)	Aron Pollock							1						1			
37	DF	(France)	Yvan Erichot	2												2			
46	DF	(Netherlands)	Jens Janse			1												1	
4	MF	(Scotland)	Liam Kelly	7									1			8			
7	MF	(Republic of Ireland)	Michael Collins	9												9			
8	MF	(Northern Ireland)	Robbie Weir	1		1										1		1	
15	MF	(France)	Nigel Atangana	6												6			
17	MF	(England)	Sammy Moore	1			1									2			
22	MF	(Portugal)	Sandro Semedo	8												8			
28	MF	(England)	Josh Koroma	4												4			
29	MF	(England)	Myles Judd	1												1			
32	MF	(England)	Henry Ochieng	1												1			
33	MF	(Slovenia)	Žan Benedičič	1												1			
9	FW	(England)	Ollie Palmer	1												1			
10	FW	(England)	Paul McCallum	8												8			
11	FW	(England)	Gavin Massey	9			1									10			
20	FW	(England)	Harry Cornick	1												1			
21	FW	(England)	Jordan Bowery	2												2			
TOTALS				72	0	3	2	0	0	1	0	0	2	0	0	77	0	3	

Last updated: 29 April 2017
Ordered by (red card) , (second yellow card) and (yellow card)
(yellow card) = Number of bookings; (second yellow card) = Number of sending offs after a second yellow card; (red card) = Number of sending offs by a direct red card. |}
