= Michael Clark =

Michael (or Mike) Clark may refer to:

== Music ==
- Mike Clark (drummer) (born 1946), American jazz drummer
- Mike Clark (guitarist), Suicidal Tendencies guitarist
- Mike Clark (indie rock musician), guitarist and keyboardist for Stephen Malkmus and the Jicks
- Mike E. Clark, rap music producer

== Politics ==
- Michael Clark (British politician) (born 1935), British politician
- Michael Clark (Canadian politician) (1861–1926), Member of Parliament, 1908–1921

== Sports ==
- Michael Clark (English footballer), English football player
- Michael Clark (Australian footballer) (born 1981), Australian rules footballer
- Michael Clark (New Zealand cricketer) (born 1966), New Zealand cricketer
- Michael Clark (sportsman) (born 1978), Western Warriors cricketer and Australian Football League player
- Mick Clark, rugby league footballer of the 1960s for Great Britain, and Leeds
- Mike Clark (American football, born 1954), American football strength and conditioning coach
- Mike Clark (athletic director), American football coach and athletic director at Lycoming College
- Mike Clark (American football coach, Bridgewater), American football coach at Bridgewater College
- Mike Clark (placekicker) (1940–2002), Dallas Cowboys kicker
- Mike Clark (defensive end) (born 1959), former American football player
- Mike Clark (baseball) (1922–1996), Major League Baseball player
- Mike Clark (racing driver), racing driver in NASCAR
- Michael Clark (boxer) (born 1973), American boxer
- Mike Clark (soccer) (born 1972), American soccer player
- Michael Clark II (born 1969), American golfer
- Michael Clark (wide receiver) (born 1995), American football player
- Michael Clark (runner), (born 2008), British long-distance runner

== Other ==
- Michael Clark (dancer) (born 1962), British post-punk ballet dancer
- Michael Clark (artist) (born 1954), British contemporary artist
- Michael Clark, philosophy professor; editor of philosophy journal Analysis (2000–2016)
- Michael Stephen Clark, American newspaper columnist
- Michael William Clark, British industrialist and High Sheriff of Essex
- Mickey Clark, stock market analyst
- Mike Clark (critic) (1947–2020), American film critic
- Mike Clark (conservationist) (born 1945), social and environmental activist
- Mike Clark, Detroit-based radio host and member of Drew and Mike Podcast

== See also ==
- Michael Clarke (disambiguation)
- Micheal Clark, president and CEO of the National Academy of Sports Medicine
