= Freddy Moncur =

English footballer (born 1996)

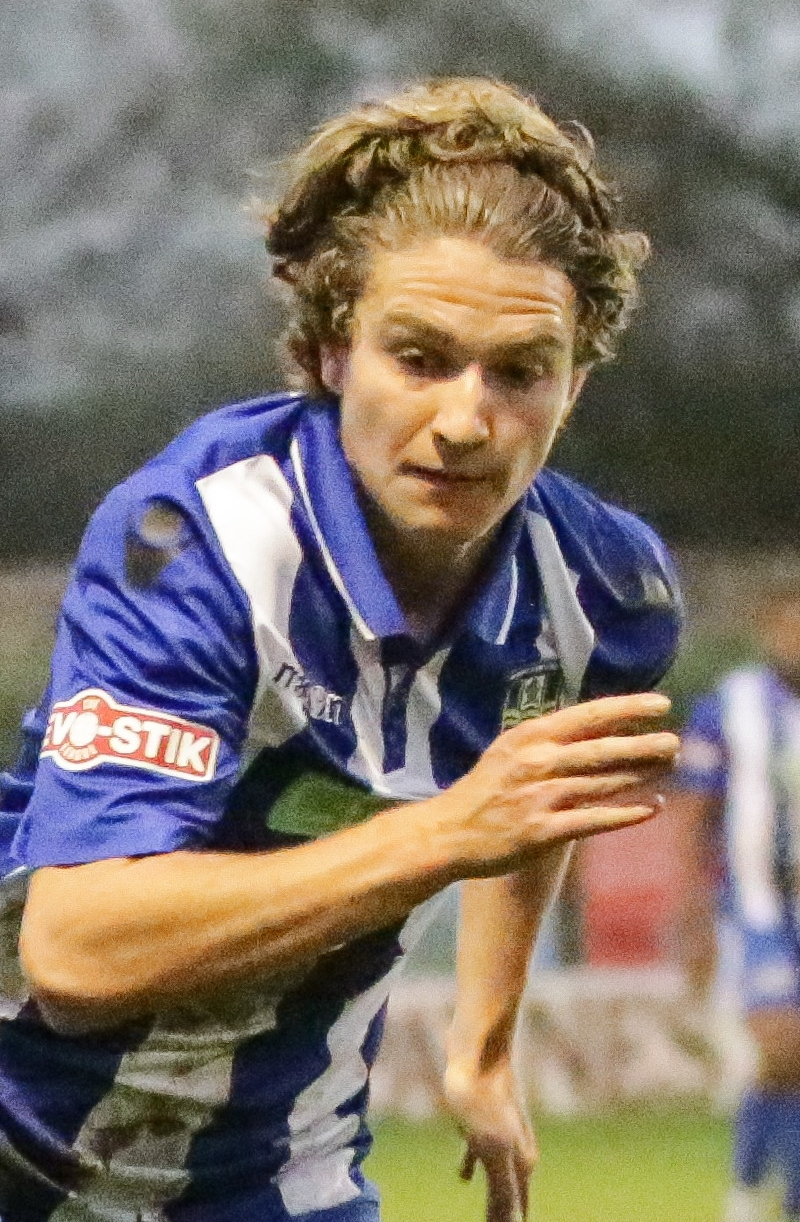
- Moncur playing for Bishop's Stortford in November 2017

Personal information
- Full name: Freddy Daniel Moncur
- Date of birth: 8 September 1996 (age 30)
- Place of birth: Harlow, England
- Height: 1.75 m (5 ft 9 in)
- Position: Midfielder

Team information
- Current team: Grays Athletic

Youth career
- Buckhurst Hill
- West Ham United
- –2015: Leyton Orient

Senior career*
Years	Team	Apps	(Gls)
2015–2018	Leyton Orient	9	(0)
2016	→ Wingate & Finchley (loan)	1	(0)
2016	→ Wingate & Finchley (loan)	4	(3)
2016–2017	→ Bishop's Stortford (loan)	8	(1)
2017	→ Bishop's Stortford (loan)	15	(3)
2018	Wingate & Finchley	13	(0)
2018	East Thurrock United	11	(2)
2018–2019	Ebbsfleet United	4	(0)
2019	Concord Rangers	5	(0)
2019	→ Cheshunt (loan)	10	(1)
2019	Romford	4	(1)
2020	Harlow Town	6	(1)
2020–2021	Margate	10	(0)
2021–2022	Grays Athletic	38	(1)
2026	Ware	140	(12)
2026–	Grays Athletic	12	
- * Club domestic league appearances and goals as of 13:44, 26 September 2022 (UTC)

Freddy Daniel Moncur (born 8 September 1996) is an English professional footballer who plays for Grays Athletic as a midfielder.

== Club career ==
He began his career at Buckhurst Hill, later joining West Ham United before moving to Leyton Orient. During the 2014–15 season he scored 10 goals for Orient's youth team. Earning a one-year professional contract in the summer of 2015, Moncur made his senior debut as a half-time substitute for Sean Clohessy in Orient's 2–1 Football League Trophy defeat at Luton Town on 1 September 2015.

On 7 November 2015, Moncur made his FA Cup debut, coming on as a substitute for Jack Payne in Orient's 6–1 First Round win over Staines Town.

On 29 February 2016, Moncur went on loan to Isthmian League Premier Division club Wingate & Finchley and made his debut in the League Cup tie at Kingstonian on the same day. He scored Wingate's first goal although Kingstonian won the tie on penalties.

After another successful loan spell with Wingate & Finchley between September and October 2016, Moncur joined National League South side Bishop's Stortford on a one-month loan. A day after he joined the Hertfordshire-based side, Moncur made his debut in a 1–0 away defeat against Eastbourne Borough, playing the full 90 minutes. A week later, Moncur scored his first goal for Bishop's Stortford, in a 2–1 victory over Weston-super-Mare. On 17 November 2016, Moncur's loan spell at Bishop's Stortford was extended for a further three months, but he was recalled to Orient prior to their match against Barnet on 7 January, after club captain Robbie Weir suffered a long-term injury. Moncur made his Football League debut as a second-half substitute for Sammy Moore in Orient's 4–1 defeat at Stevenage on 28 February 2017.

On 8 October 2017, Moncur returned to Bishop's Stortford on a one-month loan deal. Moncur marked his return with a goal during Bishop's Stortford 2–0 home victory over Basingstoke Town.

Moncur left Orient by mutual consent on 9 February 2018.

Five days later, Moncur returned to Wingate & Finchley for a third spell with the club, on a permanent deal.

In May 2019, Moncur joined Concord Rangers.

In July 2021 Moncur signed for Grays Athletic from Margate FC.

In June 2022, Moncur joined Bowers & Pitsea. In September 2022, Moncur joined Ware.

== Personal life ==
He is the son of former Tottenham Hotspur, Swindon Town and West Ham United midfielder John Moncur, and the younger brother of Leyton Orient midfielder George Moncur.

He is a Christian.

== Career statistics ==
As of match played 1 November 2020

Appearances and goals by club, season and competition
Club	Season	League			FA Cup		League Cup		Other		Total	
Club	Season	Division	Apps	Goals	Apps	Goals	Apps	Goals	Apps	Goals	Apps	Goals
Leyton Orient	2015–16	League Two	0	0	1	0	0	0	1 (Note: Appearance(s) in Football League Trophy)	0	2	0
Leyton Orient	2016–17	League Two	9	0	—		0	0	0	0	9	0
Leyton Orient	2017–18	National League	0	0	0	0	—		0	0	0	0
Leyton Orient	Total		9	0	1	0	0	0	1	0	11	0
Wingate & Finchley (loan)	2015–16	Isthmian League Premier Division	1	0	—		—		1 (Note: Appearance(s) in Isthmian League Cup)	1	2	1
Wingate & Finchley (loan)	2016–17	Isthmian League Premier Division	4	3	1	0	—		1	0	6	3
Bishop's Stortford (loan)	2016–17	National League South	8	1	—		—		3 (Note: 2 appearances in Herts Senior Cup, 1 appearance and 1 goal in FA Trophy)	1	11	2
Bishop's Stortford (loan)	2017–18	Southern League Premier Division	12	3	0	0	—		2 (Note: Appearance(s) in FA Trophy)	0	14	3
Bishop's Stortford (loan)	Total		20	4	0	0	—		5	1	25	5
Wingate & Finchley	2017–18	Isthmian League Premier Division	13	0	—		—		—		13	0
Wingate & Finchley	Total		18	3	1	0	—		2	1	21	4
East Thurrock United	2018–19	National League South	11	1	0	0	—		0	0	11	1
Ebbsfleet United	2018–19	National League	4	0	0	0	—		0	0	4	0
Concord Rangers	2019–20	National League South	5	0	—		—		0	0	5	0
Cheshunt (loan)	2019–20	Isthmian League Premier Division	10	1	2	0	—		1	0	13	1
Romford	2019–20	Isthmian League North Division	4	1	—		—		1	0	5	1
Harlow Town	2019–20	Isthmian League South Central Division	6	1	—		—		—		6	1
Margate	2020–21	Isthmian League Premier Division	9	0	1	0	—		1	0	11	0
Career total			96	11	4	0	0	0	11	2	111	13
