= The Recruit (film) =

2003 American spy film by Roger Donaldson

- Theatrical release poster
- Directed by: Roger Donaldson
- Written by: Roger Towne; Kurt Wimmer; Mitch Glazer
- Produced by: Jeff Apple; Gary Barber; Roger Birnbaum
- Starring: Al Pacino; Colin Farrell; Bridget Moynahan; Gabriel Macht
- Cinematography: Stuart Dryburgh
- Edited by: David Rosenbloom
- Music by: Klaus Badelt
- Production companies: Touchstone Pictures; Spyglass Entertainment
- Distributed by: Buena Vista Pictures Distribution
- Release dates: January 25, 2003 (Febio Film Festival); January 31, 2003 (United States)
- Running time: 115 minutes
- Country: United States
- Language: English
- Budget: $46 million
- Box office: $101.2 million

The Recruit is a 2003 American spy thriller film directed by Roger Donaldson and starring Al Pacino, Colin Farrell and Bridget Moynahan. The film was produced by Spyglass Entertainment in association with Epsilon Motion Pictures and Place Productions, and released by Touchstone Pictures through Buena Vista Pictures Distribution on January 31, 2003. It received mixed reviews from critics, but grossed $101.2 million worldwide.

== Plot ==
While studying nonlinear cryptography at MIT, James Clayton helps to create "Spartacus", a surveillance program that can enslave any computer's audiovisual hardware. Showcasing the software at a campus job fair, James impresses Bill Rudolph, a representative from Dell, and is later approached by Walter Burke, who recruits James to join the Central Intelligence Agency.

Hoping to find answers to his father Edward's mysterious death in a plane crash in Peru years ago, James passes the initial security screenings and is bused with the rest of his class to the Farm in rural Virginia, where they undergo training as prospective CIA operatives. James develops an attraction to fellow trainee Layla Moore and a rivalry with Zack, his competition for top of the class, while Burke eventually confirms that Edward was a spy.

During a public training exercise, James and Layla are abducted by masked assailants, and James is isolated, tortured and interrogated about the Farm and his instructors. After resisting for days, James breaks when he is told about Layla's brutal treatment, and he gives up Burke's name. The experience is revealed to be an exercise observed by the class, including Layla; James has failed and is removed from the Farm.

Burke seeks a despondent James and explains that his discharge was merely a cover story; that he has been selected as a non-official cover operative (NOC) tasked to investigate Layla, who Burke suspects is a sleeper agent working to steal the CIA computer virus "ICE-9", which transmits via the electrical grid and could disable all electrical devices on the planet, thus behaving similarly to the particle from Kurt Vonnegut's novel Cat's Cradle.

Under the guise of working in a low-level data-entry position at CIA headquarters, James reunites with Layla, who now works in the agency's Directorate of Science & Technology, and they begin a romantic relationship. He discovers evidence of ICE-9 on her computer, so Burke gives him a sidearm. Evading a bug planted by Layla, James witnesses her passing a message to another agent at Union Station. He follows the agent, leading to a shootout, and the man is killed in the scuffle and revealed to be Zack.

James informs Burke and offers to bring in Layla, running her off the road and confronting her at gunpoint. Layla tells James that he is not a NOC, that Zack is, and that she was officially tasked by the agency to steal ICE-9 as part of assessing their security protocols. Letting Layla go, James confronts Burke, who claims that his gun is loaded with blanks, and that Zack's death was faked. However, the gun goes off, proving that Burke is the real traitor.

Burke pursues James through an abandoned warehouse, taunting him with an explanation of his plan to manipulate James into acquiring ICE-9 for Burke to sell for $3 million, while incriminating James as a failed operative gone rogue, and declaring that James's father was never an agent. James sets up a laptop that runs Spartacus, which fails to connect but leads Burke to believe that it has successfully transmitted his confession to the agency.

Chasing James outside, Burke is met by a CIA strike team led by Farm instructor Dennis Slayne. Believing that they are there to arrest him, Burke launches into a tirade revealing his grievances against the agency, as well as his own crimes, and Slayne directs the team to target Burke instead. Realizing that he has incriminated himself, Burke raises his empty gun and is shot dead. After a tearful embrace with Layla, James is driven to headquarters for a debriefing with Slayne, who alludes that Edward was a fellow agent after all.

== Cast ==
- Al Pacino as Walter Burke
- Colin Farrell as James Clayton
- Bridget Moynahan as Layla
- Gabriel Macht as Zack
- Karl Pruner as Dennis Slayne
- Eugene Lipinski as Husky man

== Production ==
Development on the film was first announced in August 1998. The film was produced by Gary Barber's and Roger Birnbaum's production company Spyglass Entertainment, with financial support from Disney's Touchstone Pictures and German film financing company Epsilon Motion Pictures (which was owned by the Kirch Group at the time). Filming began on December 3, 2001. It was filmed mainly in Toronto and Niagara-on-the-Lake in Canada, with some landmark scenes, such as that from the Iwo Jima Memorial by the Arlington National Cemetery, shot in and around Washington, D.C. The film's working title was The Farm. James Foley was considered to direct, but was replaced by Roger Donaldson before filming began.

A video game adaptation was proposed by Torus Games for BAM! Entertainment, but the game was retooled into Ice Nine before release.

== Reception ==
=== Box office ===
The film was released on January 31, 2003, and earned $16.3 million in its first weekend, beating out Darkness Falls, Final Destination 2 and Biker Boyz to reach the number one spot. In the United States and Canada, The Recruit grossed $52.8 million, with $48.4 million in other territories, for a worldwide total of $101.2 million, against a budget of $46 million. Its opening at No. 1 was its first of three consecutive weeks in the Top 10 at the domestic box office.

=== Critical response ===
On the review aggregator website Rotten Tomatoes, 43% of 164 critics' reviews are positive, with an average rating of 5.9/10. The website's consensus reads: "This polished thriller is engaging until it takes one twist too many into the predictable." Metacritic, which uses a weighted average, assigned the film a score of 56 out of 100, based on 36 critics, indicating "mixed or average" reviews.

Owen Gleiberman of Entertainment Weekly gave the film a positive review, with a B+ score. He wrote, "From the get-go, The Recruit is one of those thrillers that delights in pulling the rug out from under you, only to find another rug below that." Carla Meyer of San Francisco Chronicle gave a positive review to the film, stating Al Pacino and Colin Farrell "bring a wary curiosity to their early scenes, with Farrell displaying a palpable hunger for praise and Pacino a corresponding mastery of how to hook somebody by parceling out compliments. They're a swarthier version of Robert Redford and Brad Pitt in Spy Game–only The Recruit is more about mind games."

Todd McCarthy of Variety stated, "The whole picture may be hokey, but the first part is agreeably so, the second part not. At the very least, one comes away with a new appreciation of the difficulty of interoffice romance at the CIA." Mike Clark of USA Today gave a mixed review to the film, stating, "Nothing is ever what it seems, but still, nothing's very compelling in The Recruit, a less-than-middling melodrama whose subject matter and talent never click as much as its credits portend."

=== CIA reaction ===
In 2009, the movie was reviewed by new CIA employees, who wrote that although "everyone in the Agency believes the movie is ridiculous", the movie is "entertaining", and that "all of the covert service trainees watched the film on the bus going into training" for "comic relief". According to T.J. Waters (a former Farm student), The Recruit is "a mediocre movie" in which he "recognize[s] a lot of similarities with the real Farm".
