= Aron Pollock =

English footballer

Personal information
- Full name: Aron Dean Pollock
- Date of birth: 23 March 1998 (age 28)
- Place of birth: Basildon, England
- Height: 6 ft 0 in (1.83 m)
- Position: Defender

Team information
- Current team: Billericay Town

Youth career
- –2016: Leyton Orient

Senior career*
Years	Team	Apps	(Gls)
2016–2018	Leyton Orient	11	(0)
2016	→ Wingate & Finchley (loan)	3	(0)
2017	→ Wealdstone (loan)	3	(0)
2017–2018	→ Leatherhead (loan)	11	(0)
2018	Leatherhead	5	(2)
2018–	Concord Rangers	131	(12)
2023–	Billericay Town	18	(1)
- * Club domestic league appearances and goals as of 11:14, 7 April 2025 (UTC)

Aron Dean Pollock (born 23 March 1998) is an English professional footballer who plays for Brentwood Town, as a defender.

== Club career ==
Drafted into the Leyton Orient first team squad during early 2016, Pollock went on a work experience loan to Isthmian League club Wingate & Finchley on 4 March 2016.

Pollock made his Orient first team debut on 30 April in the starting lineup for the final home match of the season, against Mansfield Town. Pollock impressed in his opening performance, being voted Man of the Match and subsequently starting in the following match against Yeovil, in the final match of the season.

Following a short-term loan spell at National League South side Wealdstone, Pollock joined Isthmian League Premier Division side Leatherhead on a one-month loan in December 2017. He went onto feature eleven times before making his spell permanent, following his release from Leyton Orient.

Prior to the 2018–19 campaign, Pollock reunited with former manager, Sammy Moore at Concord Rangers and went onto make his debut against Gloucester City. In May 2023, he joined Billericay Town following Concord's relegation.

== Career statistics ==
As of match played 31 March 2018.

Club	Season	League			FA Cup		League Cup		Other		Total	
Club	Season	Division	Apps	Goals	Apps	Goals	Apps	Goals	Apps	Goals	Apps	Goals
Leyton Orient	2015–16	League Two	2	0	0	0	0	0	0	0	2	0
Leyton Orient	2016–17	League Two	9	0	0	0	1	0	3 (Note: Appearance(s) in EFL Trophy)	0	13	0
Leyton Orient	2017–18	National League	0	0	0	0	—		0	0	0	0
Leyton Orient	Total		11	0	0	0	1	0	3	0	15	0
Wingate & Finchley (loan)	2016–17	Isthmian League Premier Division	3	0	0	0	—		0	0	3	0
Wealdstone (loan)	2017–18	National League South	3	0	0	0	—		0	0	3	0
Leatherhead (loan)	2017–18	Isthmian League Premier Division	11	0	—		—		0	0	11	0
Leatherhead	2017–18	Isthmian League Premier Division	5	2	—		—		0	0	5	2
Concord Rangers	2018–19	National League South	1	0	0	0	—		0	0	1	0
Career total			34	2	0	0	1	0	3	0	38	2

== Honours ==
Concord Rangers

- FA Trophy runner-up: 2019–20
