= Paul McCallum =

Paul McCallum may refer to:

- Paul McCallum (gridiron football) (born 1970), Canadian football player
- Paul McCallum (footballer) (born 1993), English footballer
