= Michael Clarke =

Michael or Mike Clarke may refer to:

- J. Michael Clarke, British acoustic and electroacoustic musician
- Michael Clarke (skier) (born 1970), Australia's first world champion in a winter sport
- Michael Clarke (academic), British academic who specialises in defence studies
- Michael Clarke (Australian politician) (1915–2002), member of the Victorian Legislative Council
- Michael Clarke (Barbadian cricketer) (1913–1982)
- Michael Clarke (Canadian politician) (1861–1926), a Progressive Conservative Party of Canada candidate
- Michael Clarke (cricketer) (born 1981), former captain of the Australian national cricket team
- Michael Clarke (musician) (1946–1993), American musician
- Michael Clarke (ornithologist), Australian ornithologist
- Michael Clarke (priest) (1935–1978), Anglican provost
- Michael Clarke Duncan (1957–2012), American actor
- Mike Clarke (ice hockey, born 1953), Canadian ice hockey player
- Michael Clarke (jockey), Australian jockey
- Michael E. Clarke, Australian political scientist
- Mick Clarke, British guitarist, member of Killing Floor

== See also ==
- Michael Clark (disambiguation)
