= Sam Sargeant =

English footballer

- Sargeant at Leyton Orient in 2017

Personal information
- Full name: Sam Joseph Dennis Sargeant
- Date of birth: 23 September 1997 (age 29)
- Place of birth: Greenwich, England
- Height: 6 ft 2 in (1.87 m)
- Position: Goalkeeper

Team information
- Current team: Bohemians

Youth career
- –2015: Leyton Orient

Senior career*
Years	Team	Apps	(Gls)
2015–2023	Leyton Orient	32	(0)
2015–2016	→ Redbridge (loan)	3	(0)
2018	→ Margate (loan)	4	(0)
2018	→ Leatherhead (loan)	4	(0)
2021	→ Barnet (loan)	10	(0)
2022	→ Wealdstone (loan)	1	(0)
2023–2024	Waterford	45	(0)
2025–2026	Sligo Rovers	60	(0)
2027–	Bohemians	0	(0)
- * Club domestic league appearances and goals as of 18:44, 18 November 2026 (UTC)

Sam Joseph Dennis Sargeant (born 23 September 1997) is an English professional footballer who plays as a goalkeeper for League of Ireland Premier Division club Bohemians.

== Early life ==
Sargeant was born in Greenwich, London.

== Career ==
In November 2015, after featuring on the bench for Leyton Orient, Sargeant joined Redbridge on a work experience loan. Sargeant made his first-team debut, and kept a clean sheet, in Orient's 1–0 win away to Yeovil Town on 7 May 2016. After spending most of the 2016–17 season on Orient's substitutes' bench as back-up to Alex Cisak, Sargeant made his second appearance in the 2–1 defeat at home to Carlisle United on 4 February 2017.

In early January 2018, Sargeant moved to Isthmian League Premier Division club Margate on a 28-day loan. After four appearances, keeping two clean sheets, he was recalled to Orient after Dean Brill picked up an injury in training.

On 9 February, Sargeant signed on loan to Leatherhead until the end of the 2017–18 season. He joined Barnet on loan for the first two months of the 2021–22 National League season, returning to Orient after ten appearances.

On 11 January 2022, Sargeant joined National League side Wealdstone on a seven-day emergency loan deal due to a suspension to first choice goalkeeper George Wickens. His sole appearance came in a 1–0 defeat away to Boreham Wood before leaving the club later that week.

On 1 July 2022, Sargeant signed a new one-year contract to stay at Leyton Orient. Manager Richie Wellens said, "Sometimes when you're looking for a number two keeper, chemistry is important. Sarge is a really good character, trains very well, and can be relied upon if we need him."

On 19 July 2023, Sargeant signed for League of Ireland First Division club Waterford. He made 18 appearances in all competitions as his side were promoted to the League of Ireland Premier Division. The 2024 season saw him feature in 30 of the club's 36 league games as they finished in a respectable seventh place in their first season back in the top flight, comfortably avoiding the relegation places.

On 9 January 2025, Sargeant signed as a free agent for fellow League of Ireland Premier Division club Sligo Rovers. On 8 August 2025, he extended his contract until the end of the 2026 season. Sargeant made 33 appearances in all competitions in 2026 as the club finished bottom of the league and were relegated to play in the League of Ireland First Division for the first time since 2006, with the club confirming at the end of the season that he would be leaving following the end of his contract.

On 18 November 2026, he signed for his third League of Ireland Premier Division club Bohemians ahead of the 2027 season.

== Career statistics ==
As of match played 11 September 2026

Appearances and goals by club, season and competition
Club	Season	League			National Cup		League Cup		Other		Total	
Club	Season	Division	Apps	Goals	Apps	Goals	Apps	Goals	Apps	Goals	Apps	Goals
Leyton Orient	2014–15	League One	0	0	0	0	0	0	0	0	0	0
Leyton Orient	2015–16	League Two	1	0	0	0	0	0	0	0	1	0
Leyton Orient	2016–17	League Two	15	0	0	0	1	0	2 (Note: Appearances in EFL Trophy)	0	18	0
Leyton Orient	2017–18	National League	3	0	0	0	0	0	0	0	3	0
Leyton Orient	2018–19	National League	0	0	0	0	0	0	0	0	0	0
Leyton Orient	2019–20	League Two	12	0	1	0	0	0	4	0	17	0
Leyton Orient	2020–21	League Two	0	0	0	0	0	0	4	0	4	0
Leyton Orient	2021–22	League Two	0	0	0	0	0	0	0	0	0	0
Leyton Orient	2022–23	League Two	1	0	0	0	0	0	3	0	4	0
Leyton Orient	Total		32	0	1	0	1	0	13	0	47	0
Margate (loan)	2017–18	Isthmian League Premier Division	4	0	0	0	–		0	0	4	0
Leatherhead (loan)	2017–18	Isthmian League Premier Division	4	0	0	0	–		0	0	4	0
Barnet (loan)	2021–22	National League	10	0	0	0	–		0	0	10	0
Wealdstone (loan)	2021–22	National League	1	0	0	0	–		0	0	1	0
Waterford	2023	League of Ireland First Division	13	0	2	0	–		3 (Note: Appearances in 2023 League of Ireland First Division Play-offs)	0	18	0
Waterford	2024	League of Ireland Premier Division	30	0	1	0	–		0 (Note: Appearances in Munster Senior Cup)	0	31	0
Waterford	Total		43	0	3	0	–		3	0	49	0
Sligo Rovers	2025	League of Ireland Premier Division	30	0	3	0	–		–		33	0
Sligo Rovers	2026	League of Ireland Premier Division	30	0	3	0	–		–		33	0
Sligo Rovers	Total		60	0	6	0	–		–		66	0
Career total			154	0	10	0	1	0	16	0	181	0

== Honours ==
Leyton Orient

- FA Trophy runner-up: 2018–19
