= George Moncur =

English footballer (born 1993)

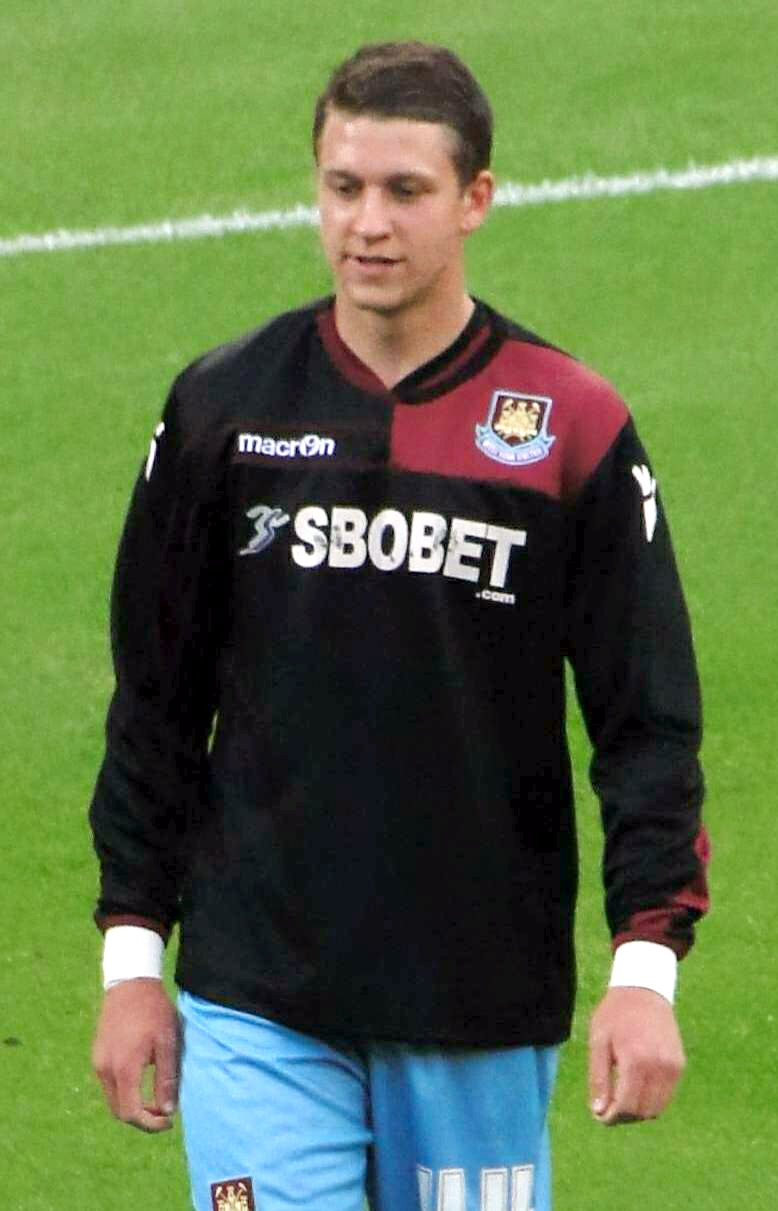
- Moncur warming up for West Ham United in 2011

Personal information
- Full name: George Anthony Moncur
- Date of birth: 18 August 1993 (age 33)
- Place of birth: Swindon, England
- Height: 5 ft 9 in (1.76 m)
- Position: Midfielder

Team information
- Current team: Bedford Town
- Number: 10

Youth career
- Buckhurst Hill
- –2007: Tottenham Hotspur
- 2007–2011: West Ham United

Senior career*
Years	Team	Apps	(Gls)
2011–2014	West Ham United	0	(0)
2012	→ AFC Wimbledon (loan)	20	(2)
2014	→ Partick Thistle (loan)	2	(1)
2014	→ Colchester United (loan)	17	(3)
2014–2016	Colchester United	69	(17)
2016–2019	Barnsley	67	(5)
2016–2017	→ Peterborough United (loan)	13	(2)
2019–2021	Luton Town	52	(10)
2021–2022	Hull City	14	(0)
2022–2025	Leyton Orient	78	(13)
2024–2025	→ Southend United (loan)	13	(0)
2025	→ Ebbsfleet United (loan)	13	(2)
2025–2026	Ebbsfleet United	22	(1)
2026	→ Bedford Town (loan)	15	(3)
2026–	Bedford Town	5	(2)

International career
- England U17
2010–2011	England U18	2	(0)
- * Club domestic league appearances and goals as of 18:58, 10 August 2026 (UTC)

George Anthony Moncur (born 18 August 1993) is an English professional footballer who plays as a midfielder for National League North side Bedford Town.

The son of former West Ham United midfielder John, Moncur came through the West Ham United Academy after a spell with Tottenham Hotspur as a schoolboy. He made his professional debut in January 2012 when he joined League Two club AFC Wimbledon on loan. He made the first of his two appearances for the West Ham first team in August 2012 in the League Cup, with his second arriving in January 2014. He then joined Scottish Premiership club Partick Thistle on loan, before signing for League One team Colchester United on loan for six months in August 2014. He signed a permanent contract with Colchester in November 2014. After scoring 23 goals in 97 appearances in two spells for Colchester, Moncur moved to Championship team Barnsley in June 2016. He spent two and a half seasons with Barnsley, including a loan spell with Peterborough United, before joining Luton Town in January 2019.

Moncur has represented England at under-17 and under-18 levels.

== Club career ==
=== West Ham United ===
Like his father John, Moncur began his career with Tottenham Hotspur as a schoolboy, where he progressed through the club's academy until he was 13 years old. Born in Swindon, Wiltshire, he was brought up in Loughton, Essex, and studied at Roding Valley High School, playing for local club Buckhurst Hill. He began as a full-time scholar at the West Ham United academy in 2009. Having already played and scored for the under-16 team, he scored his first goal for the under-18s at the age of 15 on 22 July 2009, scoring a late equaliser in their 2–2 draw with Tiptree United. He made his debut for the West Ham reserve team on 24 February 2010 in a 2–1 win over their Chelsea counterparts. Moncur earned his first professional deal in September 2010, signing a three-year deal after becoming a regular in Tony Carr's under-18 team and breaking into Alex Dyer's reserve team. He was called up to the first-team for the first time for West Ham's home tie against Aldershot Town in the League Cup on 24 January 2011. He was an unused substitute in the 2–1 defeat.

==== AFC Wimbledon loan ====
Moncur joined League Two club AFC Wimbledon on a one-month loan deal in January 2012. He had been a regular for West Ham's development squad until his loan, scoring three goals in 20 games. He made his professional debut for Wimbledon on 14 January, starting in their 2–1 win over Port Vale at Vale Park. After making four appearances and with his loan expiring on 4 February, Moncur expressed a desire to extend his stay with the Kingsmeadow club. He extended his stay for a further month ahead of their game at Northampton Town on 13 February. His loan was extended for a third month on 12 March having made 10 appearances.

Moncur scored his first professional goal on 24 March when Wimbledon beat Burton Albion 4–0 at home. His loan was extended a third and final time until the end of the season on 9 April. He curled in the second goal of his loan spell on 21 April as the Dons defeated Torquay United 2–0. He made 20 appearances for Wimbledon during his loan, scoring twice.

Prior to the end of Moncur's loan, Wimbledon boss Terry Brown had hoped to bring the player back to the club for the 2012–13 season, but later ruled out a move after West Ham looked to have Moncur available for pre-season.

==== 2012–13 season ====
Moncur made his debut for West Ham on 29 August 2012 when he came on as an 84th-minute substitute for Kevin Nolan in their 2–0 win over Crewe Alexandra. He was an unused substitute in five Premier League games in November and December 2012. Across the season, he made 28 Professional Development League appearances, scoring in victories at Everton in August 2012 and at home to Southampton in April 2013. Academy director Tony Carr named Moncur 'Young Hammer of the Year' at the end of the season.

==== 2013–14 season ====
West Ham manager Sam Allardyce allowed Moncur to train with Notts County for the club to cast an eye over him with a view to a loan move in November 2013. The move never materialised, before Moncur made his first and only start for the Hammers in their 5–0 defeat to Nottingham Forest in the FA Cup on 5 January 2014.

==== Partick Thistle loan ====
On 31 January 2014, Moncur joined Scottish Premiership team Partick Thistle on loan. He joined until the end of the season, but was confined to appearances in the under-21 team during the early stages of his loan. He eventually made his debut as an 80th-minute substitute for Lyle Taylor in their 1–0 defeat to Inverness Caledonian Thistle on 22 March. His second and final appearance for the Jags was a goalscoring one, netting five minutes after replacing Chris Erskine in the 73rd minute of their 3–2 home defeat by Ross County on 10 May.

==== Colchester United loan ====
Having spent the 2014–15 pre-season training with Colchester United, Moncur signed for the League One club ahead of the new season on 7 August, and would run until 11 January 2015. He made a goalscoring debut for Colchester on 9 August, coming off the bench to secure a point for his team in their 2–2 opening day draw with Oldham Athletic. He had replaced Craig Eastmond early in the first-half due to injury. He scored again on his first league start for the club on 16 August in their 2–1 defeat at Bristol City. Moncur scored the third goal of his loan when he opened the scoring in the U's 3–2 defeat to Sheffield United at the Colchester Community Stadium.

Having been brought into the club by Joe Dunne, following his departure as manager, Moncur became a regular fixture in new manager Tony Humes starting line-up. After claiming a man of the match award in Colchester's 0–0 draw with Bradford City, Moncur said that he was "really enjoying playing under the new manager". On 14 November, after making 20 appearances for Colchester in all competitions, it was reported that Moncur was on the verge of signing a loan extension to remain with the club past January.

=== Colchester United ===
==== 2014–15 season ====
Moncur joined Colchester United on a permanent transfer for an undisclosed fee on 18 November 2014, signing a contract until 2017. He admitted there was "some sadness about leaving West Ham... but I've got a new challenge in front of me now". His father John approved of the move, saying that "in terms of his football education, this is the right move for George". Manager Tony Humes described Moncur as a "great role model for all the kids at the club, because he works so hard, day in, day out."

He made his second debut for the club in their 1–0 home defeat to Coventry City on 22 November. He scored his fourth goal of the season as an added-time winner against Peterborough United in the FA Cup second round on 7 December as he scored from the edge of the box. He scored his first goal since joining permanently on 21 March 2015, handing Colchester the lead with the opening goal in a 2–2 draw with Gillingham at Priestfield. He scored once again in his next game on 3 April, opening the scoring for Colchester with a low shot on 57 minutes as his team defeated Port Vale 2–1. He scored his third goal in as many games on 6 April to seal a 3–1 victory over Barnsley, sending Gavin Massey's pass into the back of the net on 86 minutes. Moncur scored his eighth goal of the season when he scored the opening goal in Colchester's 3–2 win over Fleetwood Town on 25 April at Highbury Stadium. He scored the decisive goal in the closing fixture of the 2014–15 season when he fired home Chris Porter's lay-off from the centre of the box in the 82nd minute of Colchester's 1–0 win over Preston North End on 3 May, a result which secured Colchester's League One status for another season.

Moncur described scoring the winner and aiding Colchester's survival bid as "unreal". He added that "God has a plan for me and I always knew something like this was going to happen" after meeting a "modern-day prophet" at his church in Loughton.

==== 2015–16 season ====
In his fourth league appearance of the season, Moncur scored his first goal on 29 August 2015. He reduced the deficit to 2–1 in a 2–2 draw against Scunthorpe United with an assist from Gavin Massey. He scored his second of the season after coming on as a first-half substitute for Joe Edwards during a 3–3 draw with Chesterfield on 12 September. In his next game, three days after the Chesterfield draw, Moncur scored twice to hand Colchester a 2–0 lead at half time in a game they would eventually win 3–2 against Sheffield United at Bramall Lane. He scored his fifth goal in eight league games after just three minutes of Colchester's 2–1 win over Swindon Town at the County Ground on 26 September.

On the back of his four goals in four games during September, Moncur, alongside Colchester teammate Jamie Jones, were shortlisted for the PFA Fans Player of the Month award for League One. He was named winner of the award on 6 October, fending off competition from fellow finalists Adam Armstrong of Coventry City and Burton Albion's Stuart Beavon.

Moncur scored his first goal in a month on 24 October during Colchester's 4–4 home draw with Walsall. He scored his seventh goal of the season during Colchester's 6–2 win at Wealdstone in the FA Cup on 7 November, before scoring his 20th professional goal during Colchester's 3–2 home defeat by Crewe Alexandra on 24 November. He then scored in another 3–2 home defeat, this time at the hands of Barnsley on 12 December to bring his goal tally to nine for the season. Moncur scored his first goal of 2016 and his tenth of the season on 9 January during Colchester's 2–1 FA Cup third round win against Charlton Athletic. He opened the scoring in the 28th minute, before turning provider for Marvin Sordell to score the U's second.

After a goalless spell of two months, Moncur scored from the penalty spot to put the U's 3–2 ahead in a 3–3 home draw with Wigan Athletic on 12 March. He then scored Colchester's consolation goal in their 4–1 home defeat by Peterborough on 16 April, before converting from the penalty spot in the U's 1–1 draw with Crewe at Gresty Road on 19 April. Despite Colchester's eventual relegation from League One, Moncur continued his goalscoring with the opener in the U's 2–2 draw with Barnsley at Oakwell in their penultimate game of the season on 30 April. His campaign ended with 14 goals in 51 appearances for Colchester.

=== Barnsley ===
Barnsley signed Moncur from Colchester on 21 June 2016 for an undisclosed fee, reported to be £500,000.

On 31 August 2016, Moncur joined Peterborough United on loan until 7 January 2017. On 3 September 2016, he made his Peterborough debut coming on as a substitute in a 2–2 home draw against Swindon Town. A week later he scored his first goals for Peterborough when he scored twice in a 2–2 draw with Port Vale on 10 September 2016.

Upon his return to Barnsley he scored his first goal for the club in a 3–2 defeat at Bristol City on 22 April 2017.

=== Luton Town ===
Luton Town announced the signing of Moncur on 18 January 2019 for an undisclosed fee. He scored the winning goal, a "stunning" free kick, in Luton's 3–2 victory over Portsmouth on 29 January 2019 that sent the club five points clear at the top of the League One table. Moncur was released by Luton at the end of the 2020–21 season, having made 59 appearances and scored 11 goals in two and a half seasons.

=== Hull City ===
Moncur agreed a two-year contract with newly promoted Championship club Hull City on 7 June 2021, with the option of a further year, effective once his Luton contract had expired at the end of that month. He made his debut for Hull City on 7 August 2021, in a 4–1 away win over Preston North End.

=== Leyton Orient ===
Leyton Orient announced the signing of Moncur on a three-year contract on 29 June 2022 for an undisclosed fee.

==== Southend United (loan) ====
On 20 August 2024, Moncur joined National League club Southend United on a season-long loan deal.

=== Ebbsfleet United ===
On 7 January 2025, Moncur had his loan with Southend United terminated, joining National League bottom side Ebbsfleet United on loan for the remainder of the season, joining them permanently on 21 March 2025.

=== Bedford Town ===
On 3 February 2026, Moncur joined National League North side Bedford Town on a one-month loan deal.

On 6 June 2026, he returned to Bedford Town on a permanent one-year deal.

== International career ==
Having made appearances for England at under-17 level, Moncur made his debut for the England under-18s on 16 November 2010 in a 3–0 win against Poland at Adams Park, High Wycombe. He made two appearances for the under-18s, with his second game played against Italy on 12 April 2011.

== Personal life ==
Moncur is the son of former Tottenham Hotspur, Swindon Town and West Ham midfielder John Moncur, and the older brother of former Leyton Orient midfielder Freddy Moncur. He carries a tattoo dedicated to his former West Ham teammate Dylan Tombides, who died in April 2014 from testicular cancer. He is a devout Christian.

== Career statistics ==
As of 7 January 2025

Appearances and goals by club, season and competition
Club	Season	League			National Cup		League Cup		Other		Total	
Club	Season	Division	Apps	Goals	Apps	Goals	Apps	Goals	Apps	Goals	Apps	Goals
West Ham United	2011–12	Championship	0	0	0	0	0	0	0	0	0	0
West Ham United	2012–13	Premier League	0	0	0	0	1	0	—		1	0
West Ham United	2013–14	Premier League	0	0	1	0	0	0	—		1	0
West Ham United	Total		0	0	1	0	1	0	0	0	2	0
AFC Wimbledon (loan)	2011–12	League Two	20	2	—		—		—		20	2
Partick Thistle (loan)	2013–14	Scottish Premiership	2	1	—		—		—		2	1
Colchester United	2014–15	League One	41	8	3	1	1	0	1 (Note: Appearance in Football League Trophy)	0	46	9
Colchester United	2015–16	League One	45	12	4	2	1	0	1	0	51	14
Colchester United	Total		86	20	7	3	2	0	2	0	97	23
Barnsley	2016–17	Championship	12	2	0	0	1	0	—		13	2
Barnsley	2017–18	Championship	34	2	1	0	3	0	—		38	2
Barnsley	2018–19	League One	21	1	2	0	1	1	3 (Note: Appearances in EFL Trophy)	3	27	5
Barnsley	Total		67	5	3	0	5	1	3	3	78	9
Peterborough United (loan)	2016–17	League One	13	2	0	0	—		2	1	15	3
Luton Town	2018–19	League One	14	6	—		—		—		14	6
Luton Town	2019–20	Championship	17	1	1	0	2	0	—		20	1
Luton Town	2020–21	Championship	21	3	2	1	2	0	—		25	4
Luton Town	Total		52	10	3	1	4	0	—		59	11
Hull City	2021–22	Championship	14	0	1	0	1	0	—		16	0
Leyton Orient	2022–23	League Two	43	9	1	0	1	0	—		45	9
Leyton Orient	2023–24	League One	35	4	2	0	1	0	3	0	41	4
Leyton Orient	2024–25	League One	0	0	0	0	0	0	0	0	0	0
Leyton Orient	Total		78	13	3	0	2	0	3	0	86	13
Southend United (loan)	2024–25	National League	14	0	2	0	—		0	0	16	0
Career total			346	53	20	4	15	1	10	4	391	62

== Honours ==
Barnsley

- EFL League One runner-up: 2018–19

Luton Town

- EFL League One: 2018–19

Leyton Orient

- EFL League Two: 2022–23

Individual

- West Ham United Young Player of the Year: 2012–13
