= Teddy Mézague =

French footballer (born 1990)

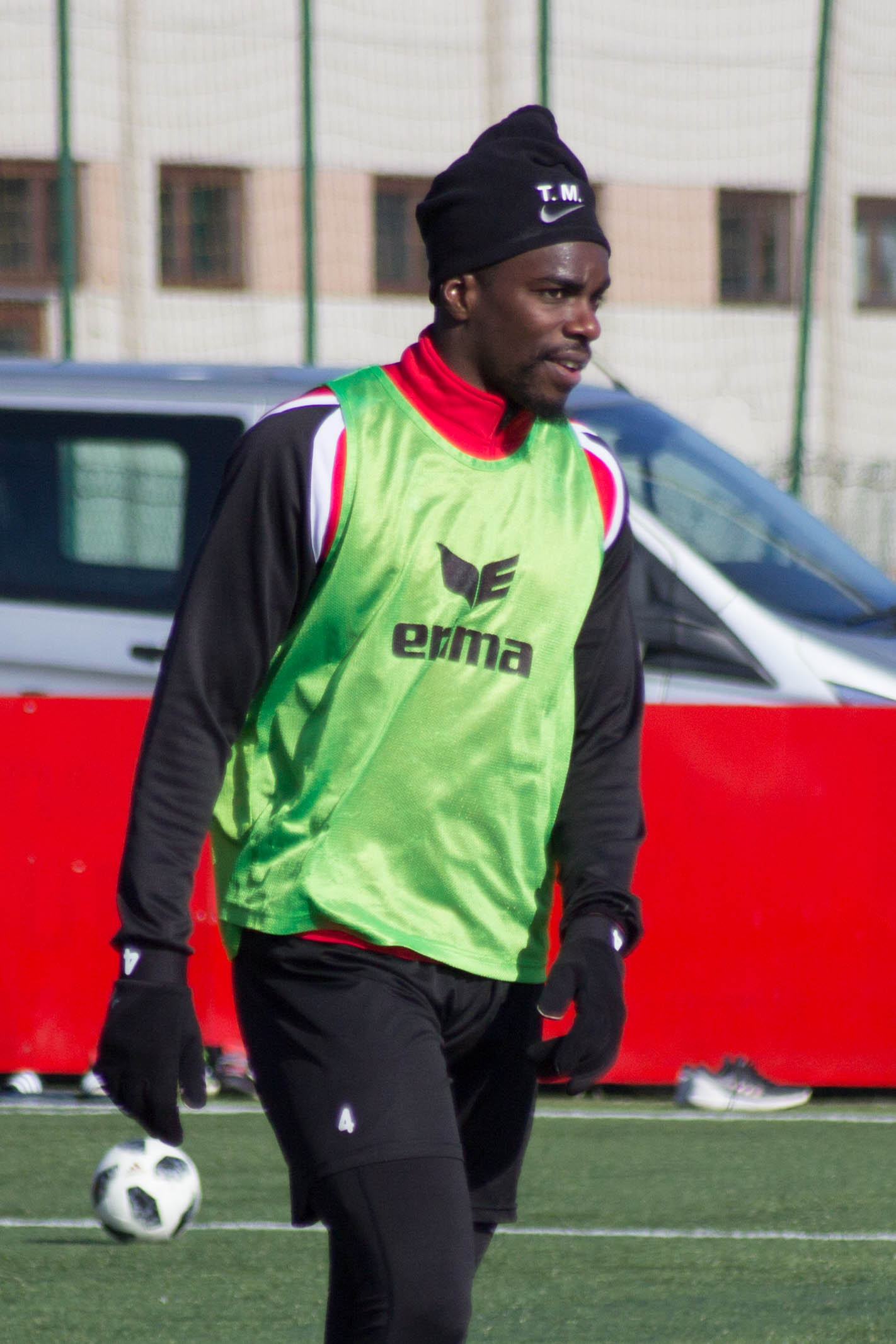
- Mézague in 2018

Personal information
- Full name: Melontsa Teddy William Mézague
- Date of birth: 27 May 1990 (age 36)
- Place of birth: Marseille, France
- Height: 1.87 m (6 ft 1 1/2 in)
- Position: Centre-back

Team information
- Current team: Virton
- Number: 5

Senior career*
Years	Team	Apps	(Gls)
2008–2014	Montpellier II	77	(7)
2010–2014	Montpellier	14	(0)
2011–2012	→ Martigues (loan)	28	(3)
2014–2016	Mouscron	59	(1)
2016–2017	Leyton Orient	17	(1)
2017–2018	Mouscron	29	(3)
2018	Dinamo București	4	(0)
2019	Hapoel Ra'anana	4	(0)
2020–2021	Beroe Stara Zagora	41	(0)
2021–2022	Eyüpspor	30	(0)
2023	Ararat Yerevan	9	(1)
2023	Ararat Yerevan II	4	(2)
2023–	Virton	44	(1)
- * Club domestic league appearances and goals as of 28 June 2026

Melontsa Teddy William Mézague (born 27 May 1990) is a French professional footballer who plays as a centre back for Belgian club Virton.

== Early and personal life ==
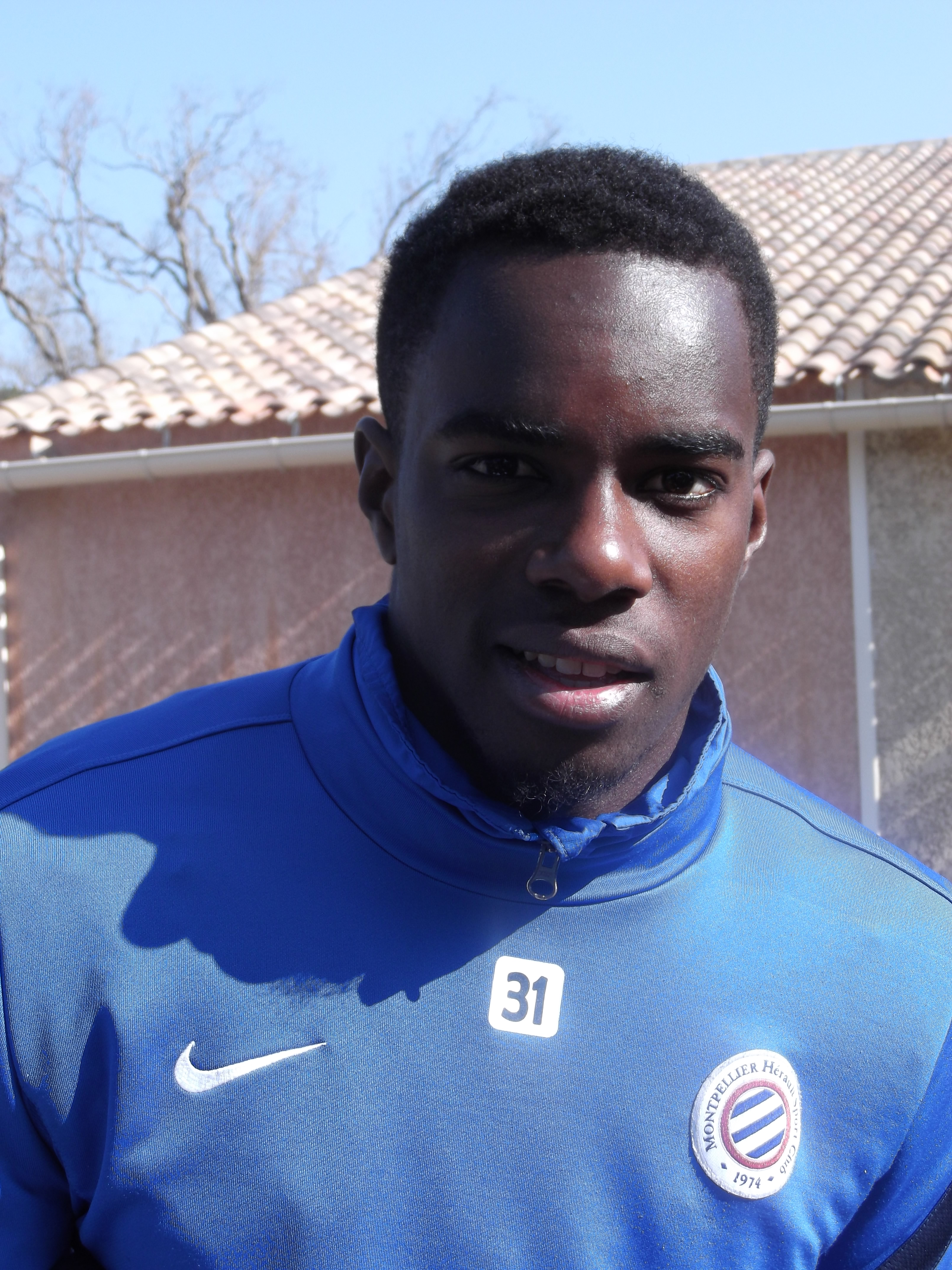
Mezague in 2013

Born in Marseille, Mézague holds both French and Cameroonian nationalities, and his older brother Valéry played for the Cameroon national team.

== Career ==
Mézague spent his early career in France with Montpellier and FC Martigues. In July 2014 he moved to Belgian club Royal Excel Mouscron, and in August 2016 he moved to English club Leyton Orient. He scored his first and only goal for Leyton Orient against Notts County on 18 February 2017.

On 12 September 2018, Mézague joined Romanian side Dinamo București on a free transfer. After leaving Dinamo in November 2019, he moved to Hapoel Ra'anana in February 2019. In January 2020, Mézague signed a contract with Bulgarian club Beroe Stara Zagora. In June 2021, he signed with Turkish side Eyüpspor, becoming the first foreign player in the club's history.

On 6 March 2023, Ararat Yerevan announced the signing of Mézague. On 20 June 2023, Ararat Yerevan confirmed the departure of Mézague.

== Career statistics ==
As of 22 April 2017

Appearances and goals by club, season and competition
Club	Season	League		National cup		League cup		Other		Total	
Club	Season	Apps	Goals	Apps	Goals	Apps	Goals	Apps	Goals	Apps	Goals
Montpellier	2010–11	0	0	0	0	0	0	0	0	0	0
Montpellier	2011–12	0	0	0	0	0	0	0	0	0	0
Montpellier	2012–13	5	0	0	0	0	0	0	0	5	0
Montpellier	2013–14	9	0	1	1	1	0	0	0	11	1
Montpellier	Total	14	0	1	1	1	0	0	0	16	1
Martigues (loan)	2011–12	28	3	0	0	0	0	0	0	28	3
Montpellier II	2012–13	11	1	0	0	0	0	0	0	11	1
Montpellier II	2013–14	16	2	0	0	0	0	0	0	16	2
Montpellier II	Total	27	3	0	0	0	0	0	0	27	3
Royal Excel Mouscron	2014–15	25	0	0	0	0	0	0	0	25	0
Royal Excel Mouscron	2015–16	34	1	3	0	0	0	0	0	37	1
Royal Excel Mouscron	Total	59	1	3	0	0	0	0	0	62	1
Leyton Orient	2016–17	17	1	0	0	0	0	0	0	17	1
Career total		145	8	4	1	1	0	0	0	150	9
