= Sandro Semedo =

Portuguese footballer

Personal information
- Full name: Sandro Emanuel Gonçalves dos Reis Pires Semedo
- Date of birth: 3 December 1996 (age 29)
- Place of birth: Haiti
- Height: 1.74 m (5 ft 8 1/2 in)
- Position: Winger

Team information
- Current team: A.O. Miltiadis

Youth career
- Ponte Frielas
- 2008–2010: Odivelas
- 2010–2012: Sacavenense
- 2012–2013: Stoke City
- 2013: Colchester United
- 2013–2015: Leyton Orient

Senior career*
Years	Team	Apps	(Gls)
2015–2017	Leyton Orient	45	(3)
2015	→ Welling United (loan)	3	(0)
2016	→ Chelmsford City (loan)	11	(0)
2018	Santarcangelo	5	(0)
2018	Zimbru Chișinău	7	(0)
2019	Dunav Ruse	4	(0)
2019	Almopos Aridaea	0	(0)
2020	Ethnikos Assias	2	(1)
2020–2021	Zalaegerszegi	8	(0)
2021–2023	Ethnikos Piraeus	0	(0)
2023	Agia Paraskevi	0	(0)
2023–2024	Espinho	3	(0)
2024	Nea Ionia	1	(0)
2024–	A.O. Miltiadis	0	(0)
- * Club domestic league appearances and goals as of 13:07, 9 November 2024 (UTC)

Sandro Emanuel Gonçalves dos Reis Pires Semedo (born 3 December 1996) is a Portuguese professional footballer who plays as a winger for Greek football club A.O. Miltiadis.

== Playing career ==
After representing lower league sides in his native country, Semedo joined Stoke City in the 2012 summer. After a short spell at Colchester United, he joined Leyton Orient's youth setup in 2013.

On 8 July 2015 Semedo was handed a two-year professional deal by the O's. He made his professional debut on 1 September, coming on as a late substitute for Ollie Palmer in a 2–1 League Trophy defeat at Luton Town.

On 1 October 2015 Semedo was loaned to National League side Welling United until 9 January 2016, but was recalled early. On 12 February 2016, Semedo joined Chelmsford City on a one-month loan deal.

He scored his first goal for Leyton Orient in an EFL Trophy tie against Stevenage on 30 August 2016.

Semedo signed for Italian Serie C club Santarcangelo in January 2018, linking up again with former Orient manager Alberto Cavasin.

On 17 October 2019, Semedo joined Almopos Aridaea in Greece. Semedo then joined Cypriot club Ethnikos Assia FC in January 2020.

On 22 October 2021, he signed for Greek club Ethnikos Piraeus and stayed there until the end of January 2023. In February 2023, he joined Agia Paraskevi football club. In the 2023 summer transfer period he joined the Portuguese side Espinho and then he was transferred to Nea Ionia football club for free. He recorded one cup appearance with Nea Ionia and then joined A.O. Miltiadis football club.
