= Michael Clarke (skier) =

Michael Andrew Clarke
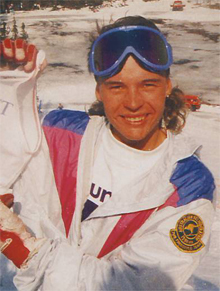
- 1989 Junior World Mogul Champion

Personal information
- Born: 24 August 1970 (age 55) Falls Creek, Victoria, Australia

Sport
- Sport: Skiing
- Club: Australian Freestyle Ski Team 1989/1994

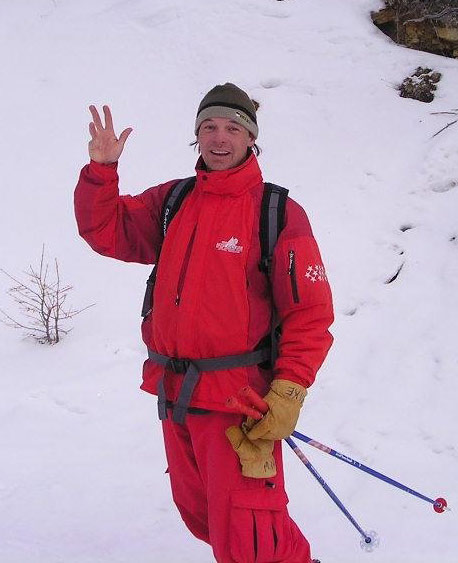
Michael Andrew Clarke continues to keep his hand in at skiing with part-time coaching in Switzerland

Michael Andrew Clarke (born 24 August 1970 in Melbourne, Australia) is a former Australian mogul skier. He won the Junior World Mogul Championships in 1989, Australia's first ever skiing world championship win. Not just Australia's first skiing world champion but Australia's first world champion in any of the winter Olympic sports.

From Falls Creek, Clarke, won the mogul event at the junior world championships in Sälen [sæːlen] locality Sweden. The only other Australian to win a world championship skiing medal was Malcolm Milne, who won a downhill bronze in 1967.

== Film ==
Clarke did stunt work for Jackie Chan in the film First Strike, produced partially at Falls Creek, as a stunt skier and snowmobiler.

== Honours ==
Clarke received an Australian Sports Medal in 2000
