= Michael Clark (English footballer) =

English footballer

Personal information
- Full name: Michael Albert Clark
- Date of birth: 5 September 1997 (age 29)
- Place of birth: Welwyn Garden City, Hertfordshire
- Position: Defender

Team information
- Current team: St Albans City
- Number: 6

Youth career
- 2005–2016: Leyton Orient

Senior career*
Years	Team	Apps	(Gls)
2016–2018	Leyton Orient	13	(0)
2016–2017	→ East Thurrock United (loan)	29	(2)
2017–2018	→ East Thurrock United (loan)	34	(0)
2018	Braintree Town	9	(0)
2018	Concord Rangers	4	(0)
2018–2019	St Albans City	23	(2)
2019–2020	Braintree Town	18	(1)
2020–	St Albans City	82	(3)
- * Club domestic league appearances and goals as of 23:22, 2 December 2021 (UTC)

Michael Clark (born 5 September 1997) is an English professional footballer who plays for St Albans City, as a defender.

== Career ==
Clark captained the Leyton Orient youth team during the 2015–16 campaign, winning the South East and West Youth Merit League.

In his first season as a pro, Clark was sent on loan to East Thurrock United at the start of the 2016–17 season, making 35 appearances in all competitions and scoring four goals. This included the second in the 2–0 win over Colchester United in their Essex Senior Cup quarter-final on 4 January 2017.

Clark was recalled from his loan and drafted into the Leyton Orient first team squad in February 2017, and made his debut as a second-half substitute for Tom Parkes in the 1–0 league defeat at home to Cheltenham Town on 25 February 2017.

A second loan spell at East Thurrock was announced on 15 December 2017, initially to run for one month.

On 29 June 2018, Clark agreed to join newly promoted National League side Braintree Town.

== Career statistics ==
As of match played 27 November 2021.

Appearances and goals by club, season and competition
Club	Season	League			FA Cup		League Cup		Other		Total	
Club	Season	Division	Apps	Goals	Apps	Goals	Apps	Goals	Apps	Goals	Apps	Goals
Leyton Orient	2016–17	League Two	9	0	0	0	0	0	0	0	9	0
Leyton Orient	2017–18	National League	1	0	2	0	—		0	0	3	0
Leyton Orient	Total		10	0	2	0	0	0	0	0	12	0
East Thurrock United (loan)	2016–17	National League South	25	2	1	0	—		4 (Note: Appearance(s) in FA Trophy)	0	30	2
East Thurrock United (loan)	2017–18	National League South	17	0	0	0	—		4	0	21	0
East Thurrock United (loan)	Total		42	2	1	0	—		8	0	51	2
Braintree Town	2018–19	National League	9	0	0	0	—		0	0	9	0
Concord Rangers	2018–19	National League South	4	0	1	0	—		0	0	5	0
St Albans City	2018–19	National League South	23	2	—		—		—		23	2
Braintree Town	2019–20	National League South	18	1	0	0	—		1	0	19	1
St Albans City	2019–20	National League South	7	0	—		—		—		7	0
St Albans City	2020–21	National League South	10	0	0	0	—		2	0	12	0
St Albans City	2021–22	National League South	1	0	0	0	—		1	0	2	0
St Albans City	Total		18	0	0	0	—		3	0	21	0
Career total			124	5	4	0	0	0	12	0	140	5
