= Mike Clark (conservationist) =

Environmental activist

- Born: Michael S. Clark; September 12, 1945 (age 80); Durham, North Carolina
- Citizenship: United States
- Education: Berea College, B.A. (1967)
- Occupations: Environmental and social activist
- Known for: Executive director of Greater Yellowstone Coalition, president of Friends of the Earth, interim executive director of Greenpeace USA

Mike Clark (born 1945) is a social and environmental activist who worked with several non-governmental organizations, including Greenpeace USA and the Greater Yellowstone Coalition.

== Early life and work ==
Michael S. “Mike” Clark was born on September 12, 1945, in Durham, North Carolina. He earned a degree in English from Berea College in Kentucky in 1967. Following his graduation, he began working as a photojournalist for the Mountain Eagle, a weekly newspaper in Kentucky. During Clark’s work as a photojournalist, he documented the civil rights movement, including Dr. Martin Luther King Jr.’s historic Selma to Montgomery marches.

In 1972, Clark started working as an educator and organizer at the Highlander Research and Education Center, a Tennessee school that trained activists in civil rights, labor, anti-poverty, human rights, and environmental issues. Clark later served as president of the Center.

== Environmental activism ==
In the early 1980s, Clark took a position as the founding executive director of the Northern Lights Institute, a research center in Helena, Montana. A few years later, he moved to Colorado and served as an independent consultant for several grassroots organizations and private foundations. He then moved to Washington, D.C., to serve as the president of the Environmental Policy Institute, the first professional environmental lobbying firm in the United States. He then worked as the president of Friends of the Earth U.S., a global environmental advocacy group also based in Washington, D.C., throughout the late 1980s. Clark also served as executive director of Yellowstone Heritage, an organization working to "preserve wildlife habitat...in the Greater Yellowstone ecosystem."

Clark first served as the director of the Greater Yellowstone Coalition from 1994 to 2001. He served a second term from 2009 to 2013. During his work at the GYC, he was part of a team of activists who prevented gold mining in the New World Mine, which was located at Yellowstone National Park’s northeast entrance. Clark and other environmentalists believed that the mine would cause irreparable damage to Yellowstone’s ecosystem and watersheds, and Clark in particular thought it would destroy Yellowstone's public lands The GYC's activism prompted then-President Bill Clinton to fly out to Yellowstone and “announce that the federal government would buy out the mine” by outbidding the company Crown Butte Mines with the Noranda corporation in 1996. At the GYC, Clark also worked on reintroducing wolves to Yellowstone National Park.

Between 2001 and 2009, Clark led the water management program Western Water Project, which aims to increase streamflows in Western rivers to improve water system health, through Trout Unlimited and served four months as interim executive director of Greenpeace USA before returning to his second term at GYC. In 2014, he served another five months as director for Greenpeace USA. Clark is also a founding board member of Mountain Journal, a non-profit, environmentally-focused publication.

== Personal life ==
In 2018, Clark donated documents, notes, photographs, and other records regarding his career as an activist to the Montana State University, which are now held by Special Collections and Archival Informatics at the Montana State University Library.

== Awards and recognition ==
At the 2019 winter commencement ceremony, Montana State University granted Clark an honorary doctorate in letters for his contributions to civil rights and conservation.

== Publications ==
- Clark, Mike, Jim Branscome, and Bob Snyder. Miseducation in Appalachia. Huntington, W. Va.: Appalachian Press, 1974.

== Later years ==
In 2013, Clark retired from public activism. He became a consultant and pursued several book projects. Clark also focused on preserving public ranch lands from private developers in Montana to protect ecosystems while maintaining “open spaces for both wildlife and people”. He currently lives in Montana and continues private environmental and writing projects.
