= Yvan Erichot =

French professional footballer (born 1990)

Personal information
- Full name: Yvan Yann Erichot
- Date of birth: 25 March 1990 (age 36)
- Place of birth: Chambray-les-Tours, France
- Height: 1.88 m (6 ft 2 in)
- Position: Centre back

Youth career
- 1996–2001: Joué-les-Tours
- 2001–2005: Collège Pierre Corneille
- 2003–2005: IFR Châteauroux
- 2005–2010: Monaco

Senior career*
Years	Team	Apps	(Gls)
2010–2013	Monaco	0	(0)
2010–2011	→ Clermont Foot (loan)	9	(0)
2011–2012	→ União Leiria (loan)	1	(0)
2013–2016	Sint-Truidense	25	(0)
2016–2017	Leyton Orient	19	(0)
2017	Pafos	0	(0)
2018–2019	ÍBV	17	(0)
2020	CSM Reșița	1	(0)

International career^{‡}
2006	France U17	1	(0)
- * Club domestic league appearances and goals as of 22 July 2020 ‡ National team caps and goals as of 27 March 2013

Yvan Yann Erichot (born 25 March 1990) is a French professional footballer. He can play as either a centre back or a right back.

== Career ==
=== Monaco and Clermont Foot loan ===
On 26 June 2010, Erichot signed his first professional contract after agreeing to a three-year deal with Monaco. The following month, he was loaned to Clermont. Erichot made his professional debut with Clermont on 13 August 2010 in a league match against Dijon. He appeared as a half-time substitute in a 2–2 draw.

=== Leyton Orient ===
On 1 July 2016, Erichot signed a two-year contract with English League Two side Leyton Orient, with the option of a further year.

=== ÍBV ===
In December 2017, Erichot signed a one-year deal with Icelandic Úrvalsdeild side and reigning cup winners ÍBV.
