= Paul McCallum (footballer) =

English footballer

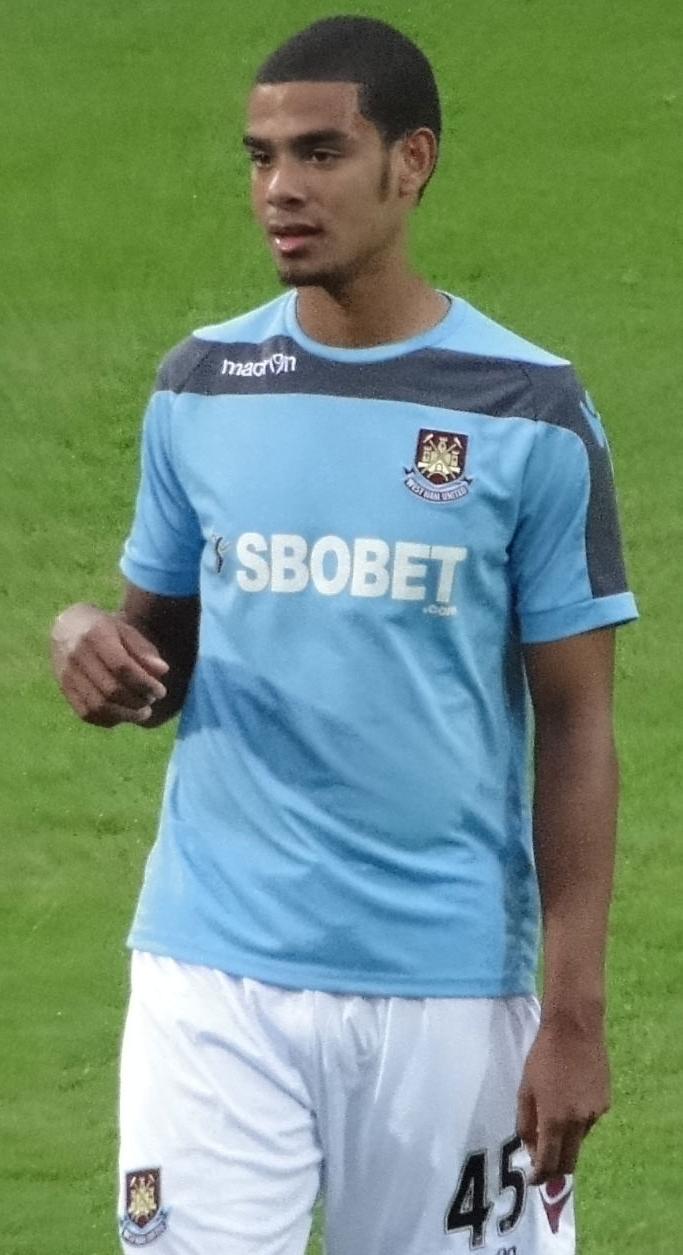
- McCallum warming-up for West Ham United, August 2012

Personal information
- Full name: Paul Leon Miller McCallum
- Date of birth: 28 July 1993 (age 33)
- Place of birth: Streatham, England
- Height: 1.91 m (6 ft 3 in)
- Position: Striker

Team information
- Current team: Eastbourne Borough
- Number: 26

Youth career
- Dulwich Hamlet

Senior career*
Years	Team	Apps	(Gls)
2010–2011	Dulwich Hamlet		
2011–2015	West Ham United	0	(0)
2012	→ Rochdale (loan)	0	(0)
2012–2013	→ AFC Wimbledon (loan)	9	(4)
2013	→ Aldershot Town (loan)	9	(3)
2013	→ Torquay United (loan)	5	(3)
2014	→ Heart of Midlothian (loan)	6	(0)
2015	→ Portsmouth (loan)	7	(0)
2015–2017	Leyton Orient	39	(11)
2017–2019	Eastleigh	67	(35)
2019–2020	Solihull Moors	21	(8)
2020	→ Barnet (loan)	5	(4)
2020–2023	Dagenham & Redbridge	95	(39)
2023	→ Chesterfield (loan)	18	(4)
2023–2026	Eastleigh	89	(41)
2026	→ Dorking Wanderers (loan)	12	(2)
2026	Havant & Waterlooville	9	(3)
2026–	Eastbourne Borough	7	(0)

International career
2024	England C	1	(0)
- * Club domestic league appearances and goals as of 23:35, 21 November 2026 (UTC)

Paul Leon Miller McCallum (born 28 July 1993) is an English professional footballer who plays as a striker for Isthmian League Premier Division club Eastbourne Borough.

He has previously played for clubs including West Ham United, AFC Wimbledon, Leyton Orient, Hearts and Portsmouth.

== Career ==
=== Early years ===
McCallum made his name at Isthmian League Division One club Dulwich Hamlet breaking through from the youth team to the senior team in October 2010. Over the course of the 2010–11 season, the striker scored a total of 15 goals in 7 games in the FA Youth Cup, including a hat-trick to produce a shock 3–2 victory over Football League One side Yeovil Town in the Second Round. The club faced Newcastle United in the Third Round but were ultimately thrashed 6–2. Although McCallum did not score himself, he was able to provide an assist for one of the consolation goals. His prolific goalscoring attracting the interest of 14 clubs, including Premier League giants Arsenal, Chelsea, Manchester United, Liverpool and West Ham United. The striker ultimately chose West Ham United, signing a professional contract with the Hammers on 31 January 2011, citing their reputation for bringing young players through as a key reason for his decision.

=== West Ham ===
McCallum formed part of the Hammers Under-21 development squad during the 2011–12 season. He was loaned out to Rochdale on 31 January 2012. However, the striker returned to his parent club on 9 March 2012 without making a single appearance for the then League One strugglers. McCallum's first involvement with the West Ham United senior squad was on 28 August 2012 as an unused substitute in the Second Round of the Football League Cup, in which the Hammers beat Crewe Alexandra 2–0. On 7 January 2013 McCallum signed a new deal with West Ham United extending his contract with the club for a further two and a half years. He was released by West Ham at the end of the 2014–15 season.

==== AFC Wimbledon (loan) ====
On 22 November 2012, McCallum joined League Two outfit AFC Wimbledon on an initial one-month loan deal. The striker made his debut for the Dons on 24 November 2012, in a 3–1 defeat by Morecambe, but was awarded a red card in the 82nd minute for a foul on Nick Fenton. AFC Wimbledon manager Neal Ardley sought to give the young striker a second chance to prove himself however, by extending his loan spell until 19 January 2013. Having served out his three match suspension, McCallum returned to AFC Wimbledon's starting eleven on 29 December 2012 in a 3–0 defeat by Oxford United. McCallum repaid Ardley's faith in him by scoring his first league goal the following game in a 3–2 away win over Torquay United on 1 January 2013. Having found his form, the striker went on to score his second on 5 January 2013 in a 1–0 away win over Rochdale, which took AFC Wimbledon out of the relegation zone. This was the first time the League Two strugglers had secured back to back wins in the 2012–13 season, with McCallum having been instrumental to the club's success in both games. On 12 January 2013, McCallum added to his tally by scoring a brace in a 2–2 draw with Wycombe Wanderers, totalling four goals in three games. In light of his prolific form, McCallum's loan spell was extended until 23 February 2013. On 11 February 2013, McCallum was named as League Two Player of the Month for January 2013 by Match magazine following his prolific run of four goals in three matches. On 22 February it was announced that McCallum had returned to parent club West Ham United a day earlier than planned after failing to shake off an ankle injury.

==== Aldershot Town (loan) ====
On 8 March 2013, McCallum joined Football League Two side Aldershot Town on a one-month loan deal.

==== Torquay United (loan) ====
McCallum signed a further loan deal in October 2013, joining Torquay United on a one-month loan. On 2 November 2013 in his third game for Torquay, McCallum scored his first two goals for the club, in a 3–1 away win against Bury. He scored his third and final goal in a 2–1 away defeat to Accrington Stanley on 23 November but soon after returned to West Ham prematurely after receiving a back injury. He had played six games in all competitions for Torquay scoring three goals.

==== Heart of Midlothian (loan) ====
On 30 January 2014, McCallum signed for Scottish Premiership side Heart of Midlothian (Hearts), on loan until the end of the season. He made his debut for Hearts on 2 February in a semi-final of the Scottish League Cup against Inverness Caledonian Thistle coming on as a 64th-minute substitute for Dylan McGowan. The game had finished 2–2 and in the penalty shootout required to decide a winner, McCallum missed his penalty as Inverness won 4–2 on penalties. With two games left in Hearts' season McCallum injured his ankle in training and returned to West Ham. He had played six games for Hearts without scoring.

==== Portsmouth (loan) ====
On 15 January 2015, McCallum signed on-loan for the rest of the 2014–15 season for Portsmouth. He made his debut on 17 January in a 1–1 home draw with Burton Albion. In his second game, a 2–1 home defeat to Southend United on 24 January, he was sent-off for fighting. On 28 January 2015 he was charged by the FA with improper conduct arising from the same incident. McCallum was alleged to have made contact with referee, Lee Collins. On 3 February, he was banned for seven games after pleading guilty to the charge.

=== Leyton Orient ===
McCallum joined League Two club Leyton Orient on a two-year contract on 19 June 2015. He made his league debut for Orient against Barnet on 8 August 2015, and scored the second goal in their 2–0 win. McCallum wasn't offered a new contract at the end of the 2016–17 season and left Orient, with a record of 15 goals in 43 appearances, to sign a two-year contract with Eastleigh.

=== Solihull Moors ===
On 28 May 2019, McCallum joined Solihull Moors on a two-year deal following his 27-goal season with Eastleigh.

==== Barnet (loan) ====
On 31 January 2020, McCallum joined Barnet on loan until the end of the season with an option to make the loan permanent. He made his Barnet debut on 1 February 2020 in a 2–1 home win against Hartlepool United. Coming on as a 60th minute substitute he scored after only a minute and assisted Barnet's second goal.

=== Dagenham & Redbridge ===
McCallum signed for Dagenham & Redbridge on 7 August 2020 on a three-year deal.

==== Chesterfield (loan) ====
On 10 February 2023, McCallum signed for Chesterfield on loan until the end of the 2022–23 season, helping the Spireites reach the National League Play-Off Final.

=== Eastleigh ===
On 30 May 2023, McCallum returned to former club Eastleigh, rejoining the club after a four-year absence. His return to Eastleigh begun well with 15 goals in his first 16 league games. In December 2023, he scored both goals as Eastleigh defeated League One club Reading to progress to the third round. Having averaged a goal every eighty-two minutes across the month, he was awarded the National League Player of the Month award for December. After finishing as top scorer of the National League that season with 31 goals, he was named as Eastleigh's Player of the Year.

On 9 January 2026, McCallum joined National League South side, Dorking Wanderers on loan for the remainder of the 2025–26 season.

He was released by Eastleigh upon the expiry of his contract at the end of the 2025–26 season.

=== Havant & Waterlooville ===
On 15 May 2026, McCallum joined Southern League Premier Division South club Havant & Waterlooville.

=== Eastbourne Borough ===
On 9 October 2026, McCallum signed for Isthmian League Premier side Eastbourne Borough.

== International career ==
In March 2024, McCallum was called up to the England C team for their upcoming fixture against Wales C.

== Career statistics ==
As of match played 21 November 2026

Appearances and goals by club, season and competition
Club	Season	League			National Cup (Note: Includes FA Cup)		League Cup (Note: Includes EFL Cup and Scottish League Cup)		Other		Total	
Club	Season	Division	Apps	Goals	Apps	Goals	Apps	Goals	Apps	Goals	Apps	Goals
West Ham United	2011–12	Premier League	0	0	0	0	0	0	—		0	0
West Ham United	2012–13	Premier League	0	0	0	0	0	0	—		0	0
West Ham United	2013–14	Premier League	0	0	0	0	0	0	—		0	0
West Ham United	2014–15	Premier League	0	0	0	0	0	0	—		0	0
West Ham United	Total		0	0	0	0	0	0	0	0	0	0
Rochdale (loan)	2011–12	League One	0	0	—		—		—		0	0
AFC Wimbledon (loan)	2012–13	League Two	9	4	0	0	—		—		9	4
Aldershot Town (loan)	2012–13	League Two	9	3	—		—		—		9	3
Torquay United (loan)	2013–14	League Two	5	3	1	0	—		—		6	3
Heart of Midlothian (loan)	2013–14	Scottish Premiership	6	0	—		1	0	—		7	0
Portsmouth (loan)	2014–15	League Two	7	0	—		—		—		7	0
Leyton Orient	2015–16	League Two	10	3	0	0	0	0	0	0	10	3
Leyton Orient	2016–17	League Two	29	8	1	0	1	2	2 (Note: Appearances in EFL Trophy)	2	33	12
Leyton Orient	Total		39	11	1	0	1	2	2	2	43	15
Eastleigh	2017–18	National League	26	8	1	0	—		1 (Note: Appearances in FA Trophy)	0	28	8
Eastleigh	2018–19	National League	41	27	1	0	—		3 (Note: One appearance in FA Trophy, two appearances and one goal in National League play-offs)	1	45	28
Eastleigh	Total		67	35	2	0	—		4	1	73	36
Solihull Moors	2019–20	National League	21	8	3	1	—		3 (Note: Two appearances in FA Trophy, one appearance in Scottish Challenge Cup)	0	27	9
Barnet (loan)	2019–20	National League	5	4	—		—		2 (Note: Appearances in National League play-offs)	1	7	5
Dagenham & Redbridge	2020–21	National League	36	16	1	1	—		2	1	39	18
Dagenham & Redbridge	2021–22	National League	36	18	1	0	—		2	2	39	20
Dagenham & Redbridge	2022–23	National League	23	5	1	2	—		2	1	26	8
Dagenham & Redbridge	Total		95	39	3	3	—		6	4	104	46
Chesterfield (loan)	2022–23	National League	18	4	—		—		1	0	19	4
Eastleigh	2023–24	National League	38	31	4	3	—		1	1	43	35
Eastleigh	2024–25	National League	35	9	1	2	—		0	0	36	11
Eastleigh	2025–26	National League	16	1	0	0	—		0	0	16	1
Eastleigh	Total		89	41	5	3	—		1	1	95	45
Dorking Wanderers (loan)	2025–26	National League South	12	2	—		—		2 (Note: Appearances in National League South play-offs)	0	14	2
Havant & Waterlooville	2025–26	SL Premier Division South	9	3	2	0	—		0	0	11	3
Eastbourne Borough	2026–27	IL Premier Division	7	0	—		—		1	1	8	1
Career total			384	139	17	9	2	2	22	10	425	170

== Honours ==
Individual

- National League Team of the Year: 2018–19, 2023–24
- National League Player of the Month: December 2023
- Eastleigh Player of the Year: 2023–24
