= Jens Janse =

Dutch footballer (born 1986)

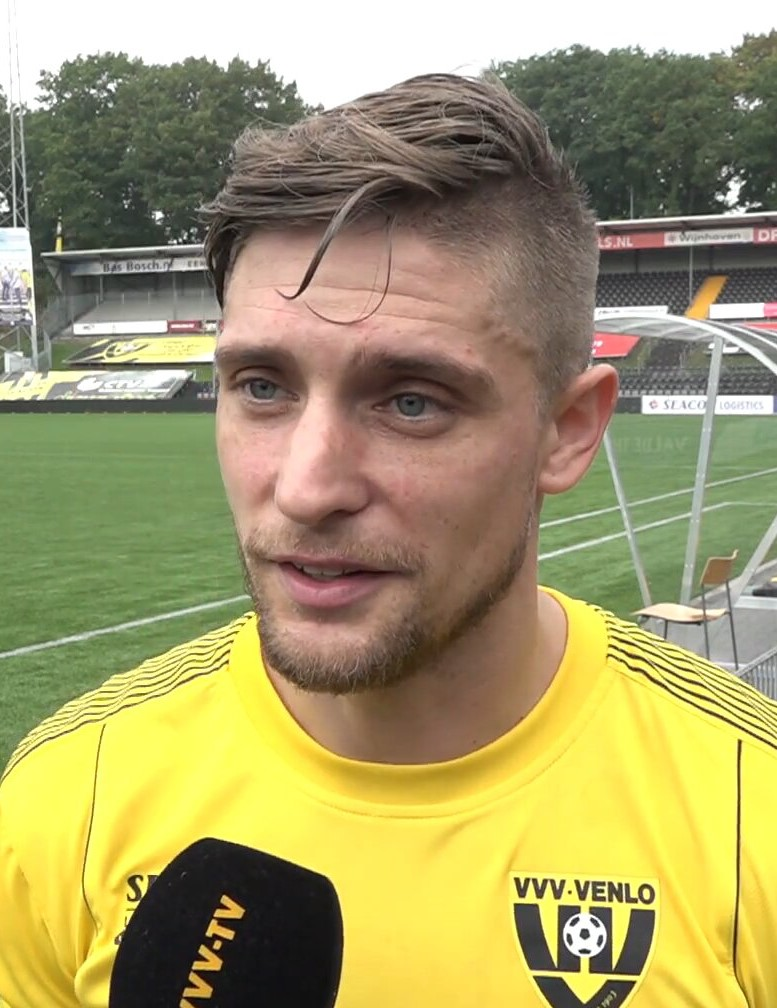
- Janse in 2017

Personal information
- Full name: Jens Christiaan Hubert Peter Willen Janse
- Date of birth: 1 July 1986 (age 40)
- Place of birth: Venlo, Netherlands
- Height: 1.83 m (6 ft 0 in)
- Position: Right back

Team information
- Current team: FC Viterbo

Youth career
- MVC '19
- VVV-Venlo
- 1996–2005: PSV

Senior career*
Years	Team	Apps	(Gls)
2005–2010	Willem II	103	(1)
2010–2013	NAC Breda	58	(0)
2013	Córdoba	11	(0)
2014	Dinamo Tbilisi	3	(0)
2014–2016	Ternana	20	(0)
2016–2017	Leyton Orient	8	(1)
2017–2018	VVV-Venlo	10	(0)
2018	Ellera Calcio		
2018–2019	Messina	10	(0)
2019–2020	Ellera Calcio		
2020–2021	FC Viterbo		
2021–	Terni Est		

International career^{‡}
2004–2005	Netherlands U19	12	(0)
2005–2007	Netherlands U21	21	(0)
- * Club domestic league appearances and goals as of 29 December 2018 ‡ National team caps and goals as of 19:05, 10 October 2009 (UTC)

Jens Christiaan Hubert Peter Willen Janse (born 1 July 1986) is a Dutch footballer who plays as a right-back for Terni Est in the Italian Promozione. He formerly played for Willem II (where he started his professional football career), NAC Breda, Córdoba CF, Dinamo Tbilisi, Ternana and VVV-Venlo.

== Career ==
=== Early career ===
Born in Venlo, Janse began playing football with amateur team MVC '19 from Maasbree, the town where he grew up. When he became older, he began playing for the youth teams of VVV-Venlo. He was soon spotted by PSV Eindhoven. In PSV's youth, he played as a right winger, but after taking the advice of skills- and talent coach Ricardo Moniz, he instead began playing as a right back. PSV wanted to offer him a first-team contract, but because of the presence of Kasper Bøgelund, Michael Lamey, André Ooijer and Michael Reiziger, he was advised to play somewhere else. Willem II showed their interest, and Janse decided to play in Tilburg.

=== Willem II ===
Janse was chosen to play for Willem II's first team at the beginning of the 2005–06 season. On 11 January 2006, Janse made his debut under the leadership of coach Kees Zwamborn in the match against Heracles Almelo. The match ended in a 1–2 defeat for the Tricolores. Janse provided an assist and received a yellow card. In this season, Janse played in 8 more matches.

During the 2006–07 season, Janse played in place of the injured Nuelson Wau. Wau later signed with Roda JC.

On 24 January 2009, Janse made his first goal in the league in the away match against Feyenoord (1–1).

Janse signed with Willem II's rivals, NAC Breda on 8 April 2010 and he will join the side after the 2009-10 season.

=== Córdoba ===
On 7 July 2013, Janse signed with Córdoba, playing in the Spanish Segunda División.

=== Dinamo Tbilisi ===
On 15 February 2014, Janse signed a contract with Dinamo Tbilisi.

=== Ternana ===
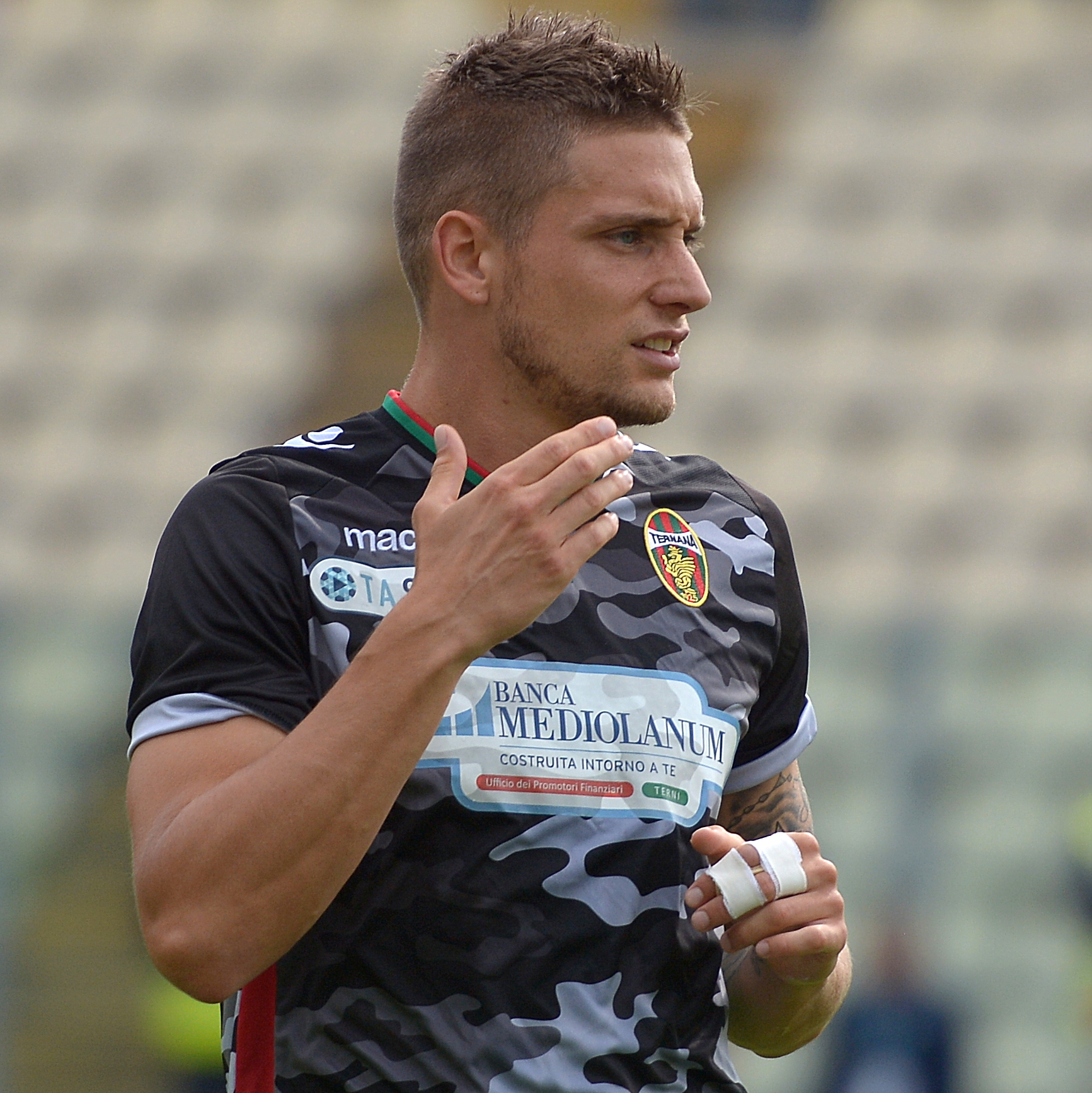
Janse with Ternana in 2015

On 5 September 2014, Janse signed a contract with Ternana Calcio.

=== Leyton Orient ===
On 20 September 2016 it was announced that Janse was joining Leyton Orient till the end of the 2016–17 season. He was sent off 14 minutes into his debut against Plymouth Argyle.

=== Italy ===
After a season at VVV-Venlo, Janse moved to Italy in September 2018 and joined the newly promoted Eccellenza amateur club Ellera Calcio. In December 2018, he then moved to Serie D club A.C.R. Messina.

Janse played 12 games in Messina, before returning to Ellera ahead of the 2019–20 season. On 28 August 2020, Janse joined FC Viterbo in the Italian Promozione.

Janse moved to Terni Est on 22 July 2021.
