= Sammy Moore =

English footballer

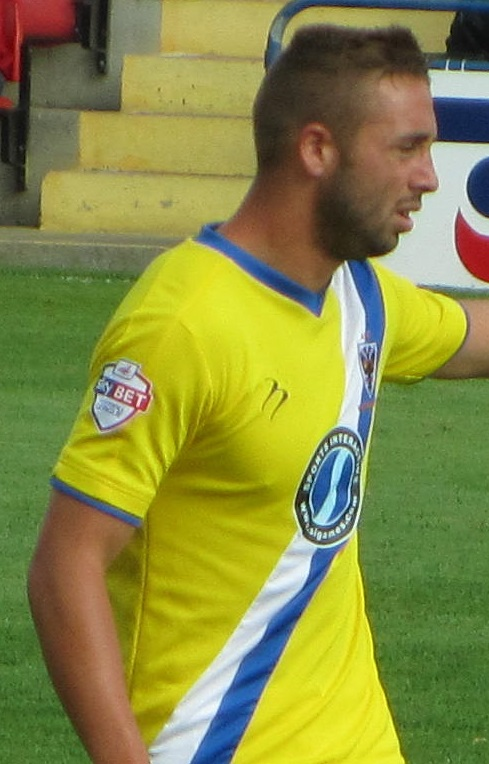
- Moore playing for AFC Wimbledon in 2013

Personal information
- Full name: Samuel Leslie Moore
- Date of birth: 7 September 1987 (age 39)
- Place of birth: Deal, England
- Height: 5 ft 8 in (1.73 m)
- Position: Midfielder

Youth career
- 1995–2002: Charlton Athletic
- 2002–2004: Chelsea
- 2004–2006: Ipswich Town

Senior career*
Years	Team	Apps	(Gls)
2006–2008	Ipswich Town	1	(0)
2007–2008	→ Brentford (loan)	20	(2)
2008	Stevenage Borough	12	(1)
2008–2010	Dover Athletic	68	(13)
2010–2015	AFC Wimbledon	167	(17)
2015–2017	Leyton Orient	34	(2)
2016–2017	→ Dover Athletic (loan)	20	(0)
2017–2018	Leatherhead	26	(1)
2018–2019	Concord Rangers	4	(0)
2020	Folkestone Invicta	4	(0)
Total		356	(36)

Managerial career
- 2017–2018: Leatherhead
- 2018–2019: Concord Rangers
- 2019–2020: Hemel Hempstead Town
- 2022: Potters Bar Town
- 2022–2024: Faversham Town
- 2024: Hythe Town
- 2025–2026: Potters Bar Town
- * Club domestic league appearances and goals

Samuel Leslie Moore (born 7 September 1987) is an English former professional footballer who was most recently the manager of Potters Bar Town.

He made his league debut for Ipswich Town at the age of 19. He went on to play for both Brentford and Stevenage for short spells before signing for non-league side Dover Athletic with whom he remained for two seasons. Dover Athletic proved unable to offer Moore his demands for full-time football however, and he moved to Conference side AFC Wimbledon. At the end of AFC Wimbledon's first season in League Two, Moore was voted Player of the Year 2011–12 by "Dons" fans. His contract was not renewed at the end of the 2014–15 season, and he subsequently signed for League Two side Leyton Orient.

== Playing career ==
=== Early years ===
Moore was born in Deal, Kent and was educated at nearby Dover College. He joined the Charlton Athletic Academy at the age of 8, before being sold to the Chelsea Academy at the age of 14 on 1 July 2002 for a fee of £35,200. He remained with Chelsea for two years before joining the academy of Championship side Ipswich Town on a free transfer on 1 July 2004. The young midfielder quickly integrated himself into the Ipswich Town under–18s squad, and would receive his biggest honour for the club by being a member of the team that won the 2004–05 FA Youth Cup by beating Southampton 3–2 on aggregate on 23 April 2005 in front of a crowd of 14,889 at Portman Road. He signed his first professional contract with Ipswich Town on 1 July 2006, which would keep him at the club for two seasons. The young midfielder made his Football League debut for the club in a 3–1 win over Sunderland on 23 September 2006 as an 89th minute substitute for Matt Richards, in what would prove to be his only senior appearance for "The Blues".

On 25 July 2007, it was announced that Moore would join League Two side Brentford on an initial one-month loan deal. On 11 August 2007, Moore made his debut for Brentford in a 1–1 draw with Mansfield Town. On 15 August 2007, it was announced that Brentford manager Terry Butcher had extended Moore's loan spell with "The Bees" until 7 January 2008. Moore scored his first Football League goal for Brentford on 22 September 2007 in a 2–0 win over Chester City. Moore also scored the winning goal in a 1–0 victory over Lincoln City on 27 October 2007. Moore made his 20th and last appearance for "The Bees" on 5 January 2008 in a 1–0 win over Shrewsbury Town. After returning to Ipswich Town, Moore was released by manager Jim Magilton on 24 January 2008 after being told that he had no future with the club.

=== Stevenage Borough ===
On 28 January 2008, Moore signed for Conference side Stevenage Borough on a non-contractual basis until the end of the 2007–08 season. The 20-year-old midfielder made his debut for "The Boro" on 2 February 2008 in a 4–0 defeat by Exeter City. Moore scored his only goal for Stevenage in a 2–1 defeat by Northwich Victoria on 22 April 2008. Moore made his final appearance for "The Boro" in a 2–1 win over Halifax Town on 26 April 2008. Moore was not offered a new deal with Stevenage and was subsequently released by the club on 20 May 2008.

=== Dover Athletic ===
On 5 June 2008, the 20-year-old midfielder signed a two-year contract with his local club, Dover Athletic, who had just won promotion to the Isthmian League Premier Division. He remained with the club for two years but following his demands for full-time football, which could not be met by Dover, Moore left at the close of the 2009–10 season.

=== AFC Wimbledon ===
On 16 July 2010, Moore signed for Conference side AFC Wimbledon following strong performances as a trialist. On 21 August 2010, Moore opened his scoring account for The Dons with a goal in a 3–0 victory over Tamworth. On 18 November 2010, Moore scored a goal late in injury time against Ebbsfleet United to advance AFC Wimbledon to the second round of the 2010–11 FA Cup. On 5 May 2012, Moore was named AFC Wimbledon Player of the Year for the 2011–12 season. He made his 100th league appearance for the club, with only 5 of them being from the substitutes bench, in a 2–0 win over York City at Bootham Crescent on 7 September 2013.

=== Leyton Orient ===
On 9 June 2015, Moore signed for League Two side Leyton Orient on a two-year contract.

On 17 August 2016, Moore signed for Dover Athletic on a six-month loan until 14 January 2017.

=== Folkestone Invicta ===
On 5 October 2020 Moore, signed for Isthmian League side Folkestone Invicta after he retired from playing for two years.

== Managerial career ==
On 22 May 2017, Moore was announced as first team manager of Isthmian Premier Division club Leatherhead, following the resignation of Jimmy Bullard. Moore also signed for the club as a player.

On 2 May 2018, Moore was appointed as first-team manager of National League South side Concord Rangers on a two-year contract, following an impressive debut season at Leatherhead. Likewise with his spell at Leatherhead, Moore will continue as a player/manager. In his debut season in the National League South, Moore guided Concord to a 6th-place finish, but due to the club failing to meet ground size requirements, they were in turn, barred from the play-offs. Four days later, it was announced that Moore had stepped down from his role due to "ongoing personal problems".

In May 2019, Moore was appointed manager of National League South club Hemel Hempstead Town. On 20 May 2020, Moore and his coaching staff parted company with Hemel Hempstead Town following a year at the club.

On 29 January 2022, he was named as manager of Isthmian League Premier Division side Potters Bar Town, with Moore handed the task of steering the club away from the relegation zone. Moore led the club up the table and on 9 April 2022 signed a contract with the club until 2024. On 29 November 2022, Moore left the club with them sitting top of the league after eighteen matches.

The same day as his departure from Potters Bar Town was announced, Moore was confirmed as the new manager of Faversham Town with his new club sat at the bottom of the Isthmian League South East Division. On 2 January 2024, Moore was sacked by Faversham with the club sat top of the SCEFL Premier Division, winless in three.

On 16 April 2024, Moore was appointed manager of Isthmian South East Division club Hythe Town, taking charge of the club following their match that same evening. On 11 August 2024, Moore resigned from his position as manager after just six matches in charge.

On 4 November 2025, Moore returned as manager to Potters Bar Town. In March 2026, he stood down from his role as manager, feeling that he had taken the club as far as he could.

== Career statistics ==
As of match played 2 April 2018

Appearances and goals by club, season and competition
Club	Season	League			FA Cup		League Cup		Other		Total	
Club	Season	Division	Apps	Goals	Apps	Goals	Apps	Goals	Apps	Goals	Apps	Goals
Ipswich Town	2006–07	Championship	1	0	0	0	0	0	—		1	0
Brentford (loan)	2007–08	League Two	20	2	2	0	1	0	1 (Note: Appearance(s) in Football League Trophy)	0	24	2
Stevenage Borough	2007–08	Conference Premier	12	1	—		—		0	0	12	1
Dover Athletic	2008–09	Isthmian League Premier Division	31	9	4	1	—		2 (Note: Appearance(s) in FA Trophy)	0	37	10
Dover Athletic	2009–10	Conference South	37	4	1	0	—		4 (Note: Three appearances in FA Trophy, one in Conference South play-offs)	0	42	4
Dover Athletic	Total		68	13	5	1	—		6	0	79	14
AFC Wimbledon	2010–11	Conference Premier	28	5	4	2	—		1	0	33	7
AFC Wimbledon	2011–12	League Two	41	6	3	0	1	0	1	0	46	6
AFC Wimbledon	2012–13	League Two	28	2	0	0	1	0	1	0	30	2
AFC Wimbledon	2013–14	League Two	40	4	1	0	1	0	1	0	43	4
AFC Wimbledon	2014–15	League Two	30	0	3	0	1	0	2	0	36	0
AFC Wimbledon	Total		167	17	11	2	4	0	6	0	188	19
Leyton Orient	2015–16	League Two	30	2	0	0	1	0	1	0	32	2
Leyton Orient	2016–17	League Two	4	0	0	0	0	0	0	0	4	0
Leyton Orient	Total		34	2	0	0	1	0	1	0	36	2
Dover Athletic (loan)	2016–17	National League	20	0	0	0	—		0	0	20	0
Leatherhead	2017–18	Isthmian League Premier Division	26	1	6	2	—		1	0	33	3
Concord Rangers	2018–19	National League South	4	0	0	0	—		0	0	4	0
Folkestone Invicta	2020–21	Isthmian League Premier Division	4	0	0	0	—		1	0	5	0
Career total			356	36	24	5	6	0	16	0	402	41

== Managerial statistics ==
As of match played 27 April 2019

Managerial record by team and tenure
Team	From	To	Record					Ref
Team	From	To	P	W	D	L	Win %	Ref
Leatherhead	22 May 2017	2 May 2018	55	30	8	17	54.5	
Concord Rangers	2 May 2018	30 April 2019	46	22	13	11	47.8	
Total			101	52	21	28	51.5	—

== Honours ==
Ipswich Town

- FA Youth Cup: 2004–05

Dover Athletic

- Isthmian League Premier Division: 2008–09

AFC Wimbledon

- Conference National play-offs: 2010–11
