= Michael Stephen Clark =

American newspaper columnist

- Born: 1947 or 1948 (age 76–77)
- Occupation: Newspaper columnist
- Spouse: Karen Clark
- Children: Joe Clark; Harry Clark; Tully Clark

Michael Stephen "Mike" Clark was a popular newspaper columnist in the 1970s and 1980s. Clark wrote for The Commercial Appeal, a Memphis newspaper. He was named Scripps-Howard's Reporter of the Year and nominated for the Pulitzer Prize in 1981 for a series of articles about the intersection of conservative religion and the Republican Party. He left the paper in 1985 to care for his infant daughter, Tully, and, subsequently, his sons, Joe and Harry, while his wife, Karen, worked as a physician.
