= 2026–27 Huddersfield Town A.F.C. season =

118th season in existence of Huddersfield Town AFC

Huddersfield Town
2026–27 season
- Chairman: Kevin M. Nagle
- Head coach: Martin Drury
- Stadium: Kirklees Stadium
Home colours	Away colours	Third colours

The 2026–27 season is the 118th season in the history of Huddersfield Town Association Football Club and their third consecutive season in League One. In addition to the domestic league, the club would also participate in the FA Cup, the EFL Cup, and the EFL Trophy.

== Transfers and contracts ==
=== In ===
Date	Pos.	Player	From	Fee	Ref.
30 June 2026	CM	(England) Ethan Brierley	(England) Brentford	Undisclosed	
1 July 2026 (Note: The transfer was announced on 11 June, and would become official on July 1 once Fletcher's contract at Blackpool expired.)	CF	(England) Ashley Fletcher	(England) Blackpool	Free	
3 July 2026	RB	(Netherlands) Ilias Bronkhorst	(Netherlands) Excelsior	Free	
8 July 2026	LB	(England) Dylan Tawodzera	(England) Sheffield United	Free	
21 July 2026	RW	(Netherlands) Derensili Sanches Fernandes	(Netherlands) Excelsior	Undisclosed	
28 July 2026	CF	(England) Jahkyah Ebanks-Blake	(England) Cambridge United	Free	
5 August 2026	CB	(Scotland) Ibane Bowat	(England) Portsmouth	Undisclosed	
13 August 2026	CDM	(England) Archie Collins	(England) Peterborough United	Free	
3 September 2026	CF	(England) Samson Tovide	(England) Colchester United	Free	

=== Loaned in ===
Date	Pos.	Player	From	Date until	Ref.
29 June 2026	GK	(England) Matty Young	(England) Sunderland	End of Season	
1 September 2026	CM	(England) Cameron Humphreys	(England) Ipswich Town	End of Season	

=== Loaned out ===
Date	Pos.	Player	To	Loaned until	Ref.
19 June 2026	CF	(England) Alfie May	(England) Doncaster Rovers	End of Season	
27 June 2026	CF	(Northern Ireland) Dion Charles	(England) Blackpool	End of Season	
23 July 2026	GK	(England) Hugo Bennett	(England) Golcar United	1 January 2027	
25 August 2026	LW	(England) Sahil Bashir	(Scotland) Greenock Morton	15 January 2027	
1 September 2026	CAM	(England) Antony Evans	(England) Walsall	End of Season	
1 September 2026	CF	(England) George Sebine	(England) Rotherham United	End of Season	
10 October 2026	LB	(England) Louis Poland	(England) Stocksbridge Park Steels	10 November 2026	
2 November 2026	RB	(England) Max Murray	(England) Buxton	27 November 2026	

=== Out ===
Date	Pos.	Player	To	Fee	Ref.
15 June 2026	LB	(Netherlands) Ruben Roosken	(England) Oxford United	Undisclosed	
1 July 2026	GK	(Australia) Jacob Chapman	(Scotland) St Mirren	Undisclosed	
1 July 2026	GK	(England) Lee Nicholls	(England) Preston North End	Undisclosed	
31 August 2026	CM	(England) Tom Iorpenda	(Wales) Swansea City	£750,000 (Note: A potential further £250,000 in performance related add-ons.)	

=== Released / Out of Contract ===
Date	Pos.	Player	Subsequent club	Joined date	Ref.
30 June 2026	LB	(England) Luke Daley	(England) Buxton	1 July 2026	
30 June 2026	CM	(England) Jackson Shorrocks	(England) Clitheroe	22 July 2026	
30 June 2026	RB	(England) Omari Mrisho	(England) Crawley Town	28 July 2026	
30 June 2026	LWB	(England) Mickel Miller	(England) Bromley	28 August 2026	
30 June 2026	CM	(England) Brooklyn Bailey			
30 June 2026	CM	(England) Oliver Calland			
30 June 2026	RB	(England) Neo Eccleston			
30 June 2026	CF	(Sudan) Mohamed Fikri			
30 June 2026	CF	(England) Rhys Healey			
30 June 2026	CAM	(England) Charlie Knowles			
30 June 2026	CM	(England) Milkyas Mebrahtu			
30 June 2026	CB	(Jamaica) Joe Nicholson			
30 June 2026	CB	(Republic of Ireland) Aaron O'Reilly			
30 June 2026	RB	(South Africa) Gabriano Shelton			
30 June 2026	CF	(England) Peter Thomas			
30 June 2026	GK	(England) Alex Walpole			

=== New Contract ===
Date	Pos.	Player	Contract Expiry	Ref.
6 May 2026	CAM	(England) Cameron Ashia	30 June 2027	
6 May 2026	CB	(United States) Ian Togo	30 June 2027	
1 July 2026	GK	(New Zealand) Nik Tzanev	30 June 2027 (Note: Club option for a further year)	
6 July 2026	CB	(England) George Iorpenda	30 June 2029	
6 July 2026	RB	(England) Max Murray	30 June 2029	
6 July 2026	CF	(England) George Sebine	30 June 2029	
6 July 2026	RB	(England) Jay Smith-Sway	30 June 2029	
6 July 2026	CDM	(England) Daniel Vost	30 June 2028	
7 July 2026	GK	(Northern Ireland) Francis Hurl	30 June 2028	
7 July 2026	CM	(Wales) Marlie Neil	30 June 2029	
7 July 2026	CB	(United States) Ian Togo	30 June 2027	
8 July 2026	GK	(England) Hugo Bennett	Undisclosed (Note: First professional contract)	
8 July 2026	CF	(England) Zac Bowker	Undisclosed	
8 July 2026	CB	(England) Nicolas Idemudia	Undisclosed	
8 July 2026	CAM	(Gibraltar) Luke Schofield	Undisclosed	
9 July 2026	LW	(England) Michael Onyeka	30 June 2029	
16 July 2026	CB	(Suriname) Radinio Balker	30 June 2028	
30 September 2026	CF	(England) Fortune Fontoh	Undisclosed	

== Pre-season and friendlies ==
On 19 May, The Terriers announced a pre-season training camp in Alcantarilha, Portugal for six days between 5–11 July, with a friendly against Birmingham City later confirmed. A day later, a home friendly against Blackburn Rovers was confirmed. A Behind closed doors fixture versus Sheffield United was later added. On 5 June, a third friendly fixture was announced against Fleetwood Town. On 2 July, a trip to face AFC Fylde was added to the schedule. On 20 July, two behind-closed-doors friendlies against Oldham Athletic and Middlesbrough were announced.

Win Draw Loss Fixtures

10 July 2026 Friendly	Birmingham City	3–1	Huddersfield Town	Ferreiras, Portugal
11:00 WEST	Gray (penalty missed) 19', 20'; Furuhashi 87', 88'	Report	Sebine 90'	Stadium: Estádio da Nora

18 July 2026 Friendly	AFC Fylde	1–2	Huddersfield Town	Medlar-with-Wesham
15:00 BST	Morris 6'	Report	Low 47'; Ledson 50'	Stadium: Mill Farm Stadium

21 July 2026 Friendly	Sheffield United	3–1	Huddersfield Town	Shirecliffe
12:00 BST	Cannon 60' (pen.); McCallum 67'; Chong 75'	Report	Smith-Sway 3'	Stadium: Randox Health Academy; Attendance: 0 (BCD)

21 July 2026 Friendly	Fleetwood Town	2–1	Huddersfield Town	Fleetwood
19:30 BST	Coughlan 15' (pen.); Bennett 59'	Report	Mumba 28'; Bashir (penalty missed) 79'	Stadium: Highbury Stadium

24 July 2026 Friendly	Huddersfield Town	3–1	Oldham Athletic	Huddersfield
15:00 BST	Iorpenda 52'; Tawodzera 83'; Onyeka 85'	Report	Fondop 74'	Stadium: Canalside; Attendance: 0 (BCD)

25 July 2026 Friendly	Middlessbrough	1–3	Huddersfield Town	Hurworth-on-Tees
13:00 BST	Whittaker	Report	Kasumu 11'; Ebanks-Blake 82'; Spencer 120'	Stadium: Rockliffe Park; Attendance: 0 (BCD)

1 August 2026 Friendly	Huddersfield Town	1–1	Blackburn Rovers	Huddersfield
15:00 BST	Harness 40'	Report	Garrett 73'	Stadium: Accu Stadium; Attendance: 3,167

== Competitions ==
=== League One ===
==== League table ====
Pos	Team	Pld	W	D	L	GF	GA	GD	Pts	Promotion, qualification or relegation
1	Stockport County	16	10	2	4	32	15	+17	32	Promotion to EFL Championship
2	Huddersfield Town	15	8	5	2	28	13	+15	29	Promotion to EFL Championship
3	Oxford United	14	8	5	1	26	14	+12	29	Qualification for League One play-offs
4	Luton Town	15	8	3	4	29	22	+7	27	Qualification for League One play-offs
5	Sheffield Wednesday	15	7	5	3	27	15	+12	26	Qualification for League One play-offs

Updated to match(es) played on 21 November 2026. Source: EFL Official Website
Rules for classification: 1) Points; 2) Goal difference; 3) Number of goals scored; 4) Head-to-head results; 5) Wins; 6) Away goals; 7) Penalty points (sec 9.5); 8) 12-point sending off offences

==== Results summary ====
Overall								Home						Away					
Pld	W	D	L	GF	GA	GD	Pts	W	D	L	GF	GA	GD	W	D	L	GF	GA	GD
15	8	5	2	28	13	+15	29	4	3	1	16	8	+8	4	2	1	12	5	+7

Last updated: 21 November 2026.
Source: Soccerway

==== Results by round ====
Round	1	2	3	4	5	6	7	9	10	11	12	13	14	8^{1}	15	16	17	18	19	20	21	22	23	24	25	26	27	28
Ground	H	A	A	H	H	A	A	A	H	A	H	H	A	H	A	H	A	H	H	A	H	A	A	H	H	A	A	H
Result	W	D	W	W	D	D	L	W	D	W	W	W	W	D	P	L												
Position	1	2	2	1	2	2	4	3	4	3	2	1	1	1	P	2												
Points	3	4	7	10	11	12	12	15	16	19	22	25	28	29	P	29												

Source: EFL
A = Away; H = Home; W = Win; D = Draw; L = Loss; P = Postponed
Notes:
- ^{1} Matchday 8 (vs. Luton Town) was postponed due to international call-ups.
- ^{1} Matchday 15 (vs. Wycombe Wanderers) was postponed due to international call-ups.

==== Matches ====
On 25 June, the League One fixtures were revealed.

Win Draw Loss Fixtures

15 August 2026 1	Huddersfield Town	3–0	AFC Wimbledon	Huddersfield
15:00 BST	Fernandes 4', 15', (yellow card) 49'; Mumba (red card) 29'; Radulović 78'	Report	Hippolyte (yellow card) 15'; Browne (yellow card) 74'	Stadium: Accu Stadium; Attendance: 16,217; Referee: Scott Jackson

22 August 2026 2	Milton Keynes Dons	1–1	Huddersfield Town	Denbigh
15:00 BST	Collins 54', (yellow card) 61'	Report	Taylor 9'; Radulović (yellow card) 80'; Kasumu (yellow card) 82'	Stadium: Stadium MK; Attendance: 9,505; Referee: Abigail Byrne

29 August 2026 3	Cambridge United	1–2	Huddersfield Town	Cambridge
15:00 BST	Bradshaw (yellow card) 54', (goal) 80'; Bennett (yellow card) 89'	Report	Taylor 82', 89' (pen.)	Stadium: Cledara Abbey Stadium; Attendance: 7,031; Referee: Harrison Blair

1 September 2026 4	Huddersfield Town	3–1	Oxford United	Huddersfield
19:45 BST	Wallace (yellow card) 49'; Radulović 56'; Taylor 74', 77'; Ledson (yellow card) 85'	Report	Currie (yellow card) 35'; O'Donkor 70'; Long (yellow card) 83'	Stadium: Accu Stadium; Attendance: 7,031; Referee: Ben Speedie

5 September 2026 5	Huddersfield Town	1–1	Notts County	Huddersfield
15:00 BST	Harness 12'; Balker (yellow card) 40'	Report	Cooper 23'; Lipsiuc (yellow card) 43'; Grant (yellow card) 82'	Stadium: Accu Stadium; Attendance: 18,543; Referee: Ross Martin

12 September 2026 6	Mansfield Town	0–0	Huddersfield Town	Mansfield
15:00 BST	Moriah-Welsh (yellow card) 45+1'; Dodgson (red card) 47'	Report		Stadium: One Call Stadium; Attendance: 8,476; Referee: Martin Coy

19 September 2026 7	Bromley	2–1	Huddersfield Town	Bromley
15:00 BST	McKiernan 9'; Pinnock (yellow card) 44'; Miller (yellow card) 55', (goal) 71'	Report	Fletcher 45+3'; Taylor (yellow card) 66'; Mumba (yellow card) 90+4'	Stadium: Copperjax Community Stadium; Attendance: 5,004; Referee: Carl Brook

3 October 2026 9	Burton Albion	1–3	Huddersfield Town	Burton upon Trent
15:00 BST	Delap 33', (yellow card) 58'	Report	Wallace (yellow card) 6'; Fernandes 22'; Mumba 39'; Fletcher 69'	Stadium: Pirelli Stadium; Attendance: 4,992; Referee: Neil Hair

10 October 2026 10	Huddersfield Town	2–2	Sheffield Wednesday	Huddersfield
15:00 BST	Collins (yellow card) 26'; Taylor 46'; Fernandes 68'; Low (yellow card) 90+12'	Report	Slattery (yellow card) 22'; Lumley (yellow card) 57'; Bowat 88' (o.g.); Lowe 90+8' (pen.); Palmer (yellow card) 90+12'	Stadium: Accu Stadium; Attendance: 19,794; Referee: Edward Duckworth

17 October 2026 11	Plymouth Argyle	0–2	Huddersfield Town	Plymouth
15:00 BST		Report	Fernandes 6'; Radulović 55'	Stadium: Home Park; Attendance: 16,124; Referee: Ollie Yates

20 October 2026 12	Huddersfield Town	4–1	Peterborough United	Huddersfield
19:45 BST	Bronkhorst 3', (yellow card) 6'; Taylor 66', 70', (yellow card) 77'; Mumba 79'	Report	Mendonça (yellow card) 9'; Kelly (yellow card) 47'; Leonard 68'	Stadium: Accu Stadium; Attendance: 14,470; Referee: Simon Mather

24 October 2026 13	Huddersfield Town	2–1	Wigan Athletic	Huddersfield
12:30 BST	Bronkhorst 34'; Fletcher (yellow card) 39'; Bowat (yellow card) 48'; Humphreys (yellow card) 75'; Fernandes 80'; Harness (yellow card) 90+4'	Report	Perkins (yellow card) 6'; Barrett (yellow card) 12'; Mellish (yellow card) 43'; Gray (yellow card) 77'; Saydee 90+2'	Stadium: Accu Stadium; Referee: David Rock
Note: Fixture was initially scheduled for a 15:00 kick-off, but was brought forward for live Sky Sports broadcasting.

31 October 2026 14	Bradford City	0–3	Huddersfield Town	Bradford
12:30 GMT	O'Keeffe (yellow card) 14'; Sarcevic (yellow card) 45+1' (yellow-red card) 69'	Report	Low 4'; Young (yellow card) 8'; Collins (yellow card) 15'; Fernandes 48'; Taylor 51'; Mumba (yellow card) 63'; Humphreys (yellow card) 89'	Stadium: Mbanq Valley Parade; Attendance: 23,776; Referee: Leigh Doughty
Note: Fixture was initially scheduled for a 15:00 kick-off, but was brought forward at the behest of West Yorkshire Police.

3 November 2026 8	Huddersfield Town	1–1	Luton Town	Huddersfield
19:45 GMT	Taylor 49'	Report	Palmer (yellow card) 35'; Clark 30'	Stadium: Accu Stadium; Referee: Matt Donohue
Note: Fixture was initially scheduled for 26 September, but was rearranged due to international call-ups.

14 November 2026 15	Wycombe Wanderers	Postponed	Huddersfield Town	High Wycombe
15:00 GMT				Stadium: Adams Park
Note: Fixture was postponed due to international call-ups.

21 November 2026 16	Huddersfield Town	0–1	Leicester City	Huddersfield
15:00 GMT		Report	Page 52'; Lundstram (yellow card) 69'; Riis (yellow card) 88'; Okoli (yellow card) 90+3'	Stadium: Accu Stadium; Attendance: 18,969; Referee: Scott Oldham

26 November 2026 17	Doncaster Rovers	v	Huddersfield Town	Doncaster
20:00 GMT				Stadium: Club Doncaster Sports Village
Note: Fixture was initially scheduled for 28 November, but was brought forward a couple days for live Sky Sports broadcasting.

1 December 2026 18	Huddersfield Town	v	Stevenage	Huddersfield
19:45 GMT				Stadium: Accu Stadium

12 December 2026 19	Huddersfield Town	v	Leyton Orient	Huddersfield
15:00 GMT				Stadium: Accu Stadium

19 December 2026 20	Barnsley	v	Huddersfield Town	Barnsley
12:30 GMT				Stadium: Oakwell
Note: Fixture was initially scheduled for a 15:00 kick-off, but was brought forward for live Sky Sports broadcasting.

26 December 2026 21	Huddersfield Town	v	Blackpool	Huddersfield
15:00 GMT				Stadium: Accu Stadium

29 December 2026 22	Stockport County	v	Huddersfield Town	Edgeley
19:45 GMT				Stadium: Edgeley Park

1 January 2027 23	Sheffield Wednesday	v	Huddersfield Town	Owlerton
15:00 GMT				Stadium: Hillsborough

9 January 2027 24	Huddersfield Town	v	Barnsley	Huddersfield
15:00 GMT				Stadium: Accu Stadium

16 January 2027 25	Huddersfield Town	v	Plymouth Argyle	Huddersfield
15:00 GMT				Stadium: Accu Stadium

19 January 2027 26	Peterborough United	v	Huddersfield Town	Peterborough
19:45 GMT				Stadium: Weston Homes Stadium

23 January 2027 27	Wigan Athletic	v	Huddersfield Town	Wigan
12:30 GMT				Stadium: The Brick Community Stadium
Note: Fixture was initially scheduled for a 15:00 kick-off, but was brought for live Sky Sports broadcasting.

30 January 2027 28	Huddersfield Town	v	Bradford City	Huddersfield
12:30 GMT				Stadium: Accu Stadium
Note: Fixture was initially scheduled for a 15:00 kick-off, but was brought forward at the behest of West Yorkshire Police.

=== FA Cup ===
Huddersfield were drawn at home to Exeter City in the first round.

Win Draw Loss Fixtures

7 December 2026 First round	Huddersfield Town	1–2	Exeter City	Huddersfield
15:00 GMT	Bowat 54'	Report	Taylor 12'; Cummins 81'	Stadium: Accu Stadium; Attendance: 4,302; Referee: Matthew Russell

=== EFL Cup ===
Huddersfield were drawn away to Preston North End in the first round.

Win Draw Loss Fixtures

8 August 2026 First round	Preston North End	1–1 (4–3 p)	Huddersfield Town	Walton
15:00 BST	Gibson (red card) 21'; Vukčević (yellow card) 37'; McCann (yellow card) 69'; Erabi 90+3'	Report	Gooch (yellow card) 4'; Balker 38'	Stadium: Goodison Park; Attendance: 6,120; Referee: Seb Stockbridge
	Penalties
	Devine (penalty scored); Erabi (penalty scored); McCann (penalty scored); Moran (penalty missed); Burgzorg (penalty scored)		(penalty missed) Ledson; (penalty missed) Harness; (penalty scored) Mumba; (penalty scored) Jay Sway; (penalty scored) Taylor
Note: Match was played at Goodison Park due to ongoing renovations at Preston's home pitch, Deepdale.

=== EFL Trophy ===
==== Group stage ====
Huddersfield were drawn against Doncaster Rovers, Rochdale and Liverpool U21 into Northern Group H.

Pos	Div	Team	Pld	W	PW	PL	L	GF	GA	GD	Pts	Qualification
1	L1	Huddersfield Town	3	3	0	0	0	12	1	+11	9	Advance to Round 2
2	L1	Doncaster Rovers	3	2	0	0	1	6	4	+2	6	Advance to Round 2
3	ACA	Liverpool U21	3	0	1	0	2	3	8	−5	2	
4	L2	Rochdale	3	0	0	1	2	4	12	−8	1	

Source: EFL

Win Draw Loss Fixtures

8 September 2026 Group stage	Doncaster Rovers	1–3	Huddersfield Town	Doncaster
19:00 BST	Broadbent (yellow card) 7'; Ayinde 40'	Report	Mumba (yellow card) 32'; Spencer 67'; Low 74'; Sørensen 77'; Bowat (yellow card) 83'	Stadium: Club Doncaster Sports Village; Referee: Richard Eley

6 October 2026 Group stage	Huddersfield Town	5–0	Rochdale	Huddersfield
19:00 BST	Gooch 13'; Smith-Sway 15'; Ashia 56'; Tovide 79'; Schofield (red card) 88'; Spencer 90+4'	Report	Francis (yellow card) 15'	Stadium: Accu Stadium; Attendance: 1,666; Referee: Paul Marsden

10 November 2026 Group stage	Huddersfield Town	4–0	Liverpool U21	Huddersfield
19:00 GMT	Taylor 1', 31'; Low 40'; Ashia 61'	Report	Bradshaw (yellow card) 42'	Stadium: Accu Stadium; Referee: Dean Watson

== Statistics ==
=== Appearances and goals ===
As of match played 21 November 2026

Players with no appearances are not included on the list; italics indicate loaned in player

No.	Pos	Nat	Player	Total		League One		FA Cup		EFL Cup		EFL Trophy	
No.	Pos	Nat	Player	Apps	Goals	Apps	Goals	Apps	Goals	Apps	Goals	Apps	Goals
1	GK	(England) ENG	Matty Young	17	0	15+0	0	1+0	0	1+0	0	0+0	0
2	DF	(Denmark) DEN	Lasse Sørensen	5	1	0+0	0	0+1	0	1+0	0	3+0	1
3	DF	(Scotland) SCO	Murray Wallace	9	0	8+1	0	0+0	0	0+0	0	0+0	0
4	MF	(England) ENG	Ryan Ledson	10	0	6+1	0	1+0	0	1+0	0	0+1	0
5	DF	(Wales) WAL	Joe Low	11	3	4+3	1	1+0	0	0+0	0	3+0	2
6	DF	(England) ENG	Jack Whatmough	2	0	1+0	0	0+0	0	1+0	0	0+0	0
7	DF	(United States) USA	Lynden Gooch	9	1	0+5	0	1+0	0	1+0	0	2+0	1
8	MF	(England) ENG	Archie Collins	14	0	10+2	0	0+0	0	0+0	0	2+0	0
9	FW	(Wales) WAL	Joe Taylor	18	12	14+0	10	0+1	0	0+1	0	2+0	2
10	MF	(Republic of Ireland) IRL	Marcus Harness	20	1	8+7	1	1+0	0	1+0	0	2+1	0
11	FW	(England) ENG	Ashley Fletcher	19	2	9+6	2	1+0	0	1+0	0	0+2	0
12	DF	(Suriname) SUR	Radinio Balker	14	1	12+0	0	1+0	0	1+0	1	0+0	0
14	MF	(England) ENG	Ethan Brierley	5	0	0+1	0	0+1	0	0+0	0	3+0	0
15	DF	(Scotland) SCO	Ibane Bowat	19	1	14+1	0	1+0	1	0+1	0	1+1	0
18	MF	(Nigeria) NGR	David Kasumu	4	0	0+3	0	0+0	0	1+0	0	0+0	0
19	DF	(England) ENG	Bali Mumba	16	2	10+2	2	0+1	0	0+1	0	2+0	0
20	MF	(England) ENG	Cameron Humphreys	13	0	11+0	0	1+0	0	0+0	0	0+1	0
22	DF	(Netherlands) NED	Ilias Bronkhorst	15	2	15+0	2	0+0	0	0+0	0	0+0	0
23	DF	(Republic of Ireland) IRL	Sean Roughan	11	0	6+2	0	0+0	0	1+0	0	2+0	0
24	MF	(England) ENG	Cameron Ashia	3	2	0+0	0	0+1	0	0+0	0	2+0	2
25	FW	(Serbia) SRB	Bojan Radulović	12	3	6+4	3	0+0	0	0+0	0	2+0	0
26	FW	(England) ENG	George Sebine	2	0	0+2	0	0+0	0	0+0	0	0+0	0
27	DF	(England) ENG	Jay Smith-Sway	12	1	2+5	0	1+0	0	0+1	0	2+1	1
29	DF	(England) ENG	Max Murray	3	0	0+0	0	0+0	0	0+0	0	1+2	0
30	FW	(Netherlands) NED	Derensili Sanches Fernandes	16	7	14+1	7	0+0	0	1+0	0	0+0	0
31	GK	(England) ENG	Jak Alnwick	3	0	0+0	0	0+0	0	0+0	0	3+0	0
34	FW	(England) ENG	Samson Tovide	7	1	0+5	0	1+0	0	0+0	0	0+1	1
36	DF	(United States) USA	Ian Togo	2	0	0+0	0	0+0	0	0+0	0	0+2	0
37	DF	(Wales) WAL	Marlie Neil	1	0	0+0	0	0+0	0	0+0	0	1+0	0
38	FW	(England) ENG	Jamie Spencer	2	2	0+0	0	0+0	0	0+0	0	0+2	2
41	MF	(Gibraltar) GIB	Luke Schofield	1	0	0+0	0	0+0	0	0+0	0	0+1	0

== Awards ==
=== Player awards ===
==== EFL League One Player of the Month ====
Month	Player	Result	Ref.
August	(Wales) Joe Taylor	Nominated	
October	(Cape Verde) Derensili Sanches Fernandes	Nominated	

==== EFL League One Goal of the Month ====
Month	Player	Opposition	Result	Ref.
October	(Wales) Joe Low	v. Bradford City	Won	

==== PFA League One Fans' Player of the Month ====
Month	Player	Result	Ref.
October	(Cape Verde) Derensili Sanches Fernandes	Nominated	
October	(Wales) Joe Taylor	Nominated	

=== Manager awards ===
==== EFL League One Manager of the Month ====
Month	Manager	Result	Ref.
August	(England) Martin Drury	Won	
October	(England) Martin Drury	Won	
