= 2025–26 Huddersfield Town A.F.C. season =

117th season in existence of Huddersfield Town AFC

Huddersfield Town
2025–26 season
- Chairman: Kevin M. Nagle
- Manager: Lee Grant (until 17 January); Liam Manning (from 20 January)
- Stadium: Kirklees Stadium
- League One: 9th
- FA Cup: First round
- EFL Cup: Third round
- EFL Trophy: Quarter-finals
- Top goalscorer: League: Leo Castledine (10); All: Leo Castledine (12)
- Highest home attendance: 22,052 v Manchester City (24 Sept 2025, EFL Cup)
- Lowest home attendance: 973 v Mansfield Town (4 Nov 2025, EFL Trophy)
- Average home league attendance: 17,087
- Biggest win: 5–0 v Port Vale (Home, 26 Dec 2025, League One)
- Biggest defeat: 3–0 v Wycombe Wanderers (Away, 25 Oct 2025, League One); 1–4 v Mansfield Town (Home, 25 Apr 2026, League One)
Home colours	Away colours	Third colours

The 2025–26 season was the 117th season in the history of Huddersfield Town Association Football Club and their second consecutive season in League One. In addition to the domestic league, the club also participated in the FA Cup, the EFL Cup, and the EFL Trophy.

== Managerial changes ==
Prior to the season starting, Lee Grant was appointed as manager on a three-year contract, But on 17 January, he was sacked after thirty six games in charge and a win rate of 41.67% Three days later, Liam Manning was appointed as the new head coach.

== Transfers and contracts ==
=== In ===
Date	Pos.	Player	From	Fee	Ref.
1 July 2025 (Note: The transfer was announced on 2 June, and would become official on July 1 once his contract at Ipswich had come to an end)	CAM	(Republic of Ireland) Marcus Harness	(England) Ipswich Town	Free	
1 July 2025 (Note: The transfer was announced on 30 May, and would become official on July 1 once his contract at Preston had come to an end)	CM	(England) Ryan Ledson	(England) Preston North End	Free	
1 July 2025 (Note: The transfer was announced on 10 June, and would become official on July 1 once his contract at Wycombe had come to an end)	CB	(Wales) Joe Low	(England) Wycombe Wanderers	Compensation	
1 July 2025 (Note: The transfer was announced on 10 June, and would become official on July 1 once his contract at Lincoln had come to an end)	CB	(Republic of Ireland) Sean Roughan	(England) Lincoln City	Compensation	
1 July 2025 (Note: The transfer was announced on 18 June, and would become official on July 1 once his contract at Millwall had come to an end)	LB	(Scotland) Murray Wallace	(England) Millwall	Free	
9 July 2025	CB	(England) Jack Whatmough	(England) Preston North End	Undisclosed	
15 July 2025	RWB	(United States) Lynden Gooch	(England) Stoke City	Free	
22 July 2025	CF	(England) Alfie May	(England) Birmingham City	£1,200,000	
23 July 2025	DM	(England) Marcus McGuane	(England) Bristol City	Undisclosed	
20 August 2025	LW	(England) Sahil Bashir	(England) Brighton & Hove Albion	Free	
8 January 2026	GK	(England) Jak Alnwick	(Wales) Cardiff City	Undisclosed	
15 January 2026	RB	(England) Bali Mumba	(England) Plymouth Argyle	Undisclosed	
2 February 2026	GK	(New Zealand) Nik Tzanev	(Wales) Newport County	Free Transfer	

=== Out ===
Date	Pos.	Player	To	Fee	Ref.
7 June 2025	RW	(Wales) Sorba Thomas	(England) Stoke City	Undisclosed	
10 July 2025	RB	(Northern Ireland) Brodie Spencer	(England) Oxford United	Undisclosed	
8 January 2026	CM	(England) Ben Wiles	(England) Milton Keynes Dons	Undisclosed	

=== Loaned in ===
Date	Pos.	Player	From	Date until	Ref.
16 June 2025	CB	(England) Josh Feeney	(England) Aston Villa	31 May 2026	
2 July 2025	GK	(England) Owen Goodman	(England) Crystal Palace	8 January 2026 (Note: On 8 January, Goodman's initial season-long loan from Crystal Palace was terminated)	
1 August 2025	CAM	(England) Leo Castledine	(England) Chelsea	9 January 2026 (Note: On 9 January, Castledine's initial season-long loan from Chelsea was terminated)	
1 September 2025	CAM	(England) Will Alves	(England) Leicester City	31 May 2026	
1 September 2025	CF	(Netherlands) Zépiqueno Redmond	(England) Aston Villa	14 January 2026 (Note: On 14 January, Redmond's initial season-long loan from Aston Villa was terminated)	
8 January 2026	CM	(England) Cameron Humphreys	(England) Ipswich Town	31 May 2026	
2 February 2026	CF	(Scotland) Ryan Hardie	(Wales) Wrexham	31 May 2026	
2 February 2026	CF	(Scotland) Bobby Wales	(Wales) Swansea City	31 May 2026	

=== Loaned out ===
Date	Pos.	Player	To	Date until	Ref.
10 June 2025	CM	(England) Tom Iorpenda	(England) Notts County	31 May 2026	
15 August 2025	CF	(England) Rhys Healey	(England) Barrow	1 January 2026	
1 September 2025	RB	(England) Neo Eccleston	(England) Grimsby Town	7 January 2026 (Note: On 7 January, Eccleston's season-long loan at Grimsby was terminated)	
9 October 2025	GK	(Northern Ireland) Francis Hurl	(England) Whitehawk	31 May 2026	
20 December 2025	RB	(England) Omari Mrisho	(England) Sutton United	13 January 2026	
20 December 2025	CM	(England) Max Murray	(England) Curzon Ashton	13 January 2026	
20 December 2025	CF	(England) George Sebine	(England) Curzon Ashton	13 January 2026	
20 December 2025	CB	(United States) Ian Togo	(England) Trafford	13 January 2026	
20 December 2025	GK	(England) Alex Walpole	(England) Scarborough Athletic	15 January 2026	
15 January 2026	CF	(Wales) Joe Taylor	(England) Wigan Athletic	31 May 2026	
23 January 2026	GK	(Australia) Jacob Chapman	(England) Crawley Town	31 May 2026	
2 February 2026	CM	(England) Herbie Kane	(England) Plymouth Aryle	31 May 2026	
2 February 2026	LB	(Netherlands) Ruben Roosken	(England) Oxford United	31 May 2026 (Note: Includes obligation to purchase)	
3 February 2026	LW	(England) Sahil Bashir	(Qatar) Al-Markhiya	30 April 2026	
14 February 2026	CF	(England) Peter Thomas	(England) Scarborough Athletic		
6 March 2026	GK	(England) Hugo Bennett	(England) Golcar United	31 May 2026	
6 March 2026	LM	(Gibraltar) Luke Schofield	(England) Golcar United	31 May 2026	
6 March 2026	GK	(England) Alex Walpole	(England) Emley	2 May 2026	
9 March 2026	CB	(England) Nicolas Idemudia	(England) Golcar United	31 May 2026	
26 March 2026	CM	(England) Jay Smith-Sway	(England) Hartlepool United	31 May 2026	

=== Released / Out of Contract ===
Date	Pos.	Player	Subsequent club	Join date	Ref.
23 June 2025	CF	(England) Kyle Hudlin	(Vietnam) Nam Dinh	18 July 2025	
30 June 2025	CF	(Poland) Zak Abbott	(Poland) Cartusia Kartuzy	1 July 2025	
30 June 2025	CM	(Scotland) Scott High	(England) Barnet	1 July 2025	
30 June 2025	CB	(England) Matty Pearson	(England) Doncaster Rovers	1 July 2025	
30 June 2025	CB	(Republic of the Congo) Loick Ayina	(England) Salford City	1 July 2025	
30 June 2025	RW	(Northern Ireland) Conor Falls	(Northern Ireland) Cliftonville	1 July 2025	
30 June 2025	LW	(Sierra Leone) Josh Koroma	(England) Leyton Orient	16 July 2025	
30 June 2025	CM	(England) Mikey Stone	(Scotland) Hamilton Academical	2 August 2025	
30 June 2025	RB	(England) Ollie Turton	(England) Salford City	8 August 2025	
30 June 2025	CB	(England) Tom Lees	(England) Peterborough United	16 August 2025	
30 June 2025	GK	(England) Oliver Riva	(England) Eccleshill United	18 September 2025	
30 June 2025	LB	(England) Josh Ruffels	(England) Shrewsbury Town	17 October 2025	
30 June 2025	CM	(England) Cian Philpott	(England) Guiseley	13 December 2025	
30 June 2025	CF	(England) Fope Deru			
30 June 2025	CM	(England) Donnell Garrick			
30 June 2025	CB	(England) Anthony Gregory			
30 June 2025	DM	(England) Jonathan Hogg			
30 June 2025	CF	(England) Danny Isaac			
30 June 2025	CF	(England) Danny Ward			
11 September 2025	CF	(England) Freddie Ladapo	(England) Chesterfield	1 January 2026	

=== New Contract ===
Date	Pos.	Player	Contract Expiry	Ref.
3 July 2025	RB	(England) Neo Eccleston	30 June 2026	
4 August 2025	LB	(Netherlands) Ruben Roosken	30 June 2028	
6 August 2025	CM	(England) Oliver Calland	30 June 2026 (Note: First professional contract)	
6 August 2025	RB	(England) Jay Smith-Sway	30 June 2026	
6 August 2025	GK	(England) Alex Walpole	30 June 2026	
11 September 2025	GK	(England) Lee Nicholls	30 June 2028	
7 January 2026	CF	(England) Jamie Spencer	Undisclosed	

== Pre-season and friendlies ==
On 29 May, it was confirmed that a trip to face Emley would kick-off Huddersfield Town's pre-season preparations. Five days later, the club announced a training camp in Kössen. A home fixture versus Premier League side Burnley was next to be added. On 30 June, three more pre-season matches were confirmed, against Barrow, Young Boys and Greuther Fürth.

Win Draw Loss Fixtures

28 June 2025 Friendly	Emley	3–1	Huddersfield Town	Emley
15:00 BST	Clegg 70', 74'; Nzondo 85'	Report	Feeney 28'	Stadium: Welfare Ground

8 July 2025 Friendly	Huddersfield Town	1–0	Barrow	Huddersfield
13:00 BST	Ladapo 53'	Report		Stadium: Canalside Training Centre; Attendance: 0 (behind-closed-doors)

12 July 2025 Friendly	Lincoln City	3–5	Huddersfield Town	Scampton
15:00 BST	Collins 29'; Draper 70'; Hackett-Fairchild 72'	Report	Hamer 11' (o.g.); Wiles 77', 87'; Miller 79'; Taylor 92'	Stadium: Lincoln City FC Training Ground; Attendance: 0 (behind-closed-doors)

16 July 2025 Friendly	Young Boys	1–1	Huddersfield Town	Schwaz, Austria
15:00 CEST	Raveloson 43'	Report	Taylor 46'	Stadium: Silberstadt Arena

19 July 2025 Friendly	Greuther Fürth	0–1	Huddersfield Town	Kössen, Austria
17:00 CEST		Report	Radulović 76'	Stadium: Kaiserwinkl Arena

26 July 2025 Friendly	Huddersfield Town	0–2	Burnley	Huddersfield
15:00 BST		Report	McDermott 63'; Westley 85'	Stadium: Kirklees Stadium

== Competitions ==
=== League One ===
==== League table ====
Pos	Team	Pld	W	D	L	GF	GA	GD	Pts
7	Luton Town	46	21	11	14	68	56	+12	74
8	Plymouth Argyle	46	22	7	17	75	63	+12	73
9	Huddersfield Town	46	18	13	15	74	64	+10	67
10	Mansfield Town	46	16	17	13	62	50	+12	65
11	Wycombe Wanderers	46	17	12	17	69	58	+11	63

Source: EFL Official Website
Rules for classification: 1) Points; 2) Goal difference; 3) Number of goals scored; 4) Head-to-head results; 5) Wins; 6) Away goals; 7) Penalty points (sec 9.5); 8) 12-point sending off offences

==== Results summary ====
Overall								Home						Away					
Pld	W	D	L	GF	GA	GD	Pts	W	D	L	GF	GA	GD	W	D	L	GF	GA	GD
46	18	13	15	74	64	+10	67	11	9	3	42	27	+15	7	4	12	32	37	−5

Source: Soccerway

==== Results by round ====
Round	1	2	3	4	5	6	7	8	9	10	11	13	14	15	17	12^{1}	18	16^{2}	19	20	21	22	23	24	25	26	27	28	29	30	31	32	33	34	35	36	37	38	39	41	42	43	40^{3}	44	45	46
Ground	H	A	A	H	H	A	H	A	H	A	H	H	A	H	A	A	H	A	A	H	A	H	H	A	H	A	A	H	H	A	H	A	A	H	A	H	A	H	A	H	A	H	H	A	H	A
Result	W	W	L	W	W	L	W	L	D	W	L	L	L	W	W	L	D	L	D	D	W	W	W	D	D	L	L	W	W	W	D	L	L	W	L	W	D	D	L	D	W	D	D	D	L	W
Position	1	1	7	5	2	6	3	6	5	5	6	8	9	10	7	8	8	8	8	9	7	7	5	5	4	5	6	6	6	6	6	6	6	6	6	6	6	7	9	10	9	8	8	9	9	9
Points	3	6	6	9	12	12	15	15	16	19	19	19	19	22	25	25	26	26	27	28	31	34	37	38	39	39	39	42	45	48	49	49	49	52	52	55	56	57	57	58	61	62	63	64	64	67

Source: EFL
A = Away; H = Home; W = Win; D = Draw; L = Loss; P = Postponed
Notes:
- ^{1} Matchday 12 (vs Luton Town) was postponed due to the international call-ups.
- ^{2} Matchday 16 (vs Cardiff City) was postponed due to the international call-ups.
- ^{3} Matchday 40 (vs Cardiff City) was postponed due to the international call-ups.

==== Matches ====
On 26 June, the League One fixtures were announced, with Huddersfield hosting Leyton Orient on the opening weekend.

Win Draw Loss Fixtures

2 August 2025 1	Huddersfield Town	3–0	Leyton Orient	Huddersfield
15:00 BST	Low 7'; Gooch (yellow card) 9'; Whatmough (yellow card) 42'; Harness (yellow card) 45+5'; May 55' (pen.); Roosken 90+5'	Report		Stadium: Kirklees Stadium; Attendance: 17,062; Referee: Simon Mather

9 August 2025 2	Reading	0–2	Huddersfield Town	Reading
12:30 BST	Savage (yellow card) 29'; Jacob (yellow card) 52'; Kyerewaa (yellow card) 53'; Kelvin Ehibhatiomhan (yellow card) 64'	Report	Ledson (yellow card) 53'; Whatmough 74'; May (yellow card) 85'; Ashia 90+3'	Stadium: Madejski Stadium; Attendance: 12,538; Referee: Matthew Corlett
Note: Fixture was originally scheduled for a 15:00 kick-off, but was moved for live Sky Sports broadcasting.

16 August 2025 3	Blackpool	3–2	Huddersfield Town	Blackpool
15:00 BST	Ennis 13', 26', (red card) 36'; Evans 18'	Report	Wiles 4'; Low (yellow card) 24'; Gooch 31'; Harness (yellow card) 90+6'	Stadium: Bloomfield Road; Attendance: 10,922; Referee: Elliot Bell

19 August 2025 4	Huddersfield Town	2–0	Doncaster Rovers	Huddersfield
19:45 BST	Wallace (yellow card) 27'; Ledson (yellow card) 45+1'; Wiles 78'; Taylor 84' (pen.); Sørensen (yellow card) 90'	Report	Broadbent (yellow card) 50'; Sharp (yellow card) 60'; O'Riordan (yellow card) 83'	Stadium: Kirklees Stadium; Attendance: 18,529; Referee: Leigh Doughty

23 August 2025 5	Huddersfield Town	1–0	Stevenage	Huddersfield
15:00 BST	May 66'; Kane (yellow card) 74'; Ashia (yellow card) 77'	Report	Phillips (yellow card) 90+3'	Stadium: Kirklees Stadium; Attendance: 16,489; Referee: Darren Drysdale

30 August 2025 6	Barnsley	3–1	Huddersfield Town	Barnsley
15:00 BST	Keillor-Dunn 9', 85'; Connell 44'	Report	Harness (yellow card) 15'; Goodman (red card) 36'; Taylor (yellow card) 68', (goal) 87'	Stadium: Oakwell; Attendance: 15,783; Referee: Edward Duckworth

6 September 2025 7	Huddersfield Town	3–2	Peterborough United	Huddersfield
15:00 BST	Kane (yellow card) 46', (goal) 67'; Alves 60'; Taylor 90+1'	Report	Morgan 47'; Lisbie (yellow card) 90+4'; Hayes 90+8'	Stadium: Kirklees Stadium; Attendance: 16,383; Referee: Martin Coy

13 September 2025 8	Bradford City	3–1	Huddersfield Town	Bradford
12:30 BST	Pointon 18', 45+4'; Neufville 45+6'; Power (yellow card) 65'	Report	Roosken (yellow card) 13'; Wallace (yellow card) 37'; Castledine (yellow card) 53'; Ledson (yellow card) 58'; Kane (yellow card) 61'; Redmond 80'	Stadium: Valley Parade; Attendance: 24,075; Referee: Scott Oldham
Note: Fixture was originally scheduled for a 15:00 kick-off, but was moved for live Sky Sports broadcasting.

20 September 2025 9	Huddersfield Town	0–0	Burton Albion	Huddersfield
15:00 BST		Report	Evans (yellow card) 26'	Stadium: Kirklees Stadium; Attendance: 15,654; Referee: Andrew Humphries

27 September 2025 10	Exeter City	0–1	Huddersfield Town	Exeter
15:00 BST	Cole (yellow card) 16'; Niskanen (yellow card) 39'; Fitzwater (yellow card) 72'	Report	Castledine 28'; Harness (yellow card) 53'	Stadium: St James Park; Attendance: 6,477; Referee: David Rock

4 October 2025 11	Huddersfield Town	1–2	Stockport County	Huddersfield
15:00 BST	Castledine (yellow card) 18'; Roosken (yellow card) 82'; Radulović 90+2'	Report	Norwood 45+4' (pen.); Onyango (yellow card) 48' (yellow-red card) 53'; Hills (yellow card) 64'; Bailey 78'	Stadium: Kirklees Stadium; Attendance: 18,707; Referee: Ben Toner

16 October 2025 13	Huddersfield Town	1–2	Bolton Wanderers	Huddersfield
20:00 BST	Castledine 7'; Taylor (yellow card) 36'	Report	Sheehan (yellow card) 27'; Cozier-Duberry (yellow card) 29', (goal) 90+5'; Taylor (yellow card) 85'; Dalby 90+3'; Burstow (yellow card) 90+6'	Stadium: Kirklees Stadium; Attendance: 17,201; Referee: Ollie Yates
Note: Fixture was originally scheduled for 18 October, but was rescheduled for live Sky Sports broadcasting.

25 October 2025 14	Wycombe Wanderers	3–0	Huddersfield Town	High Wycombe
15:00 BST	Lowry (yellow card) 20'; Woodrow 38'; Onyedinma 75'; Vost 80' (o.g.)	Report	May (red card) 25'	Stadium: Adams Park; Attendance: 5,738; Referee: Lee Swabey

8 November 2025 15	Huddersfield Town	3–1	Plymouth Argyle	Huddersfield
15:00 GMT	Feeney (yellow card) 17'; Radulović 45'; Charles 70'; Ashia 85'; Gooch (yellow card) 89'	Report	Dale (yellow card) 6'; Boateng (yellow card) 13'; Szűcs (yellow card) 36'; Ibrahim (yellow card) 54'; Ross (yellow card) 58'; Tolaj 88', (yellow card) 89'	Stadium: Kirklees Stadium; Attendance: 16,235; Referee: Seb Stockbridge

22 November 2025 17	Mansfield Town	1–3	Huddersfield Town	Mansfield
15:00 GMT	Lewis (yellow card) 20'; Evans 64'	Report	Radulović 5'; Charles 12'; Sørensen 16'; Feeney (yellow card) 19'	Stadium: Field Mill; Attendance: 8,590; Referee: Craig Hicks

25 November 2025 12	Luton Town	2–1	Huddersfield Town	Luton
19:45 GMT	Richards 33'; Yates 71'	Report	Harness (yellow card) 54'; Castledine 64'	Stadium: Kenilworth Road; Attendance: 9,971; Referee: Andrew Humphries
Note: Fixture was originally scheduled for 11 October, but was postponed due to international call-ups.

29 November 2025 18	Huddersfield Town	3–3	AFC Wimbledon	Huddersfield
15:00 GMT	Castledine 46'; Wiles 63'; Ashia (yellow card) 81'; May 86'; Radulović (yellow card) 89'	Report	Browne 32'; Orsi 48'; Hippolyte (yellow card) 57'; Johnson 71', (yellow card) 73'	Stadium: Kirklees Stadium; Attendance: 16,355; Referee: Scott Oldham

6 December 2025 16	Cardiff City	3–2	Huddersfield Town	Cardiff
12:30 GMT	Salech 6', 62'; Bagan (yellow card) 45+2'; Davies 86'; Robertson (yellow card) 90+6'	Report	Castledine 51'; Ledson (yellow card) 73'; Taylor 89'	Stadium: Cardiff City Stadium; Attendance: 16,048; Referee: Elliot Bell
Note: Fixture was originally scheduled for 15 November, but was postponed due to international call-ups.

9 December 2025 19	Northampton Town	1–1	Huddersfield Town	Northampton
19:45 GMT	Guinness-Walker 9'	Report	Castledine 36'	Stadium: Sixfields Stadium; Attendance: 5,584; Referee: James Durkin

13 December 2025 20	Huddersfield Town	1–1	Wigan Athletic	Huddersfield
12:30 GMT	Wallace (yellow card) 1' (goal) 33'; Gooch (yellow card) 46'	Report	Robinson (yellow card) 5'; Saydee (yellow card) 40'; Rodrigues 52'	Stadium: Kirklees Stadium; Attendance: 16,442; Referee: Darren Drysdale
Note: Fixture was originally scheduled for a 15:00 kick-off, but was rescheduled for live Sky Sports broadcasting.

20 December 2025 21	Rotherham United	1–3	Huddersfield Town	Rotherham
15:00 GMT	Gore (yellow card) 4'; Dawson (yellow card) 90+4'; Nombe 90+5'	Report	Gooch 26', (yellow card) 70'; Radulović 30'; Castledine 44'	Stadium: New York Stadium; Attendance: 9,514; Referee: Matthew Russell

26 December 2025 22	Huddersfield Town	5–0	Port Vale	Huddersfield
15:00 GMT	Castledine 8', 58'; Ledson 15'; Radulović 32'; May 50'; Roosken (yellow card) 73'; Ashia (yellow card) 88'	Report	Byers (yellow card) 14'; Heneghan (yellow card) 90+2'	Stadium: Kirklees Stadium; Attendance: 18,626; Referee: Martin Woods

29 December 2025 23	Huddersfield Town	2–0	Northampton Town	Huddersfield
19:45 GMT	Low 45+5'; Radulović 83'	Report	Fitzsimons (yellow card) 40'; Campbell (yellow card) 45+8'; Taylor (yellow card) 62'	Stadium: Kirklees Stadium; Attendance: 16,639; Referee: Will Finnie

1 January 2026 24	Lincoln City	1–1	Huddersfield Town	Lincoln
15:00 GMT	McGrandles (yellow card) 62'; Reach 69', (yellow card) 86'; Draper (yellow card) 90'	Report	Castledine 61'; Sørensen (yellow card) 81'; May (yellow card) 90+4'	Stadium: Sincil Bank; Attendance: 10,110; Referee: Jamie O'Connor

4 January 2026 25	Huddersfield Town	2–2	Exeter City	Huddersfield
15:00 GMT	Harness 18'; Radulović 43'; May (yellow card) 85'	Report	Cole 20'; Wareham 89', (yellow card) 90+3'	Stadium: Kirklees Stadium; Attendance: 16,071; Referee: Abigail Byrne

10 January 2026 26	Stockport County	1–0	Huddersfield Town	Edgeley
12:30 GMT	Bailey (yellow card) 45+2'; Pye (yellow card) 58'; Norwood (yellow card) 90+2'; Andrésson 90+6'	Report	Gooch (yellow card) 90+5'	Stadium: Edgeley Park; Attendance: 9,486; Referee: David Rock
Note: Fixture was originally scheduled for a 15:00 kick-off, but was rescheduled for live Sky Sports broadcasting.

17 January 2026 27	Burton Albion	3–1	Huddersfield Town	Burton upon Trent
15:00 GMT	Vancooten 4', (yellow card) 42'; Beesley 57'; McKiernan 78'	Report	May 28'; Gooch (yellow card) 44'; Humphreys (yellow card) 59'; Balker (yellow card) 84'; Wallace (yellow card) 90'	Stadium: Pirelli Stadium; Attendance: 4,318; Referee: Simon Mather

24 January 2026 28	Huddersfield Town	1–0	Bradford City	Huddersfield
12:30 GMT	McGuane (yellow card) 9' (yellow-red card) 62'; Harness 23'; Nicholls (yellow card) 78'; Mumba (yellow card) 81'	Report	Neufville (yellow card) 41'	Stadium: Kirklees Stadium; Attendance: 21,422; Referee: Edward Duckworth
Note: Fixture was initially scheduled for a 15:00 kick-off, but was rescheduled following a request from the West Yorkshire Police.

27 January 2026 29	Huddersfield Town	1–0	Luton Town	Huddersfield
19:45 GMT	May (red card) 29'; Ledson 48'; Low (yellow card) 86'	Report	Walsh (yellow card) 4'; Andersen (yellow card) 44'	Stadium: Kirklees Stadium; Attendance: 15,367; Referee: Matthew Corlett

31 January 2026 30	Peterborough United	2–3	Huddersfield Town	Peterborough
15:00 GMT	Collins (yellow card) 20'; Nevett (yellow card) 25'; O'Brien-Brady (yellow card) 31'; Dornelly (yellow card) 57', (goal) 85'; Lees (yellow card) 59'; Lisbie 64'	Report	Sørensen 27'; Balker 47'; Ledson (yellow card) 49'; Charles (yellow card) 76'; Harness (yellow card) 79'; Humphreys 89'	Stadium: London Road Stadium; Attendance: 9,261; Referee: Lee Swabey

7 February 2026 31	Huddersfield Town	2–2	Blackpool	Huddersfield
15:00 GMT	Ledson (yellow card) 33'; Harness 74'; Wales (yellow card) 86'; Ashia 88'	Report	Fletcher 22'; Anderson 31'; Brown (yellow card) 35'; Walters (yellow card) 56'; Peacock-Farrell (yellow card) 70'; Casey (yellow card) 73'; Finnigan (yellow card) 90+4'	Stadium: Kirklees Stadium; Attendance: 16,951; Referee: Ross Joyce

14 February 2026 32	Stevenage	1–0	Huddersfield Town	Stevenage
12:30 GMT	Sweeney (yellow card) 44'; Phillips (yellow card) 61'; Piergianni 85'; Earley (yellow card) 90+6'	Report	Ledson (yellow card) 22'; Harness (yellow card) 24'; Ashia (yellow card) 90+9'	Stadium: Broadhall Way; Referee: Neil Hair
Note: Fixture was originally scheduled for a 15:00 kick-off, but was rescheduled for live Sky Sports broadcasting.

17 February 2026 33	Doncaster Rovers	1–0	Huddersfield Town	Doncaster
19:45 GMT	Byrne (yellow card) 28'; Molyneux 34' (pen.), (yellow card) 88'; Gotts (yellow card) 64'; Bailey (yellow card) 75'	Report	Nicholls (yellow card) 33'	Stadium: Eco-Power Stadium; Attendance: 9,118; Referee: Seb Stockbridge

21 February 2026 34	Huddersfield Town	2–1	Barnsley	Huddersfield
15:00 GMT	Ledson (yellow card) 46', (goal) 57'; Hardie 74'	Report	Gent (yellow card) 6'; McGoldrick 42'; O'Keeffe (yellow card) 90+5'	Stadium: Kirklees Stadium; Referee: Peter Wright

28 February 2026 35	Wigan Athletic	1–0	Huddersfield Town	Wigan
15:00 GMT	Weir 61', (yellow card) 72'; M.Smith (yellow card) 88'	Report	Sørensen (yellow card) 45'; Harness (yellow card) 52'; Roughan (yellow card) 84'	Stadium: Brick Community Stadium; Attendance: 12,811; Referee: Charles Breakspear

7 March 2026 36	Huddersfield Town	1–0	Rotherham United	Huddersfield
12:30 GMT	Agbaire 76' (o.g.)	Report	Rafferty (yellow card) 65'	Stadium: Kirklees Stadium; Attendance: 16,592; Referee: Martin Coy
Note: Fixture was originally scheduled for a 15:00 kick-off, but was brought forward for live Sky Sports broadcasting.

14 March 2026 37	Port Vale	0–0	Huddersfield Town	Burslem
15:00 GMT	Ojo (yellow card) 62'; Lawrence-Gabriel (yellow card) 74'; Brown (yellow card) 87'	Report	Wallace (yellow card) 89'	Stadium: Vale Park; Attendance: 6,878; Referee: Thomas Parsons

17 March 2026 38	Huddersfield Town	2–2	Lincoln City	Huddersfield
19:45 GMT	Hardie 15'; Ledson 20'; Feeney (yellow card) 40'; Gooch (yellow card) 45+2'; Nicholls (yellow card) 90'; Humphreys (yellow card) 90+7'	Report	Feeney 29' (o.g.); Bayliss (yellow card) 79'; Towler 90+3', (yellow card) 90+3'	Stadium: Kirklees Stadium; Attendance: 16,301; Referee: Benjamin Speedie

21 March 2026 39	Plymouth Argyle	3–1	Huddersfield Town	Plymouth
15:00 GMT	Hazard (yellow card) 18'; Dale (yellow card) 44', (goal) 47'; Pepple 59' (pen.); Oseni 73'; Amaechi (yellow card) 90+3'	Report	Roughan (yellow card) 12'; Mumba (yellow card) 18'; Humphreys 25'; Feeney (yellow card) 82'	Stadium: Home Park; Attendance: 16,266; Referee: Ruebyn Ricardo

3 April 2026 41	Huddersfield Town	1–1	Reading	Huddersfield
15:00 BST	Ledson (yellow card) 69'; Sebine (yellow card) 84'; Sørensen 90+6'	Report	O'Connor (yellow card) 24'; Wing 44', (yellow card) 69'; Savage (yellow card) 45'; Dorsett (yellow card) 66'	Stadium: Kirklees Stadium; Attendance: 17,148; Referee: Will Finnie

6 April 2026 42	Leyton Orient	1–2	Huddersfield Town	Leyton
15:00 BST	Balker 20' (o.g.); Archibald (yellow card) 90+1'; Morris (yellow card) 90+11'	Report	Harness (yellow card) 38'; Radulović 45'; McGuane (yellow card) 53'; Wallace (yellow card) 85'; Ledson 90+16'	Stadium: Brisbane Road; Attendance: 8,697; Referee: Matt Corlett

11 April 2026 43	Huddersfield Town	3–3	Wycombe Wanderers	Huddersfield
15:00 BST	Ledson 48'; Harness 75', 90+6'	Report	Lowe 35', 90+11'; Allen (yellow card) 36'; Norris (yellow card) 41'; Taylor 90'	Stadium: Kirklees Stadium; Referee: James Oldham

14 April 2026 40	Huddersfield Town	1–1	Cardiff City	Huddersfield
19:45 BST	Ledson 27'; Roughan (yellow card) 90+9'	Report	Robertson (yellow card) 45+1'; Lawlor (yellow card) 59'; Wintle (yellow card) 72'; Salech 90+5'; Colwill (yellow card) 90+8'	Stadium: Kirklees Stadium; Referee: Andrew Humphries
Note: Fixture was initially scheduled for 28 March, but was rearranged due to international call-ups within the Cardiff squad.

18 April 2026 44	Bolton Wanderers	3–3	Huddersfield Town	Bolton
12:30 BST	Toal 15', (yellow card) 81'; Johnston (yellow card) 52'; Osei-Tutu (red card) 54'; Kenny 78', (yellow card) 90+5'; Cissoko 90+11'; Gale (yellow card) 90+12'	Report	Ledson (yellow card) 12'; Kasumu 53', 67'; Harness 55' (pen.), (yellow card) 65'; Humphreys (yellow card) 62'; Balker (yellow card) 90+1'; Sørensen (yellow card) 90+9'	Stadium: Toughsheet Community Stadium; Attendance: 21,891; Referee: Jacob Miles
Note: Fixture was initially scheduled for a 12:30 kick-off, but was brought forward for live Sky Sports broadcasting.

25 April 2026 45	Huddersfield Town	1–4	Mansfield Town	Huddersfield
15:00 BST	Harness 60'; McGuane (yellow card) 90+3'	Report	Akins 15'; Russell (yellow card) 42'; Wallace 43' (o.g.); Hendry 51'; Irow (yellow card) 64', (goal) 65'	Stadium: Kirklees Stadium; Attendance: 17,843; Referee: Ross Joyce

2 May 2026 46	AFC Wimbledon	0–4	Huddersfield Town	Wimbledon, London
15:00 BST	Johnson (yellow card) 31'; Seddon (yellow card) 77'	Report	Sørensen 10'; Ledson (yellow card) 32'; May 57', 72'; Sebine 66'	Stadium: Plough Lane; Referee: George Laflin

=== FA Cup ===
Huddersfield were drawn away to Bolton Wanderers in the first round.

Win Draw Loss Fixtures

1 November 2025 First round	Bolton Wanderers	2–1	Huddersfield Town	Horwich
15:00 GMT	Cissoko 41'; Taylor 69'	Report	Ledson (yellow card) 45+1'; Radulović 63'; Low (yellow card) 90+1'	Stadium: Toughsheet Community Stadium; Attendance: 6,077; Referee: Ross Joyce

=== EFL Cup ===
Huddersfield were drawn at home to Leicester City in the first round, away to Sunderland in the second round and back at home to Manchester City in the third round.

Win Draw Loss Fixtures

13 August 2025 First round	Huddersfield Town	2–2 (3–2 p)	Leicester City	Huddersfield
19:45 BST	Charles (penalty missed) 65'; Vost 65'; Roughan (yellow card) 68'; Ashia 76'; Smith-Sway (yellow card) 90+3'	Report	Monga (yellow card) 14'; Choudhury 54'; Winks 68'	Stadium: Kirklees Stadium; Attendance: 6,884; Referee: David Webb
	Penalties
	Taylor (penalty missed); May (penalty scored); Castledine (penalty scored); Sørensen (penalty scored)		(penalty missed) Ayew; (penalty scored) Mavididi; (penalty scored) Thomas; (penalty missed) El Khannouss; (penalty missed) McAteer

26 August 2025 Second round	Sunderland	1–1 (5–6 p)	Huddersfield Town	Sunderland
19:45 BST	Masuaku (yellow card) 38'; Guiu 84'; Neil (yellow card) 90+4'	Report	Castledine 9'; Charles (yellow card) 38'	Stadium: Stadium of Light; Attendance: 22,249; Referee: Dean Whitestone
	Penalties
	Le Fée (penalty scored); Roberts (penalty scored); Neil (penalty scored); Rigg (penalty scored); Seelt (penalty scored); Aleksić (penalty missed)		(penalty scored) Kane; (penalty scored) Radulović; (penalty scored) Harness; (penalty scored) Wiles; (penalty scored) Gooch; (penalty scored) Kasumu

24 September 2025 Third round	Huddersfield Town	0–2	Manchester City	Huddersfield
19:45 BST		Report	Foden 18'; Savinho 74'	Stadium: Kirklees Stadium; Attendance: 22,052; Referee: Michael Salisbury

=== EFL Trophy ===
Huddersfield were drawn against Harrogate Town, Mansfield Town and Newcastle United U21 in the group stage. After finishing second in the group, Town were drawn away to Lincoln City in the round of 32, at home to Rotherham United in the round of 16 and home to Doncaster Rovers in the quarter-finals.

Pos	Div	Team	Pld	W	PW	PL	L	GF	GA	GD	Pts	Qualification
1	L2	Harrogate Town	3	3	0	0	0	5	1	+4	9	Advance to Round 2
2	L1	Huddersfield Town	3	2	0	0	1	9	4	+5	6	Advance to Round 2
3	ACA	Newcastle United U21	3	0	1	0	2	5	11	−6	2	
4	L1	Mansfield Town	3	0	0	1	2	3	6	−3	1	

Source: EFL

Win Draw Loss Fixtures

2 September 2025 Nor. Group F	Huddersfield Town	6–2	Newcastle United U21	Huddersfield
19:45 BST				Stadium: Kirklees Stadium

30 September 2025 North Group F	Harrogate Town	1–0	Huddersfield Town	Harrogate
19:45 BST	Taylor 11'	Report	Wallace (yellow card) 32'; Charles (yellow card) 48'; Smith-Sway (yellow card) 82'	Stadium: Wetherby Road; Attendance: 2,262 (877 away); Referee: Zac Kennard-Kettle

4 November 2025 Nor. Group F	Huddersfield Town	3–1	Mansfield Town	Huddersfield
19:45 GMT	Charles 3', 84'; Feeney 34'	Report	Dwyer 46'	Stadium: Kirklees Stadium; Attendance: 973; Referee: Paul Howard

2 December 2025 Round of 32	Lincoln City	0–2	Huddersfield Town	Lincoln
19:00 GMT	Varfolomeyev (yellow card) 22'; Draper (yellow card) 40'	Report	Taylor 49'; Kasumu (yellow card) 61'; Wallace 90'	Stadium: Sincil Bank; Attendance: 2,016; Referee: Benjamin Speedie

13 January 2026 Round of 16	Huddersfield Town	3–0	Rotherham United	Huddersfield
19:00 GMT	Harness (yellow card) 12'; Alves 36'; Sørensen 41'; Ashia 86'	Report		Stadium: Kirklees Stadium; Referee: Stephen Parkinson

10 February 2026 Quarter-finals	Huddersfield Town	1–1 (0–2 p)	Doncaster Rovers	Huddersfield
19:00 GMT	Ashia 52'; Kasumu (yellow card) 73'	Report	Pearson (yellow card) 18'; Sharp 35' (pen.); Maxwell (yellow card) 90'	Stadium: Kirklees Stadium; Referee: Tom Reeves
	Penalties
	May (penalty missed); Sørensen (penalty missed); Charles (penalty missed); Evans (penalty missed)		Molyneux (penalty missed); Close (penalty scored); Gotts (penalty scored)

== Statistics ==
=== Appearances and goals ===
Players with no appearances are not included on the list; italics indicate loaned in player

No.	Pos	Nat	Player	Total		League One		FA Cup		EFL Cup		EFL Trophy	
No.	Pos	Nat	Player	Apps	Goals	Apps	Goals	Apps	Goals	Apps	Goals	Apps	Goals
2	DF	(Denmark) DEN	Lasse Sørensen	51	5	26+17	4	1+0	0	1+1	0	5+0	1
3	DF	(Scotland) SCO	Murray Wallace	41	2	31+2	1	0+0	0	3+0	0	5+0	1
4	MF	(England) ENG	Ryan Ledson	47	7	41+3	7	1+0	0	0+0	0	0+2	0
5	DF	(Wales) WAL	Joe Low	30	2	26+2	2	1+0	0	0+0	0	1+0	0
6	DF	(England) ENG	Jack Whatmough	6	2	4+0	1	0+0	0	1+0	0	1+0	1
7	DF	(United States) USA	Lynden Gooch	37	2	22+10	2	1+0	0	2+0	0	1+1	0
8	MF	(England) ENG	Cameron Humphreys	22	2	17+4	2	0+0	0	0+0	0	0+1	0
9	FW	(Wales) WAL	Joe Taylor	27	7	5+14	4	0+1	0	1+1	0	5+0	3
10	MF	(Republic of Ireland) IRL	Marcus Harness	51	8	39+5	7	1+0	0	1+1	0	4+0	1
11	DF	(Netherlands) NED	Ruben Roosken	26	1	18+3	1	1+0	0	1+0	0	1+2	0
12	DF	(Suriname) SUR	Radinio Balker	29	1	27+0	1	0+0	0	0+0	0	2+0	0
14	MF	(England) ENG	Mickel Miller	17	0	4+9	0	1+0	0	0+0	0	1+2	0
15	FW	(Northern Ireland) NIR	Dion Charles	37	4	12+17	2	0+1	0	3+0	0	2+2	2
16	MF	(England) ENG	Herbie Kane	9	1	8+0	1	0+0	0	0+1	0	0+0	0
17	MF	(England) ENG	Marcus McGuane	15	0	7+6	0	0+0	0	0+0	0	2+0	0
18	MF	(Nigeria) NGR	David Kasumu	38	2	16+16	2	0+0	0	3+0	0	3+0	0
19	DF	(England) ENG	Bali Mumba	21	0	19+1	0	0+0	0	0+0	0	0+1	0
20	DF	(England) ENG	Josh Feeney	31	1	18+6	0	1+0	0	2+0	0	3+1	1
21	MF	(England) ENG	Antony Evans	9	0	3+5	0	0+0	0	0+0	0	0+1	0
22	GK	(England) ENG	Lee Nicholls	40	0	32+1	0	1+0	0	3+0	0	3+0	0
23	DF	(Republic of Ireland) IRL	Sean Roughan	40	0	26+6	0	0+0	0	3+0	0	5+0	0
24	FW	(Scotland) SCO	Bobby Wales	6	0	0+5	0	0+0	0	0+0	0	1+0	0
25	FW	(Serbia) SRB	Bojan Radulović	29	9	19+4	8	1+0	1	0+2	0	1+2	0
26	FW	(England) ENG	Alfie May	40	7	26+8	7	0+0	0	0+2	0	3+1	0
27	MF	(England) ENG	Will Alves	15	2	5+7	1	0+0	0	0+0	0	2+1	1
29	FW	(Scotland) SCO	Ryan Hardie	6	2	4+2	2	0+0	0	0+0	0	0+0	0
31	GK	(England) ENG	Jak Alnwick	6	0	3+2	0	0+0	0	0+0	0	1+0	0
33	GK	(New Zealand) NZL	Nik Tzanev	2	0	1+1	0	0+0	0	0+0	0	0+0	0
36	MF	(England) ENG	Cameron Ashia	31	6	4+17	3	0+1	0	2+1	1	4+2	2
37	DF	(England) ENG	Jay Smith-Sway	6	0	0+0	0	0+0	0	0+3	0	1+2	0
38	MF	(England) ENG	Daniel Vost	11	1	0+3	0	0+1	0	3+0	1	3+1	0
39	DF	(England) ENG	George Iorpenda	1	0	0+0	0	0+0	0	0+0	0	1+0	0
42	FW	(England) ENG	George Sebine	7	1	2+4	1	0+0	0	0+0	0	0+1	0
44	DF	(England) ENG	Omari Mrisho	1	0	0+0	0	0+0	0	0+0	0	0+1	0
46	MF	(England) ENG	Max Murray	1	0	0+1	0	0+0	0	0+0	0	0+0	0
Player(s) who featured but departed the club permanently during the season:
1	GK	(England) ENG	Owen Goodman	12	0	10+0	0	0+0	0	0+0	0	2+0	0
8	MF	(England) ENG	Ben Wiles	28	3	14+8	3	1+0	0	2+1	0	2+0	0
24	MF	(England) ENG	Leo Castledine	27	12	17+6	10	0+0	0	1+2	1	1+0	1
29	FW	(Netherlands) NED	Zépiqueno Redmond	3	1	0+2	1	0+0	0	1+0	0	0+0	0
