= Cameron Humphreys =

Cameron Humphreys may refer to:

- Cameron Humphreys (footballer, born 1998), English centre-back for Rotherham United
- Cameron Humphreys (footballer, born 2003), English midfielder for Ipswich Town
