= Daniel Vost =

English footballer (born 2006)

Personal information
- Full name: Daniel Jared Vost
- Date of birth: 17 April 2006 (age 20)
- Place of birth: Wirral, England
- Position: Midfielder

Team information
- Current team: Huddersfield Town
- Number: 28

Youth career
- Everton
- 2022–2025: Huddersfield Town

Senior career*
Years	Team	Apps	(Gls)
2025–	Huddersfield Town	3	(0)
2025	→ Warrington Town (loan)	1	(0)
- * Club domestic league appearances and goals as of 2 May 2026 (UTC)

Daniel Jared Vost (born 17 April 2006) is an English professional footballer who plays as a midfielder for EFL League One club Huddersfield Town.

== Career ==
=== Huddersfield Town ===
Vost signed his first professional contract on 16 May 2023, penning a two-year deal. He made his professional debut with Huddersfield Town on 3 September 2024, in a 2–1 defeat to Doncaster Rovers in the EFL Trophy. On 24 January 2025, he joined National League North side Warrington Town on loan. He made his debut for the club on 26 January 2025, in a 0–0 draw with Farsley Celtic.

Vost scored his first goal for Huddersfield Town on 13 August 2025, in a 2–2 draw with Leicester City in the EFL Cup. On 6 July 2026, he signed a new two-year contract with the club.

== Career statistics ==
As of match played 2 May 2026

Appearances and goals by club, season and competition
Club	Season	League			FA Cup		EFL Cup		Other		Total	
Club	Season	Division	Apps	Goals	Apps	Goals	Apps	Goals	Apps	Goals	Apps	Goals
Huddersfield Town	2024–25	League One	0	0	0	0	0	0	1 (Note: Appearances in EFL Trophy)	0	1	0
Huddersfield Town	2025–26	League One	3	0	1	0	3	1	4	0	11	1
Huddersfield Town	2026–27	League One	0	0	0	0	0	0	0	0	0	0
Huddersfield Town	Total		3	0	1	0	3	1	5	0	12	1
Warrington Town (loan)	2024–25	National League North	1	0	0	0	—		0	0	1	0
Career total			4	0	1	0	3	1	5	0	13	1
