= Nik Tzanev =

New Zealand footballer (born 1996)

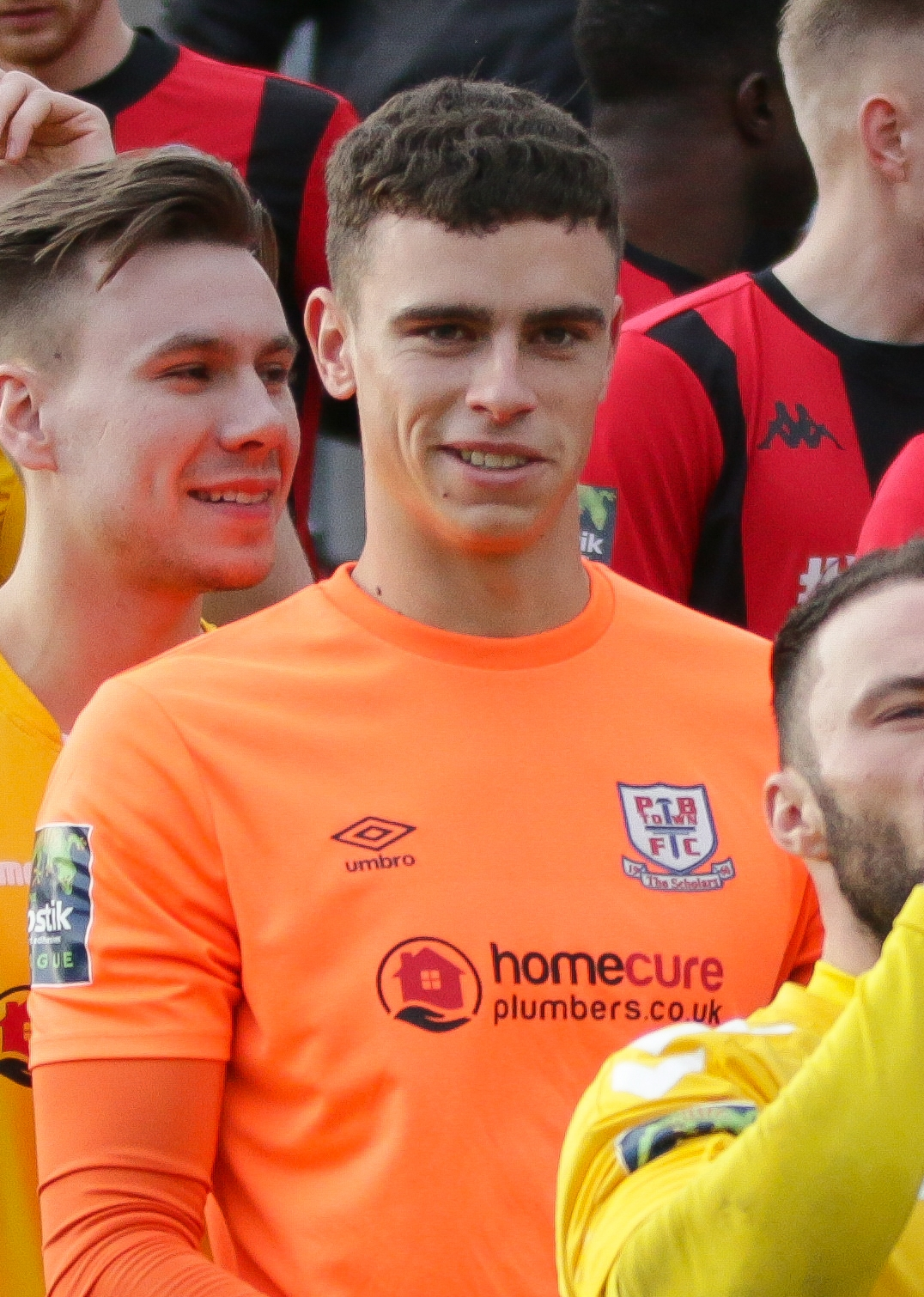
- Tzanev lining up for Potters Bar Town in 2019

Personal information
- Full name: Nikola Chivarov Tzanev
- Date of birth: 23 December 1996 (age 29)
- Place of birth: Wellington, New Zealand
- Height: 1.95 m (6 ft 5 in)
- Position: Goalkeeper

Team information
- Current team: Huddersfield Town
- Number: 33

Youth career
- Hampton & Richmond Borough
- Crystal Palace
- –2015: Brentford

Senior career*
Years	Team	Apps	(Gls)
2015–2016	Brentford	0	(0)
2015	→ Lewes (loan)	6	(0)
2017–2024	AFC Wimbledon	104	(0)
2019	→ Potters Bar Town (loan)	15	(0)
2019–2020	→ Sutton United (loan)	20	(0)
2024–2025	Northampton Town	17	(0)
2025–2026	Newport County	11	(0)
2026–	Huddersfield Town	2	(0)

International career^{‡}
2015	New Zealand U20	3	(0)
2018–	New Zealand	2	(0)
- * Club domestic league appearances and goals as of 13:10, 9 August 2026 (UTC) ‡ National team caps and goals as of 18:41, 23 November 2025 (UTC)

Nikola Chivarov Tzanev (born 23 December 1996) is a New Zealand professional footballer who plays as a goalkeeper for EFL League One club Huddersfield Town and the New Zealand national team.

Tzanev is a product of the Brentford Academy and began his professional career with the club. He began his senior career with AFC Wimbledon in 2017 and by 2021, had established himself as the club's first-choice goalkeeper. Following the loss of his first-choice status during the 2023–24 season and subsequent departure, Tzanev played for Northampton Town, Newport County and Huddersfield Town.

== Club career ==
=== Brentford ===
A goalkeeper, Tzanev moved from his native New Zealand to England in 2006. He trained with a Chelsea development programme and Hampton & Richmond Borough, before joining the academy at Crystal Palace. He moved to join the academy at Brentford and progressed through the ranks to sign a Youth Development contract in 2013, which enabled him to continue his education through to his A-levels. He made 39 appearances for the youth team during the final three seasons of his youth career and won the club's Youth Team Player of the Year award for his performances during the 2014–15 season.

Tzanev signed a one-year Development Squad contract at the end of the 2014–15 season, but made just eight appearances and played a month away on loan at Isthmian League Premier Division strugglers Lewes before his release at the end of the 2015–16 season.

=== AFC Wimbledon ===
==== 2016–2018 ====
During the course of the 2016–17 season, Tzanev trialled with EFL clubs Wycombe Wanderers and Hartlepool United. He joined the AFC Wimbledon Development Squad on trial in March 2017 and impressed enough to be awarded a contract until the end of the season on 28 April 2017. He was called into the first team squad for the club's final match of the season versus Oldham Athletic and remained an unused substitute during the 0–0 draw. Tzanev signed a new contract on 8 May 2017 and was an unused substitute on five occasions during the 2017–18 season.

==== 2018–2021 ====
Tzanev signed a new contract in July 2018, but received just one call into the first team squad during the first half of the 2018–19 season. On 18 January 2019, Tzanev joined Isthmian League Premier Division club Potters Bar Town on a one-month loan, which was subsequently extended until the end of the season. He made 15 appearances during his spell.

Having signed a contract extension in February 2019, injury to first-choice goalkeeper Nathan Trott allowed Tzanev to make his debut for the club on the opening day of the 2019–20 season, in a 2–1 defeat to Rotherham United. Tzanev made three further appearances before spending the remainder of the season away on loan at National League club Sutton United, whom he joined on 15 November 2019. He made 19 appearances before the season was ended early.

Tzanev served as backup to goalkeepers Connal Trueman and then Sam Walker for much of the 2020–21 season and played predominantly in cup matches. An injury suffered by Walker in March 2021 allowed Tzanev to break into the starting lineup for the first time in his career with the club and he finished the season with 19 appearances.

==== 2022–2024 ====
Ahead of the 2021–22 season, Tzanev was awarded squad number 1 and after starting each of the Dons' first eight matches of the campaign, he signed a new three-year contract. He made a career-high 53 appearances during a 2021–22 season which culminated in relegation to League Two. Tzanev made 41 appearances during the 2022–23 season, in which the club narrowly avoided a second-successive relegation. Tzanev spent the 2023–24 season behind loanee Alex Bass and made just 9 appearances, predominantly in cup competitions. Tzanev was released when his contract expired and ended his AFC Wimbledon career on 126 appearances.

=== Northampton Town ===
On 3 July 2024, Tzanev signed a one-year contract with League One club Northampton Town on a free transfer. In competition with Lee Burge, Tzanev made 23 appearances during the 2024–25 season and was released when his contract expired.

=== Newport County ===
On 17 June 2025, Tzanev joined League Two club Newport County on a free transfer and signed an undisclosed-length contract, effective 1 July 2025. He began the 2025–26 season as the club's starting goalkeeper and made 12 appearances, before being dropped to the bench in early October. After making just two further cup appearances, Tzanev transferred out of the club on 2 February 2026.

=== Huddersfield Town ===
On 2 February 2026, Tzanev joined League One club Huddersfield Town and on a free transfer and signed a contract running until the end of the 2025–26 season. Rarely included in the matchday squad, he started the final two matches of the season. On 1 July 2026, Tzanev signed a new one-year contract, with the option of a further year.

== International career ==
Tzanev won his maiden call up to the New Zealand U20 squad for two friendlies versus Uzbekistan in April 2015 and made his debut in the second match, playing the full 90 minutes. He was called into the New Zealand squad for the 2015 U20 World Cup, held on home turf and he made two appearances as the All Whites reached the last-16. He was subsequently called into the U23 squad for the 2015 Pacific Games, but failed to make an appearance.

Tzanev received his maiden senior international call-up for a friendly match versus Canada on 25 March 2018 and was an unused substitute during the 1–0 defeat. He was named in a youthful squad for the 2018 Intercontinental Cup and made his full international debut with a start in a 1–0 victory over Chinese Taipei on 5 June 2018. Call-ups for pairs of friendlies in October 2021 and June 2023 respectively yielded no appearances. More than five years after his first cap, Tzanev won his second with a start in a 1–1 friendly draw with DR Congo on 13 October 2023. Tzanev was named in the 2025 Canadian Shield squad and was an unused substitute in both matches. He won further call-ups in 2025 for pairs of friendlies in October and November, but he remained an unused substitute in all matches.

== Personal life ==
Tzanev was born in Wellington and moved to Auckland at age three, before moving to London in 2006 at age 9. He is of Bulgarian descent. Tzanev attended Hinchley Wood School.

== Career statistics ==
=== Club ===
As of match played 8 August 2026

Appearances and goals by club, season and competition
Club	Season	League			FA Cup		EFL Cup		Other		Total	
Club	Season	Division	Apps	Goals	Apps	Goals	Apps	Goals	Apps	Goals	Apps	Goals
Brentford	2015–16	Championship	0	0	0	0	0	0	―		0	0
Lewes (loan)	2015–16	IL Premier Division	6	0	―		―		―		6	0
AFC Wimbledon	2016–17	League One	0	0	―		―		―		0	0
AFC Wimbledon	2017–18	League One	0	0	0	0	0	0	0	0	0	0
AFC Wimbledon	2018–19	League One	0	0	0	0	0	0	0	0	0	0
AFC Wimbledon	2019–20	League One	2	0	0	0	1	0	1 (Note: Appearance(s) in EFL Trophy)	0	4	0
AFC Wimbledon	2020–21	League One	15	0	1	0	0	0	3	0	19	0
AFC Wimbledon	2021–22	League One	46	0	3	0	3	0	1	0	53	0
AFC Wimbledon	2022–23	League Two	39	0	2	0	0	0	0	0	41	0
AFC Wimbledon	2023–24	League Two	2	0	0	0	1	0	6	0	9	0
AFC Wimbledon	Total		104	0	6	0	5	0	11	0	126	0
Potters Bar Town (loan)	2018–19	IL Premier Division	15	0	―		―		0	0	15	0
Sutton United (loan)	2019–20	National League	20	0	―		―		2 (Note: Appearances in FA Trophy)	0	22	0
Northampton Town	2024–25	League One	17	0	1	0	1	0	4	0	23	0
Newport County	2025–26	League Two	11	0	1	0	1	0	1	0	14	0
Huddersfield Town	2025–26	League One	2	0	―		―		―		2	0
Huddersfield Town	2026–27	League One	0	0	0	0	0	0	0	0	0	0
Huddersfield Town	Total		2	0	0	0	0	0	0	0	2	0
Career total			175	0	7	0	7	0	18	0	207	0

=== International ===
As of match played 19 November 2025

Appearances and goals by national team and year
National team	Year	Apps	Goals
New Zealand	2018	1	0
New Zealand	2023	1	0
Total		2	0

== Honours ==
Individual

- Brentford Youth Team Player of the Year: 2014–15
