= Matty Young (footballer, born 2006) =

English footballer

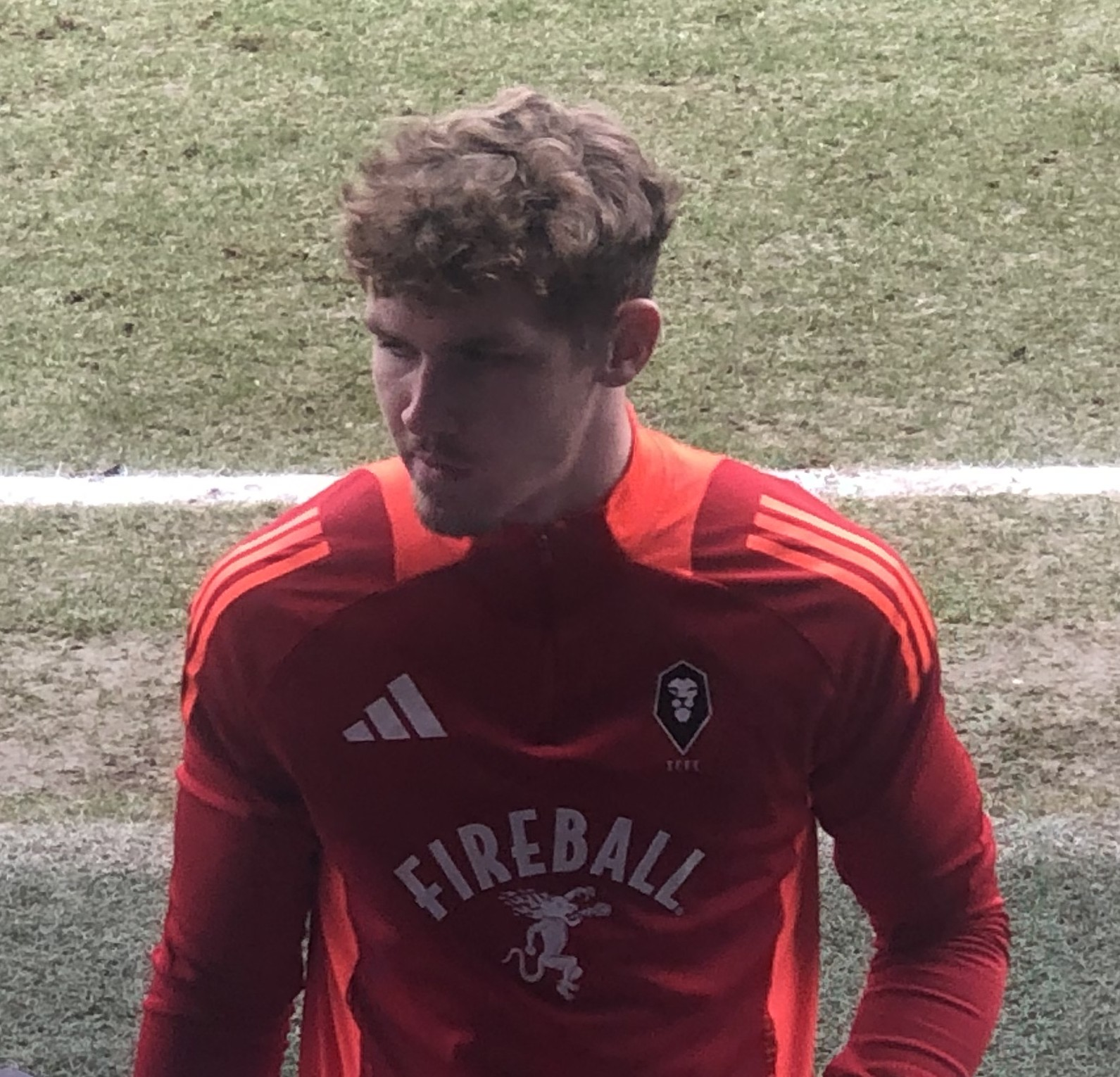
- Young in 2025.

Personal information
- Full name: Matthew Young
- Date of birth: 24 November 2006 (age 19)
- Place of birth: County Durham, England
- Height: 6 ft 3 in (1.91 m)
- Position: Goalkeeper

Team information
- Current team: Huddersfield Town (on loan from Sunderland)
- Number: 1

Youth career
- 2013–2023: Sunderland

Senior career*
Years	Team	Apps	(Gls)
2023–	Sunderland	0	(0)
2024	→ Darlington (loan)	14	(0)
2024–2025	→ Salford City (loan)	20	(0)
2025–2026	→ Salford City (loan)	44	(0)
2026–	→ Huddersfield Town (loan)	15	(0)

International career^{‡}
2024	England U18	1	(0)
2023–2024	England U19	2	(0)
2024–	England U20	2	(0)
- * Club domestic league appearances and goals as of 11:57, 22 November 2026 (UTC) ‡ National team caps and goals as of 15:48, 8 June 2025 (UTC)

Matthew Young (born 24 November 2006) is an English professional footballer who plays as a goalkeeper for EFL League One club Huddersfield Town on loan from Premier League club Sunderland.

== Club career ==
Young began his career at Sunderland at the age of 7, turning professional in November 2023. He signed on loan for non-league Darlington in February 2024, being praised in the media for his performances at the club, and winning the club's Young Player of the Season award.

Amidst reported interest from Notts County, Young moved on loan to Salford City in July 2024. Sunderland's sporting director Kristjaan Speakman said that the loan was "the perfect environment for him to continue his development". He made his Salford debut on 13 August 2024, in a 2–0 defeat in the EFL Cup against Doncaster Rovers.

On 24 July 2025, Young returned to Salford City for another season-long loan.

In June 2026, he was linked with a possible transfer to Bradford City. On 30 June 2026, Young joined EFL League One club Huddersfield Town on loan for the 2026–27 season.

== International career ==
In November 2023 Young received his first international call-up and made his debut for England under-19 in a victory over Mexico. In March 2024 he started for England under-18 against the Netherlands.

On 19 November 2024, Young made his U20 debut during a 1–1 draw away to Poland.

On 29 August 2025, Young was called up to the England under-21 team.

== Career statistics ==
As of match played 21 November 2026

Appearances and goals by club, season and competition
Club	Season	League			FA Cup		League Cup		Other		Total	
Club	Season	Division	Apps	Goals	Apps	Goals	Apps	Goals	Apps	Goals	Apps	Goals
Sunderland	2023–24	Championship	0	0	0	0	0	0	0	0	0	0
Sunderland	2024–25	Championship	0	0	0	0	0	0	0	0	0	0
Sunderland	2025–26	Premier League	0	0	0	0	0	0	0	0	0	0
Sunderland	2026–27	Premier League	0	0	0	0	0	0	0	0	0	0
Sunderland	Total		0	0	0	0	0	0	0	0	0	0
Darlington (loan)	2023–24	National League North	14	0	0	0	—		—		14	0
Salford City (loan)	2024–25	League Two	20	0	3	0	1	0	3 (Note: Appearances in the EFL Trophy)	0	27	0
Salford City (loan)	2025–26	League Two	44	0	3	0	0	0	3 (Note: Appearances in the play-offs)	0	50	0
Huddersfield Town (loan)	2026–27	League One	15	0	1	0	1	0	0	0	17	0
Career total			93	0	7	0	2	0	6	0	108	0
