= Leo Castledine =

English footballer (born 2005)

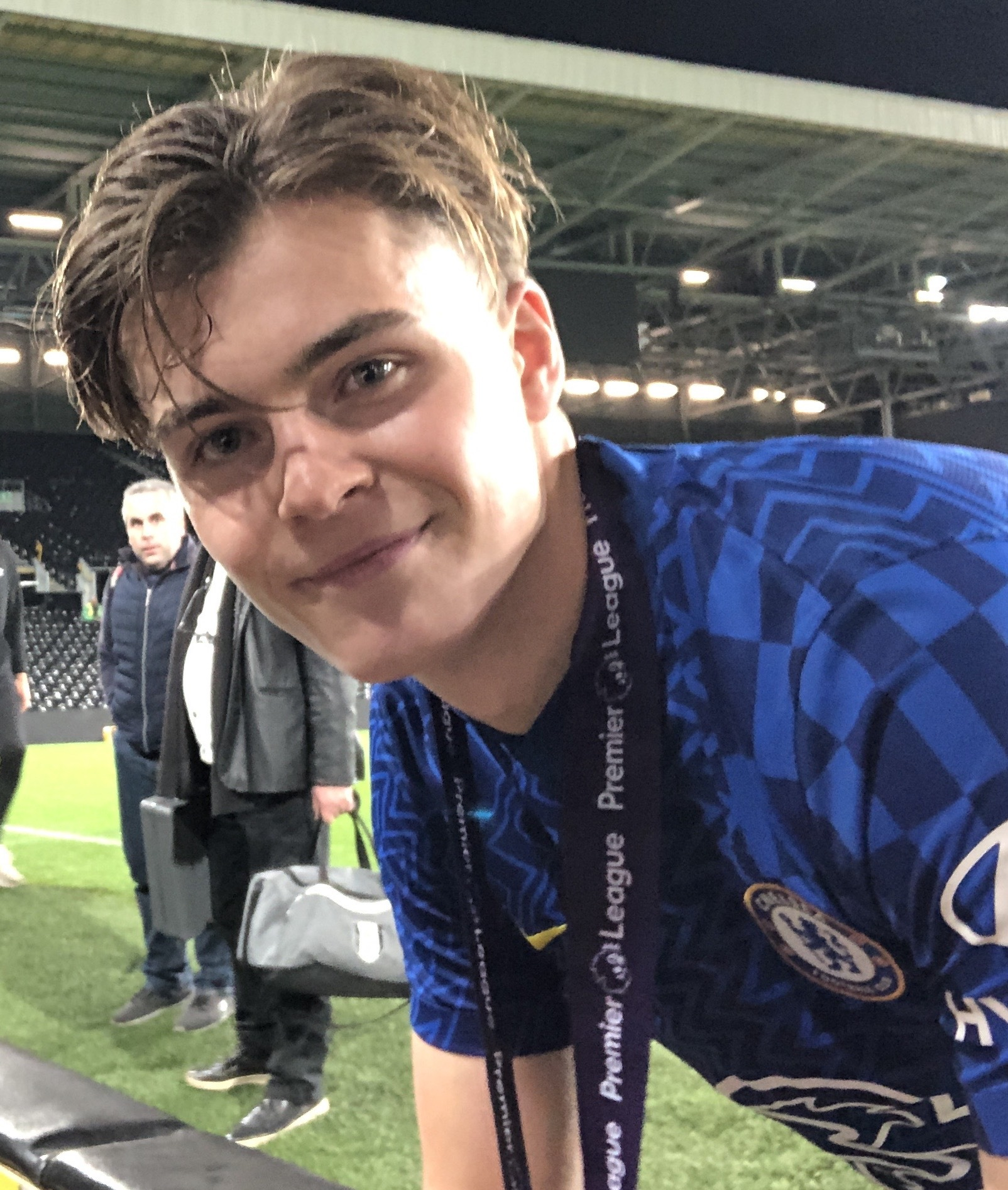
- Castledine with Chelsea in 2022

Personal information
- Full name: Leo Alexander Francis Castledine
- Date of birth: 20 August 2005 (age 21)
- Place of birth: Kingston upon Thames, England
- Height: 1.79 m (5 ft 10 in)
- Positions: Attacking midfielder; wide midfielder

Team information
- Current team: Middlesbrough
- Number: 19

Youth career
- 2011–2013: Chelsea
- 2013–2020: AFC Wimbledon
- 2020–2024: Chelsea

Senior career*
Years	Team	Apps	(Gls)
2024–2026	Chelsea	0	(0)
2024–2025	→ Shrewsbury Town (loan)	23	(2)
2025–2026	→ Huddersfield Town (loan)	23	(10)
2026–	Middlesbrough	9	(1)

International career^{‡}
2019	England U15	6	(0)
2021–2022	England U17	10	(2)
2022–2023	England U18	6	(1)
2023–2024	England U19	5	(2)
- * Club domestic league appearances and goals as of 00:12, 11 May 2026 (UTC) ‡ National team caps and goals as of 17:10, 9 January 2026 (UTC)

Leo Alexander Francis Castledine (born 20 August 2005) is an English professional footballer who plays as an attacking midfielder or wide midfielder for EFL Championship club Middlesbrough.

== Club career ==
=== Early career ===
Born in Kingston upon Thames, where he lived only 15 minutes away from the Cobham Training Centre, Castledine started his career with Chelsea, who he had supported growing up. He spent two years with Chelsea before moving to AFC Wimbledon at the age of seven. Growing up, he also played rugby, and was enrolled in the elite academy of professional club Harlequins.

Initially beginning his career with Wimbledon in a more defensive role, he moved up the pitch to operate as a midfielder. Settling into his new role well, he was involved in Wimbledon under-18's pre-season tour of Italy, playing alongside players four years his senior, and went on to make his under-18 debut in 2019 – becoming the youngest Wimbledon player to ever do so.

=== Chelsea ===
A year later, in March 2020, he rejoined Chelsea, naming Mason Mount and Jack Grealish as his favourite current players. He signed his first professional contract with The Blues in August 2022, on his seventeenth birthday, and has already been called up to train with the first team.

Castledine made his senior debut for Chelsea as a substitute in a 6–1 EFL Cup semi-final second-leg win over Middlesbrough on 23 January 2024.

==== Shrewsbury Town (loan) ====
On 26 August 2024, Castledine joined League One side Shrewsbury Town on a season-long loan deal. He made his debut for the club the next day on 27 August 2024, in a 2–0 defeat to Bolton Wanderers in the EFL Cup. He scored his first goal for the club on 31 August 2024, in a 3–0 win against Leyton Orient.

==== Huddersfield Town (loan) ====
On 1 August 2025, he returned to League One, joining Huddersfield Town on a season-long loan. He made his debut for the club on 13 August 2025, in a 2–2 draw with Leicester City in the EFL Cup which Huddersfield won on penalties. He scored his first goal for the club on 26 August 2025, in a 1–1 draw with Sunderland. Having scored five goals in his final month with the club prior to his recall, he was named EFL Young Player of the Month and EFL League One Player of the Month for December 2025.

=== Middlesbrough ===
On 9 January 2026, Castledine signed for Championship side Middlesbrough on a four-and-a-half year deal for an undisclosed fee, reported to be a little under £1 million. He made his debut for the club on 16 January 2026, in a 3–2 win against West Bromwich Albion. He scored his first goal for the club on 14 March 2026, in a 1–1 draw with Bristol City.

== International career ==
Castledine has represented England at under-15, under-17 and under-18 level.

On 15 November 2023, Castledine scored on his England U19 debut during a 6–0 win over Romania in Marbella.

== Personal life ==
He is the son of former Wimbledon footballer, and television presenter, Stewart Castledine, as well as former Homes Under the Hammer host Lucy Alexander. Leo has an older sister, Kitty, an actress who currently stars in EastEnders.

== Career statistics ==
As of match played 12 May 2026

Appearances and goals by club, season and competition
Club	Season	League			FA Cup		League Cup		Other		Total	
Club	Season	Division	Apps	Goals	Apps	Goals	Apps	Goals	Apps	Goals	Apps	Goals
Chelsea U21	2022–23	—			—		—		5 (Note: Appearances in EFL Trophy)	0	5	0
Chelsea U21	2023–24	—			—		—		3	0	3	0
Chelsea U21	Total		—		—		—		8	0	8	0
Chelsea	2023–24	Premier League	0	0	0	0	1	0	—		1	0
Chelsea	2024–25	Premier League	0	0	0	0	0	0	0	0	0	0
Chelsea	2025–26	Premier League	0	0	0	0	0	0	0	0	0	0
Chelsea	Total		0	0	0	0	1	0	0	0	1	0
Shrewsbury Town (loan)	2024–25	League One	23	2	1	0	1	0	1	0	26	2
Huddersfield Town (loan)	2025–26	League One	23	10	0	0	3	1	1	1	27	12
Middlesbrough	2025–26	Championship	9	1	—		—		2 (Note: Appearances in EFL Championship play-offs)	0	11	1
Middlesbrough	2026–27	Championship	0	0	0	0	0	0	0	0	0	0
Middlesbrough	Total		9	1	0	0	0	0	2	0	11	1
Career total			55	13	1	0	5	1	12	1	73	15

== Honours ==
Individual

- EFL League One Player of the Month: December 2025
- EFL Young Player of the Month: December 2025
