= Marcus Harness =

Irish footballer (born 1996)

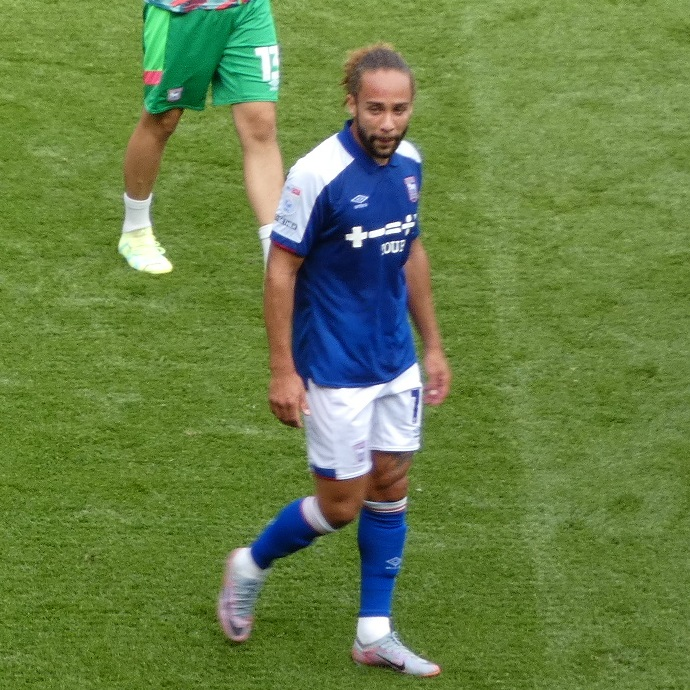
- Marcus Harness with Ipswich Town in August 2023

Personal information
- Full name: Marcus Anthony Myers-Harness
- Date of birth: 24 February 1996 (age 30)
- Place of birth: Coventry, England
- Height: 6 ft 0 in (1.82 m)
- Position: Winger

Team information
- Current team: Huddersfield Town
- Number: 10

Youth career
- Coventry City
- 2010–2013: Burton Albion

Senior career*
Years	Team	Apps	(Gls)
2013–2019	Burton Albion	68	(5)
2015	→ Ilkeston (loan)		
2015–2016	→ Aldershot Town (loan)	2	(0)
2017–2018	→ Port Vale (loan)	35	(1)
2019–2022	Portsmouth	111	(23)
2022–2025	Ipswich Town	76	(10)
2024–2025	→ Derby County (loan)	41	(4)
2025–	Huddersfield Town	44	(7)
- * Club domestic league appearances and goals as of 23:42, 4 May 2026 (UTC)

Marcus Anthony Myers-Harness (born 24 February 1996) is a professional footballer who plays as a winger for EFL League One club Huddersfield Town. Born in England, he represents the Republic of Ireland in competition.

Harness made his competitive first-team debut for Burton Albion at age 17 in September 2013. He helped the club to win the League Two title in the 2014–15 season and then had loan spells at Ilkeston and Aldershot Town, before he helped Burton to win promotion out of League One in 2015–16. He joined Port Vale on loan for the 2017–18 season. He signed for Portsmouth in July 2019 and played for the club on the losing side of the 2020 EFL Trophy final. He switched to fellow League One side Ipswich Town in July 2022 and helped the club to secure back-to-back promotions into the Premier League in the 2022–23 and 2023–24 seasons. He debuted in the Premier League before joining Derby County on loan for the 2024–25 season. He signed with Huddersfield Town in June 2025.

== Club career ==
=== Burton Albion ===
Harness spent time in the youth team at Coventry City before switching to Burton Albion. He made his first competitive appearance for Burton in a 1–0 defeat to Notts County at Meadow Lane in a Football League Trophy tie on 3 September 2013. He made his league debut on 22 March 2014, coming on for Alex MacDonald 68 minutes into a 1–0 defeat to Scunthorpe United at Glanford Park. He made his first league start on 3 May, in a 1–0 defeat to Southend United at Roots Hall; this was his fourth and final appearance of the 2013–14 campaign.

He signed a two-year professional contract in May 2014. On 27 August 2014, he was voted man of the match in Burton's 1–0 win over Premier League side Queens Park Rangers in a League Cup tie at the Pirelli Stadium; he won a free kick on the edge of the box that was scored by Adam McGurk. He played 22 games throughout the 2014–15 season as Burton won promotion as champions of League Two.

On 7 August 2015, he joined Northern Premier League Premier Division side Ilkeston on a one-month loan. He was sent off during injury-time in a 4–3 win over Stourbridge on 23 August. Manager Gavin Strachan extended his loan spell at the Robins until the new year after he made a positive start to the season. However, Burton recalled him to allow him a chance to play higher-level football, and caretaker manager Andy Watson said that "we were delighted to have had Marcus here and his loan deal wasn't far from ending". On 27 November 2015, Harness joined National League club Aldershot Town on a five-week loan. However, he made just two substitute appearances for Barry Smith's Shots during his spell at the Recreation Ground. He went on to make five substitute appearances for Burton as the club achieved promotion out of League One, and he "impressed with his pace and direct running" during these games and was named as Burton's 'Most Improved Young Player' for the 2015–16 season, after which his contract was extended for a further year. He played ten Championship matches in the 2016–17 season, and Albion took up a one-year extension to Harness's contract in May 2017.

On 18 July 2017, he joined League Two side Port Vale on loan for the 2017–18 season. Manager Neil Aspin played Harness just behind striker Tom Pope, in an attacking midfield role that demanded a lot of hard work. He scored his first goal for the "Valiants" on 12 December, in a 3–2 defeat at Yeovil Town in the FA Cup, and said "it was good to finally get a goal, it has been a long time coming". He scored his first league goal 11 days later to secure a point away at Colchester United, leading Aspin to say "he can only go from strength to strength now he is starting to chip in with goals". He signed a new two-and-a-half-year contract with the "Brewers" in January.

He scored his first goal for Burton in a 2–1 EFL Trophy defeat to Walsall on 4 September 2018. On 5 January, he scored a hat-trick in a 4–0 win at Rochdale. Having successfully broken into Nigel Clough's first-team during the 2018–19 season, he totalled six goals in 39 games.

=== Portsmouth ===
On 18 July 2019, Harness joined League One rivals Portsmouth on a three-year deal for an undisclosed fee. He scored his first goal for Pompey in a 2–1 defeat at Sunderland on 17 August. He scored a total of three goals in four games before being sidelined with a thigh strain picked up in a 1–1 draw at Blackpool a fortnight later. He disappointed manager Kenny Jackett with his performances upon returning to fitness. He was dropped in favour of Ronan Curtis and Ryan Williams, before regaining his first-team spot in December. He finished the 2019–20 season strongly, scoring none goals and providing seven assists in 37 games, often making a big impact from the bench; he earned himself praise from Jackett, who said "he has got a very, very good future ahead of him". Portsmouth qualified for the play-offs after finishing fourth, but lost on penalties following a 2–2 aggregate draw with Oxford United; he had scored Portsmouth's goal in the second leg, which would have been the winner if not for Oxford's equaliser.

Having scored a brace against Colchester United in the EFL Trophy, Harness scored a hat-trick playing as a number ten in a 4–2 win at former club Burton Albion on 3 October 2020. His third strike of the game, a "deft clip into the far bottom corner", would win him the League One Goal of the Month award; the goal was described by pundit Don Goodman as "nothing short of sublime". On 13 March 2021, he played in the 2020 EFL Trophy final, which had been postponed from the previous year due to the COVID-19 pandemic; he entered the game as a half-time substitute for Jordy Hiwula, which ended as a 0–0 draw, with Salford City winning the penalty shoot-out. He was a regular in the 2020–21 league season and was watched by Ireland manager Stephen Kenny. He achieved new manager Danny Cowley's target of ten goals for the season, however, Portsmouth missed out on the play-offs after finishing in eighth-place.

In January 2022, Cowley said the club's priority would be to extend Harness' contract as he was the stand-out performer in scoring ten goals from midfield in the first half of the season. Harness was though sent off for the first time in his career for fouling Ross Sykes in "a clear act of petulance" during a 4–0 win over Accrington Stanley at Fratton Park on 5 March. Portsmouth extended his contract as Cowley rated him as a Championship quality player. He scored 12 goals from 44 appearances in the 2021–22 season. However, Portsmouth again fell short of the play-offs.

=== Ipswich Town ===
Harness signed for Ipswich Town on a three-year deal (with the club retaining a further 12-month option) on 15 July 2022 after Ipswich paid Portsmouth an undisclosed fee (later revealed to be £750,000); striker Joe Pigott went the other way on a season-long loan as part of the deal. Town boss Kieran McKenna said that Harness was a good fit for the club and was entering his prime years. Harness was named as the club's Player of the Month for August after scoring five goals. He underwent minor knee surgery on a small meniscus tear in November. He scored eight goals in 47 games in the 2022–23 campaign as Ipswich secured promotion out of League One as runners-up to Plymouth Argyle. On 4 November 2023, he came off the bench to score both Ipswich's goals in a 2–2 draw at Birmingham City and said he hoped to earn more starts as a result. He scored four goals and provided two assists in 39 games as the club secured promotion into the Premier League with a second-place finish at the end of the 2023–24 Championship season.

He played two Premier League games, making substitute appearances against Liverpool and Manchester City. On 30 August 2024, Harness returned to the Championship, joining Derby County on a season-long loan deal. Harness made his Derby debut against Cardiff City on 14 September. He made his first start for Derby at Sunderland on 1 October and scored his first goal for Derby in a 2–0 win over Queens Park Rangers on 5 October. After the departure of Paul Warne as Derby manager in February 2025, Harness found himself operating in a forward role under new manager John Eustace. He scored and provided an assist in Derby's 2–0 victory against Coventry City, with two further goals coming four days later in a 3–2 victory against Plymouth Argyle. He was nominated for the EFL Championship Player of the Month award for March. He made 27 starts and 15 substitute appearances, scoring four goals and assisting three times, as the Rams finished in 19th place. He was released by Ipswich upon the expiry of his contract.

=== Huddersfield Town ===
On 2 June 2025, Harness agreed to join League One club Huddersfield Town on a three-year contract to start on 1 July. He had previously worked with manager Lee Grant when the latter was a first-team coach at Ipswich and said it was "a no-brainer" to reunite with him at Huddersfield. He scored eight goals across 51 games in the 2025–26 campaign, finishing as runners-up in the club's Player of the Season award. Huddersfield finished eight points adrift of the play-offs, however, and said the club would need to have some "tough conversations" with the squad.

== International career ==
Harness is of Irish descent through his mother. He declared his intention to represent the Republic of Ireland in July 2019.

== Career statistics ==
As of match played 2 May 2026

Appearances and goals by club, season and competition
Club	Season	League			FA Cup		League Cup		Other		Total	
Club	Season	Division	Apps	Goals	Apps	Goals	Apps	Goals	Apps	Goals	Apps	Goals
Burton Albion	2013–14	League Two	3	0	0	0	0	0	1 (Note: Appearances in the Football League Trophy / EFL Trophy)	0	4	0
Burton Albion	2014–15	League Two	18	0	1	0	2	0	1	0	22	0
Burton Albion	2015–16	League One	5	0	0	0	0	0	0	0	5	0
Burton Albion	2016–17	Championship	10	0	1	0	2	0	—		13	0
Burton Albion	2017–18	Championship	0	0	0	0	0	0	—		0	0
Burton Albion	2018–19	League One	32	5	0	0	4	0	3 (Note: Appearance(s) in the EFL Trophy)	1	39	6
Burton Albion	Total		68	5	2	0	8	0	5	1	83	6
Aldershot Town (loan)	2015–16	National League	2	0	0	0	—		0	0	2	0
Port Vale (loan)	2017–18	League Two	35	1	3	1	1	0	3	0	42	2
Portsmouth	2019–20	League One	25	5	4	0	2	1	6 (Note: 4 appearances and 2 goals in the EFL Trophy and 2 appearances and 1 goal in the play-offs)	3	37	9
Portsmouth	2020–21	League One	46	7	3	1	2	0	2	2	53	10
Portsmouth	2021–22	League One	40	11	2	1	0	0	2	0	44	12
Portsmouth	Total		111	23	9	2	4	1	10	5	134	31
Ipswich Town	2022–23	League One	40	6	3	0	1	0	3	2	47	8
Ipswich Town	2023–24	Championship	34	4	0	0	4	0	—		38	4
Ipswich Town	2024–25	Premier League	2	0	0	0	1	0	—		3	0
Ipswich Town	Total		76	10	3	0	6	0	3	2	88	12
Derby County (loan)	2024–25	Championship	41	4	1	0	—		—		42	4
Huddersfield Town	2025–26	League One	44	7	1	0	2	0	4	1	51	8
Huddersfield Town	2026–27	League One	0	0	0	0	0	0	0	0	0	0
Huddersfield Town	Total		44	7	1	0	2	0	4	1	51	8
Career total (Note: Statistics for Ilkeston not known.)			377	50	19	3	21	1	25	9	442	63

== Honours ==
Burton Albion

- Football League One second-place promotion: 2015–16
- Football League Two: 2014–15

Portsmouth

- EFL Trophy runner-up: 2019–20

Ipswich Town

- EFL Championship second-place promotion: 2023–24
- EFL League One second-place promotion: 2022–23
