= Bali Mumba =

English footballer (born 2001)

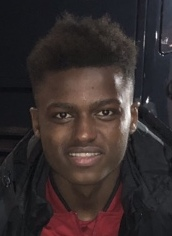
- Mumba in 2018

Personal information
- Full name: Bali Mumba
- Date of birth: 8 October 2001 (age 25)
- Place of birth: South Shields, England
- Height: 5 ft 6 in (1.68 m)
- Positions: Full-back; wing-back; winger

Team information
- Current team: Huddersfield Town
- Number: 19

Youth career
- 2010–2018: Sunderland

Senior career*
Years	Team	Apps	(Gls)
2018–2020	Sunderland	5	(0)
2020	→ South Shields (loan)	3	(2)
2020–2023	Norwich City	5	(0)
2022	→ Peterborough United (loan)	10	(0)
2022–2023	→ Plymouth Argyle (loan)	41	(6)
2023–2026	Plymouth Argyle	111	(3)
2026–	Huddersfield Town	17	(2)

International career^{‡}
2016	England U16	3	(0)
2017	England U17	2	(0)
2018	England U18	12	(0)
2019	England U19	1	(0)
- * Club domestic league appearances and goals as of 15 April 2026 (UTC) ‡ National team caps and goals as of 18:43, 26 September 2019 (UTC)

Bali Mumba (born 8 October 2001) is an English professional footballer who plays as a full-back or winger for EFL League One club Huddersfield Town.

== Club career ==
=== Sunderland ===
Mumba made his senior debut for Sunderland against Wolverhampton Wanderers on the last day of the 2017–18 EFL Championship season, coming on as an 87th-minute substitute for captain John O'Shea, who handed him the captain's armband as he entered the field of play, making him the club's youngest ever captain for the few minutes of play remaining. On 2 November 2018, Mumba signed his first professional contract with the club until 2021. He joined South Shields on loan in March 2020, scoring in his second game, at home to FC United of Manchester.

=== Norwich City ===
In July 2020, Mumba joined Norwich City on a four-year deal. On 21 August 2021, he made his Premier League debut in a 5–0 defeat against Manchester City.

==== Loan to Peterborough ====
On 6 January 2022, Mumba joined EFL Championship side Peterborough United on loan for the remainder of the 2021–22 season. He scored the winner on his debut in a 2–1 win against Bristol Rovers in the FA Cup third round.

==== Loan to Plymouth ====
On 14 July 2022, Mumba joined EFL League One club Plymouth Argyle on loan for the 2022–23 season. An impressive start to life at Home Park saw Plymouth sitting top of the league with Mumba winning the EFL Young Player of the Month award for September 2022.

Mumba would play 47 games and score eight times for Argyle as they went on to win the League One title, and finished as runners-up in the EFL Trophy, with Mumba starting in the Wembley final. The majority of Mumba's appearances came at wing-back in a 3–4–2–1 formation, often rotating flanks with captain Joe Edwards.

At the end of season, Mumba was named the Argyle fans' Young Player of the Season, his teammates' Player of the Season, and was honoured at the EFL Awards as the division's Young Player of the Season.

=== Plymouth Argyle ===
On 21 July 2023, Mumba signed for Plymouth Argyle on a permanent basis, signing a four-year contract with the club, for a reported £1 million transfer fee. This would equal Plymouth's all-time record fee that was paid to sign Morgan Whittaker earlier that same week.

On 5 August 2023, Mumba scored in his second-debut for the club, in a 3–1 EFL Championship win over Huddersfield Town, while playing on the left-wing in a 4–3–3. He joined Huddersfield Town in January 2026.

=== Huddersfield Town ===
On 15 January 2026, Mumba joined Huddersfield Town, signing a contract until 2029 for an undisclosed fee.

== International career ==
Mumba has represented England at under-16, under-17, under-18 and under-19 level. His parents are Congolese.

== Career statistics ==
As of matches played 4 January 2026

Appearances and goals by club, season and competition
Club	Season	League			FA Cup		EFL Cup		Other		Total	
Club	Season	Division	Apps	Goals	Apps	Goals	Apps	Goals	Apps	Goals	Apps	Goals
Sunderland	2017–18	Championship	1	0	0	0	0	0	0	0	1	0
Sunderland	2018–19	League One	4	0	2	0	0	0	2 (Note: Appearances in EFL Trophy)	0	8	0
Sunderland	2019–20	League One	0	0	0	0	1	0	0	0	1	0
Sunderland	Total		5	0	2	0	1	0	2	0	10	0
Norwich City	2020–21	Championship	4	0	1	0	1	0	—		6	0
Norwich City	2021–22	Premier League	1	0	0	0	2	0	—		3	0
Norwich City	2022–23	Championship	0	0	0	0	0	0	—		0	0
Norwich City	Total		5	0	1	0	3	0	—		9	0
Norwich City U23	2020–21	—			—		—		1	0	1	0
Peterborough United (loan)	2021–22	Championship	10	0	3	1	—		—		13	1
Plymouth Argyle (loan)	2022–23	League One	41	6	1	0	0	0	4	0	46	6
Plymouth Argyle	2023–24	Championship	43	3	3	0	1	0	—		47	3
Plymouth Argyle	2024–25	Championship	43	0	2	0	1	0	—		46	0
Plymouth Argyle	2025–26	League One	25	0	1	0	2	0	0	0	28	0
Plymouth Argyle	Total		111	3	6	0	4	0	0	0	121	3
Huddersfield Town	2025–26	League One	0	0	0	0	0	0	0	0	0	0
Career total			172	9	13	1	8	0	7	0	200	10

== Honours ==
Plymouth Argyle

- EFL League One: 2022–23
- EFL Trophy runner-up: 2022–23

Individual

- EFL League One Young Player of the Season: 2022–23
- EFL League One Team of the Season: 2022–23
- EFL Young Player of the Month: September 2022
