= Lasse Sørensen (footballer, born 1999) =

Danish footballer (born 1999)

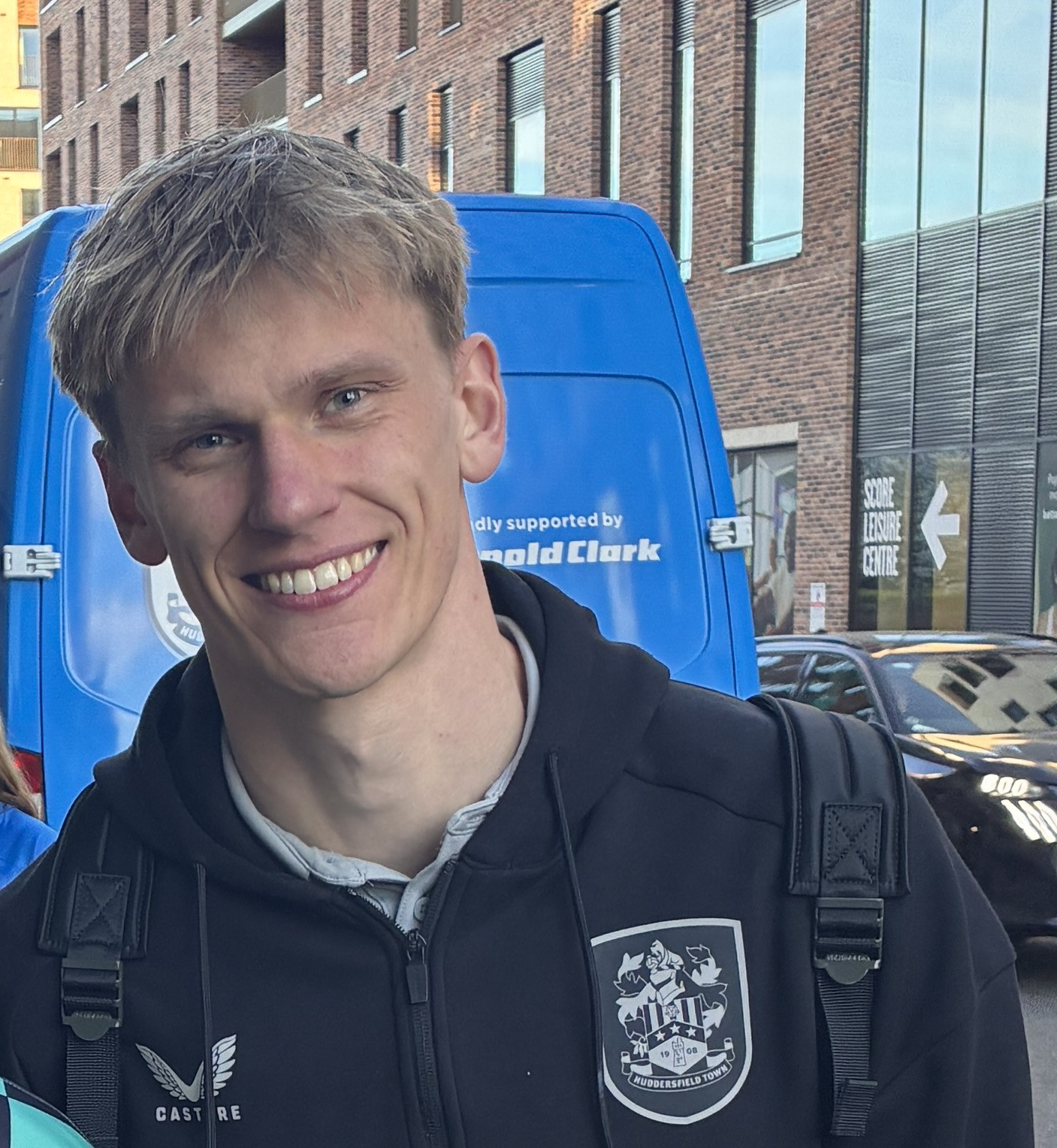
- Sørensen in 2026

Personal information
- Full name: Lasse Sørensen
- Date of birth: 21 October 1999 (age 27)
- Place of birth: Vejen, Denmark
- Height: 6 ft 1 in (1.85 m)
- Positions: Midfielder; wing-back

Team information
- Current team: Huddersfield Town
- Number: 2

Youth career
- 2015–2016: Esbjerg fB
- 2016–2018: Stoke City

Senior career*
Years	Team	Apps	(Gls)
2018–2021	Stoke City	8	(0)
2020–2021	→ Milton Keynes Dons (loan)	24	(0)
2021–2024	Lincoln City	115	(8)
2024–	Huddersfield Town	73	(3)

International career
2015	Denmark U16	3	(0)
2015–2016	Denmark U17	13	(0)
2016	Denmark U18	2	(0)
2017–2018	Denmark U19	4	(0)
2018	Denmark U20	2	(0)
- * Club domestic league appearances and goals as of 13:31, 18 April 2026 (UTC)

Lasse Sørensen (born 21 October 1999) is a Danish professional footballer who plays mainly as a wing back for EFL League One club Huddersfield Town. He is also able to play as a midfielder.

== Career ==
=== Stoke City ===
Sørensen was born in Vejen and began his career with the youth team of Danish Superliga side Esbjerg fB before moving to English side Stoke City in January 2016. He joined up with the first team after impressing manager Paul Lambert playing for the club's under-23 side towards the end of the 2017–18 campaign.

Sørensen made his professional debut on 13 May 2018 in a Premier League match against Swansea City, he played 76 minutes as already relegated Stoke won 2–1. Sørensen signed a long-term contract with Stoke in July 2018. His only appearance in the 2018–19 season came against Preston North End on 26 January 2019.

Sørensen made no appearances in the 2019–20 season until March 2020 when the league was suspended due to the COVID-19 pandemic. During the lockdown Sørensen recorded high running stats tracked on GPS training-vests. His work was rewarded with a start in the first match of the restart away at Reading on 20 June 2020. He made five more appearances towards the end of the campaign as Stoke finished in 15th position.

On 4 September 2020 Sørensen joined EFL League One side Milton Keynes Dons on loan for the 2020–21 season. He made his debut for the club on 5 September 2020 in a 1–0 EFL Cup first round home defeat to Coventry City. Whilst on loan, on 8 December 2020 Sørensen scored his first professional goal in a 6–0 EFL Trophy Round of 32 home victory over Norwich City U21. Sørensen made 34 appearances for the Dons as they finished in 13th position.

=== Lincoln City ===
On 23 July 2021, Sørensen joined EFL League One club Lincoln City for an undisclosed fee, signing a long-term contract with the Imps. He would make his Lincoln City debut on the opening day of the season against Gillingham. He would score his first goal for the club on 2 October 2021, at home to Plymouth Argyle. He was awarded the clubs Goal of the 2022–23 Season for his strike against Wycombe Wanderers, scoring a goal from his own half.

In the 2023–24 season he was given the Partners Player of the Season award. The club activated an option his contract following the end of the season. Sørensen made 136 appearances over three seasons and scored 10 goals before moving to Huddersfield Town.

=== Huddersfield Town ===
On 18 June 2024, Sørensen joined Huddersfield Town for an undisclosed fee on a three-year deal.

== Career statistics ==
As of 18 April 2026

Appearances and goals by club, season and competition
Club	Season	League			FA Cup		League Cup		Other		Total	
Club	Season	Division	Apps	Goals	Apps	Goals	Apps	Goals	Apps	Goals	Apps	Goals
Stoke City	2017–18	Premier League	1	0	0	0	0	0	—		1	0
Stoke City	2018–19	Championship	1	0	0	0	0	0	—		1	0
Stoke City	2019–20	Championship	6	0	0	0	0	0	—		6	0
Stoke City	2020–21	Championship	0	0	0	0	0	0	—		0	0
Stoke City	Total		8	0	0	0	0	0	—		8	0
Stoke City U23	2018–19	—	—		—		—		2 (Note: Appearances in EFL Trophy)	0	2	0
Milton Keynes Dons (loan)	2020–21	League One	24	0	3	0	1	0	6	1	34	1
Lincoln City	2021–22	League One	30	1	0	0	1	0	3	0	34	1
Lincoln City	2022–23	League One	41	3	1	0	3	0	6	0	51	3
Lincoln City	2023–24	League One	44	4	1	1	3	1	3	0	51	6
Lincoln City	Total		115	8	2	1	7	1	12	0	136	10
Huddersfield Town	2024–25	League One	32	0	0	0	2	0	3	0	37	0
Huddersfield Town	2025–26	League One	41	3	1	0	2	0	5	1	49	4
Huddersfield Town	Total		73	3	1	0	4	0	8	1	86	4
Career total			220	11	6	1	12	1	28	2	266	15
