= Cameron Ashia =

English footballer (born 2005)

Personal information
- Full name: Cameron James Nii Adjei Ashia
- Date of birth: 22 April 2005 (age 21)
- Place of birth: Wandsworth, England
- Position: Midfielder

Team information
- Current team: Huddersfield Town
- Number: 24

Youth career
- –2022: Fox Soccer Academy
- 2022–2023: Derby County

Senior career*
Years	Team	Apps	(Gls)
2024–	Huddersfield Town	21	(3)
2025	→ Torquay United (loan)	0	(0)
- * Club domestic league appearances and goals as of 1 May 2026 (UTC)

Cameron James Nii Adjei Ashia (born 22 April 2005) is an English professional footballer who plays as a midfielder for EFL League One club Huddersfield Town.

== Career ==
In July 2022, Ashia joined the Derby County academy after having impressed scouts at a Fox Soccer Academy Showcase event. He departed the club upon the expiration of his scholarship at the end of the 2022–23 season.

=== Huddersfield Town ===
In April 2024, Ashia joined Championship club Huddersfield Town, signing a one-year contract with the club's B team. On 3 September 2024, he made his senior debut in a 2–1 EFL Trophy defeat to Doncaster Rovers. In March 2025, he joined National League South club Torquay United on loan for the remainder of the season, however he did not feature for the club.

On 9 August 2025, Ashia made his league debut for the Terriers, scoring his side's second goal in a 2–0 victory over Reading.

== Career statistics ==
As of match played 8 November 2025

Appearances and goals by club, season and competition
Club	Season	League			FA Cup		League Cup		Other		Total	
Club	Season	Division	Apps	Goals	Apps	Goals	Apps	Goals	Apps	Goals	Apps	Goals
Huddersfield Town	2024–25	League One	0	0	0	0	0	0	1 (Note: Appearance(s) in EFL Trophy)	0	1	0
Huddersfield Town	2025–26	League One	5	2	1	0	3	1	3	0	12	3
Career total			5	2	1	0	3	1	4	0	13	3
