= Ruben Roosken =

Dutch footballer (born 2000)

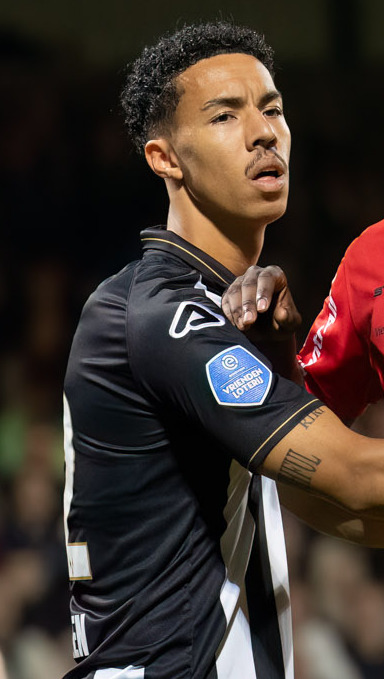

Personal information
- Full name: Ruben Eduardo Roosken
- Date of birth: 2 March 2000 (age 26)
- Place of birth: Klazienaveen, Drenthe,Netherlands
- Height: 1.83 m (6 ft 0 in)
- Position: Left-back

Team information
- Current team: Oxford United

Youth career
- VV Klazienaveen
- 2012–2019: Emmen

Senior career*
Years	Team	Apps	(Gls)
2019–2020	Emmen	3	(0)
2020–2021	TOP Oss	29	(0)
2021–2025	Heracles Almelo	83	(2)
2025–2026	Huddersfield Town	35	(4)
2026	→ Oxford United (loan)	3	(0)
2026–	Oxford United	0	(0)
- * Club domestic league appearances and goals as of 09:00, 21 July 2026 (UTC)

Ruben Eduardo Roosken (born 2 March 2000) is a Dutch professional footballer who plays as a left-back for English EFL League One side Oxford United.

== Club career ==
=== Emmen ===
Born in Klazienaveen, Drenthe to Dutch father and a Luso-Angolan mother, Roosken played as a youth for VV Klazienaveen before joining the youth academy of FC Emmen. He made his Eredivisie debut for Emmen on 14 September 2019 in a match against Utrecht.

=== TOP Oss ===
On 10 August 2020, Roosken signed a two-year contract with Eerste Divisie club, TOP Oss. He made his debut for the club on 29 August in a 1–2 home loss to Helmond Sport, coming on as a substitute in the 67th minute for Niels Fleuren. In the following match against Roda JC Kerkrade, Roosken made his first start for the club. Afterwards, he would become a regular starter for the club, making 30 total appearances for TOP Oss as the club finished in 10th place.

=== Heracles Almelo ===
On 18 June 2021, it was announced that Roosken had signed a three-year contract with Heracles Almelo.

=== Huddersfield Town ===
On 28 December 2024, Roosken agreed to join EFL League One club Huddersfield Town on a two-and-a-half year deal for an undisclosed fee, joining the club upon the opening of the transfer window on 1 January 2025. On 4 January 2025, he made his debut as a second-half substitute in a 0–0 draw with Rotherham United, being shown a straight red card just nine minutes after coming on. In the following season he went on to make 21 league appearances before his subsequent winter transfer window loan to Oxford United.

=== Oxford United ===
On 2 February 2026, Roosken joined EFL Championship side Oxford United on loan with a clause in the transfer to make it permanent.

== Career statistics ==
As of match played 4 February 2026

Appearances and goals by club, season and competition
Club	Season	League			National cup (Note: Includes KNVB Cup, FA Cup)		League cup (Note: Includes EFL Cup)		Other		Total	
Club	Season	Division	Apps	Goals	Apps	Goals	Apps	Goals	Apps	Goals	Apps	Goals
Emmen	2019-20	Eredivisie	3	0	0	0	—		—		3	0
TOP Oss	2020-21	Eerste Divisie	29	0	1	0	—		—		30	0
Heracles Almelo	2021-22	Eredivisie	7	0	1	0	—		1 (Note: Appearance(s) in Eredivisie promotion/relegation play-offs)	0	9	0
Heracles Almelo	2022-23	Eerste Divisie	37	1	1	0	—		—		38	1
Heracles Almelo	2023-24	Eredivisie	23	0	1	0	—		—		24	0
Heracles Almelo	2024-25	Eredivisie	16	0	2	0	—		—		18	1
Heracles Almelo	Total		83	1	5	0	—		1	0	89	2
Huddersfield Town	2024-25	League One	14	2	—		—		—		13	2
Huddersfield Town	2025-26	League One	21	1	1	0	1	0	3 (Note: Appearance(s) in EFL Trophy)	0	26	1
Huddersfield Town	Total		35	3	1	0	1	0	3	1	5	3
Oxford United (loan)	2025–26	Championship	0	0	0	0	0	0	0	0	0	0
Career total			136	4	6	0	1	0	4	1	94	5

== Honours ==
Heracles Almelo

- Eerste Divisie: 2022–23
