= Peter Thomas (footballer, born 2004) =

English footballer (born 2004)

Personal information
- Date of birth: 20 August 2004 (age 22)
- Place of birth: Gorton, England
- Height: 1.85 m (6 ft 1 in)
- Positions: Midfielder; forward

Team information
- Current team: Huddersfield Town

Youth career
- 2016–2019: Rochdale

College career
Years	Team	Apps	(Gls)
2023	Charleston Cougars	15	(7)

Senior career*
Years	Team	Apps	(Gls)
2019–2022	Rochdale	0	(0)
2024	Hyde United	0	(0)
2024–	Huddersfield Town	0	(0)
- * Club domestic league appearances and goals as of 17:10, 2 May 2025 (UTC)

Peter Thomas (born 20 August 2004) is an English professional footballer who plays as a forward for Huddersfield Town.

== Club career ==
=== Early career ===
Thomas became Rochdale's youngest ever player when he made his debut in the EFL Trophy against Manchester City U21, as well as being the youngest player ever to play in the competition, at the age of 15 years and 22 days old.

On 25 September 2019, ahead of the EFL Cup game between Manchester United and Rochdale at Old Trafford, in which Thomas was named on the bench for Rochdale, he was made to use the drug testing room to get changed, as competition rules stated that anyone under the age of sixteen were not permitted to get changed with senior players.

In May 2022, after two seasons with no further appearances for Rochdale, it was reported that he was still negotiating his contract with the club. In August of the same year, he went on trial with Barnsley.

=== Collegiate soccer ===
Thomas committed to playing collegiate soccer at the College of Charleston in November 2022. In his first and only season at the college, he scored seven goals in fifteen appearances.

=== Return to England ===
On his return to England, Thomas briefly featured for Northern Premier League side Hyde United, playing one game in the Cheshire Senior Cup.

== Career statistics ==
As of 21 February 2023.

Appearances and goals by club, season and competition
Club	Season	League			FA Cup		EFL Cup		Other		Total	
Club	Season	Division	Apps	Goals	Apps	Goals	Apps	Goals	Apps	Goals	Apps	Goals
Rochdale	2019–20	League One	0	0	0	0	0	0	1 (Note: Appearances in the EFL Trophy)	0	1	0
Rochdale	2020–21	League One	0	0	0	0	0	0	0	0	0	0
Rochdale	2021–22	League Two	0	0	0	0	0	0	0	0	0	0
Rochdale	Total		0	0	0	0	0	0	1	0	1	0
Hyde United	2023–24	Northern Premier League	0	0	0	0	0	0	1 (Note: Appearances in the Cheshire Senior Cup)	0	1	0
Huddersfield Town	2024–25	League One	0	0	0	0	0	0	1	0	1	0
Career total			0	0	0	0	0	0	3	0	3	0
