= Cameron Humphreys (footballer, born 2003) =

English footballer

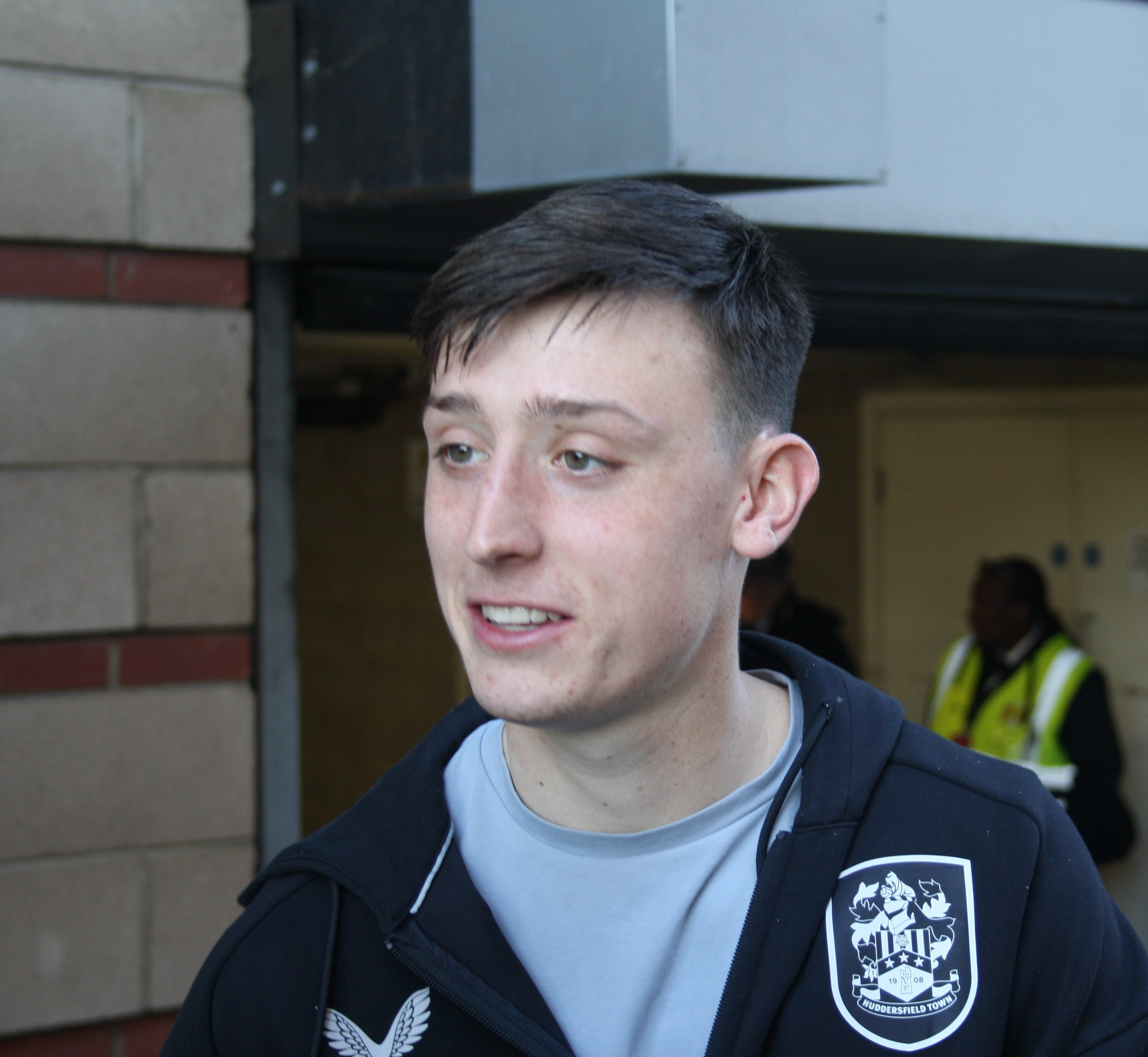
- Humphreys in 2026

Personal information
- Date of birth: 30 October 2003 (age 23)
- Place of birth: Colchester, England
- Positions: Midfielder; left-back

Team information
- Current team: Ipswich Town
- Number: 30

Youth career
- Ipswich Town

Senior career*
Years	Team	Apps	(Gls)
2021–	Ipswich Town	25	(2)
2024–2025	→ Wycombe Wanderers (loan)	42	(7)
2026	→ Huddersfield Town (loan)	18	(2)
- * Club domestic league appearances and goals as of 15 April 2026 (UTC)

Cameron Humphreys (born 30 October 2003) is an English professional footballer who plays as a midfielder for EFL League One club Huddersfield Town, on loan from Ipswich Town.

Humphreys, a product of the Ipswich Town Academy, made his first-team debut for the club in 2021. He has since made 22 appearances and scored two goals for Ipswich Town. In August 2024, he joined Wycombe Wanderers on loan for the remainder of the season to gain more first-team experience.

== Career ==
Humphreys signed as a full-time scholar with Ipswich Town in June 2020. He signed his first professional contract with Ipswich in June 2021, signing a two-year deal with the option of an additional one-year extension. He made his senior debut on 10 August 2021, starting in a 0–1 EFL Cup defeat to Newport County.

Humphreys was part of the U18 Professional Development League Cup winning squad for Ipswich Town, winning 7–0 against Coventry City in April 2022, registering three assists.

He made his league debut as a second-half substitute in a 0–2 away defeat against Charlton Athletic on 7 December. His second league appearance came in the final match of the season, also against Charlton Athletic, coming on as a second-half substitute and providing an assist for the final goal as Ipswich won 4–0. Humphreys won Ipswich's Young Player of the Year award for the 2021–22 season. On 8 June 2022, Humphreys signed a new three-year contract with Ipswich until 2025.

On 8 January 2026, Humphreys returned to League One, joining Huddersfield Town on loan for the remainder of the 2025–26 season. He registered 2 goals and 2 assists across 18 appearances.

On 1 September 2026, Humphreys returned to Huddersfield on loan after spending the pre-season with Ipswich, during which he registered an assist in their Carabao Cup 2nd-round match.

== Career statistics ==
As of match played 29 December 2025

Appearances and goals by club, season and competition
Club	Season	League			FA Cup		EFL Cup		Other		Total	
Club	Season	Division	Apps	Goals	Apps	Goals	Apps	Goals	Apps	Goals	Apps	Goals
Ipswich Town	2021–22	League One	2	0	1	0	1	0	0	0	4	0
Ipswich Town	2022–23	League One	17	2	4	1	1	0	4 (Note: Appearances in EFL Trophy)	0	26	3
Ipswich Town	2023–24	Championship	3	0	2	0	4	1	—		9	1
Ipswich Town	2025–26	Championship	3	0	0	0	1	0	—		4	0
Ipswich Town	Total		25	2	7	1	7	1	4	0	43	4
Wycombe Wanderers (loan)	2024–25	League One	42	7	1	0	2	0	3	0	48	7
Career total			67	9	8	1	9	1	7	0	91	11

== Honours ==
Ipswich Town

- EFL League One runner-up: 2022–23
- EFL Championship runner-up: 2023–24

Individual

- Ipswich Town Academy Player of the Year: 2021–22
- Ipswich Town Young Player of the Year: 2021–22
- Wycombe Wanderers Young Player of the Year: 2024–25
- Wycombe Wanderers Player of the Year: 2024–25
