= Radinio Balker =

Surinamese footballer (born 1998)

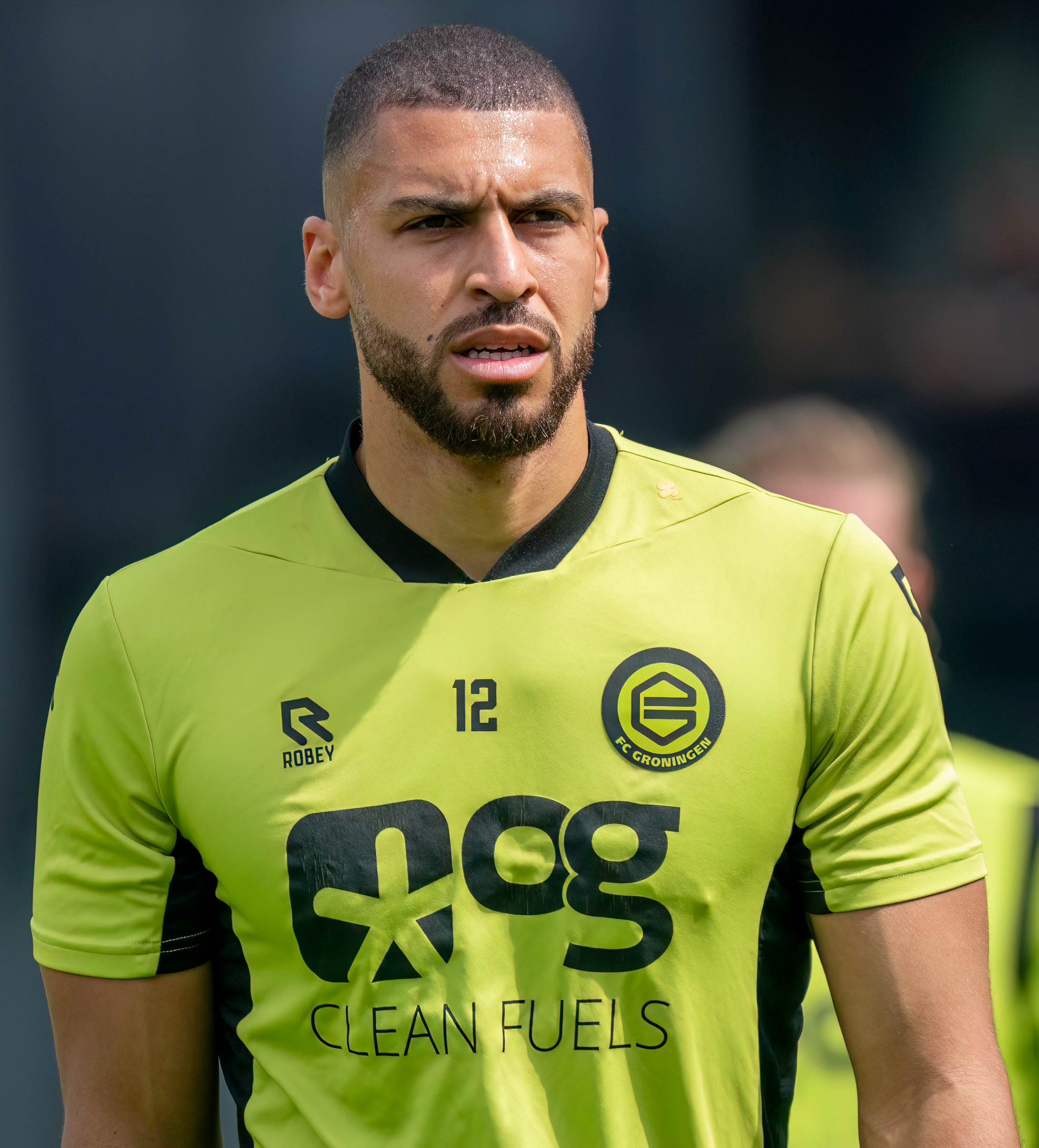

Personal information
- Full name: Radinio Roberto Balker
- Date of birth: 3 September 1998 (age 28)
- Place of birth: Amsterdam, Netherlands
- Height: 1.90 m (6 ft 3 in)
- Position: Centre-back

Team information
- Current team: Huddersfield Town
- Number: 12

Youth career
- ASC Waterwijk
- 2008–2011: Zeeburgia
- 2011–2017: Almere City
- 2015: Bénodet UK (loan)

Senior career*
Years	Team	Apps	(Gls)
2018–2020	Jong Almere City	39	(4)
2018–2021	Almere City	59	(3)
2021–2024	Groningen	50	(4)
2024–	Huddersfield Town	46	(1)

International career^{‡}
2025–	Suriname	5	(1)
- * Club domestic league appearances and goals as of 15 April 2026 (UTC) ‡ National team caps and goals as of 7:40, 1 February 2026 (UTC)

Radinio Roberto Balker (born 3 September 1998) is a professional footballer who plays as a centre-back for EFL League One club Huddersfield Town. Born in the Netherlands, he represents the Suriname national team.

== Club career ==
He made his Eerste Divisie debut for Almere City on 14 December 2018 in a game against Jong Ajax, as a starter.

On 20 January 2021, Balker agreed to sign for Eredivisie club Groningen on a three-year contract starting 1 July, with an option for an additional year. He suffered a serious injury during practice on 2 July 2021, sidelining him for months.

On 18 January 2024, Balker signed a contract with EFL Championship club Huddersfield Town until June 2027.

On 16 July 2026, Balker signed a one-year contract extension to remain with Huddersfield Town until 2028

== Career statistics ==
As of match played 3 February 2024

Appearances and goals by club, season and competition
Club	Season	League			National Cup		League Cup		Other		Total	
Club	Season	Division	Apps	Goals	Apps	Goals	Apps	Goals	Apps	Goals	Apps	Goals
Jong Almere City	2017–18	Derde Divisie	20	1	—		—		4 (Note: Appearances in Derde Divisie promotion play-offs)	0	24	1
Jong Almere City	2018–19	Tweede Divisie	12	2	—		—		—		12	2
Jong Almere City			32	3	—		—		4	0	36	3
Almere City	2018–19	Eerste Divisie	19	0	0	0	—		—		19	0
Almere City	2019–20	Eerste Divisie	22	1	0	0	—		—		22	1
Almere City	2020–21	Eerste Divisie	15	2	0	0	—		1 (Note: Appearance in Eerste Divisie promotion play-off)	0	16	2
Almere City	Total		56	3	0	0	—		1	0	57	3
Groningen	2021–22	Eredivisie	0	0	0	0	—		—		0	0
Groningen	2022–23	Eredivisie	31	1	2	0	—		—		33	1
Groningen	2023–24	Eerste Divisie	19	3	1	0	—		—		20	3
Groningen	Total		50	4	3	0	—		—		53	4
Huddersfield Town	2023–24	Championship	2	0	0	0	0	0	—		2	0
Career total			140	10	3	0	0	0	5	0	148	10

=== International ===
As of match played 6 November 2025

National team	Year	Apps	Goals
Suriname	2025	3	1
Total		2	1

Scores and results list Suriname's goal tally first.

No.	Date	Venue	Opponent	Score	Result	Competition
1.	9 September 2025	Cuscatlán Stadium, San Salvador, El Salvador	El Salvador	1–0	2–1	2026 FIFA World Cup qualification
