= 2026–27 Peterborough United F.C. season =

93rd season in existence of Peterborough United FC

Peterborough United
2026–27 season
- Owner: Darragh MacAnthony (75%), Gary Graham & Greg Barr (20%), IRC Investments Limited (5%)
- Chairman: Darragh MacAnthony
- Manager: Robbie Savage (from 2 October); Ryan Harley (caretaker); Luke Williams (until 19 September)
- Stadium: Weston Homes Stadium
- Top goalscorer: League: Harry Leonard (4 Goals); All: Harry Leonard (10 Goals)
Home colours	Away colours	Third colours

The 2026–27 season is the 93rd season in the history of Peterborough United Football Club, and their fifth consecutive season in League One. In addition to the domestic league, the club would also participate in the FA Cup, the EFL Cup, and the EFL Trophy.

== Managerial changes ==
On 19 September, Luke Williams was dismissed of his duties as manager following the 2–0 home defeat against Doncaster Rovers, leaving The Posh 23rd after seven matches. Ryan Harley was put in interim charge until a permanent appointment made. Thirteen days later, Robbie Savage joins as manager from Forest Green Rovers on a long-term contract.

== Transfers and contracts ==
=== In ===
Date	Pos.	Player	From	Fee	Ref.
18 June 2026	AM	(England) Harrison Jones	(England) Sunderland	Undisclosed	
25 June 2026	GK	(Italy) Collin Andeng-Ndi	(England) Southend United	Undisclosed	
30 June 2026	CB	(Republic of Ireland) Tom O'Connor	(Wales) Wrexham	Free	
1 July 2026 (Note: The transfer was announced on 30 June, and would become official on July 1 once Edwards' contract at Colchester United expired.)	LW	(England) Owura Edwards	(England) Colchester United	Free	
1 July 2026 (Note: The transfer was announced on 11 June, and would become official on July 1 once Weir's contract at Walsall expired.)	LB	(Republic of Ireland) Evan Weir	(England) Walsall	Free	
13 August 2026	LW	(England) Ethan Williams	(England) Manchester United	Undisclosed	
13 August 2026	CF	(Zimbabwe) Vernon Masara	(England) Burnley	Undisclosed	
13 August 2026	CM	(Republic of Ireland) Liam Kelly	(England) Milton Keynes Dons	Undisclosed	
26 August 2026	CF	(England) Danny Ormerod	(England) AFC Fylde	Undisclosed	
1 September 2026	AM	(Wales) Harry Ashfield	(Wales) Wrexham	Undisclosed	

=== Out ===
Date	Pos.	Player	To	Fee	Ref.
2 July 2026	RW	(Republic of Ireland) Cian Hayes	(England) Rochdale	Undisclosed	
2 July 2026	LW	(England) Abraham Odoh	(England) Salford City	Undisclosed	
26 July 2026	LW	(England) Kyrell Lisbie	(England) Millwall	Undisclosed	

=== Loaned in ===
Date	Pos.	Player	From	Loaned until	Ref.
31 August 2026	CB	(Scotland) Josh Feeney	(England) Aston Villa	30 June 2027	

=== Loaned out ===
Date	Pos.	Player	To	Loaned until	Ref.
9 July 2026	CF	(England) Bradley Ihionvien	(England) Colchester United	30 June 2027	
10 July 2026	CF	(England) Pemi Aderoju	(England) Crawley Town	30 June 2027	
14 August 2026	CM	(Wales) Joe Andrews	(England) Chesham United	14 September 2026	
1 September 2026	CF	(England) David Kamara	(England) Tranmere Rovers	30 June 2027	
1 September 2026	AM	(Greece) Klaidi Lolos	(England) Rotherham United	30 June 2027	
1 September 2026	CB	(Wales) George Nevett	(England) Tranmere Rovers	30 June 2027	

=== Released / Out of Contract ===
Date	Pos.	Player	Subsequent club	Joined date	Ref.
30 June 2026	CB	(Albania) Milan Kovaci	(Albania) FK Vora	2 July 2026	
30 June 2026	LB	(The Gambia) Jacob Mendy	(England) Bromley	10 July 2026	
30 June 2026	LW	(Wales) Joe Davies	(Wales) Swansea City	15 July 2026	
30 June 2026	GK	(England) Ben Westcott	(England) AFC Bournemouth	25 July 2026	
30 June 2026	CB	(England) Tom Lees	(England) Harrogate Town	30 July 2026	
30 June 2026	DM	(England) Archie Collins	(England) Huddersfield Town	13 August 2026	
30 June 2026	CB	(England) Nathan Aikins			
30 June 2026	LW	(England) Andre Changunda			
30 June 2026	LW	(England) Rylie Fitzpatrick			

=== New Contract ===
Date	Pos.	Player	Contract expiry	Ref.
1 July 2026 (Note: The contract agreement was announced on 29 May, and would commence on July 1.)	CB	(England) Fabian Claxton	30 June 2027 (Note: Includes an additional one-year option)	
2 July 2026	RW	(England) Benji McWilliams-Marcano	30 June 2027	
3 July 2026	GK	(England) Bastian Smith	30 June 2027	
30 July 2026	CAM	(Ukraine) Patryk Sykut	Undisclosed	
24 September 2026	CB	(England) Olly Arber	Undisclosed (Note: First professional contract)	
16 November 2026	RW	(England) Bolu Shofowoke	30 June 2029	

== Pre-season and friendlies ==
On 1 June, Posh announced a pre-season friendly against West Bromwich Albion. A day later, a trip to face Colchester United was confirmed. A third opponent was then added in Boston United. On 8 June, a trip to York City was announced. Four days later, a short trip to face Peterborough Sports was added. On 25 June a friendly against Saudi Pro League side Neom SC was announced to be played in Spain.

Win Draw Loss Fixtures

14 July 2026 Friendly	Peterborough United	2–1	FC Magpies	La Cala de Mijas, Spain
18:00 CEST (17:00 BST)	Shofowoke 53'; Conn-Clarke 79'	Report	81'	Stadium: La Cala Sports Resort; Attendance: 0 (Behind closed doors)

17 July 2026 Friendly	Neom SC	0–0	Peterborough United	Marbella, Spain
19:00 CEST (18:00 BST)	Koné (yellow card) 24'	Report		Stadium: Banus Football Center

21 July 2026 Friendly	Colchester United	2–3	Peterborough United	Colchester
19:45 BST	Payne 31'; Oni 81'	Report	Edwards 8'; Leonard 75' (pen.); Khela 87'	Stadium: JobServe Community Stadium; Attendance: 1,062; Referee: Tim Robinson

22 July 2026 Friendly	Peterborough Sports	0–1	Peterborough United	Peterborough
19:45 BST	Keeble (yellow card) 45'		Kamara 47'; Smith (yellow card) 61'	Stadium: PIMS Park

25 July 2026 Friendly	Boston United	1–0	Peterborough United	Wyberton
15:00 BST	Cursons 74'	Report		Stadium: Jakemans Community Stadium; Attendance: 1,435; Referee: Declan Bourne

28 July 2026 Friendly	York City	1–2	Peterborough United	Huntington
19:30 BST	Newby 51'		Khela 24'; Dornelly 79'	Stadium: LNER Community Stadium; Attendance: 2,324; Referee: Garreth Rhodes

1 August 2026 Friendly	Peterborough United	0–2	West Bromwich Albion	Peterborough
15:00 BST		Report	Molumby (yellow card) 18'; Heggebø 48'; Stewart 72'	Stadium: Weston Homes Stadium; Attendance: 3,444

== Competitions ==
=== League One ===
==== League table ====
Pos	Team	Pld	W	D	L	GF	GA	GD	Pts	Promotion, qualification or relegation
19	Notts County	13	3	5	5	13	15	−2	14	
20	Doncaster Rovers	14	3	4	7	16	24	−8	13	
21	Peterborough United	14	3	4	7	13	23	−10	13	Relegation to EFL League Two
22	Blackpool	14	3	3	8	18	24	−6	12	Relegation to EFL League Two
23	Bromley	14	3	3	8	14	33	−19	12	Relegation to EFL League Two

Updated to match(es) played on 21 November 2026. Source: EFL Official Website
Rules for classification: 1) Points; 2) Goal difference; 3) Number of goals scored; 4) Head-to-head results; 5) Wins; 6) Away goals; 7) Penalty points (sec 9.5); 8) 12-point sending off offences

==== Results summary ====
Overall								Home						Away					
Pld	W	D	L	GF	GA	GD	Pts	W	D	L	GF	GA	GD	W	D	L	GF	GA	GD
14	3	4	7	13	23	−10	13	1	2	3	5	9	−4	2	2	4	8	14	−6

Last updated: 21 November 2026.
Source: Soccerway

==== Results by round ====
Round	1	2	3	4	5	6	7	8	10	11	12	13	14	16	17	18	15^{2}	19	9^{1}	20	21	22	23	24	25	26	27	28	29	30	31	32	33
Ground	A	H	A	H	H	A	H	A	A	H	A	A	H	A	H	A	H	H	H	A	H	A	A	H	A	H	H	A	H	A	A	H	A
Result	L	W	L	D	L	D	L	L	W	D	L	D	L	W																			
Position	23	13	17	17	20	21	23	23	20	19	21	21	22	21																			

Source: EFL
A = Away; H = Home; W = Win; D = Draw; L = Loss; P = Postponed
Notes:
- ^{1} Matchday 9 (vs. Notts County) was postponed due to international call-ups.v
- ^{1} Matchday 15 (vs. Oxford United) was postponed due to international call-ups.

==== Matches ====
On 25 June, the League One fixtures were revealed.

Win Draw Loss Fixtures

15 August 2026 1	Bradford City	2–0	Peterborough United	Bradford
15:00 BST	Jackson (yellow card) 45+1'; Gillesphey 54'; Powell 75'; Phillips (yellow card) 76'	Report	Okagbue (yellow card) 22' (yellow-red card) 85'; Weir (yellow card) 66'	Stadium: Mbanq Valley Parade; Attendance: 19,871; Referee: Tony Harrington

22 August 2026 2	Peterborough United	2–1	Mansfield Town	Peterborough
15:00 BST	Woods 50'; Khela (yellow card) 54'; Johnston (yellow card) 66'; Leonard 90+3'	Report	Smith 60'; Oates (yellow card) 79'; Sweeney (yellow card) 89'	Stadium: Weston Homes Stadium; Attendance: 8,900; Referee: Martin Woods

29 August 2026 3	Blackpool	4–0	Peterborough United	Blackpool
12:30 BST	Williams 19'; Charles 20'; Anderson 56'; Yates 72'	Report		Stadium: Bloomfield Road; Attendance: 9,327; Referee: Martin Coy
Note: Fixture was initially scheduled for a 15:00 kick-off, but was brought forward for live Sky Sports broadcasting.

1 September 2026 4	Peterborough United	0–0	Stevenage	Peterborough
19:45 BST	Feeney (yellow card) 76'		James-Wildin (yellow card) 62'	Stadium: Weston Homes Stadium; Attendance: 6,565; Referee: Darren Drysdale

5 September 2026 5	Peterborough United	1–2	Sheffield Wednesday	Peterborough
12:30 BST	Williams (yellow card) 43'; Woods 47'; Khela (yellow card) 78'	Report	Feeney 38' (o.g.); Heskey (yellow card) 57'; Slattery (yellow card) 62'; Valery 79'; Morrison (yellow card) 90+6'	Stadium: Weston Homes Stadium; Attendance: 10,848; Referee: Andrew Humphries
Note: Fixture was initially scheduled for a 15:00 kick-off, but was brought forward for live Sky Sports broadcasting.

12 September 2026 6	Milton Keynes Dons	1–1	Peterborough United	Denbigh
15:00 BST	Collins 29'; Bramall (yellow card) 80'; Gilbey (yellow card) 86'	Report	Conn-Clarke 85'	Stadium: Stadium MK; Attendance: 10,006; Referee: Scott Oldham

19 September 2026 7	Peterborough United	0–2	Doncaster Rovers	Peterborough
15:00 BST	Feeney (yellow card) 36'; Leonard (yellow card) 90+2'		May 15'; Hutchinson 88'; Senior (yellow card) 90+2'	Stadium: Weston Homes Stadium; Attendance: 7,835; Referee: William Davis

26 September 2026 8	Stockport County	1–0	Peterborough United	Edgeley
15:00 BST	Wootton 51'; Adigun (yellow card) 90+1'	Report	Johnston (yellow card) 46'; Mendonca (yellow card) 87'; Mills (yellow card) 89'	Stadium: Edgeley Park; Attendance: 9,637; Referee: Ross Martin

10 October 2026 10	Leicester City	1–3	Peterborough United	Leicester
15:00 BST	Riis 68'	Report	Edwards 15'; Leonard 36'; O'Hora 44' (o.g.); Garbett (yellow card) 85'	Stadium: King Power Stadium; Attendance: 29,839; Referee: Simon Hooper

17 October 2026 11	Peterborough United	2–2	Burton Albion	Peterborough
12:30 BST	Edwards 2'; Johnston (yellow card) 77'; Khela (yellow card) 79'; Garbett 90+6'	Report	Webster 30'; Raphael (yellow card) 78'; Arubi 89'	Stadium: Weston Homes Stadium; Attendance: 7,984; Referee: Craig Hicks
Note: Fixture was initially scheduled for a 15:00 kick off but was brought forward for broadcasting by Sky Sports.

20 October 2026 12	Huddersfield Town	4–1	Peterborough United	Huddersfield
19:45 BST	Bronkhorst 3', (yellow card) 6'; Taylor 66', 70', (yellow card) 77'; Mumba 79'	Report	Mendonça (yellow card) 9'; Kelly (yellow card) 47'; Leonard 68'	Stadium: Accu Stadium; Referee: Simon Mather

24 October 2026 13	Bromley	1–1	Peterborough United	Bromley
15:00 BST	Cheek 10'; Grant (yellow card) 84'	Report	Masara 90+3'	Stadium: Copperjax Community Stadium; Attendance: 4,880; Referee: Edward Duckworth

31 October 2026 14	Peterborough United	0–2	Luton Town	Peterborough
15:00 GMT	Ashfield (yellow card) 9'	Report	Clark 3'; Donley (yellow card) 43'; Kelly 46' (o.g.); Palmer (yellow card) 76'	Stadium: Weston Homes Stadium; Attendance: 8,814; Referee: Lewis Sandoe

21 November 2026 16	Plymouth Argyle	0–2	Peterborough United	Plymouth
15:00 GMT	White (yellow card) 45+1'; McKenzie (yellow card) 70'; Evans (yellow card) 88'; Cooper (yellow card) 90+1'		Ashfield 22' (yellow card) 81'; Mills (yellow card) 48'; Feeney (yellow card) 59'; Leonard 90+2' (pen.)	Stadium: Home Park; Attendance: 15,061; Referee: Carl Brook

28 November 2026 17	Peterborough United	v	Cambridge United	Peterborough
12:30 GMT				Stadium: Weston Homes Stadium
Note: Fixture was initially scheduled for a 15:00 kick off but was brought forward for broadcasting by Sky Sports.

1 December 2026 18	Leyton Orient	v	Peterborough United	Leyton
19:45 GMT				Stadium: BetWright Stadium

5 December 2026 15	Peterborough United	v	Oxford United	Peterborough
15:00 GMT				Stadium: Weston Homes Stadium
Note: Fixture was initially scheduled for 14 November, but was re-arranged due to international call-ups.

12 December 2026 19	Peterborough United	v	Barnsley	Peterborough
15:00 GMT				Stadium: Weston Homes Stadium

15 December 2026 9	Peterborough United	v	Notts County	Peterborough
19:45 GMT				Stadium: Weston Homes Stadium
Note: Fixture was originally scheduled for 3 October, but was postponed due to international call-ups within the opposition squad. It was later re-arranged for 15 December.

19 December 2026 20	Wigan Athletic	v	Peterborough United	Wigan
15:00 GMT				Stadium: The Brick Community Stadium

26 December 2026 21	Peterborough United	v	Wycombe Wanderers	Peterborough
15:00 GMT				Stadium: Weston Homes Stadium

29 December 2026 22	Reading	v	Peterborough United	Reading
19:45 GMT				Stadium: Select Car Leasing Stadium

1 January 2027 23	AFC Wimbledon	v	Peterborough United	Wimbledon
15:00 GMT				Stadium: The Cherry Red Records Stadium

9 January 2027 24	Peterborough United	v	Wigan Athletic	Peterborough
15:00 GMT				Stadium: Weston Homes Stadium

16 January 2027 25	Burton Albion	v	Peterborough United	Burton upon Trent
15:00 GMT				Stadium: Pirelli Stadium

19 January 2027 26	Peterborough United	v	Huddersfield Town	Peterborough
19:45 GMT				Stadium: Weston Homes Stadium

23 January 2027 27	Peterborough United	v	Bromley	Peterborough
15:00 GMT				Stadium: Weston Homes Stadium

30 January 2027 28	Luton Town	v	Peterborough United	Luton
12:30 GMT				Stadium: Kenilworth Road
Note: Fixture was initially scheduled for a 15:00 kick-off, but was brought forward for live Sky Sports broadcasting.

6 February 2027 29	Peterborough United	v	Blackpool	Peterborough
15:00 GMT				Stadium: Weston Homes Stadium

9 February 2027 30	Stevenage	v	Peterborough United	Stevenage
19:45 GMT				Stadium: Stevenage FC Stadium

13 February 2027 31	Sheffield Wednesday	v	Peterborough United	Owlerton
15:00 GMT				Stadium: Hillsborough

20 February 2027 32	Peterborough United	v	Milton Keynes Dons	Peterborough
15:00 GMT				Stadium: Weston Homes Stadium

27 February 2027 33	Cambridge United	v	Peterborough United	Cambridge
12:30 GMT				Stadium: Cledara Abbey Stadium
Note: Fixture was initially scheduled for a 15:00 kick-off, but was brought forward.

=== FA Cup ===
Peterborough were drawn at home to Reading in the first round.

Win Draw Loss Fixtures

7 November 2026 First round	Peterborough United	0–5	Reading	Peterborough
20:00 GMT	Williams (yellow card) 9'; Mills (yellow card) 52'; Khela (yellow card) 66'; Kelly (yellow card) 85'	Report	Kyerewaa (yellow card) 23', (goal) 26'; Marriott 34'; Savage 45+4'; Ahmed (yellow card) 59'; Reid 72', 76'	Stadium: Weston Homes Stadium; Attendance: 4,003 (361 Reading fans); Referee: Dean Whitestone
Note: Fixture was selected for live TNT Sports broadcasting.

=== EFL Cup ===
Peterborough were drawn away to Bristol Rovers in the first round, to Watford in the second round, home to Barnsley in round three and away to Bradford City in the fourth round.

Win Draw Loss Fixtures

8 August 2026 First Round	Bristol Rovers	0–1	Peterborough United	Bristol
15:00 BST	Forde (yellow card) 22'	Report	Dornelly (yellow card) 13'; Leonard 19' (pen.), (yellow card) 31'; Jones (yellow card) 29'	Stadium: Memorial Stadium; Attendance: 4,810; Referee: David Rock

25 August 2026 Second Round	Watford	1–5	Peterborough United	Watford
19:45 BST	Doumbia 73'	Report	Clarridge 10' (o.g.); Leonard 23' 51'; Shofowoke 55'; Jones 64'; Nevett (yellow card) 83'	Stadium: Vicarage Road; Attendance: 7,978; Referee: Isaac Searle

15 September 2026 Third round	Peterborough United	3–3 (7–6 p)	Barnsley	Peterborough
19:30 BST	Leonard 19', (yellow card) 76'; Ormerod 27' 88'; Edwards (yellow card) 68'; Mendonça (yellow card) 90+4'	Report	McGeehan 1', (yellow card) 61'; O'Riordan (yellow card) 26'; Cleary 40', 74'; Richards (yellow card) 51'	Stadium: Weston Homes Stadium; Attendance: 3,105; Referee: Thomas Parsons
	Penalties
	Leonard (penalty scored); Ormerod (penalty scored); Conn-Clarke (penalty scored); Mills (penalty scored); Kelly (penalty scored); Feeney (penalty scored); Jones (penalty scored)		(penalty scored) Connell; (penalty scored) Kelly; (penalty scored) Noslin; (penalty scored) Kay; (penalty scored) Cleary; (penalty scored) Gale; (penalty missed) Alker

27 October 2026 Fourth round	Bradford City	2–0	Peterborough United	Bradford
19:45 GMT	Gillesphey (yellow card) 5', (goal) 13'; Welch (yellow card) 20'; Lapslie (yellow card) 28'; Pointon (yellow card) 31'; Connolly (yellow card) 34'; Phillips 67'; Morgan (yellow card) 86'	Report	Mendonça (yellow card) 59'; Mills (yellow card) 73'	Stadium: Mbanq Valley Parade; Attendance: 14,732; Referee: Thomas Kirk

=== EFL Trophy ===
==== Group stage ====
Peterborough were drawn against Colchester United, Luton Town and Ipswich Town U21 in Southern Group D.

Pos	Div	Team	Pld	W	PW	PL	L	GF	GA	GD	Pts	Qualification
1	L1	Luton Town	3	2	1	0	0	10	1	+9	8	Advance to Round 2
2	L1	Peterborough United	3	2	0	0	1	7	5	+2	6	Advance to Round 2
3	L2	Colchester United	3	0	1	1	1	2	4	−2	3	
4	ACA	Ipswich Town U21	3	0	0	1	2	1	10	−9	1	

Source: EFL

Win Draw Loss Fixtures

22 September 2026 South Group D	Peterborough United	3–1	Colchester United	Peterborough
19:00 BST	Edwards 28'; Ashfield 31' 42'; Mendonça (yellow card) 66'		Akande (yellow card) 53'; Harvey (yellow card) 75' (goal) 79'	Stadium: Weston Homes Stadium; Attendance: 1,853; Referee: Sam Mulhall

6 October 2026 South Group D	Peterborough United	4–1	Ipswich Town U21	Peterborough
19:00 BST	Leonard 26' (pen.) 31'; Ashfield 31'; Williams 35'; Mills (yellow card) 64'; Khela (yellow card) 72'; Mendonça (yellow card) 90+6'		Fletcher 51'; Mthunzi (yellow card) 80'	Stadium: Weston Homes Stadium; Attendance: 1,997

17 November 2026 South Group D	Luton Town	3–0	Peterborough United	Luton
19:00 BST	Richards (yellow card) 10'; Clark 16'; Wells 45+7'; Cole 62'	Report	Feeney (yellow card) 31'; Williams (yellow card) 45+7'; Bass (yellow card) 58'; Jones (yellow card) 67'	Stadium: Kenilworth Road; Attendance: 2,858 (298 Posh fans); Referee: Niall Smith

== Statistics ==
=== Appearances and goals ===
As of match played 17 November 2026

Players with no appearances are not included on the list; italics indicate loaned in player

No.	Pos	Nat	Player	Total		League One		FA Cup		EFL Cup		EFL Trophy	
No.	Pos	Nat	Player	Apps	Goals	Apps	Goals	Apps	Goals	Apps	Goals	Apps	Goals
1	GK	(England) ENG	Alex Bass	21	0	13+0	0	1+0	0	4+0	0	3+0	0
2	DF	(Northern Ireland) NIR	Carl Johnston	15	0	10+0	0	0+0	0	2+1	0	2+0	0
3	DF	(Republic of Ireland) IRL	Evan Weir	7	0	2+1	0	0+0	0	0+1	0	2+1	0
4	MF	(Republic of Ireland) IRL	Liam Kelly	19	0	12+1	0	0+1	0	1+1	0	3+0	0
5	DF	(England) ENG	Sam Hughes	3	0	0+1	0	1+0	0	0+0	0	1+0	0
6	DF	(Republic of Ireland) IRL	Thomas O'Connor	9	0	6+0	0	1+0	0	1+0	0	1+0	0
7	MF	(England) ENG	Harrison Jones	14	1	5+3	0	0+0	0	2+2	1	0+2	0
8	MF	(England) ENG	Brandon Khela	17	0	5+6	0	1+0	0	3+0	0	0+2	0
9	FW	(England) ENG	Harry Leonard	19	9	13+0	3	1+0	0	3+0	4	2+0	2
10	FW	(England) ENG	Ethan Williams	19	1	9+3	0	1+0	0	2+1	0	2+1	1
11	FW	(England) ENG	Owura Edwards	16	3	10+0	2	0+0	0	3+0	0	3+0	1
12	DF	(Scotland) SCO	Josh Feeney	13	0	8+0	0	0+1	0	2+0	0	1+1	0
14	DF	(England) ENG	Harley Mills	19	0	11+1	0	1+0	0	4+0	0	2+0	0
15	DF	(Wales) WAL	George Nevett	2	0	1+0	0	0+0	0	1+0	0	0+0	0
16	MF	(England) ENG	Ben Woods	11	2	5+3	2	0+0	0	1+1	0	1+0	0
17	FW	(Zimbabwe) ZIM	Vernon Masara	10	1	2+5	1	0+1	0	2+0	0	0+0	0
18	DF	(Brazil) BRA	Lucca Mendonca	13	0	6+0	0	1+0	0	2+2	0	2+0	0
19	FW	(England) ENG	Bolu Shofowoke	21	1	10+3	0	1+0	0	2+2	1	3+0	0
20	MF	(England) ENG	Chris Conn-Clarke	11	1	0+6	1	0+0	0	0+3	0	1+1	0
24	FW	(England) ENG	Declan Frith	4	0	0+2	0	0+0	0	0+1	0	0+1	0
26	DF	(Republic of Ireland) IRL	David Okagbue	9	0	5+1	0	0+0	0	3+0	0	0+0	0
27	FW	(England) ENG	Danny Ormerod	16	2	1+10	0	0+1	0	2+0	2	0+2	0
28	MF	(New Zealand) NZL	Matthew Garbett	7	1	0+4	1	1+0	0	0+1	0	0+1	0
29	FW	(England) ENG	David Kamara	2	0	0+0	0	0+0	0	0+2	0	0+0	0
33	DF	(England) ENG	James Dornelly	11	0	4+2	0	0+1	0	2+1	0	1+0	0
35	MF	(England) ENG	Eddie Fox	1	0	0+0	0	0+0	0	0+0	0	0+1	0
39	DF	(England) ENG	Nathaniel Joseph	1	0	0+0	0	0+0	0	0+0	0	0+1	0
40	FW	(Jamaica) JAM	Kurtis Simmons	1	0	0+0	0	0+0	0	0+0	0	0+1	0
45	MF	(Wales) WAL	Harry Ashfield	15	3	5+4	0	1+0	0	2+0	0	3+0	3
