= 2026–27 EFL Cup =

67th season of the EFL Cup

Carabao Cup
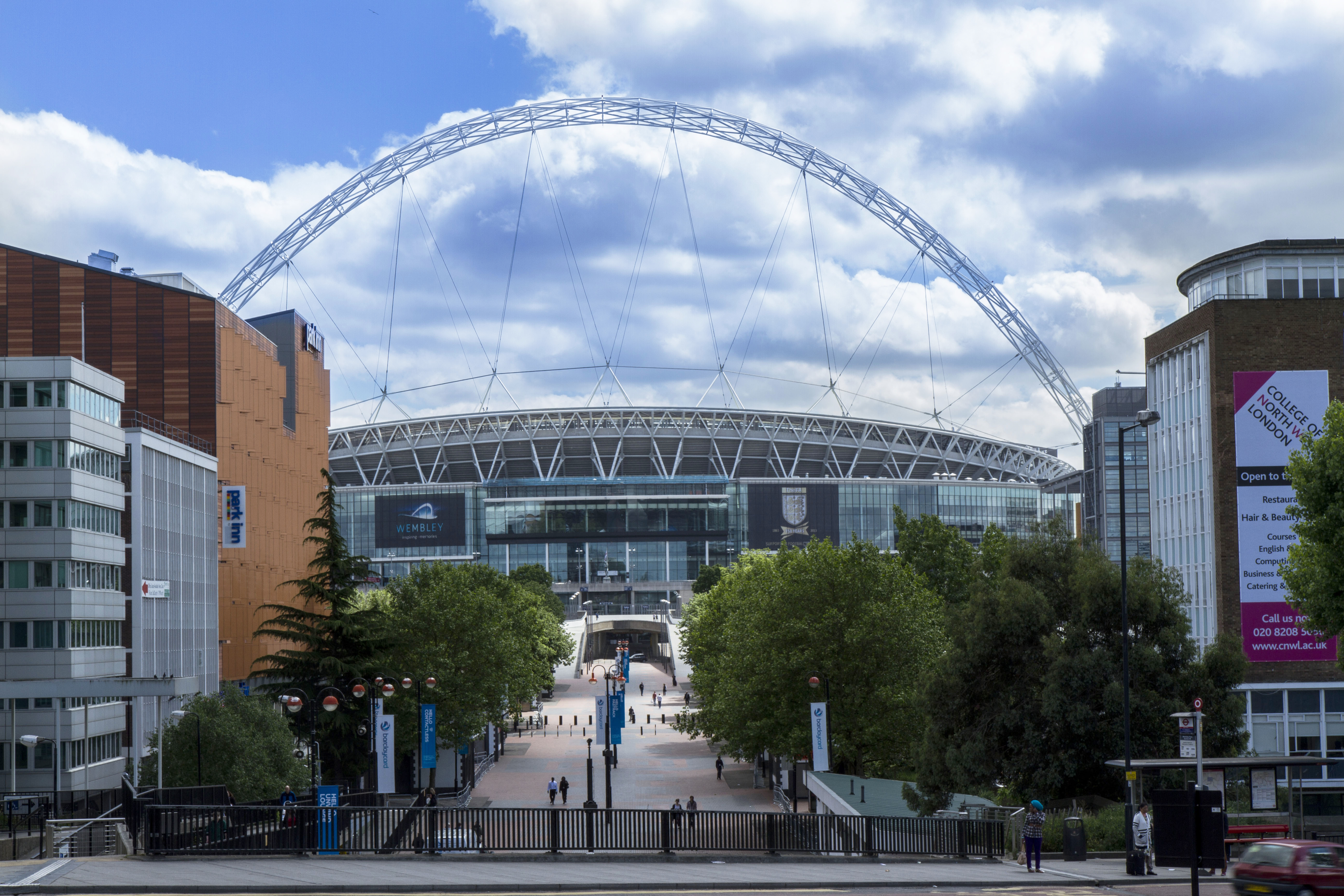
- Wembley Stadium will host the final in March

Tournament details
- Country: England; Wales
- Dates: 1 August 2026 – 21 March 2027
- Teams: 92

Tournament statistics
- Matches played: 84
- Goals scored: 258 (3.07 per match)
- Top goal scorer(s): Thierno Barry; Harry Leonard (4 goals each)
- All statistics correct as of 29 October 2026.

The 2026–27 EFL Cup is the 67th and current season of the English Football League Cup. It is sponsored by Carabao Energy Drink and known as the Carabao Cup for sponsorship reasons, with the 2026–27 season marking the tenth season of Carabao's sponsorship of the competition. The EFL Cup is open to all clubs participating in the Premier League and the English Football League.

The preliminary round began on 1 August 2026, followed by the tournament proper on 7 August 2026. This season's EFL Cup final will be held at Wembley Stadium on Sunday, 21 March 2027, marking the 20th consecutive year that the venue has hosted the competition's final.

Manchester City are the defending champions, having beaten Arsenal in the previous season's final. The winner of the competition qualifies for the play-off round of the 2027–28 UEFA Conference League.

== Teams ==
All 92 clubs in the Premier League and English Football League entered the season's EFL Cup. Access was distributed across the top 4 leagues of the English football league system.

There was a preliminary round before the first one due to the number of teams participating in Europe. This round consisted of the two newly promoted sides to 2026–27 League Two – York City and Rochdale – and the two lowest finishers not relegated from 2025–26 League Two, Tranmere Rovers and Crawley Town.

Phase	Clubs entering in this round	Clubs advancing from previous round	Number of ties	Week commencing
Preliminary round (4 clubs)	4 clubs from EFL League Two (two lowest-ranked clubs not relegated from previous season, and two newly promoted)	—N/a	2	27 July 2026
First round (70 clubs)	20 clubs from EFL League Two; 24 clubs from EFL League One; 24 clubs from EFL Championship	2 winners from preliminary round	35	3 August 2026
Second round (46 clubs)	11 Premier League clubs (not involved in European competitions)	35 winners from first round	23	24 August 2026
Third round (32 clubs)	9 Premier League clubs (involved in European competitions)	23 winners from second round	16	7 September 2026; 14 September 2026
Fourth round (16 clubs)	—N/a	16 winners from third round	8	26 October 2026
Quarter-finals (8 clubs)	—N/a	8 winners from fourth round	4	14 December 2026
Semi-finals (4 clubs)	—N/a	4 winners from quarter-finals	2 (over two-legs)	11 January 2027; 1 February 2027
Final (2 clubs)	—N/a	2 winners from semi-finals	1	21 March 2027

== Rule changes ==
The regulations governing the EFL Cup were amended ahead of the 2025–26 season to allow, in certain circumstances, a player to represent two clubs during the same season's competition.

Under those provisions, a player who transferred before the first leg of the semi-final could represent their new club in the second leg and, if selected, the final. A transfer completed after the first leg, however, rendered the player ineligible for any further participation in that season's competition. As a result, they could not feature in the final should their new club reach it.

For the 2026–27 season, the regulations have been amended further. A player who transfers during the winter transfer window is now permitted to appear in the final for their new club, provided they satisfy the other eligibility criteria. They cannot, however, represent one club in the first leg of the semi-final and another in the second.

There has also been a modest revision to the regulations concerning players on loan. From 2026 to 2027, a player registered on loan is automatically eligible to participate in the EFL Cup for their loan club, unless their parent club expressly provides otherwise. Previously, loan players needed written permission from their parent club before they could take part in the competition.

== Preliminary round ==
The preliminary round was required for the 2026–27 EFL Cup following the participation of nine Premier League clubs in European competitions, equalling the Premier League record set the previous season. It featured the two clubs promoted from the National League, York City and Rochdale, and the two clubs that finished 21st and 22nd respectively in the previous season's League Two, Tranmere Rovers and Crawley Town. The round reduced the number of teams entering the subsequent rounds so that 32 clubs could participate in the third round, when the nine European qualifiers entered the competition.

The draw was held on 3 June 2026, with Sanny Rudravajhala of Sky Sports hosting and former goalkeeper Lee Camp performing the draw. It paired newly promoted York City with Crawley Town at the York Community Stadium, while Tranmere Rovers were handed home advantage against Rochdale.

Tranmere Rovers and Rochdale contested the opening match of the preliminary round at Prenton Park on 1 August, drawing 2–2, with Rochdale winning the ensuing penalty shoot-out 2–1. Charlie Whitaker and Jordan Davies scored for Tranmere, while Ryan East and Zain Silcott-Duberry replied for Rochdale. Rochdale missed their first two penalties but converted their next two, while Tranmere missed four of their attempts in succession after scoring their first, resulting in their elimination. It was only the second EFL Cup meeting between the clubs, following Rochdale's 3–2 aggregate victory in the 1987–88 first round.

In the other preliminary-round tie, York City lost 2–0 to Crawley Town on 3 August, with Gianmarco Di Biase opening the scoring before Danilo Orsi sealed the win from the penalty spot. It marked York's return to the League Cup since 2015 and their first meeting with Crawley since the since the 2015–16 League Two campaign, when Crawley were unbeaten, winning one and drawing one.

Having both advanced as the visiting side in their preliminary-round ties, Rochdale and Crawley Town were drawn on the road in the first round but were eliminated by higher-division opposition, losing 2–0 to Bradford City and 1–0 to Watford, respectively.

Number of teams per tier still in the competition
Premier League (Note: Premier League teams will join the competition in the second and third round.)	Championship (Note: Championship and League One teams joined the competition in the first round.)	League One	League Two (Note: 20 League Two teams joined the competition in the first round.)	Total
20 / 20	24 / 24	24 / 24	24 / 24	92 / 92

1 August 2026	Tranmere Rovers (4)	2–2 (1–2 p)	Rochdale (4)	Birkenhead
15:00 BST	Whitaker 4'; Davies 60'	Report	East 11'; Silcott-Duberry 85'	Stadium: Prenton Park; Attendance: 4,136; Referee: Oliver Mackey
	Penalties
	Davies (penalty scored); Okoro (penalty missed); Ince (penalty missed); Whitaker (penalty missed); Baker-Richardson (penalty missed)		(penalty missed) Dieseruvwe; (penalty missed) Ebanks-Landell; (penalty scored) Francis; (penalty scored) Silcott-Duberry

3 August 2026	York City (4)	0–2	Crawley Town (4)	York
19:30 BST		Report	Di Biase 24'; Orsi 86' (pen.)	Stadium: York Community Stadium; Attendance: 4,788; Referee: Thomas Parsons

== First round ==
A total of 70 teams played in the first round: the two winners from the preliminary round, the remaining 20 from League Two (tier 4), 24 from League One (tier 3), and 24 from the Championship (tier 2). The draw for this round was split on a geographical basis into northern and southern sections, where teams were drawn against a team from the same section. The draw was held on 25 June 2026, hosted by Dharmesh Sheth and performed by Kevin Nolan and Luke Chambers.

The seventeen first-round ties in the northern section were played between 7 and 9 August 2026. Five ties were decided by penalty shoot-outs, with Barnsley, Burnley, Shrewsbury Town, Doncaster Rovers and Preston North End progressing.

Preston North End's match against Huddersfield Town was played at Goodison Park, Everton's former ground, because Preston's pitch at Deepdale was being re-laid. Preston had Lewis Gibson sent off in the 21st minute before Jusef Erabi equalised in stoppage time, allowing them to progress after the subsequent shoot-out.

By contrast, West Bromwich Albion recorded a convincing 4–1 victory over Rotherham United at the New York Stadium. Jimmy-Jay Morgan scored twice on his competitive debut for the club, while Harry Whitwell and Felix Horn Myhre also scored for the Championship side. Fábio Tavares scored a late consolation goal for Rotherham.

Elsewhere in the northern section, Sheffield Wednesday beat Bolton Wanderers 1–0, with Jamal Lowe scoring the decisive goal in the 70th minute. The clubs had swapped divisions over the summer, with Wednesday relegated to League One and Bolton promoted to the Championship.

Number of teams per tier still in the competition
Premier League (Note: Premier League teams joined the competition in the second and third round.)	Championship	League One	League Two	Total
20 / 20	24 / 24	24 / 24	22 / 24	90 / 92

=== Northern section ===
7 August 2026	Wolverhampton Wanderers (2)	3–0	Port Vale (4)	Wolverhampton
19:45 BST	Armstrong 14'; André 34'; López 43'	Report		Stadium: Molineux Stadium; Attendance: 21,360; Referee: David Webb

7 August 2026	Middlesbrough (2)	1–0	Wrexham (2)	Middlesbrough
20:00 BST	Lankshear 61'	Report		Stadium: Riverside Stadium; Attendance: 18,221; Referee: Will Finnie

8 August 2026	Barnsley (3)	1–1 (6–5 p)	Wigan Athletic (3)	Barnsley
15:00 BST	McGeehan 81'	Report	Costelloe 40'	Stadium: Oakwell; Attendance: 4,414; Referee: Richard Eley
	Penalties
	McGeehan (penalty scored); Kelly (penalty scored); Gale (penalty scored); Connell (penalty scored); Cleary (penalty scored); Earl (penalty scored)		(penalty scored) Power; (penalty scored) Carragher; (penalty scored) Higgins; (penalty scored) Weir; (penalty scored) Murray; (penalty missed) Mellish

8 August 2026	Bradford City (3)	2–0	Rochdale (4)	Bradford
15:00 BST	Swan 45+1'; Baldwin 67'	Report		Stadium: Valley Parade; Attendance: 6,915; Referee: Declan Brown

8 August 2026	Burnley (2)	1–1 (4–3 p)	Notts County (3)	Burnley
15:00 BST	Flemming 48'	Report	Roberts 42'	Stadium: Turf Moor; Attendance: 10,272; Referee: Thomas Parsons
	Penalties
	Flemming (penalty scored); Amdouni (penalty scored); Trésor (penalty scored); Mejbri (penalty missed); Walker (penalty scored)		(penalty missed) Acquah; (penalty scored) Campbell; (penalty scored) Grant; (penalty scored) Evans; (penalty missed) Bedeau

8 August 2026	Burton Albion (3)	1–2	Blackburn Rovers (2)	Burton upon Trent
15:00 BST	Scutt 14'	Report	Guðjohnsen 81'; Fevrier 88'	Stadium: Pirelli Stadium; Attendance: 2,839; Referee: Andrew Humphries

8 August 2026	Crewe Alexandra (4)	2–1	Accrington Stanley (4)	Crewe
15:00 BST	Lankester 6' (pen.); Moore 85'	Report	Rawson 65'	Stadium: Gresty Road; Attendance: 2,961; Referee: Ross Martin

8 August 2026	Derby County (2)	1–2	Lincoln City (2)	Derby
15:00 BST	Szmodics 45+1'	Report	House 3'; Jefferies 23'	Stadium: Pride Park Stadium; Attendance: 11,095; Referee: Joshua Smith

8 August 2026	Fleetwood Town (4)	1–0	Chesterfield (4)	Fleetwood
15:00 BST	Evans 15'	Report		Stadium: Highbury Stadium; Attendance: 1,619; Referee: Martin Coy

8 August 2026	Grimsby Town (4)	1–3	Blackpool (3)	Cleethorpes
15:00 BST	Rodgers 90+2'	Report	Ennis 3'; Bowler 58'; Kouassi 90+5'	Stadium: Blundell Park; Attendance: 4,817; Referee: Neil Hair

8 August 2026	Preston North End (2)	1–1 (4–3 p)	Huddersfield Town (3)	Liverpool
15:00 BST	Erabi 90+3'	Report	Balker 38'	Stadium: Goodison Park; Attendance: 6,120; Referee: Seb Stockbridge
	Penalties
	Devine (penalty scored); Erabi (penalty scored); McCann (penalty scored); Moran (penalty missed); Burgzorg (penalty scored)		(penalty missed) Ledson; (penalty missed) Harness; (penalty scored) Mumba; (penalty scored) Smith-Sway; (penalty scored) Taylor

8 August 2026	Salford City (4)	1–1 (3–4 p)	Shrewsbury Town (4)	Salford
15:00 BST	Malcolm 77'	Report	Davison 47'	Stadium: Moor Lane; Attendance: 1,936; Referee: Oliver Mackey
	Penalties
	Langstaff (penalty missed); Grant (penalty scored); Powell (penalty scored); Udoh (penalty missed); Graydon (penalty missed); Odoh (penalty missed); Oluwo (penalty scored); Turton (penalty missed)		(penalty missed) Sang; (penalty scored) Gbodé; (penalty scored) Turner-Cooke; (penalty missed) Price; (penalty missed) Ruffels; (penalty missed) Hoole; (penalty scored) Boyle; (penalty scored) Jude-Boyd

8 August 2026	Sheffield Wednesday (3)	1–0	Bolton Wanderers (2)	Sheffield
15:00 BST	J. Lowe 70'	Report		Stadium: Hillsborough Stadium; Attendance: 15,834; Referee: Elliot Bell

8 August 2026	Stockport County (3)	1–1 (4–5 p)	Doncaster Rovers (3)	Stockport
15:00 BST	Wootton 51'	Report	May 50'	Stadium: Edgeley Park; Attendance: 4,974; Referee: Leigh Doughty
	Penalties
	Osborn (penalty missed); Andrésson (penalty scored); Wootton (penalty scored); Fiorini (penalty scored); Adigun (penalty scored); O'Connell (penalty missed)		(penalty scored) May; (penalty scored) Broadbent; (penalty scored) Bailey; (penalty missed) Clifton; (penalty scored) Sterry; (penalty scored) Adelakun

8 August 2026	Stoke City (2)	2–0	Oldham Athletic (4)	Stoke-on-Trent
15:00 BST	Norburn 48' (o.g.); Boženík 82'	Report		Stadium: Bet365 Stadium; Attendance: 10,157; Referee: Edward Duckworth

8 August 2026	Rotherham United (4)	1–4	West Bromwich Albion (2)	Rotherham
17:30 BST	Tavares 87'	Report	Morgan 8', 61'; Whitwell 24'; Myhre 43'	Stadium: New York Stadium; Attendance: 4,850; Referee: Tom Reeves

9 August 2026	Mansfield Town (3)	0–3	Sheffield United (2)	Mansfield
16:00 BST		Report	Bamford 4'; McGuinness 71'; O'Hare 89'	Stadium: Field Mill; Attendance: 6,908; Referee: Stephen Martin

=== Southern section ===
6 August 2026	Bristol City (2)	0–1	Walsall (4)	Bristol
19:45 BST		Report	Pressley 47'	Stadium: Ashton Gate; Attendance: 9,992; Referee: Jacob Miles
Note: Fixture was initially scheduled for 7 August, but was rescheduled to avoid a clash with the Bristol International Balloon Fiesta.

7 August 2026	Wycombe Wanderers (3)	1–2	Stevenage (3)	High Wycombe
19:45 BST	Henderson 39'	Report	Kemp 27'; Magennis 90+5'	Stadium: Adams Park; Attendance: 2,510; Referee: Jamie O'Connor

8 August 2026	Cambridge United (3)	2–1	Barnet (4)	Cambridge
13:00 BST	Knight 52'; Heath 57'	Report	Tshimanga 49'	Stadium: Abbey Stadium; Attendance: 3,521; Referee: Carl Brook

8 August 2026	Queens Park Rangers (2)	1–1 (0–2 p)	Millwall (2)	Shepherd's Bush
14:00 BST	Sykes 86' (o.g.)	Report	Cundle 53'	Stadium: Loftus Road; Attendance: 9,759; Referee: Matt Donohue
	Penalties
	Chair (penalty missed); Vale (penalty missed); Saitō (penalty missed); Poku (penalty missed)		(penalty scored) Cooper; (penalty scored) Sykes; (penalty missed) Neghli; (penalty missed) Arconte

8 August 2026	AFC Wimbledon (3)	1–1 (5–4 p)	Newport County (4)	Wimbledon
15:00 BST	Maycock 90+7'	Report	Bamba 71'	Stadium: Plough Lane; Attendance: 3,393; Referee: Paul Howard
	Penalties
	Browne (penalty scored); Stockley (penalty scored); Tilley (penalty scored); Hippolyte (penalty scored); Seddon (penalty scored)		(penalty scored) Garner; (penalty scored) Norman; (penalty scored) Brennan; (penalty scored) Biggins; (penalty missed) Smith

8 August 2026	Bristol Rovers (4)	0–1	Peterborough United (3)	Bristol
15:00 BST		Report	Leonard 19' (pen.)	Stadium: Memorial Stadium; Attendance: 4,810; Referee: David Rock

8 August 2026	Bromley (3)	1–1 (4–5 p)	Reading (3)	Bromley
15:00 BST	Cheek 33'	Report	Stokes 14'	Stadium: Hayes Lane; Attendance: 3,496; Referee: Craig Hicks
	Penalties
	Adeboyejo (penalty scored); McKiernan (penalty scored); Ifill (penalty scored); Conteh (penalty scored); Archer (penalty missed)		(penalty scored) Wing; (penalty scored) Savage; (penalty scored) Marriott; (penalty scored) Fraser; (penalty scored) Williams

8 August 2026	Cardiff City (2)	3–2	Swindon Town (4)	Cardiff
15:00 BST	Salech 29' (pen.), 43'; Moylan 77'	Report	Osho 9' (o.g.); Glatzel 62'	Stadium: Cardiff City Stadium; Attendance: 6,168; Referee: Gavin Ward

8 August 2026	Gillingham (4)	0–3	Luton Town (3)	Gillingham
15:00 BST		Report	Wells 43'; Benagr 59'; Kodua 78'	Stadium: Priestfield Stadium; Attendance: 4,015; Referee: Stephen Parkinson

8 August 2026	Leicester City (3)	1–0	Northampton Town (4)	Leicester
15:00 BST	Okoli 15'	Report		Stadium: King Power Stadium; Attendance: 9,792; Referee: Oliver Yates

8 August 2026	Leyton Orient (3)	2–0	Oxford United (3)	Leyton
15:00 BST	Mitchell 85'; El Mizouni 88'	Report		Stadium: Brisbane Road; Attendance: 3,783; Referee: Alex Chilowicz

8 August 2026	Norwich City (2)	4–1	Milton Keynes Dons (3)	Norwich
15:00 BST	Touré 1'; Slimane 7'; Chrisene 43'; Brooks 59'	Report	Wintle 56'	Stadium: Carrow Road; Attendance: 20,056; Referee: Elliot Swallow

8 August 2026	Swansea City (2)	0–1	Birmingham City (2)	Swansea
15:00 BST		Report	Priske 44'	Stadium: Swansea.com Stadium; Attendance: 11,283; Referee: Ruebyn Ricardo

8 August 2026	Watford (2)	1–0	Crawley Town (4)	Watford
15:00 BST	Bola 90+9'	Report		Stadium: Vicarage Road; Attendance: 6,907; Referee: Harry Wager

8 August 2026	West Ham United (2)	3–1	Portsmouth (2)	Stratford
15:00 BST	Castellanos 43', 50'; Bowen 45'	Report	Segečić 33'	Stadium: London Stadium; Attendance: 53,369; Referee: Adam Herczeg

8 August 2026	Cheltenham Town (4)	1–3	Charlton Athletic (2)	Cheltenham
17:30 BST	Miller 55'	Report	Godden 22'; Carey 24'; Campbell 37'	Stadium: Whaddon Road; Attendance: 3,119; Referee: Alan Dale

8 August 2026	Colchester United (4)	0–2	Southampton (2)	Colchester
17:30 BST		Report	Larin 72'; Akachukwu 90+2'	Stadium: Colchester Community Stadium; Attendance: 5,822; Referee: Isaac Searle

10 August 2026	Plymouth Argyle (3)	2–0	Exeter City (4)	Plymouth
20:00 BST	Hartridge 90+2'; Pepple 90+4'	Report		Stadium: Home Park; Attendance: 16,755; Referee: Dean Whitestone

== Second round ==
A total of 46 teams played in the second round: 35 winners from the first round, and the 11 Premier League clubs not involved in European competitions. The draw for this round was split on a geographical basis into northern and southern sections, where teams were drawn against a team from the same section. The draw was made on 10 August 2026, hosted by David Prutton and performed by Jobi McAnuff and Jamie Mackie.

Number of teams per tier still in the competition
Premier League (Note: Nine Premier League teams joined the competition in the third round.)	Championship	League One	League Two	Total
20 / 20	17 / 24	14 / 24	4 / 24	55 / 92

=== Northern section ===
25 August 2026	Doncaster Rovers (3)	1–3	Middlesbrough (2)	Doncaster
19:30 BST	Hutchinson 90+2'	Report	Joseph 34'; Lankshear 78'; Sarmiento 87'	Stadium: Eco-Power Stadium; Attendance: 6,883; Referee: Edward Duckworth

25 August 2026	Barnsley (3)	3–2	Crewe Alexandra (4)	Barnsley
19:45 BST	Cleary 29'; Noslin 31'; O'Keeffe 38'	Report	Thibaut 21'; Ewusi 89'	Stadium: Oakwell; Attendance: 3,002; Referee: Leigh Doughty

25 August 2026	Blackburn Rovers (2)	1–2	Sheffield United (2)	Blackburn
19:45 BST	Afolayan 55'	Report	Cannon 20'; Donovan 81'	Stadium: Ewood Park; Attendance: 6,826; Referee: David Webb

25 August 2026	Blackpool (3)	1–4	Lincoln City (2)	Blackpool
19:45 BST	Clarkson 45'	Report	Olaofe 36'; Bayliss 53'; Street 55'; Elder 77'	Stadium: Bloomfield Road; Attendance: 2,407; Referee: Harry Wager

25 August 2026	Fleetwood Town (4)	4–0	Shrewsbury Town (4)	Fleetwood
19:45 BST	Boyle 8' (o.g.); Evans 28', 35'; Davies 90'	Report		Stadium: Highbury Stadium; Attendance: 1,066; Referee: Thomas Parsons

25 August 2026	Sheffield Wednesday (3)	0–2	Wolverhampton Wanderers (2)	Sheffield
19:45 BST		Report	Swinkels 3' (o.g.); Olagunju 45+1'	Stadium: Hillsborough Stadium; Attendance: 13,586; Referee: Ben Speedie

25 August 2026	Stoke City (2)	1–1 (4–5 p)	Hull City (1)	Stoke-on-Trent
19:45 BST	Boženík 39'	Report	Dowell 45'	Stadium: Bet365 Stadium; Attendance: 7,141; Referee: John Busby
	Penalties
	Thomas (penalty scored); Gallagher (penalty scored); Lawal (penalty scored); Hirst (penalty missed); Soumaré (penalty scored)		(penalty scored) Morita; (penalty scored) McNair; (penalty scored) Stroud; (penalty scored) Millar; (penalty scored) Belloumi

25 August 2026	Nottingham Forest (1)	0–2	Leeds United (1)	West Bridgford
20:00 BST		Report	James 50'; Justin 75'	Stadium: City Ground; Attendance: 24,542; Referee: Andrew Kitchen

26 August 2026	Bradford City (3)	0–0 (4–2 p)	Burnley (2)	Bradford
19:45 BST		Report		Stadium: Valley Parade; Attendance: 19,686; Referee: Martin Coy
	Penalties
	Sarcevic (penalty scored); Gillesphey (penalty scored); Touray (penalty scored); Phillips (penalty scored)		(penalty scored) Flemming; (penalty missed) Amdouni; (penalty missed) Larsen; (penalty scored) Edwards

26 August 2026	Newcastle United (1)	3–2	West Bromwich Albion (2)	Newcastle upon Tyne
19:45 BST	Touré 38'; Barnes 48', 81'	Report	Price 19', 77' (pen.)	Stadium: St James' Park; Attendance: 51,405; Referee: Bobby Madley

26 August 2026	Preston North End (2)	0–4	Everton (1)	Preston
20:00 BST		Report	Barry 25', 59', 70'; Johnson 72'	Stadium: Deepdale; Attendance: 16,834; Referee: Tony Harrington

=== Southern section ===
25 August 2026	Cardiff City (2)	1–2	Norwich City (2)	Cardiff
19:00 BST	Salech 90+3'	Report	Kvistgaarden 25'; Crnac 78'	Stadium: Cardiff City Stadium; Attendance: 5,432; Referee: James Bell

25 August 2026	Cambridge United (3)	0–1	Millwall (2)	Cambridge
19:45 BST		Report	Cooper 9'	Stadium: Abbey Stadium; Attendance: 5,363; Referee: Paul Howard

25 August 2026	Ipswich Town (1)	3–1	Leicester City (3)	Ipswich
19:45 BST	Egeli 62'; Núñez 71', 90+1'	Report	Aluko 67'	Stadium: Portman Road; Attendance: 21,559; Referee: Lewis Smith

25 August 2026	Plymouth Argyle (3)	2–4	Coventry City (1)	Plymouth
19:45 BST	Irow 21'; Amaechi 54'	Report	Awoniyi 3'; Rudoni 5'; Mason-Clark 67'; Torp 78'	Stadium: Home Park; Attendance: 14,210; Referee: Elliott Swallow

25 August 2026	Southampton (2)	1–4	West Ham United (2)	Southampton
19:45 BST	Scienza 10'	Report	Ajala 41', 53'; Castellanos 75'; Bowen 84'	Stadium: St Mary's Stadium; Attendance: 15,867; Referee: Ruebyn Ricardo

25 August 2026	Stevenage (3)	0–3	Reading (3)	Stevenage
19:45 BST		Report	Brown 9'; Lane 24'; Williams 85'	Stadium: Broadhall Way; Attendance: 2,013; Referee: Richard Eley

25 August 2026	Walsall (4)	0–0 (5–6 p)	Leyton Orient (3)	Walsall
19:45 BST		Report		Stadium: Bescot Stadium; Attendance: 2,679; Referee: Andrew Humphries
	Penalties
	Simper (penalty missed); Clarke (penalty scored); Hancock (penalty scored); Sodje (penalty scored); Pressley (penalty scored); Crew (penalty scored); Skura (penalty missed)		(penalty missed) Kabia; (penalty scored) Hayden; (penalty scored) Archibald; (penalty scored) El Mizouni; (penalty scored) Obiero; (penalty scored) Stevens; (penalty scored) Olowu

25 August 2026	Watford (2)	1–5	Peterborough United (3)	Watford
19:45 BST	Doumbia 73'	Report	Clarridge 10' (o.g.); Leonard 23', 51'; Shofowoke 55'; Jones 64'	Stadium: Vicarage Road; Attendance: 7,978; Referee: Isaac Searle

25 August 2026	Birmingham City (2)	1–6	Brentford (1)	Birmingham
20:00 BST	Gray 28'	Report	Wilson 6'; Hickey 35'; Collins 40', 77'; Damsgaard 70'; Thiago 73'	Stadium: St Andrew's; Attendance: 17,722; Referee: Tim Robinson

26 August 2026	Tottenham Hotspur (1)	5–1	Charlton Athletic (2)	Tottenham
19:45 BST	Moore 41'; Solanke 45'; Danso 67'; Sávio 82'; Davies 85'	Report	Jones 87'	Stadium: Tottenham Hotspur Stadium; Attendance: 49,008; Referee: Adam Herczeg

27 August 2026	Chelsea (1)	2–0	Luton Town (3)	Fulham
19:30 BST	Welbeck 50'; Odoffin 79' (o.g.)	Report		Stadium: Stamford Bridge; Attendance: 32,210; Referee: Elliot Bell

27 August 2026	Fulham (1)	3–0	AFC Wimbledon (3)	Fulham
20:00 BST	Smith Rowe 37'; Muniz 42'; García 90+3'	Report		Stadium: Craven Cottage; Attendance: 17,714; Referee: Anthony Backhouse

== Third round ==
32 teams played in the third round: the 23 second round winners, and the nine Premier League teams involved in European competition. The draw was made on 26 August 2026 by Jermaine Beckford and Jamie Redknapp.

In order to avoid scheduling issues, the eight clubs playing in the UEFA Champions League and UEFA Europa League could not be drawn against each other in the EFL Cup third round. There was a "pre-draw" to decide whether each of the eight clubs would play home or away. Eight clubs were then drawn from the remaining 24 to play against the eight Champions or Europa League sides. The remainder of the draw was open as usual.

Six Premier League clubs were eliminated in the third round, with all six defeats coming against fellow top-flight opposition. Tottenham Hotspur, Manchester United and Leeds United were joined in exiting the competition by newly promoted Ipswich Town, Hull City and Coventry City. Fleetwood Town, the only fourth-tier side to reach the third round, recorded the round's biggest upset by defeating Championship club Sheffield United 1–0, with goalkeeper Jay Lynch keeping his third clean sheet in as many EFL Cup matches this season.

Tottenham Hotspur's difficult start to the season continued with a 3–1 defeat against Liverpool at Anfield. Alexis Mac Allister and Cody Gakpo put Liverpool two goals ahead before Conor Gallagher reduced the deficit midway through the second-half, scoring Tottenham's first goal against Premier League opposition this season. Dominik Szoboszlai restored Liverpool's two-goal advantage in stoppage time with a long-range strike to send the ten-time winners into the fourth round.

The round also brought disappointment for Manchester United, who surrendered a two-goal lead against Brighton; Shea Lacey and Mason Mount gave United an early advantage, but Brighton responded through Charalampos Kostoulas, Pascal Groß and Maxim De Cuyper to win 3–2. It was the first time in 50 years that United had lost at home after leading by two goals.

In contrast, Chelsea produced a comeback of their own against Leeds United, recovering from 2–0 down to win 6–3 in a nine-goal contest, with eight of the nine goals coming after half-time. The match also marked the competitive debut of 16-year-old midfielder Reggie Watson, son of former Premier League player Ben Watson, who scored Wigan Athletic's FA Cup final winner against Manchester City in 2013. Reggie became the fourth-youngest player to start a competitive match in Chelsea's history at the time of his debut. Morgan Rogers was introduced at half-time and provided three assists as Chelsea scored six times after the break to complete their comeback.

Ryan Christie was another prominent individual performer in the third round, earning a nomination for the Carabao Cup Player of the Round. The Scottish midfielder scored three times in a 4–0 victory over Championship side Lincoln City, becoming the first Bournemouth player to achieve the feat in the League Cup. It came in Bournemouth's 175th League Cup match since the competition began in 1960.

Elsewhere, Everton advanced with a 1–0 victory over Wolverhampton Wanderers, while Coventry were defeated 3–1 by Aston Villa, with Tammy Abraham scoring twice. Fulham defeated West Ham 3–2, Brentford beat Reading 2–1, and Peterborough United overcame Barnsley 7–6 on penalties after a 3–3 draw, reaching the fourth round for the first time since 2009. Manager Luke Williams oversaw the victory before being sacked four days later.

Crystal Palace defeated Middlesbrough 3–0, with Jørgen Strand Larsen proving an aerial threat as he scored twice with headers and was involved in all three goals, setting up Daichi Kamada for the third. Earlier in the round, Newcastle United, Sunderland and Bradford City had also secured victories.

Arsenal also progressed, defeating Ipswich Town 4–2 at Portman Road. Sixteen-year-old Max Dowman, a fellow nominee for the Carabao Cup Player of the Round, scored a brace for the Gunners, while Mikel Merino and Noni Madueke also found the net.

The final third round fixture saw holders Manchester City begin their title defence with a 5–0 victory over Norwich City at the Etihad Stadium. Like Reggie Watson, 17-year-old Floyd Samba was the son of a former Premier League player, Christopher Samba. He scored twice on his senior debut, with Rayan Cherki, fellow debutant Allan and Ryan McAidoo also finding the net. City advanced to the fourth round, where they would face Brighton & Hove Albion. The two sides would meet again at the Etihad Stadium in the Premier League three days later.

Number of teams per tier still in the competition
Premier League	Championship	League One	League Two	Total
19 / 20	7 / 24	5 / 24	1 / 24	32 / 92

8 September 2026	Bournemouth (1)	4–0	Lincoln City (2)	Bournemouth
19:45 BST	Christie 7', 69', 88'; Rayan 90+4'	Report		Stadium: Dean Court; Attendance: 10,090; Referee: Elliot Bell

8 September 2026	Crystal Palace (1)	3–0	Middlesbrough (2)	Selhurst
19:45 BST	Larsen 37', 53'; Kamada 72'	Report		Stadium: Selhurst Park; Attendance: 13,074; Referee: Tony Harrington

8 September 2026	Leyton Orient (3)	1–3	Bradford City (3)	Leyton
19:45 BST	Gillesphey 38' (o.g.)	Report	Swan 45'; Humphrys 58'; Powell 88'	Stadium: Brisbane Road; Attendance: 2,465; Referee: Edward Duckworth

8 September 2026	Sunderland (1)	1–0	Hull City (1)	Sunderland
19:45 BST	Talbi 71'	Report		Stadium: Stadium of Light; Attendance: 25,472; Referee: Paul Tierney

8 September 2026	Millwall (2)	0–1	Newcastle United (1)	Bermondsey
20:00 BST		Report	Willock 81'	Stadium: The Den; Attendance: 14,698; Referee: Craig Pawson

9 September 2026	Chelsea (1)	6–3	Leeds United (1)	Fulham
20:15 BST	Palmer 53' (pen.), 55'; Neto 60'; Welbeck 65', 90+4'; Barco 80'	Report	Muharemović 23'; Aaronson 48'; Calvert-Lewin 75'	Stadium: Stamford Bridge; Attendance: 35,696; Referee: Jarred Gillett
Note: Kick-off was delayed by fifteen minutes due to disruption on the London Underground.

15 September 2026	Peterborough United (3)	3–3 (7–6 p)	Barnsley (3)	Peterborough
19:45 BST	Leonard 19'; Ormerod 27', 88'	Report	McGeehan 1'; Cleary 40', 74'	Stadium: London Road Stadium; Attendance: 3,105; Referee: Thomas Parsons
	Penalties
	Leonard (penalty scored); Ormerod (penalty scored); Conn-Clarke (penalty scored); Mills (penalty scored); Kelly (penalty scored); Feeney (penalty scored); Jones (penalty scored)		(penalty scored) Connell; (penalty scored) Kelly; (penalty scored) Noslin; (penalty scored) Kay; (penalty scored) Cleary; (penalty scored) Gale; (penalty missed) Alker

15 September 2026	West Ham United (2)	2–3	Fulham (1)	Stratford
19:45 BST	Morato 16'; Pablo 45+2'	Report	Muniz 13'; Palacios 37'; Bobb 78'	Stadium: London Stadium; Attendance: 41,808; Referee: Gavin Ward

15 September 2026	Ipswich Town (1)	2–4	Arsenal (1)	Ipswich
20:00 BST	Mehmeti 62'; Akpom 90+1'	Report	Dowman 7', 47'; Madueke 16'; Merino 58'	Stadium: Portman Road; Attendance: 28,966; Referee: Peter Bankes

15 September 2026	Liverpool (1)	3–1	Tottenham Hotspur (1)	Liverpool
20:00 BST	Mac Allister 21'; Gakpo 54'; Szoboszlai 90+1'	Report	Gallagher 69'	Stadium: Anfield; Attendance: 60,169; Referee: Andy Madley

15 September 2026	Reading (3)	1–2	Brentford (1)	Reading
20:00 BST	O'Connor 72'	Report	Wilson 3'; Carvalho 45+1'	Stadium: Madejski Stadium; Attendance: 13,489; Referee: Tom Nield

16 September 2026	Everton (1)	1–0	Wolverhampton Wanderers (2)	Liverpool
19:45 BST	Alcaraz 80'	Report		Stadium: Hill Dickinson Stadium; Attendance: 50,970; Referee: Thomas Bramall

16 September 2026	Fleetwood Town (4)	1–0	Sheffield United (2)	Fleetwood
19:45 BST	Norrington-Davies 57' (o.g.)	Report		Stadium: Highbury Stadium; Attendance: 2,348; Referee: Ben Speedie

16 September 2026	Coventry City (1)	1–3	Aston Villa (1)	Coventry
20:00 BST	Torp 27'	Report	Abraham 7', 59'; Barkley 40'	Stadium: Coventry Building Society Arena; Attendance: 24,577; Referee: Robert Jones

16 September 2026	Manchester United (1)	2–3	Brighton & Hove Albion (1)	Trafford
20:00 BST	Lacey 8'; Mount 10'	Report	Kostoulas 45+1'; Groß 65'; De Cuyper 69'	Stadium: Old Trafford; Attendance: 73,670; Referee: Farai Hallam

17 September 2026	Manchester City (1)	5–0	Norwich City (2)	Manchester
19:30 BST	Samba 29', 54'; Cherki 32'; Allan 48'; McAidoo 90'	Report		Stadium: Etihad Stadium; Attendance: 32,451; Referee: Ruebyn Ricardo

== Fourth round ==
The 16 third round winners were drawn to play each other in the fourth round. The draw took place on 16 September 2026, after the Manchester United vs Brighton & Hove Albion match concluded; Pien Meulensteen hosted the draw, while Jamie Redknapp and Ashley Young performed it. The eight matches took place in the week commencing 26 October 2026.

Fleetwood Town were the sole League Two side remaining, reaching this stage of the competition for the first time in the club's history. Drawn against the defending Premier League champions, Fleetwood Town hosted Arsenal at Highbury Stadium, which shared its name with Arsenal's former home ground. The hosts defeated Arsenal on penalties, becoming the first League Two side to reach the quarter-finals since 2019.

The League One meeting of Bradford City and Peterborough United featured little League Cup history between the sides. Posh had only faced Bradford once before in the competition during the 1977–78 opening round, while this was the furthest the Bantams had progressed since reaching the 2013 final at Wembley.

Xabi Alonso returned to Anfield as a manager outside of European competition for the first time, after Chelsea drew Liverpool in the fourth round. The tie marked the third time in six seasons that these two Premier League clubs faced off in the EFL cup, having contested the 2022 and 2024 finals.

The draw also featured five other all-Premier League ties, with Everton handed a showdown against 2025 winners Newcastle, in their bid to end a 31-year wait for domestic cup silverware. Bournemouth and Aston Villa, meanwhile, locked horns in the competition for the first time. The remaining fixtures included an all-London clash between Fulham and Crystal Palace, Brentford travelling to the Stadium of Light to take on Sunderland, while defending champions Manchester City faced Brighton.

Number of teams per tier still in the competition
Premier League	Championship	League One	League Two	Total
13 / 20	0 / 24	2 / 24	1 / 24	16 / 92

27 October 2026	Bradford City (3)	2–0	Peterborough United (3)	Bradford
19:45 GMT	Gillesphey 13'; Phiilips 67'	Report		Stadium: Valley Parade; Attendance: 14,732; Referee: Thomas Kirk

27 October 2026	Fleetwood Town (4)	1–1 (5–3 p)	Arsenal (1)	Fleetwood
20:00 GMT	Loupalo-Bi 21'	Report	Gyökeres 50'	Stadium: Highbury Stadium; Attendance: 5,002; Referee: Michael Salisbury
	Penalties
	Coughlan (penalty scored); Neal (penalty scored); Davies (penalty scored); Cannon (penalty scored); Haughey (penalty scored)		(penalty scored) Ødegaard; (penalty scored) Havertz; (penalty scored) Gyökeres; (penalty missed) Guimarães

28 October 2026	Manchester City (1)	2–2 (4–3 p)	Brighton & Hove Albion (1)	Manchester
19:30 GMT	Kovačić 40'; Reis 72'	Report	Yalcouyé 30'; Rutter 47'	Stadium: Etihad Stadium; Attendance: 55,343; Referee: Andy Madley
	Penalties
	Foden (penalty scored); Fernández (penalty scored); Doku (penalty scored); Kovačić (penalty missed); Cherki (penalty scored)		(penalty scored) Groß; (penalty scored) O'Riley; (penalty scored) De Cuyper; (penalty missed) Ayari; (penalty missed) Dunk

28 October 2026	Bournemouth (1)	3–0	Aston Villa (1)	Bournemouth
19:45 GMT	Adli 7'; Cook 51'; Rodríguez 69'	Report		Stadium: Dean Court; Attendance: 12,162; Referee: Tony Harrington

28 October 2026	Fulham (1)	0–1	Crystal Palace (1)	Fulham
19:45 GMT		Report	Nketiah 37'	Stadium: Craven Cottage; Attendance: 22,420; Referee: Simon Hooper

28 October 2026	Sunderland (1)	3–2	Brentford (1)	Sunderland
19:45 GMT	Talbi 26'; Tutyerov 29'; Fofana 39'	Report	Wilson 42'; Thiago 90+4'	Stadium: Stadium of Light; Attendance: 24,305; Referee: Gavin Ward

28 October 2026	Liverpool (1)	1–1 (6–5 p)	Chelsea (1)	Liverpool
20:00 GMT	Gakpo 43' (pen.)	Report	Rogers 40' (pen.)	Stadium: Anfield; Attendance: 60,214; Referee: Darren England
	Penalties
	Mac Allister (penalty scored); Isak (penalty scored); Gakpo (penalty scored); Wirtz (penalty scored); Tsimikas (penalty missed); Barcola (penalty scored); Gravenberch (penalty missed); Gomez (penalty scored)		(penalty scored) Neto; (penalty scored) Rogers; (penalty scored) Lavia; (penalty missed) Barco; (penalty scored) Henderson; (penalty scored) Colwill; (penalty missed) Emegha; (penalty missed) Fofana

29 October 2026	Everton (1)	3–1	Newcastle United (1)	Liverpool
19:45 GMT	Garner 34'; Hackney 45'; Barry 69'	Report	Burn 88'	Stadium: Hill Dickinson Stadium; Attendance: 51,894; Referee: Farai Hallam

== Quarter-finals ==
The eight fourth round winners play in the quarter-finals. The draw took place on 28 October 2026, after the conclusion of the Liverpool–Chelsea fourth round tie.

The quarter-final games will be played in the week of 14 December 2026.

The lowest-ranked team remaining in the competition is Fleetwood Town (League Two).

Number of teams per tier still in the competition
Premier League	Championship	League One	League Two	Total
6 / 20	0 / 24	1 / 24	1 / 24	8 / 92

15 December 2026	Manchester City (1)	v	Bradford City (3)	Manchester
20:00 GMT		Report		Stadium: Etihad Stadium

16 December 2026	Crystal Palace (1)	v	Sunderland (1)	Selhurst
19:30 GMT		Report		Stadium: Selhurst Park

16 December 2026	Liverpool (1)	v	Bournemouth (1)	Liverpool
20:00 GMT		Report		Stadium: Anfield

17 December 2026	Fleetwood Town (4)	v	Everton (1)	Fleetwood
20:00 GMT		Report		Stadium: Highbury Stadium

== Semi-finals ==
The four quarter-final winners are drawn to play the semi-finals. These are two-legged ties, the teams playing each other at home and away. The first leg will be played in the week commencing 11 January 2027, and the second in the week commencing 1 February 2027. If teams are tied on aggregate after two legs, the winner is decided by extra time, and then possibly a penalty shoot-out.

Number of teams per tier still in the competition
Premier League	Championship	League One	League Two	Total
2 / 20	0 / 24	0 / 24	0 / 24	4 / 92

== Statistics ==
=== Top goalscorers ===
Table correct as of 28 October 2026.

Rank	Player	Club	Goals
1	(France) Thierno Barry	Everton	4
1	(England) Harry Leonard	Peterborough United	4
3	(Argentina) Taty Castellanos	West Ham United	3
3	(Scotland) Ryan Christie	Bournemouth	3
3	(England) Reyes Cleary	Barnsley	3
3	(Wales) Ched Evans	Fleetwood Town	3
3	(Denmark) Yousef Salech	Cardiff City	3
3	(England) Danny Welbeck	Chelsea	3
3	(England) Callum Wilson	Brentford	3
10	Twenty-two players		2

==== Hat-tricks ====
Player	For	Against	Result	Date
(France) Thierno Barry	Everton	Preston North End	4–0 (A)	26 August 2026
(Scotland) Ryan Christie	Bournemouth	Lincoln City	4–0 (H)	8 September 2026

=== Clean sheets ===
Table correct as of 28 October 2026.

Rank	Player	Club	Clean sheets
1	(England) Jay Lynch	Fleetwood Town	3
1	(Scotland) Jon McCracken	Bradford City	3
3	(Italy) Michele Di Gregorio	Bournemouth	2
3	(England) Jordan Pickford	Everton	2
3	(England) Jed Ward	Walsall	2
6	Twenty-six players		1

== Awards ==
Round	Player of the Round		Goal of the Round		References
Round	Player	Club	Player	Club	References
First round	(Denmark) Yousef Salech	Cardiff City	(England) Will Lankshear	Middlesbrough	
Second round	(France) Thierno Barry	Everton	(England) Dapo Afolayan	Blackburn Rovers	
Third round	(England) Max Dowman	Arsenal	(Hungary) Dominik Szoboszlai	Liverpool	
Fourth round	Pending		Pending		
