= Big Ron Manager =

2006 British television documentary series

- Narrated by: Jeff Stelling
- Country of origin: United Kingdom

Production
- Production company: North One Television

Original release
- Network: Sky One
- Release: 22 August – 19 September 2006

Big Ron Manager is a television documentary series based on Ron Atkinson's efforts as a troubleshooter at the English football club Peterborough United, at the time playing in League Two. The series was screened on Sky One in 2006.

== Overview ==
Originally, the show was going to feature Swindon Town and Sky spent around four weeks filming there before being asked to leave by the Swindon management. Peterborough United received a fee of around £100,000 from Sky for access to the changing rooms and for Ron Atkinson to assist the rookie manager Steve Bleasdale.

Bleasdale was the club’s caretaker manager. He had been assistant manager to Mark Wright who had been sacked for allegedly making a racial joke towards one of his players. Bleasdale had only managed once before, at Leigh RMI where the side was relegated from the Conference National. Results were initially good under Bleasdale. At the start of the documentary, Peterborough won four games out of five and were in the play-offs. However, the club quickly suffered a downturn in form and eventually moved into eighth place after several defeats. Over a short space of time, tension began to show between Bleasdale and Atkinson.

There were several instances during the filming of Atkinson upsetting Bleasdale:

- Bleasdale accusing Atkinson of having an agenda against him which led to Atkinson calling him "insecure". As a result, Bleasdale banned him from the dressing room on matchdays. The decision was later overturned.
- Although the club were short of funds, Atkinson persuaded the club's Chairman Barry Fry to hire goalkeeping coach Tony Godden.
- The pair disagreeing on tactics and style of play.
- Suggesting during an injury crisis to sign Queens Park Rangers striker Stefan Moore on loan. Bleasdale instead signed Lloyd Opara on a free transfer from Cheshunt.
- Bleasdale admitted his annoyance at Atkinson "criticising" his players in a half-time team talk. Atkinson stated he simply made an observation and spoke with the two players later who were fine with his feedback.

Some scenes highlighted the chaos behind the scenes at the club, including a dressing room brawl between Mark Arber and Paul Carden, and Bleasdale rowing with youngsters Sean St Ledger and Danny Crow. Both Crow and St Ledger protested against extra training and on one occasion, Crow stormed out of the training ground. The show also picked upon the financial struggles at the club.

In one incident, Bleasdale asked St Ledger to leave the training ground following a row. Due to numerous injuries, Bleasdale puts St Ledger back in the side but states that he will play him out of position. With several scouts coming to the game to assess St Ledger, Fry decided to take charge of their important game against Macclesfield Town and start St Ledger in his usual position and offers to face the press should Peterborough lose. This led to Bleasdale walking out and resigning only an hour before kick-off. Barry Fry then put himself in charge for the final two games of the season.

== Episode overview ==
| No. | Title | Original release date |
|---|---|---|
| 1 | "Episode 1" | 22 August 2006 |
Young manager Steve Bleasdale has his Peterborough side in the League Two play-off spots following a good run of form. Chairman Barry Fry then brings in Ron Atkinson as a Football Troubleshooter to help assist Bleasdale. Atkinson believes that the players do not have respect for Bleasdale.
| 2 | "Episode 2" | 29 August 2006 |
After a disappointing defeat at Torquay United, Bleasdale lays into the squad and is looking to recruit some new players. Fry discusses with Atkinson the poor finances at the club. Bleasdale overrules Atkinson's suggestion of signing Stefan Moore on loan and instead opts to sign non-league striker Lloyd Opara. The first bit of tension is starting to show between the two. Following a defeat away at Oxford United, a fight breaks out between the players in the dressing room.
| 3 | "Episode 3" | 5 September 2006 |
Some players are refusing to take up extra training which leads to crisis talks between the players and management. Fry is starting to become critical of Bleasdale. An away win at Bury sees Bleasdale offer an opposition fan outside for a fight - Bleasdale later apologises in the press.
| 4 | "Episode 4" | 12 September 2006 |
Bleasdale faces an injury crisis before a big game against Boston United. A defeat in their next game against Rochdale sees Peterborough fall out of the play-off zone. Sean St Ledger storms out of training due to an argument with Bleasdale. Fry then decides to take charge of their game against Macclesfield Town and starts St Ledger, much to Bleasdale's annoyance. Bleasdale then resigns on camera under an hour before kick-off. Fry and Atkinson are now set to take charge for the rest of the season.
| 5 | "Episode 5" | 19 September 2006 |
Bleasdale now claims he only wished to resign as manager but wanted to stay on as a coach at the club. Fry offers Bleasdale a financial package to leave the club. Atkinson takes the team for training and is also arranging a golf day to raise funds for the club. Peterborough lose to Leyton Orient but could still make the play-offs on the final day of the season. Peterborough end up losing 2-0 to Wycombe Wanderers and finish eighth in League Two. Fans start protests wanting Fry to leave the club. Bleasdale later talks about his time as Peterborough and states he resigned because of dressing room interference but says he did a good job under the circumstances and should have won manager of the month.
| 6 | "When Big Ron Went Iffy (Special)" | 26 September 2006 |
A one-off special prior to filming at Peterborough. Atkinson is brought in at struggling League One side Swindon Town to help out rookie manager Iffy Onuora. However, Sky and Atkinson were asked to leave the club after four weeks of filming.

== Awards ==
In 2007, the programme won a Royal Television Society (RTS) Programme Award for Best Sports Show. The judges noted that the show was a "hugely entertaining entry into a sporting world that sometimes beggared belief."

== Aftermath ==
Big Ron Manager was regarded as a low point in the fortunes of Peterborough United. However, it proved the catalyst for future revival. Barry Fry stated that "The documentary has created so much interest throughout the world. I have had many people flying in from France, Scotland, Portugal and Spain to come and see me wanting to help this club in sponsorship and investment." Property businessman Darragh MacAnthony—who previously had no connection with the club—watched the show on television and after a few months purchased the club and later became chairman. Under MacAnthony's investment and his appointment of Darren Ferguson as the club's manager in 2007, Peterborough gained promotion to League One in 2008 and then to the Championship in 2009. Fry also stated that MacAnthony buying the club was the "best thing" that personally ever happened to him. Speaking to FourFourTwo magazine, he said: "He saved my life. I couldn't have carried on like that, the worry would've killed me."

Bleasdale struggled to gain work in football due to his reputation gained from the documentary. He later managed part-time sides Leigh Genesis and Bangor City. Bleasdale spoke openly to the media expressing his disappointment in how the documentary was edited and criticised Atkinson, claiming he "didn't learn anything" from him. In 2021, Fry said of Bleasdale’s decision to resign: "Obviously no manager likes to be told who to play, but as owner of the football club I had to pay the bills. I had to make that decision. He was all right, saying ‘yeah, yeah’, then the next minute we were in the dressing room and he resigned. In the end, we sold Sean for a few hundred thousand. Steve was paranoid about Ron, but he was never a threat." Bleasdale now works as a wedding photographer.

Striker Danny Crow claimed that the show hindered his chances of career progression. Speaking to the local media in 2020, Crow said "I was portrayed badly by the programme and I believe that it affected my career. It harmed my chances of progressing." He stated that he has never watched it but people regularly speak to him about it. He said "Opposition defenders would then say to me oh you’re that so and so from the documentary. They didn’t know me and yet they were having a go at me." Crow was seen as a big prospect but he left Peterborough on a free transfer in 2008 and signed for rivals Cambridge United. He also went on to play for Luton Town, Newport County, Lowestoft Town and Sudbury before moving into coaching.

Sean St Ledger told The Athletic that he was "embarrassed" when he watched the show and felt his attitude was "cringy", but also claimed some parts of the show were staged. St Ledger joked about suing Sky TV after claiming the programme showed him as the team's "bad boy". This was reported in the media and St Ledger later clarified that the statement was a joke. St Ledger was later a part of the Republic of Ireland UEFA Euro 2012 squad.

Then club captain Phil Bolland is now a qualified physio and works for Liverpool. Bolland said in an interview with FourFourTwo that people still spoke to him about the show. He also stated that he felt Bleasdale was "edited unfairly". Bolland spoke critically of Atkinson, saying: "I think it was purely for him – I don't think he had any interest in us or the play-offs. His driver brought him in, his driver took him away and that was it." Bolland also claimed that some parts of the show were staged. In the same piece, Fry denies that any of the show was staged saying: "On my mother's grave, there were no set-ups whatsoever." Fry also said that he wished he had asked Sky for more money for producing the show.

Fry also defended his decision to agree to the documentary saying "I’m criticised a lot for putting Peterborough in that position. But it kept everybody in a job, paying their mortgage or their rent, so I don’t mind the stick. I nearly got thrown out of the city of Peterborough, but I was doing it for the right reasons – to keep the club afloat."

Lloyd Opara, the striker brought in by Bleasdale instead of Atkinson's suggestion of Stefan Moore, left the club the next season and never played in the Football League again. After quitting football, Opara became a teacher.
