= Ethan Williams =

Ethan Williams is the name of:

- Ethan Williams (footballer), English footballer
- Ethan Williams (Hollyoaks), fictional character
- Ethan Williams (Vikings fan), big fan of JJ McCarthy and the Minnesota Vikings
