= Steve Bleasdale =

English football manager

Personal information
- Date of birth: 17 January 1960 (age 66)
- Place of birth: Liverpool, England

Youth career
- Years: Team
- Liverpool
- Wolverhampton Wanderers
- Sheffield Wednesday

Managerial career
- 2005: Leigh RMI
- 2006: Peterborough United (caretaker)
- 2006–2007: Bangor City
- 2007–2008: Leigh Genesis

Stephen Bleasdale (born 17 January 1960) is a former English football coach. He has managed Bangor City, Leigh Genesis and Football League side Peterborough United.

Bleasdale has often worked alongside former England footballer Mark Wright having worked with him as a coach at Oxford United, Southport, Peterborough United and twice as assistant at Chester City.

Bleasdale is best known for appearing in the fly-on-the-wall documentary Big Ron Manager while he was manager at Peterborough.

== Career ==
=== Early career ===
Steve's playing career was cut short by a knee injury while he was in the youth team at Sheffield Wednesday. Bleasdale also played in the academy sides at Liverpool and Wolverhampton Wanderers. His early coaching roles saw him work at Preston North End and Everton where he coached the Under 14s and 16s respectively. While at Everton, he coached Wayne Rooney. He also ran soccer schools in the Liverpool area and has worked for The FA on coaching programmes aimed at young coaches.

In 2000, Bleasdale worked as youth team coach at Southport while Mark Wright was first team manager. In 2001, Bleasdale was assistant manager to Wright at Oxford United. He later joined Chester City as first team coach under Wright and was then promoted as Wright's assistant manager in July 2002. They won promotion from the Football Conference in the 2003-04 season.

Bleasdale had a short spell as manager of Leigh RMI towards the end of the 2004–05 season. Leigh were relegated from the Conference National and Bleasdale left shortly after to take up the role of assistant manager at Peterborough United alongside Wright.

=== Peterborough United and Big Ron Manager documentary ===
Peterborough manager Mark Wright was sacked in January 2006 which led to Bleasdale being appointed caretaker manager until the end of the season. After an excellent start, winning five of his first seven games in charge and taking the club to being close to the automatic promotion places, the club suffered a downturn and ended up finishing outside the League Two playoffs.

Bleasdale's time at Peterborough was notable due to the capacity of Ron Atkinson who had been brought to the club in a "Football Troubleshooting" capacity by Sky Television who were making a documentary called Big Ron Manager. Bleasdale infamously quit an hour before Posh's game with Macclesfield Town due to chairman Barry Fry selecting the team and inferring that Bleasdale was out of his depth as manager. The next day, Bleasdale claimed that he only wished to resign as manager but wanted to remain at the club as a coach. Off camera, Bleasdale and Fry agreed to a financial settlement for him to leave the club. While Bleasdale was not entitled to any money, Fry agreed as he was sympathetic as Bleasdale resigned with no job lined up and had a "big mortgage".

Reflecting on his time at Peterborough, Bleasdale was critical of Atkinson and believed the documentary wasn't edited fairly. Speaking to BBC Radio Cambridgeshire after his resignation, Bleasdale said that he felt he did a good job and should have received the Manager of the Month award.

=== Later career ===
Due to his reputation gained from the documentary, Bleasdale struggled to gain employment in football. He unsuccessfully applied for the vacant managers jobs at AFC Bournemouth, Stevenage, Forest Green Rovers and Cambridge United.

Bleasdale took up the managerial role at Cymru Premier side Bangor City in November 2006. Despite a poor start, Bleasdale turned around the club's bad run of form and won the Manager of the Month Award in February 2007. In May 2007, Bleasdale resigned as manager of Bangor much to the surprise of the board. It was later revealed Bleasdale quit as he wished to move back into English football and struggled with the travelling involved.

In October 2007, Bleasdale was appointed manager at Conference North side Leigh Genesis. The club was relegated at the end of the 2007–08 season after finishing bottom of the league. Bleasdale resigned as manager in October 2008 due to the financial troubles at the club.

On 14 November 2008, Bleasdale again joined Mark Wright as assistant at Chester City who at the time were in League Two. However, on 21 February 2009, it was announced he had left the club, due to unspecified reasons, described by Wright as "there are a few things we’re not happy about and we’ll just have to get on with it. There are some things behind the scenes which I feel very, very let down about and which I’m not prepared to elaborate on at this time." It later transpired that Bleasdale had been sacked following a row with Wright and the club chairman.

== Coaching badges ==
Bleasdale has obtained both the UEFA A and Pro licences. He obtained the Pro Licence in 2007. At the time, it made him one of the highest qualified coaches in the English football pyramid outside of the Football League.

== Personal life ==
As shown on Big Ron Manager, Steve is married to his childhood sweetheart Karen. After struggling to get work as a football coach, he now works as a wedding photographer and runs his own business called Capture Your Moments.

== Managerial statistics ==
Managerial record by team and tenure
Team	From	To	Record				
Team	From	To	P	W	D	L	Win %
Peterborough United (caretaker)	26 January 2006	30 May 2006	17	7	1	9	41.2
