= Darragh MacAnthony =

Irish football chairman, author and entrepreneur (born 1976)

- Born: Darragh MacAnthony; 24 March 1976 (age 49); Dublin, Ireland
- Occupations: Entrepreneur, real estate, football club chairman, author
- Parent: Austin MacAnthony
- Website: http://www.darraghmacanthony.com

Darragh MacAnthony (born 24 March 1976) is an Irish football chairman, author and adult entertainments entrepreneur. He also has a podcast named The Hard Truth where he discusses Peterborough United and other football related topics.

== Early life and education ==
MacAnthony, the son of Austin MacAnthony, a nightclub owner, MacAnthony was educated at St Mary's College, Dublin. He moved to Zimbabwe with his family as a 15-year-old. He is a fan of Liverpool FC.

== Peterborough United ==
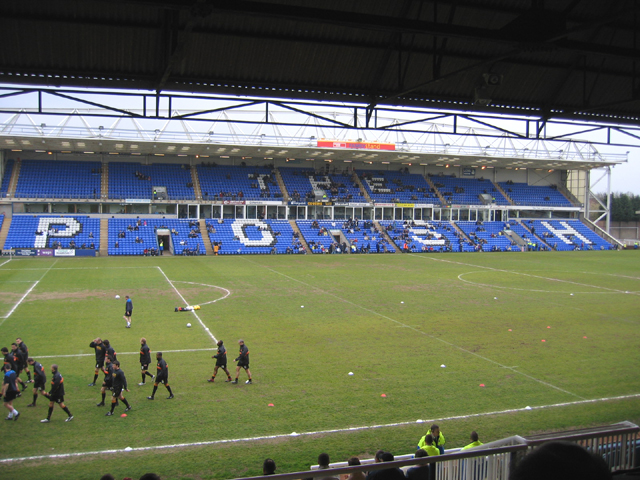
MacAnthony became Peterborough United chairman in 2006.

Since September 2006 MacAnthony has been chairman of Peterborough United F.C. Outgoing chairman Barry Fry cited a Sky One documentary, Big Ron Manager, as a factor in attracting investment from MacAnthony.

MacAnthony took over as chairman at Peterborough at the age of 30, making him the youngest chairman in the Football League. As a sign of his ambition, a printed note from MacAnthony was added to Peterborough United's match programme in August 2007. In it, he promised fans promotion from League Two to the Championship in two seasons, which was duly delivered, though the club were subsequently relegated to League One. MacAnthony became owner of the club in August 2007, buying the club for a nominal £1 after taking on the club's debts.

In January 2007, manager Keith Alexander was sacked and replaced by Darren Ferguson, who was at the time untried as a manager. Ferguson initially delivered large returns, delivering back-to-back promotions in his first two full seasons. Ferguson left Peterborough, by mutual consent, on 9 November 2009 after a disappointing start to the 2009–10 season. Peterborough were relegated in 2010.

In the 2010–11 season MacAnthony reappointed Darren Ferguson, and Peterborough United were once again promoted to the second tier. The club spent two seasons in the Championship after winning promotion. On 4 May 2013, Peterborough were relegated to League One after losing to Crystal Palace 3–2 on the final match of the Championship season. Peterborough's total of 54 points during the 2012–13 season is the highest by a relegated team in Championship history.

== Business interests ==
MacAnthony attended a business college in London, but left after three months. He formed the property group Macanthony Realty International (MRI) in 2000, selling overseas holiday homes to mainly Irish and British customers. From a head office in Marbella, the company offered properties in countries including the Bahamas, Bulgaria, Cyprus and the Dominican Republic, with MacAnthony stating in 2005 that he gave the number of his personal mobile telephone to clients.

The Sunday Times Rich List estimated his wealth at £150 million in 2007, and £68 million in 2008.

MacAnthony provided £250,000 for the Helping Hands Group at the time it opened, a private company which supports disabled people in the Peterborough Area.

MacAnthony appeared in court in April 2012, charged with 'Theft and Swindle' relating to furniture packs purchased by clients of MRI Overseas Property which the clients claimed were never delivered. MacAnthony has constantly denied the claims but the solicitor representing the clients, Antonio Flores, claims he has further clients wishing to take action against MacAnthony once the first case is completed.

In September 2011 a former employee was awarded €157,767.31, plus interest and legal fees by a Spanish Court, for the non-payment of commission by MacAnthony Realty International (MRI).

MacAnthony published an autobiography, From Hobby To Obsession in 2012.
