= Ethan Williams (footballer) =

English footballer (born 2005)

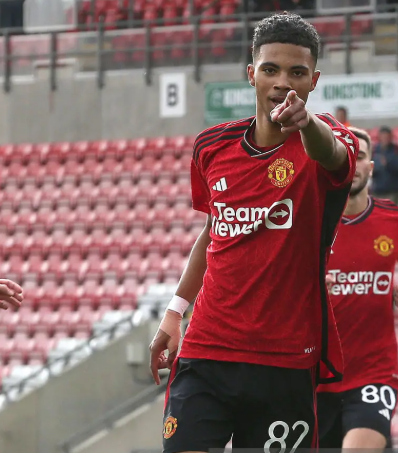

Personal information
- Full name: Ethan Demai Williams
- Date of birth: 14 November 2005 (age 21)
- Place of birth: Manchester, England
- Height: 1.75 m (5 ft 9 in)
- Position: Winger

Team information
- Current team: Peterborough United
- Number: 10

Youth career
- Rochdale
- 2019–2024: Manchester United

Senior career*
Years	Team	Apps	(Gls)
2024–2026	Manchester United	0	(0)
2025	→ Cheltenham Town (loan)	17	(2)
2025–2026	→ Falkirk (loan)	23	(1)
2026–	Peterborough United	13	(0)
- * Club domestic league appearances and goals as of 13:06, 22 November 2026 (UTC)

Ethan Demai Williams (born 14 November 2005) is an English professional footballer who plays as a winger for EFL League One club Peterborough United.

== Career ==
Born in Manchester, Williams began his career with Rochdale, signing for Manchester United in 2019.

He moved on loan to Cheltenham Town in January 2025. On 31 August 2025, Williams began a season-long loan with Falkirk.

On 13 August 2026, Williams joined Peterborough United on a long term contract.

== Career statistics ==
As of match played 21 November 2026

Appearances and goals by club, season and competition
Club	Season	League			National Cup		League Cup		Other		Total	
Club	Season	Division	Apps	Goals	Apps	Goals	Apps	Goals	Apps	Goals	Apps	Goals
Manchester United U21	2023–24	—			—		—		2 (Note: Appearances in the EFL Trophy)	0	2	0
Manchester United U21	2024–25	—			—		—		2	0	2	0
Manchester United U21	Total		0	0	0	0	0	0	4	0	4	0
Manchester United	2024–25	Premier League	0	0	0	0	0	0	0	0	0	0
Manchester United	2025–26	Premier League	0	0	0	0	0	0	0	0	0	0
Manchester United	Total		0	0	0	0	0	0	0	0	0	0
Cheltenham Town (loan)	2024–25	League Two	17	2	—		—		0	0	17	2
Falkirk (loan)	2025–26	Scottish Premiership	23	1	1	0	0	0	0	0	24	1
Peterborough United	2026–27	League One	13	0	1	0	3	0	3	1	20	1
Career total			53	3	2	0	3	0	7	1	65	4

== Personal life ==
His uncle is former footballer Alex Williams, who played for Manchester City.
