= Lucca Mendonça =

Brazilian footballer

Personal information
- Full name: Lucca Aboim Poyart de Mendonça
- Date of birth: 2 October 2007 (age 19)
- Place of birth: Rio de Janeiro, Brazil
- Height: 1.83 m (6 ft 0 in)
- Position: Defender

Team information
- Current team: Peterborough United
- Number: 18

Youth career
- –2025: Peterborough United

Senior career*
Years	Team	Apps	(Gls)
2025–	Peterborough United	6	(0)
- * Club domestic league appearances and goals as of 17:24, 10 October 2026 (UTC)

Lucca Aboim Poyart de Mendonça (born 2 October 2007) is a Brazilian professional footballer who plays as a defender for EFL League One club Peterborough United.

== Career ==
=== Peterborough United ===
Born in Brazil, Mendonca signed a professional contract at Peterborough United on 21 June 2025.

Mendonca made his debut for "The Posh" on 12 August 2025 in the EFL Cup in a 2–1 defeat to Accrington Stanley. He then went on to make his first league start on 27 January 2026 in a 1–0 defeat to Stevenage.

== Career statistics ==
As of match played 27 March 2026

Appearances and goals by club, season and competition
Club	Season	League			FA Cup		League Cup		Other		Total	
Club	Season	Division	Apps	Goals	Apps	Goals	Apps	Goals	Apps	Goals	Apps	Goals
Peterborough United	2025–26	League One	3	0	0	0	1	0	4	0	8	0
Career total			3	0	0	0	1	0	4	0	8	0
