= Harrison Jones (English footballer) =

English footballer (born 2004)

Personal information
- Full name: Harrison Martin Jones
- Date of birth: 25 December 2004 (age 21)
- Place of birth: York, England
- Height: 1.85 m (6 ft 1 in)
- Position: Midfielder

Team information
- Current team: Peterborough United
- Number: 7

Youth career
- 2011–2024: Sunderland

Senior career*
Years	Team	Apps	(Gls)
2024–2026	Sunderland	4	(0)
2026–	Peterborough United	5	(0)
- * Club domestic league appearances and goals as of 6 September 2026

Harrison Martin Jones (born 25 December 2004) is an English professional footballer who plays as a midfielder for EFL League One club Peterborough United.

== Career ==
=== Sunderland ===
Jones joined Sunderland at the age of six. On 30 June 2023, he signed his first professional contract with the club. He made his professional debut on 13 August 2024 in the EFL Cup, in a 2–0 defeat against Preston North End. On 23 December 2024, he signed a new contract with the club until 2026. On 11 January 2025, he started in a 2–1 FA Cup defeat against Stoke City. He made his Championship debut on 28 February 2025, coming on as a late substitute in a 2–1 away win against Sheffield Wednesday.

=== Peterborough United ===
On 18 June 2026, Jones joined League One side Peterborough United on a three-year contract for an undisclosed fee. He made his debut for the club on 8 August 2026, in a 1–0 win against Bristol Rovers in the EFL Cup. He scored his first goal for the club on 25 August 2026, in a 5–1 win against Watford in the EFL Cup.

== Career statistics ==
As of match played 25 August 2026

Appearances and goals by club, season and competition
Club	Season	League			FA Cup		EFL Cup		Other		Total	
Club	Season	Division	Apps	Goals	Apps	Goals	Apps	Goals	Apps	Goals	Apps	Goals
Sunderland	2024–25	Championship	4	0	1	0	1	0	0	0	6	0
Sunderland	2025–26	Premier League	0	0	0	0	1	0	—		1	0
Sunderland	Total		4	0	1	0	2	0	0	0	7	0
Peterborough United	2026–27	League One	2	0	0	0	2	1	0	0	4	1
Career total			6	0	1	0	4	1	0	0	11	1

== Honours ==
Sunderland

- EFL Championship play-offs: 2025
