= Danny Ormerod =

English footballer (born 2006)

Personal information
- Full name: Daniel Lee Ormerod
- Date of birth: 19 April 2006 (age 20)
- Place of birth: Blackpool, England
- Position: Forward

Team information
- Current team: Peterborough United
- Number: 27

Youth career
- Blackpool
- 2021–2023: AFC Fylde

Senior career*
Years	Team	Apps	(Gls)
2023–2026	AFC Fylde	103	(38)
2023	→ Burscough (loan)	0	(0)
2024	→ Chorley (loan)	5	(3)
2026–	Peterborough United	12	(0)
- * Club domestic league appearances and goals as of 08:19, 3 November 2026 (UTC)

Daniel Lee Ormerod (born 19 April 2006) is an English professional footballer who plays as a forward for EFL League One club Peterborough United.

== Career ==
=== AFC Fylde ===
Ormerod came through the youth academy at AFC Fylde after previously being with Blackpool. In 2023, he had spells with Burscough and Lostock St Gerards. In November 2023, he signed his first professional contract with the club. In July 2024, he signed a new two-year contract with the club. In November 2024, he joined National League North club Chorley on a one-month loan. He was recalled from his loan on 30 November.

Ormerod's breakthrough season came in 2025–26 as he won the National League North with AFC Fylde, securing promotion to the National League, finished runner-up behind Paul Blackett for the top goalscorer award and was awarded both player of the season and young player of the season.

In August 2026, he was subject to numerous bids from EFL clubs, with AFC Fylde rejecting an offer of £500,000 from York City.

=== Peterborough United ===
On 26 August 2026, Ormerod signed for EFL League One club Peterborough United on a long term contract for an undisclosed fee believed to be around £600,000.

== Career statistics ==
As of match played 7 November 2026

Appearances and goals by club, season and competition
Club	Season	League			FA Cup		EFL Cup		Other		Total	
Club	Season	Division	Apps	Goals	Apps	Goals	Apps	Goals	Apps	Goals	Apps	Goals
AFC Fylde	2023–24	National League	26	7	0	0	—		3 (Note: One appearance, one goal in Lancashire Senior Cup; two appearances in FA Trophy)	1	29	8
AFC Fylde	2024–25	National League	33	1	1	0	—		1 (Note: Appearance(s) in FA Trophy)	0	35	1
AFC Fylde	2025–26	National League North	41	28	2	1	—		3	3	46	32
AFC Fylde	2026–27	National League	3	2	0	0	—		0	0	3	2
AFC Fylde	Total		103	38	3	1	—		7	4	113	43
Burscough (loan)	2023–24	NWCFL Premier Division	0	0	—		—		1 (Note: Appearance in Liverpool Senior Cup)	0	1	0
Chorley (loan)	2024–25	National League North	5	3	—		—		0	0	5	3
Peterborough United	2026–27	League One	11	0	1	0	2	2	2 (Note: Appearances in EFL Trophy)	0	16	2
Career total			119	41	4	1	2	2	9	4	134	48
