= Josh Feeney =

English footballer (born 2005)

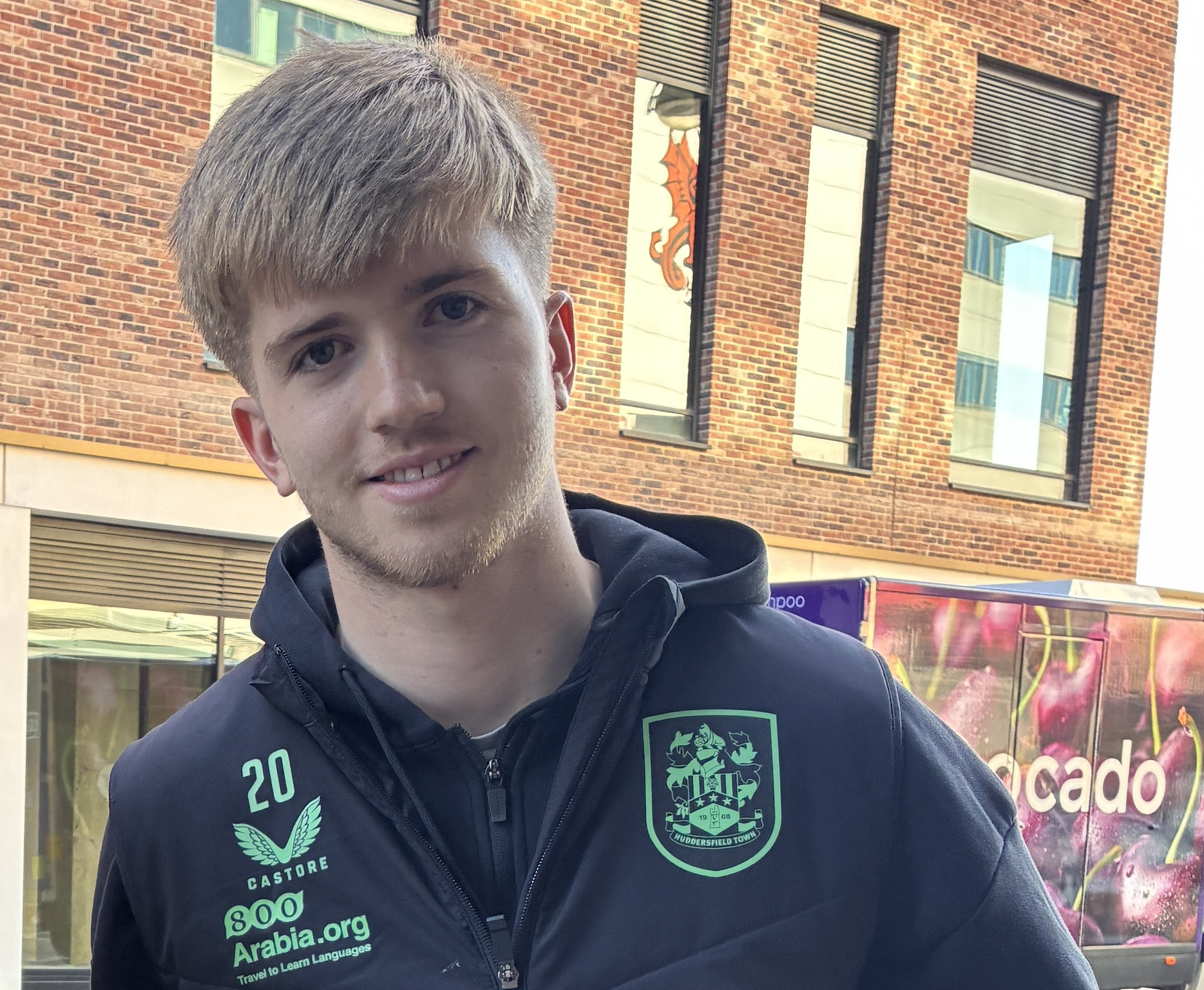

Personal information
- Full name: Joshua Philip Feeney
- Date of birth: 6 May 2005 (age 21)
- Place of birth: Blackpool, England
- Height: 1.93 m (6 ft 4 in)
- Position: Centre-back

Team information
- Current team: Peterborough United (on loan from Aston Villa)
- Number: 12

Youth career
- –2021: Fleetwood Town
- 2021–2024: Aston Villa

Senior career*
Years	Team	Apps	(Gls)
2024–	Aston Villa	0	(0)
2024	→ Real Unión (loan)	8	(0)
2024–2025	→ Shrewsbury Town (loan)	37	(1)
2025–2026	→ Huddersfield Town (loan)	24	(0)
2026–	→ Peterborough United (loan)	6	(0)

International career^{‡}
2021	England U16	2	(1)
2021–2022	England U17	10	(1)
2022–2023	England U18	4	(0)
2026–	Scotland U21	2	(0)
- * Club domestic league appearances and goals as of 17:20, 10 October 2026 (UTC) ‡ National team caps and goals as of 09:26, 14 October 2026 (UTC)

Joshua Philip Feeney (born 6 May 2005) is a professional footballer who plays as a centre-back for EFL League One side Peterborough United on loan from Premier League club Aston Villa. Born in England, he was England youth international, but has since represented the Scotland under-21 squad.

== Early life ==
Feeney's father Charlie was a football coach in Poulton in Lancashire, and Josh played football there from the age of five.

== Career ==
Feeney joined Fleetwood Town at 12 years old. Feeney then joined Aston Villa from Fleetwood Town in July 2021 for an undisclosed fee.

In the summer of 2022 he signed his first professional contract with Aston Villa. During the 2022–23 season Feeney was included in Aston Villa first-team training and made his first match day squad on the opening week of the Premier League season, being named as a substitute against Brentford in August 2022. In July 2023, Feeney signed a contract extension with Aston Villa.

On 1 February 2024, Feeney signed for Primera Federación club Real Unión, a sister club of Aston Villa managed by former Aston Villa U21 manager Iñigo Idiakez, on loan until the end of the season. Feeney made his debut on 10 February in a 2–1 defeat to Gimnàstic de Tarragona.

In 2024, Feeney was promoted to the Aston Villa senior team, and on 17 July 2024, played for Aston Villa during a 3–0 friendly win against EFL League Two club Walsall.

On 6 August 2024, Feeney joined League One side Shrewsbury Town on a season-long loan deal, joining up with fellow Villa youngster Tommi O'Reilly. Feeney returned to Aston Villa a few weeks later, after suffering a hamstring injury in training before making his Shrewsbury debut. However, the loan was not cancelled and Feeney was expected to return to Shrewsbury Town training once completing his rehabilitation with Villa.

On 16 June 2025, Feeney returned to League One, joining Huddersfield Town on a season-long loan deal. On 9 August 2025, Feeney made his Huddersfield debut as a second-half substitute in a 2–0 league victory over Reading.

On 31 August 2026, Feeney joined Peterborough United on a season long loan.

== International career ==
Feeney is eligible to play for England by being born there, and Scotland via his Scottish father. Feeney was called up for England and Scotland at youth level. In 2021 he began to captain England U16s. In September 2022 he won his first cap for the England U18 team.

He was selected for the Scotland U21 squad in September 2026. He made his debut for Scotland U21 on 30 September 2026, in a 5–2 2027 UEFA European Under-21 Championship qualification victory over Azerbaijan.

== Career statistics ==
=== Club ===
As of match played 10 October 2026

Appearances and goals by club, season and competition
Club	Season	League			FA Cup		League Cup		Continental		Other		Total	
Club	Season	Division	Apps	Goals	Apps	Goals	Apps	Goals	Apps	Goals	Apps	Goals	Apps	Goals
Aston Villa	2021–22	Premier League	0	0	0	0	0	0	—		2 (Note: Appearances in the EFL Trophy)	0	2	0
Aston Villa	2022–23	Premier League	0	0	0	0	0	0	—		2	0	2	0
Aston Villa	2023–24	Premier League	0	0	0	0	0	0	0	0	1	0	1	0
Aston Villa	2024–25	Premier League	0	0	0	0	0	0	0	0	0	0	0	0
Aston Villa	2025–26	Premier League	0	0	0	0	0	0	0	0	0	0	0	0
Aston Villa	2026–27	Premier League	0	0	0	0	0	0	0	0	1	0	1	0
Aston Villa	Total		0	0	0	0	0	0	0	0	6	0	6	0
Real Unión (loan)	2023–24	Primera Federación	8	0	—		—		—		0	0	8	0
Shrewsbury Town (loan)	2024–25	EFL League One	37	1	1	0	0	0	—		1	0	39	1
Huddersfield Town (loan)	2025–26	EFL League One	24	0	1	0	2	0	—		4	1	31	1
Peterborough United (loan)	2026–27	EFL League One	6	0	0	0	1	0	—		1	0	8	0
Career total			75	1	2	0	3	0	0	0	12	1	92	2
