= Harry Leonard (footballer, born 2003) =

English footballer

Personal information
- Full name: Harry Paul Leonard
- Date of birth: 12 September 2003 (age 23)
- Place of birth: Rochdale, England
- Height: 1.85 m (6 ft 1 in)
- Position: Forward

Team information
- Current team: Peterborough United
- Number: 9

Youth career
- 2013–2023: Blackburn Rovers

Senior career*
Years	Team	Apps	(Gls)
2023–2025	Blackburn Rovers	32	(4)
2025–	Peterborough United	52	(20)
- * Club domestic league appearances and goals as of 17:03, 21 November 2026 (BST)

Harry Paul Leonard (born 12 September 2003) is an English professional footballer who plays as a forward for EFL League One club Peterborough United.

== Career ==
=== Blackburn Rovers ===
A youth product of Blackburn Rovers since the age of 9, Leonard signed his first professional contract with the club on 8 December 2021 until 2025. He worked his way up through their youth categories, and after a prolific stint with their U23s in 2022 started training with the senior team in January 2023. On 10 April 2023, Leonard made his debut in the EFL Championship during a 2–2 draw with Huddersfield Town.

On 5 August 2023, Leonard scored his first professional goal in a 2–1 win over West Bromwich Albion on the opening day of the 2023–24 season. He went on to score two further league goals, as well as a goal in a 5–3 FA Cup victory over Cambridge United, bringing his total to four across all competitions.

In January 2024, Leonard suffered a back fracture in training, ruling him out for a significant period. He later sustained a dislocated shoulder at the start of pre-season ahead of the 2024–25 campaign, which kept him sidelined for seven to eight weeks. On 6 November, Leonard returned from injury in a 2–0 defeat to Stoke City. Leonard managed to make nine more appearances for Rovers, scoring once with a 90th-minute equaliser in a 2–2 draw against Sunderland.

Leonard was confirmed to be unavailable for Rovers’ pre-season training camp in Spain ahead of the 2025–26 season, as he continued to build up his fitness following another injury layoff.

=== Peterborough United ===
On 1 September 2025, Leonard signed for EFL League One side Peterborough United for an undisclosed fee on a four-year deal with an option for a fifth. On 1 November, Leonard scored his first goal for the club in a 1–0 FA Cup win over Cardiff City. Just over a week later, on 9 November, he scored his first two league goals in a 5–0 victory against AFC Wimbledon.

== Playing style ==
Leonard is a marksman with an eye for goal, intricate movement and hold-up play. He is skilled at holding possession and playing with his back towards the goal.

== Career statistics ==
As of match played 28 August 2026

Appearances and goals by club, season and competition
Club	Season	League			FA Cup		League Cup		Other		Total	
Club	Season	Division	Apps	Goals	Apps	Goals	Apps	Goals	Apps	Goals	Apps	Goals
Blackburn Rovers	2022–23	Championship	4	0	0	0	0	0	0	0	4	0
Blackburn Rovers	2023–24	Championship	19	3	1	1	2	0	0	0	22	4
Blackburn Rovers	2024–25	Championship	9	1	1	0	0	0	0	0	10	1
Blackburn Rovers	Total		32	4	2	1	2	0	0	0	36	5
Peterborough United	2025–26	League One	37	16	2	1	0	0	3 (Note: Appearance in EFL Trophy.)	0	42	17
Peterborough United	2026–27	League One	2	1	0	0	2	3	0	0	4	4
Peterborough United	Total		39	17	2	1	2	3	3	0	46	21
Career total			71	21	4	2	4	3	3	0	82	26
