= Collin Andeng-Ndi =

Italian footballer

Personal information
- Full name: Collin Christin Andeng-Ndi
- Date of birth: 1 August 2003 (age 23)
- Place of birth: Cuneo, Italy
- Height: 1.83 m (6 ft 0 in)
- Position: Goalkeeper

Team information
- Current team: Peterborough United
- Number: 23

Youth career
- –2020: Basildon United
- 2020–2021: Southend United

Senior career*
Years	Team	Apps	(Gls)
2021–2026	Southend United	115	(0)
2026–	Peterborough United	0	(0)
- * Club domestic league appearances and goals as of 17:50, 25 June 2026 (UTC)

Collin Christin Andeng-Ndi (born 1 August 2003) is an Italian professional footballer who plays as a Goalkeeper for EFL League One club Peterborough United.

== Career ==
Born in Cuneo, Italy, Andeng-Ndi moved to the UK aged 14 where he attended school in Basildon.

=== Southend United ===
Andeng-Ndi started his youth career at Basildon United before moving to Southend United signing a professional contract in 2021.

Andeng-Ndi made over 115 appearances for the Essex side including saving two penalties in winning the 2025–26 FA Trophy.

=== Peterborough United ===
On 25 June 2026, Andeng-Ndi signed for EFL League One side Peterborough United on a two year deal for an undisclosed fee with an option for a third.

== Honours ==
Southend United

- 2025–26 FA Trophy
