= Bolu Shofowoke =

English footballer (born 2008)

Personal information
- Full name: Boluwatife Samuel Shofowoke
- Date of birth: 15 October 2008 (age 18)
- Place of birth: Hackney, England
- Position: Forward

Team information
- Current team: Peterborough United
- Number: 19

Youth career
- –2025: Peterborough United

Senior career*
Years	Team	Apps	(Gls)
2025–	Peterborough United	12	(0)
- * Club domestic league appearances and goals as of 17:25, 10 October 2026 (BST)

Boluwatife Samuel Shofowoke (born 15 October 2008) is an English born Nigerian professional footballer who plays as a forward for EFL League One club Peterborough United.

== Club career ==
=== Early and personal life ===
Shofowoke was born in the London Borough of Hackney but moved north and attended Murray Park School in Derby, where he received prizes for his sporting achievements within the youth academy of Peterborough United, which included reaching the final of the U16 PDL Cup, in which Peterborough lost 3–1 to Wigan Athletic.

Upon receiving his scholarship from Peterborough in the summer of 2024, Shofowoke began receiving regular minutes for the U18s, scoring multiple goals including a hat-trick in a 4–2 victory versus Swindon Town. He will sign a professional contract with the club after his 17th birthday in October 2025. Shofowoke was part of the squad which won the 2025 U-18 PDL Cup over Sheffield United.

=== Peterborough United ===
Shofowoke was first included in a senior matchday squad after fellow striker Bradley Ihionvien had fallen out of favour with manager Darren Ferguson. He made his debut coming on as a late substitute for Malik Mothersille in a 1–1 draw with Bolton Wanderers.

== Career statistics ==
As of match played 11 April 2026

Appearances and goals by club, season and competition
Club	Season	League			FA Cup		EFL Cup		Other		Total	
Club	Season	Division	Apps	Goals	Apps	Goals	Apps	Goals	Apps	Goals	Apps	Goals
Peterborough United	2024–25	League One	1	0	0	0	0	0	0	0	1	0
Peterborough United	2025–26	League One	3	0	0	0	1	0	0	0	4	0
Career total			4	0	0	0	1	0	0	0	5	0
