= Peterborough United F.C. =

Association football club in England

Peterborough United
- Full name: Peterborough United Football Club
- Nickname: The Posh
- Founded: 17 May 1934; 92 years ago
- Ground: London Road
- Capacity: 13,512
- Owner(s): Darragh MacAnthony (75%), Gary Graham & Greg Barr (20%), IRC Investments Limited (5%)
- Chairman: Darragh MacAnthony
- Manager: Robbie Savage
- League: EFL League One
- 2025–26: EFL League One, 18th of 24
- Website: theposh.com
Home colours	Away colours	Third colours

Peterborough United Football Club is a professional association football club based in Peterborough, Cambridgeshire, England. They have spent their entire history at London Road and are nicknamed "The Posh". The team competes in League One, the third level of the English football league system.

Peterborough United formed in 1934 and joined the Midland League. Having won the Midland League title for five seasons in a row from 1955 to 1959, they were elected into the Football League in 1960. Peterborough immediately won the Fourth Division title in 1960–61, scoring a Football League record 134 goals. Relegated in 1968, they won another Fourth Division title in 1973–74, though suffered a further relegation in 1979. Peterborough were promoted back into the Third Division at the end of the 1990–91 season and reached the second tier with victory in the 1992 play-off final. However, they returned to the fourth tier with relegations in 1994 and 1997.

Peterborough won the Third Division play-offs in 2000 under the stewardship of Barry Fry, though were relegated in 2005. They secured a place in the Championship after manager Darren Ferguson led them to consecutive promotions in 2007–08 and 2008–09 and spent three of the next four seasons in the second tier, winning a play-off final in 2011 after relegation the previous year. They were relegated back into League One in 2013, though went on to win the Football League Trophy in 2014. In the 2020–21 season, Peterborough were promoted back to the Championship, though were relegated back into League One the following season. Peterborough later became the first team to go back-to-back in the EFL Trophy, winning in 2023–24 and 2024–25.

Peterborough have long-standing rivalries with nearby clubs Cambridge United and Northampton Town, the former with whom they contest the Cambridgeshire derby and the latter the Nene derby, named after the river which runs through both settlements.

== History ==
=== 1934–1990 ===
Peterborough United formed in 1934 at Peterborough's Angel Hotel to provide a replacement for Peterborough & Fletton United, who had folded two years previously. Peterborough's application to join the Midland League was welcomed by the league, however, the representatives from the club did not have the money to pay for the security deposit, entry fee and subscription. Grantham Town loaned the money to The Posh who began selling shares to raise funds.

4,033 fans attended The Posh's first league match which ended in a 4–0 victory over Gainsborough Trinity. William Rigby scored the team's first goal. They won the Midland League on six occasions, including five seasons in a row from 1956 to 1960. The Posh were elected to The Football League for the beginning of the 1960–61 season, winning Division Four.

Following the Fourth Division Championship success in 1960–61, The Posh spent seven seasons in the 3rd Division. They reached the quarter-finals of the 1964–65 FA Cup, beating Arsenal and Swansea Town along the way before going out to Chelsea. They were relegated back to the 4th Division for financial irregularities in the summer of 1968. The club took six seasons to return to Division 3, winning the 4th Division championship.

In 1977–78 the club threatened to go one better until they narrowly missed out on promotion to Division 2 when they drew the last game of the season at champions Wrexham (0–0) when a win was needed to go up. The game was notable for the fact that over 2,000 Preston North End fans travelled to Wrexham to watch the game and cheer on the home side – Preston were the club who went up because Peterborough did not win. The Wrexham draw cast a long shadow over the club and it fell into a long decline. Relegation followed in 1979 and Posh subsequently spent 12 years back in the 4th division. The 1980s was a long story of mismanagement and false dawns, punctuated by the odd cup run. March 1984 marked the arrival of striker Errington Kelly on loan; after scoring seven goals in eleven appearances, he was made permanent, and went on to have over 100 appearances for Peterborough over five seasons.

=== 1991–2000 ===
In January 1991, Chris Turner, who had played in the 1974 Fourth Division championship team took over as manager and the team embarked on a run of 13 unbeaten games that propelled them into the top four. Six players were signed on transfer deadline day, which at the time was a record for the number of players signed by one club on a single day. On the final day of the season, Posh travelled to Chesterfield needing a win to seal promotion. Despite going two goals down in the first ten minutes, the team rallied and drew level with goals from David Robinson and George Berry. However, Posh's closest rivals, Blackpool lost at Walsall and promotion was achieved.

Chart of table positions for Peterborough since joining the Football League.

The following season arguably remains the most successful in the club's history. After an inconsistent start the team hit form during the autumn when they knocked Wimbledon and Newcastle United out of the League Cup. The reward was a home tie with a Liverpool team containing Bruce Grobbelaar, Jan Mølby, Steve McManaman, Dean Saunders and Mark Wright. Garry Kimble scored the only goal after 19 minutes prompting wild celebrations and a place in the quarter-finals. In the league, the team went from strength to strength and surged up the table. Middlesbrough ended the League Cup run after a replay and there was further disappointment when the team missed out on a trip to Wembley in the Football League Trophy when they lost to Stoke City over two legs in the area final.

Progress continued in the league and a play-off place was clinched on the last day of the season despite a 1–0 defeat to champions Brentford. The following week, Huddersfield Town came to London Road for the first leg of the Semi-final. Captain Mick Halsall's last minute equaliser levelled the score at 2–2. Three days later, the supporters travelled north more in hope than expectation but they were rewarded when the team came from a goal down to win 2–1 with Worrell Sterling and Steve Cooper scoring the goals. On 24 May 1992, Peterborough United played at Wembley for the first time, against Stockport County in the Third Division playoff final. With Posh winning 2–1 and gaining promotion to the new First division. They played in Football League Division One between 1992 and 1994 and finished 10th, their highest-ever league finish, in 1992–93 season.

=== 2001–2010 ===
During the 2005–06 season the club had three managers: Team owner Barry Fry returned to management following former England international Mark Wright's sacking in January 2006. Wright's assistant Steve Bleasdale was then appointed acting manager, but resigned in April. Keith Alexander joined as manager from Lincoln City for 2006–07 but was sacked in January 2007 after a run of poor form and was replaced by Darren Ferguson. He led the club to back-to-back promotions from League Two to the Championship in his two full seasons in charge. By November 2009 Posh were bottom of the Championship and Ferguson left the club, to be replaced by Mark Cooper. In February 2010, after only 13 games in charge, Cooper also left the club and Jim Gannon was appointed in his place. Following confirmation of relegation from the Championship after a 2–2 draw at Barnsley, Gannon was replaced by Gary Johnson.

=== 2011–2020 ===
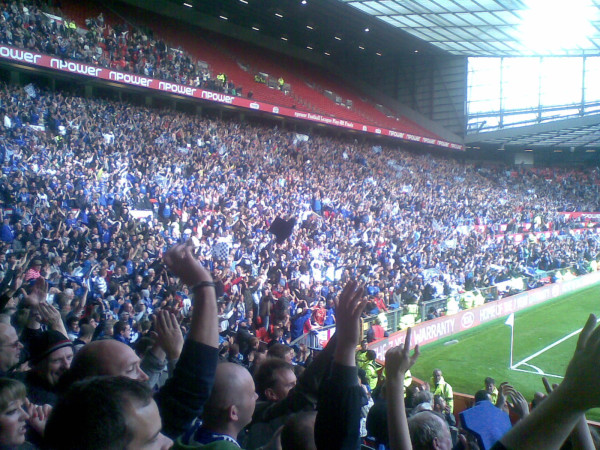
Peterborough United fans at Old Trafford in 2011

Gary Johnson left the club on 10 January 2011 due to policy disagreement. Two days after Johnson's departure, Darren Ferguson returned to the club on a four-and-a-half-year contract. Peterborough finally finished 4th in 2010–11 with one of the worst defensive records in the third tier, conceding 75 goals, but scoring 106; the most for anybody in the Football League that season. Peterborough beat Milton Keynes Dons in the play-off semi-finals. They defeated Huddersfield Town in the final with a 3–0 victory, and gained promotion back to the Championship.

Darren Ferguson led the team to safety in its first season back in the Championship, leading to a finish in 18th. However, the Posh were relegated back the following season, after losing to Crystal Palace 3–2 on 4 May 2013, the final match of the season. On 30 March 2014, the Posh won the Football League Trophy after defeating Chesterfield in the final at Wembley Stadium. Darren Ferguson ended his time as Peterborough United manager on 21 February 2015, following a 3–0 defeat at Milton Keynes Dons.

=== 2021–Present ===
On 1 May 2021, Peterborough were promoted back to the Championship after an 8-year stay in League One after coming back from 3–0 down to draw 3–3 against rivals Lincoln City following a 96th-minute penalty by Jonson Clarke-Harris. On 20 February 2022, Darren Ferguson left Peterborough United for the third time, after offering his resignation to club co-owner Darragh MacAnthony. Ferguson left the club in the relegation zone of the Championship, five points from safety. At the end of the 2021–22 season, Peterborough were relegated back to League One. In the 2022–23 season, Peterborough reached the League One play-offs, but lost in the semi-finals to Sheffield Wednesday. Peterborough won the EFL Trophy for the second time in the 2023–24 season, defeating Wycombe Wanderers 2–1 in the final. They became the first team to retain the trophy the following season by beating Birmingham City 2–0 in the 2025 final.

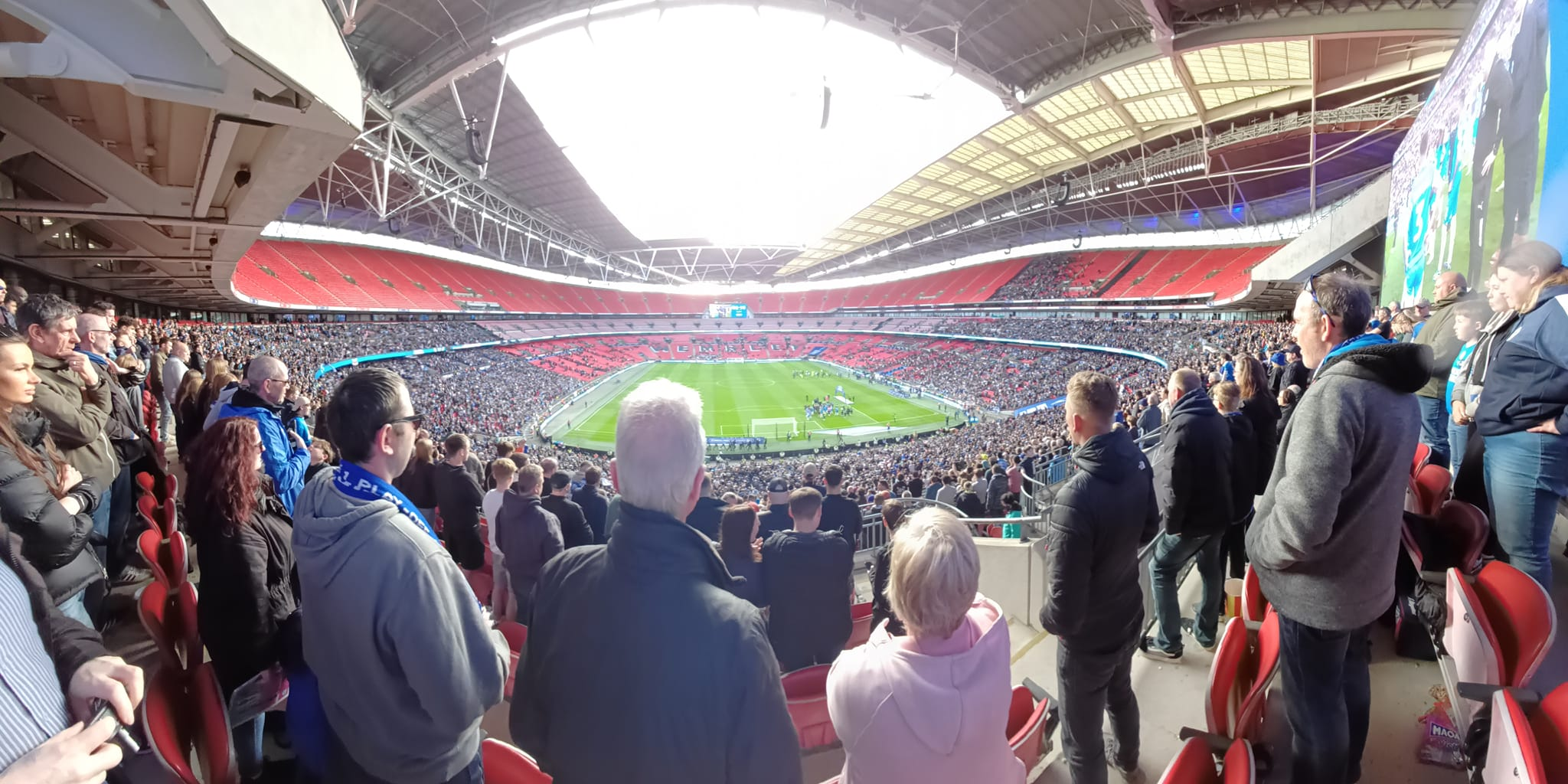
Panorama of Peterborough United Fans at Wembley in 2024, having just won the EFL Trophy against Wycombe Wanderers.

The following season started poorly for Peterborough, and after a 2–1 defeat to Blackpool left Posh bottom of the League One table, the club sacked manager Darren Ferguson, ending his fourth stint as manager of the club on 25 October. He was replaced by former Notts County and Swansea City boss Luke Williams on 29 October on a contract until 2028. Williams only lasted until 19 September 2026 when he was sacked after a 2–0 defeat by Doncaster Rovers.

== Nickname ==
Peterborough United are nicknamed "The Posh", a moniker coined in 1921, after Pat Tirrell, manager of Fletton United, was reported to say he was "Looking for posh players for a posh new team". When Fletton United looked to join the Southern League in 1923 they added Peterborough to their name to form Peterborough & Fletton United, in an attempt to gain the backing of businesses in Peterborough. Peterborough & Fletton United went bankrupt in October 1932 so the current club is the third to be known as The Posh. However, the term "posh" was used as a derogatory term for the club by the press. A pub on London Road, Peterborough, founded in 1932 and originally named The Bridge, was renamed Port Out Starboard Home (POSH) in the 1970s and demolished in the 1990s.

In 2002 Victoria Beckham filed a counter-claim with the UK Patent Office over the club's application to register their nickname of "Posh" for use on merchandise. The former Spice Girl, who was known in the group as "Posh Spice", claimed the "nickname 'Posh' has become synonymous with her on a worldwide basis". She was unsuccessful in her suit.

== Stadium ==
Since their formation, Peterborough United have played their home games at London Road. The stand behind the London Road End is terraced, while the Moy's End is a rebuilt all-seater stand, now known as the GH Display Stand. A 20,000 all-seater stadium to replace London Road has been proposed. The record attendance at the stadium is 30,096, achieved on 20 February 1965 in an FA Cup fifth-round game against Swansea Town.

The ground was renamed as the ABAX Stadium in November 2014 as part of a five-year sponsorship deal with Norwegian company ABAX. In June 2019, the ground was renamed the "Weston Homes Stadium" as a ten-year sponsorship deal, the largest in the club's history, between the football club and the British property developer company.

== Rivalries ==
Cambridge United

Cambridge United are one of Peterborough's two main rivalries, being the only other professional football club based in the county of Cambridgeshire. The teams play each other in the Cambridgeshire derby considering each to be their main rival according to the Football Fans Census of 2003.

Like other English football rivalries, the Cambridgeshire derby has experienced fan trouble. A smoke grenade was set off within a pub prior to the side's EFL Trophy match in 2017 and trouble marred the first league meeting between the two sides in over 20 years in October 2022, with vandalism and tragedy chanting being among the incidents.

Northampton Town

Northampton Town is the other of Peterborough's two main rivalries and the club's traditional rival, dating back to when the City of Peterborough was part of Northamptonshire. The teams play each other in the Nene derby. This has also been a reciprocated rivalry, as noted in a 2019 study called ‘The League of Love And Hate’, with both sets of fans considering each other as their main rival.

Historically the Nene derby has experienced fan violence, most notably the April 1974 "Battle of Abington Park", when approximately 500 fans clashed before, during and after a derby.

MK Dons

More recently, Peterborough fans have begun to view the MK Dons as rivals, partly due to the geographic location, but also due to battling with the MK Dons for promotion from League Two and League One in Darren Ferguson's first two full seasons.

Huddersfield Town

Ever since 1992 there has also been animosity between Peterborough United and Huddersfield Town, with Chris Turner's Peterborough progressing to the final and later on winning the play-offs in the 1991–92 Football League Third Division, they progressed past Huddersfield winning 4–3 on aggregate in the playoff semi finals. This rivalry further grew in 2011 with Peterborough winning against Huddersfield in the 2010–11 League One play-off final 3–0, and in the 2012–13 Championship season Huddersfield relegated Peterborough from the championship on the last day of the season with them drawing 2–2 with Barnsley, and with Peterborough losing 3–2 against Crystal Palace, Huddersfield's draw with Barnsley, with both sides willing to see the game out as a draw, caused the latter to leapfrog Peterborough and send them down to League One.

Lincoln City

Peterborough also have shown a certain enmity towards Lincoln City as the city of Lincoln is only fifty miles directly up the A15 from Peterborough and also some southern parts of Lincolnshire are actually geographically closer to Peterborough rather than Lincoln itself . This rivalry grew on 1 May 2021, as Peterborough United came back from 3–0 down to draw 3–3 meaning they secured automatic promotion to the Championship, denying Lincoln a chance at finishing second and forcing the Lincolnshire club to settle for a play-off place.

Pride of Anglia

Many fans consider Peterborough to be a part of the Pride of Anglia derby, contested between the professional clubs based in Cambridgeshire, Norfolk, Suffolk and sometimes Essex. Matches against these teams often draw large crowds with Posh's highest home attendance of the 2019–20 season coming against Ipswich Town with 10,071 fans.

== Players ==
=== Current squad ===
As of 22 November 2026

Note: Flags indicate national team as defined under FIFA eligibility rules; some limited exceptions apply. Players may hold more than one non-FIFA nationality.

No.	Pos.	Nation	Player
1	GK	ENG	Alex Bass
2	DF	NIR	Carl Johnston (vice-captain)
3	DF	IRL	Evan Weir
4	MF	IRL	Liam Kelly
5	DF	ENG	Sam Hughes (captain)
6	DF	IRL	Tom O'Connor
7	MF	ENG	Harrison Jones
8	MF	ENG	Brandon Khela
9	FW	ENG	Harry Leonard
10	FW	ENG	Ethan Williams
11	FW	ENG	Owura Edwards
12	DF	SCO	Josh Feeney (on loan from Aston Villa)
14	DF	ENG	Harley Mills
16	MF	ENG	Ben Woods
17	FW	ZIM	Vernon Masara
18	DF	BRA	Lucca Mendonça
19	FW	NGR	Bolu Shofowoke

No.	Pos.	Nation	Player
20	MF	NIR	Chris Conn-Clarke
21	MF	UKR	Patryk Sykut
23	GK	ITA	Collin Andeng-Ndi
24	FW	ENG	Declan Frith
26	DF	IRL	David Okagbue
27	FW	ENG	Danny Ormerod
28	MF	NZL	Matt Garbett
31	GK	ENG	Bastian Smith
33	DF	ENG	James Dornelly
34	FW	ENG	Ejiro Abbey
35	MF	SUI	Eddie Fox
36	DF	ENG	Noah Freeman
38	DF	ENG	Oliver Arber
39	DF	ENG	Nathaniel Joseph
40	FW	ENG	Kurtis Simmons
45	MF	WAL	Harry Ashfield
—	DF	ENG	Rio Adebisi
—	MF	WAL	Joe Andrews
—	MF	ENG	Donay O'Brien-Brady

=== Out on loan ===
Note: Flags indicate national team as defined under FIFA eligibility rules; some limited exceptions apply. Players may hold more than one non-FIFA nationality.

No.	Pos.	Nation	Player
15	DF	WAL	George Nevett (at Tranmere Rovers until 30 June 2027)
29	FW	SLE	David Kamara (at Tranmere Rovers until 30 June 2027)
—	MF	GRE	Klaidi Lolos (at Rotherham United until 30 June 2027)
—	FW	ENG	Pemi Aderoju (at Crawley Town until 30 June 2027)
—	FW	ENG	Bradley Ihionvien (at Colchester United until 30 June 2027)

=== Notable former players ===
For a list of notable Peterborough United players in sortable-table format see List of Peterborough United F.C. players.

== Club officials ==
As of 16 October 2026

=== Boardroom ===
- Chairman: Darragh MacAnthony
- Chief Executive Officer: Dawn Gore
- Director of Football: Barry Fry
- Directors: Liz Elsom, Iain Crawford, Dawn Gore, Alex Harris, Gary Graham, Greg Barr
- Head Of Operations: Martyn Kelsey
- Commercial Director: Alex Harris
- Club Patron: Bob Symns

=== First team ===
- Manager: Robbie Savage (Wales)
- Assistant manager: Dan Robinson (England)
- First team coach: Ryan Semple (England)
- First team coach: Craig Mackail-Smith (Scotland)
- Goalkeeping coach: Harry Hogg (England)
- Head of sports science: Taewoong Kim (South Korea)
- First Team Analyst: Daniel Hutchings (England)
- Physio: John Adediran (England)
- Sports Therapist: Kotryna Stoknaite (Lithuania)
- Kit Manager: Derek Fox (England)
- Club Doctor: Dr Cosmas P Nnochiri

=== Youth team ===
- Under 21s Manager: Sam Gaughran (England)
- Senior Professional Phase Lead Coach and Under 21s Assistant Manager: Vacant
- Under 18s Manager: Hugh Alban-Jones (England)
- Under 18s Assistant Manager: Vacant
- Academy manager: Ben Seymour-Shove
- Professional Player to Coach: Sagi Burton
- Academy Coach: Will Clough
- Lead Academy Analyst: William Riley
- Academy Goalkeeper Coach: Vacant
- Academy Pathway Lead: Frankie Fry
- Youth Lead Phase Coach: Vacant
- Head of academy coaching: Tony Cook
- Head of Player Care: Lewis Elsom

== Managers ==
As of 4th November 2026. Only competitive matches are counted. Periods as caretaker manager are shown in italics

Name	From	To	Record				
Name	From	To	P	W	D	L	Win %
(England) Jock Porter	9 July 1934	10 April 1936	71	25	17	29	35.21%
(England) Fred Taylor	11 April 1936	22 April 1936	6	2	1	3	33.33%
(England) Fred Taylor	23 April 1936	30 June 1937	49	21	6	22	41.82%
(England) H J (Bert) Poulter	1 July 1937	2 June 1938	45	8	15	22	17.78%
(England) Sam Haden	3 June 1938	1 May 1948	179	88	27	64	49.16%
(England) Jack Blood	3 May 1948	4 February 1950	83	37	11	35	44.58%
(England) Jim Smith	05 February 1950	05 March 1950	10	6	4	0	60.00%
(England) Bobby Gurney	6 March 1950	1 April 1952	87	37	25	25	42.53%
The Board	2 April 1952	3 June 1952	9	3	3	3	33.33%
(England) Jack Fairbrother	4 June 1952	9 January 1954	82	41	22	19	50.00%
The Board/Trainer/Captain	10 January 1954	1 February 1954	3	2	0	1	66.67%
(England) George Swindin	2 February 1954	4 July 1958	217	144	44	29	66.36%
(England) Jimmy Hagan	20 August 1958	18 October 1962	202	130	36	36	64.36%
(England) Johnny Anderson	18 October 1962	31 December 1962	12	8	1	3	66.67%
(England) Jack Fairbrother	1 January 1963	15 February 1964	56	17	14	25	30.36%
(England) Johnny Anderson	15 February 1964	21 April 1964	12	7	3	2	58.33%
(England) Gordon Clark	22 April 1964	28 September 1967	173	71	40	62	41.04%
(England) Norman Rigby	28 September 1967	30 November 1967	12	5	2	5	41.67%
(England) Norman Rigby	1 December 1967	8 January 1969	58	22	15	21	37.93%
(England) Jim Iley	8 January 1969	15 September 1972	182	66	47	69	36.26%
Jim Walker	16 September 1972	11 October 1972	7	0	3	4	00.00%
(Republic of Ireland) Noel Cantwell	12 October 1972	10 May 1977	252	105	72	75	41.67%
(England) John Barnwell	10 May 1977	9 November 1978	80	32	30	18	40.00%
(England) Billy Hails	9 November 1978	20 November 1978	3	0	0	3	00.00%
(England) Billy Hails	20 November 1978	5 February 1979	9	1	3	5	11.11%
(England) Billy Hails	9 February 1979	27 February 1979	2	1	0	1	50.00%
(England) Peter Morris	27 February 1979	3 June 1982	178	76	48	54	42.70%
Martin Wilkinson	30 June 1982	28 February 1983	38	14	11	13	33.84%
(England) Bill Harvey	6 November 1982		-	-	-	-	
(England) Bill Harvey	1 March 1983	15 May 1983	16	7	3	6	43.75%
(England) John Wile	16 May 1983	1 November 1986	178	69	55	64	33.15%
(England) Lil Fuccillo	1 November 1986	20 November 1986	4	1	2	1	25.00%
(Republic of Ireland) Noel Cantwell	20 November 1986	12 July 1988	90	38	22	30	42.22%
(England) Mick Jones	12 July 1988	31 August 1989	59	18	15	26	30.51%
(England) Dave Booth	31 August 1989	6 September 1989	1	0	1	0	00.00%
(Republic of Ireland) Mark Lawrenson	6 September 1989	9 November 1990	68	26	24	18	38.24%
(England) Dave Booth	9 November 1990	22 January 1991	17	4	8	5	23.53%
(England) Chris Turner	22 January 1991	18 December 1992	116	56	35	25	48.28%
(England) Lil Fuccillo	18 December 1992	29 December 1993	58	15	19	24	25.86%
(England) Chris Turner	29 December 1993	7 May 1994	28	5	7	14	19.23%
(England) John Still	9 May 1994	24 October 1995	72	21	25	26	29.17%
(England) Mick Halsall	24 October 1995	11 December 1995	9	5	2	2	55.56%
(England) Mick Halsall	12 December 1995	31 May 1996	31	10	6	15	32.26%
(England) Barry Fry	31 May 1996	31 May 2005	488	167	133	188	34.22%
(England) Mark Wright	31 May 2005	24 January 2006	35	12	11	12	34.29%
(England) Steve Bleasdale	24 January 2006	22 April 2006	14	6	1	7	42.86%
(England) Barry Fry	22 April 2006	7 May 2006	3	1	0	2	33.33%
(Saint Lucia) Keith Alexander	30 May 2006	15 January 2007	34	14	7	13	41.18%
(England) Tommy Taylor	15 January 2007	21 January 2007	2	0	0	2	00.00%
(Scotland) Darren Ferguson	21 January 2007	7 November 2009	145	73	32	40	50.34%
(England) Mark Cooper	14 November 2009	1 February 2010	13	1	4	8	7.69%
(England) Jim Gannon	2 February 2010	6 April 2010	14	4	1	9	28.57%
(England) Gary Johnson	6 April 2010	10 January 2011	33	15	4	14	45.45%
(England) David Oldfield	11 January 2011	11 January 2011	1	1	0	0	100.00%
(Scotland) Darren Ferguson	12 January 2011	21 February 2015	222	88	41	93	39.64%
(England) Dave Robertson	21 February 2015	6 September 2015	20	7	5	8	35.00%
(Northern Ireland) Grant McCann	6 September 2015	25 September 2015	2	1	1	0	50.00%
(England) Graham Westley	25 September 2015	23 April 2016	41	18	6	17	43.90%
(Northern Ireland) Grant McCann	23 April 2016	8 May 2016	2	2	0	0	100.00%
(Northern Ireland) Grant McCann	16 May 2016	25 February 2018	104	41	27	36	39.40%
(England) David Oldfield	25 February 2018	28 February 2018	1	1	0	0	100.00%
(Scotland) Steve Evans	28 February 2018	26 January 2019	52	21	15	16	40.38%
(Scotland) Darren Ferguson	26 January 2019	20 February 2022	117	60	24	33	51.28%
(England) Matthew Etherington	20 February 2022	24 February 2022	1	0	0	1	00.00%
(Northern Ireland) Grant McCann	24 February 2022	4 January 2023	48	18	8	22	37.50%
(Scotland) Darren Ferguson	4 January 2023	25 October 2025	143	71	27	45	49.65%
(England) Luke Williams	29 October 2025	19 September 2026	47	17	10	20	36.2%
(England) Ryan Harley	19 September 2026	2 October 2026	2	1	0	1	50.00%
(Wales) Robbie Savage	2 October 2026	present	7	2	2	3	28.6%

== Records and statistics ==
Best performances

- Best FA Cup performance: Quarter-finals, 1964–65
- Best League Cup performance: Semi-finals, 1965–66

Individual records

- Most league appearances: Tommy Robson, 482 (440 starts and 42 as a substitute), 1968–1981
- Most consecutive appearances: Eric Steele, 148 (124 League, 24 Cup), 1973–1977
- Most league goals: Jim Hall, 122, 1967–1975
- Most league goals (incl. non-League): Dennis Emery, 195, 1954–1963
- Most league goals in one season: Terry Bly, 52, 1960–61 (also an all-time Fourth Division record)
- Highest transfer fee received: A fee around £7m (rising to £10m) from Brentford for Ivan Toney, August 2020
- Highest transfer fee paid: A fee exceeding £1.25m to Bristol City for Mo Eisa, June 2019

== Honours ==
League

- Third Division / League One (level 3)
  - Runners-up: 2008–09, 2020–21
  - Play-off winners: 1992, 2011
- Fourth Division / Third Division / League Two (level 4)
  - Champions: 1960–61, 1973–74
  - Runners-up: 1990–91, 2007–08
  - Play-off winners: 2000
- Midland League
  - Champions: 1939–40, 1955–56, 1956–57, 1957–58, 1958–59, 1959–60

Cup

- Football League Trophy / EFL Trophy
  - Winners: 2013–14, 2023–24, 2024–25
