= 2025–26 Plymouth Argyle F.C. season =

English football club season

Plymouth Argyle
2025–26 season
- Owner & Chairman: Simon Hallett
- Head coach: Tom Cleverley
- Stadium: Home Park
- EFL League One: 8th
- FA Cup: First round
- EFL Cup: Second round
- EFL Trophy: Quarter-finals
- Top goalscorer: League: Lorent Tolaj (18); All: Lorent Tolaj (21)
- Highest home attendance: 17,016 (v. Exeter City, EFL League One, 11 April 2026)
- Lowest home attendance: 3,726 (v. Cheltenham Town, EFL Trophy, 2 September 2025)
- Biggest win: 6–2 v. Tottenham Hotspur U21 (H); EFL Trophy, 23 September 2025
- Biggest defeat: 0–4 v. Cardiff City (A); EFL League One, 30 August 2025
| Home colours | Away colours | Third colours |

The 2025–26 season was the 140th season in the history of Plymouth Argyle Football Club and their first season back in League One since the 2022–23 season following relegation from the Championship in the previous season. In addition to the domestic league, the club also participated in the FA Cup, the EFL Cup, and the EFL Trophy.

On 31 May 2025, manager Miron Muslić departed the club for German club Schalke 04, after four months of managing the Greens to fight for safety in the Championship during the previous season. Two weeks later, Tom Cleverley was appointed as the club's new head coach on a three-year contract.

Argyle's season ended up divided into two distinct halves; A sluggish start to the season saw the Pilgrims in the relegation zone at the turn of the year, but a sharp turnaround in form inspired a late play-off challenge. Entering the final game of the season, Plymouth knew they would need to beat Northampton Town, and hope that both Stevenage and Luton Town dropped points in their respective fixtures. Argyle beat Northampton 3–2, but injury time winners for Stevenage and Luton saw Argyle finish eighth, two points outside of the playoff places.

== Squad ==
As of 15 November 2025

| No. | Player | Position | Nationality | Date of birth (age) | Signed from | Since |
Goalkeepers
| 1 | Conor Hazard | GK | (Northern Ireland) | 5 March 1998 (age 28) | (Scotland) Celtic | 2023 |
| 13 | Zak Baker | GK | (England) | 19 November 2004 (age 21) | (England) Plymouth Argyle Academy | 2023 |
| 21 | Luca Ashby-Hammond | GK | (England) | 25 March 2001 (age 25) | (England) Fulham | 2025 |
Defenders
| 2 | Mathias Ross | CB | (Denmark) | 15 January 2001 (age 25) | (Turkey) Galatasaray | 2025 |
| 3 | Jack MacKenzie | LB | (Scotland) | 7 April 2000 (age 26) | (Scotland) Aberdeen | 2025 |
| 5 | Julio Pleguezuelo | CB | (Spain) | 26 January 1997 (age 29) | (Netherlands) Twente | 2023 |
| 6 | Kornél Szűcs | CB | (Hungary) | 24 September 2001 (age 25) | (Hungary) Kecskemét | 2024 |
| 8 | Joe Edwards (captain) | RB | (England) | 31 October 1990 (age 36) | (England) Walsall | 2019 |
| 15 | Alex Mitchell | CB | (England) | 7 October 2001 (age 25) | (England) Charlton Athletic (on loan) | 2025 |
| 22 | Brendan Galloway | LB | (Zimbabwe) | 17 March 1996 (age 30) | (England) Luton Town | 2021 |
| 29 | Matthew Sorinola | LB | (England) | 19 February 2001 (age 25) | (Belgium) Union Saint-Gilloise | 2024 |
Midfielders
| 4 | Brendan Sarpong-Wiredu | CM | (England) | 7 November 1999 (age 27) | (England) Fleetwood Town | 2025 |
| 11 | Bali Mumba | LM | (England) | 8 October 2001 (age 25) | (England) Norwich City | 2023 |
| 14 | Ayman Benarous | CM | (England) | 27 July 2003 (age 23) | (England) Bristol City | 2025 |
| 17 | Caleb Watts | AM | (Australia) | 16 January 2002 (age 24) | (England) Exeter City | 2025 |
| 19 | Malachi Boateng | DM | (England) | 5 July 2002 (age 24) | (Scotland) Heart of Midlothian | 2025 |
| 20 | Law McCabe | CM | (England) | 16 January 2006 (age 20) | (England) Middlesbrough (on loan) | 2025 |
| 23 | Bradley Ibrahim | DM | (England) | 21 October 2004 (age 22) | (Germany) Hertha BSC | 2025 |
| 24 | Caleb Roberts | CM | (England) | 24 October 2005 (age 21) | (England) Plymouth Argyle Academy | 2021 |
| 32 | Joe Ralls | CM | (England) | 12 October 1993 (age 33) | (Wales) Cardiff City | 2025 |
Forwards
| 7 | Jamie Paterson | CF | (England) | 20 December 1991 (age 34) | (England) Coventry City | 2025 |
| 9 | Lorent Tolaj | CF | (Switzerland) | 23 October 2001 (age 25) | (England) Port Vale | 2025 |
| 10 | Xavier Amaechi | RW | (England) | 5 January 2001 (age 25) | (Germany) 1. FC Magdeburg | 2025 |
| 18 | Owen Oseni | CF | (Nigeria) | 7 May 2003 (age 23) | (Scotland) St Mirren | 2025 |
| 27 | Aribim Pepple | CF | (England) | 25 December 2002 (age 23) | (England) Luton Town | 2025 |
| 35 | Owen Dale | RW | (England) | 1 November 1998 (age 28) | (England) Oxford United (on loan) | 2025 |
| 38 | Joe Hatch | CF | (Wales) | 7 September 2006 (age 20) | (England) Plymouth Argyle Academy | 2025 |
| 39 | Tegan Finn | LW | (England) | 17 March 2008 (age 18) | (England) Plymouth Argyle Academy | 2024 |

== Transfers and contracts ==
=== In ===
| Date | Pos. | No. | Player | From | Fee | Ref. |
|---|---|---|---|---|---|---|
| 4 June 2025 | DM | 23 | (England) Bradley Ibrahim | (Germany) Hertha BSC | £250,000 | |
| 27 June 2025 | CF | 18 | (Nigeria) Owen Oseni | (Scotland) St Mirren | £60,000 | |
| 1 July 2025 | LB | 3 | (Scotland) Jack MacKenzie | (Scotland) Aberdeen | Free transfer | |
| 1 July 2025 | AM | 7 | (England) Jamie Paterson | (England) Coventry City | Free transfer | |
| 1 July 2025 | RW | 10 | (England) Xavier Amaechi | (Germany) 1. FC Magdeburg | Free transfer | |
| 1 July 2025 | AM | 17 | (Australia) Caleb Watts | (England) Exeter City | Free transfer | |
| 4 July 2025 | CM | 4 | (England) Brendan Sarpong-Wiredu | (England) Fleetwood Town | £300,000 | |
| 4 July 2025 | CF | 27 | (England) Aribim Pepple | (England) Luton Town | £300,000 | |
| 8 July 2025 | CM | 14 | (England) Ayman Benarous | (England) Bristol City | Free transfer | |
| 23 July 2025 | GK | 21 | (England) Luca Ashby-Hammond | (England) Fulham | Free transfer | |
| 21 August 2025 | CB | 2 | (Denmark) Mathias Ross | (Turkey) Galatasaray | Free transfer | |
| 22 August 2025 | CF | 9 | (Switzerland) Lorent Tolaj | (England) Port Vale | £1,200,000 | |
| 5 November 2025 | CM | 32 | (England) Joe Ralls | (Wales) Cardiff City | Free transfer | |
| 10 January 2026 | LW | 28 | (Republic of Ireland) Ronan Curtis | (England) Port Vale | Undisclosed | |
▼ Spending: £2,110,000

=== Out ===
| Date | Pos. | No. | Player | To | Fee | Ref. |
|---|---|---|---|---|---|---|
| 6 June 2025 | GK | 31 | (England) Daniel Grimshaw | (England) Norwich City | £600,000 | |
| 16 June 2025 | CF | 9 | (Scotland) Ryan Hardie | (Wales) Wrexham | £700,000 | |
| 20 June 2025 | DM | 20 | (England) Adam Randell | (England) Bristol City | £750,000 | |
| 30 June 2025 | DM | 4 | (England) Jordan Houghton | (England) Stevenage | Free transfer | |
| 30 June 2025 | CF | 15 | (Sierra Leone) Mustapha Bundu | (Germany) Hannover 96 | Free transfer | |
| 30 June 2025 | CF | 23 | (New Zealand) Ben Waine | (England) Port Vale | Free transfer | |
| 30 June 2025 | LB | 24 | (England) Saxon Earley | (England) Stevenage | Free transfer | |
| 30 June 2025 | AM | 32 | (Wales) Will Jenkins-Davies | (England) Bath City | Free transfer | |
| 30 June 2025 | CM | 36 | (Wales) Josh Bernard | (Wales) Barry Town United | Free transfer | |
| 5 July 2025 | CB | 40 | (Ukraine) Maksym Talovierov | (England) Stoke City | £1,700,000 | |
| 11 July 2025 | AM | 28 | (Sweden) Rami Al Hajj | (Denmark) Silkeborg | Undisclosed | |
| 24 August 2025 | CB | 44 | (Iceland) Victor Pálsson | (Denmark) Horsens | Free transfer | |
| 15 January 2026 | RB | 11 | (England) Bali Mumba | (England) Huddersfield Town | Undisclosed | |
| 13 February 2026 | CB | 6 | (Hungary) Kornél Szűcs | (Serbia) Vojvodina | £435,000 | |
▲ Income: £4,185,000

=== Loans in ===
| Date | Pos. | No. | Player | From | Date until | Ref. |
|---|---|---|---|---|---|---|
| 18 August 2025 | CB | 15 | (England) Alex Mitchell | (England) Charlton Athletic | End of season | |
| 1 September 2025 | CM | 20 | (England) Law McCabe | (England) Middlesbrough | 5 January 2026 (Note: On 5 January, McCabe returned to his parent club Middlesbrough) | |
| 1 September 2025 | RW | 35 | (England) Owen Dale | (England) Oxford United | End of season | |
| 2 February 2026 | CB | 45 | (Jamaica) Wes Harding | (England) Millwall | End of season | |
| 2 February 2026 | CM | 20 | (England) Herbie Kane | (England) Huddersfield Town | End of season | |

=== Loans out ===
| Date | Pos. | No. | Player | To | Date until | Ref. |
|---|---|---|---|---|---|---|
| 30 June 2025 | LB | 3 | (England) Nathanael Ogbeta | (England) Barnsley | 31 May 2026 | |
| 30 June 2025 | CAM | 30 | (Ghana) Michael Baidoo | (Qatar) Umm Salal | 31 May 2026 | |
| 4 July 2025 | LM | 11 | (England) Callum Wright | (England) Wigan Athletic | 31 May 2026 | |
| 8 August 2025 | CB | 37 | (England) Jack Matthews | (England) Bath City | 1 January 2026 | |
| 1 September 2025 | LW | 25 | (Wales) Freddie Issaka | (England) Bristol Rovers | 6 January 2026 (Note: On 6 January, Issaka's season-long loan at Bristol Rovers was terminated) | |
| 11 September 2025 | CF | 38 | (Wales) Joe Hatch | (England) Taunton Town | 3 November 2025 (Note: On 3 November 2025, Hatch was recalled from his loan at Taunton Town.) | |
| 17 October 2025 | GK | 13 | (Scotland) Zak Baker | (England) Tiverton Town | 15 November 2025 | |
| 16 January 2026 | GK | 13 | (Scotland) Zak Baker | (England) Plymouth Parkway | 30 April 2026 | |
| 23 January 2026 | CF | 38 | (Wales) Joe Hatch | (England) Torquay United | 21 February 2026 | |
| 13 February 2026 | LW | 25 | (Wales) Freddie Issaka | (England) Truro City | 31 May 2026 | |
| 13 February 2026 | CM | 24 | (England) Caleb Roberts | (England) Truro City | 19 March 2026 (Note: On 19 March, Roberts was recalled from his half-season loan at Truro City) | |
| 5 March 2026 | CF | 38 | (Wales) Joe Hatch | (England) Taunton Town | 31 May 2026 | |

=== New contracts ===
| Date | Pos. | No. | Player | Until | Ref. |
|---|---|---|---|---|---|
| 5 June 2025 | CB | 37 | (England) Jack Matthews | Undisclosed (Note: First professional contract.) | |
| 5 June 2025 | CF | 38 | (Wales) Joe Hatch | Undisclosed | |
| 25 August 2025 | LW | 39 | (England) Tegan Finn | 30 June 2028 | |
| 3 January 2026 | CM | 32 | (England) Joe Ralls | 30 June 2026 | |
| 19 March 2026 | CM | 41 | (England) Sebastian Campbell | Undisclosed | |

== Pre-season and friendlies ==
On 16 June 2025, Plymouth announced their pre-season fixtures with a 6-day training camp in Austria. One week later, the opponents for the friendly in Austria were confirmed to be German side Eintracht Braunschweig.

Win Draw Loss Fixtures

| 11 July 2025 Friendly | Eintracht Braunschweig | 1–0 | Plymouth Argyle | St. Johann in Tirol, Austria |
| 17:00 CEST | Ashby-Hammond 31' (o.g.); Marie (yellow card) 46'; Trialist (yellow card) 51'; Trialist (yellow card) 72' | Report | Roberts (yellow card) 72' | Stadium: Koasastadion |

| 16 July 2025 Friendly | Truro City | 2–3 | Plymouth Argyle | Threemilestone, England |
| 19:30 BST | Hasani 36'; Trialist 70' | Report | Dean 45+2' (o.g.); Ibrahim 68'; Watts 83' | Stadium: Truro City Stadium; Attendance: 2,725; Referee: Steve Swan (England) |

| 23 July 2025 Friendly | Torquay United | 0–6 | Plymouth Argyle | Torquay, England |
| 19:30 BST | Dreyer (yellow card) 61' | Report | Amaechi 36', 50'; Pepple 52'; Edwards 68', 78'; Mumba 74' | Stadium: Plainmoor; Attendance: 5,244 (1,546 away); Referee: Steve Swan (England) |

| 26 July 2025 Friendly | Plymouth Argyle | 0–2 | Bristol City | Plymouth, England |
| 15:00 BST | | Report | Riis 26', 38' | Stadium: Home Park; Attendance: 9,704 (1,014 away); Referee: Lee Swabey (England) |

== Competitions ==
=== Overall record ===
| Competition | First match | Last match | Starting round | Final position | Record | | | | | | | |
| Competition | First match | Last match | Starting round | Final position | Pld | W | D | L | GF | GA | GD | Win % |
|---|---|---|---|---|---|---|---|---|---|---|---|---|
| EFL League One | 2 August 2025 | 2 May 2026 | Matchday 1 | TBD | 41 | 19 | 5 | 17 | 64 | 56 | +8 | 46.34 |
| FA Cup | 1 November 2025 | | First round | First round | 1 | 0 | 0 | 1 | 0 | 2 | −2 | 0.00 |
| EFL Cup | 12 August 2025 | 26 August 2025 | First round | Second round | 2 | 1 | 1 | 0 | 4 | 3 | +1 | 50.00 |
| EFL Trophy | 2 September 2025 | 24 February 2026 | Group stage | Quarter-final | 6 | 4 | 0 | 2 | 14 | 8 | +6 | 66.67 |
| Total | | | | | 50 | 24 | 6 | 20 | 82 | 69 | +13 | 48.00 |

Last updated: 28 February 2026
Source: Soccerway

=== EFL League One ===
==== League table ====
| Pos | Team | Pld | W | D | L | GF | GA | GD | Pts | Promotion, qualification or relegation |
|---|---|---|---|---|---|---|---|---|---|---|
| 6 | Stevenage | 46 | 21 | 12 | 13 | 49 | 46 | +3 | 75 | Qualification for League One play-offs |
| 7 | Luton Town | 46 | 21 | 11 | 14 | 68 | 56 | +12 | 74 | |
| 8 | Plymouth Argyle | 46 | 22 | 7 | 17 | 75 | 63 | +12 | 73 | |
| 9 | Huddersfield Town | 46 | 18 | 13 | 15 | 74 | 64 | +10 | 67 | |
| 10 | Mansfield Town | 46 | 16 | 17 | 13 | 62 | 50 | +12 | 65 | |

Source: EFL Official Website
Rules for classification: 1) Points; 2) Goal difference; 3) Number of goals scored; 4) Head-to-head results; 5) Wins; 6) Away goals; 7) Penalty points (sec 9.5); 8) 12-point sending off offences

==== Results summary ====
| Overall | | | | | | | | Home | | | | | | Away | | | | | |
| Pld | W | D | L | GF | GA | GD | Pts | W | D | L | GF | GA | GD | W | D | L | GF | GA | GD |
|---|---|---|---|---|---|---|---|---|---|---|---|---|---|---|---|---|---|---|---|
| 46 | 22 | 7 | 17 | 75 | 63 | +12 | 73 | 10 | 4 | 9 | 33 | 33 | 0 | 12 | 3 | 8 | 42 | 30 | +12 |

Last updated: complete.
Source: Soccerway

==== Results by round ====
| Round | 1 | 2 | 3 | 4 | 5 | 6 | 7 | 8 | 9 | 10 | 11 | 13 | 14 | 12^{1} | 15 | 17 | 18 | 16^{2} | 19 | 20 | 21 | 22 | 23 | 24 | 25 | 27 | 28 | 29 | 30 | 31 | 32 | 33 | 34 | 35 | 36 | 26^{3} | 37 | 38 | 39 | 41 | 42 | 43 | 44 | 40^{4} | 45 | 46 |
|---|---|---|---|---|---|---|---|---|---|---|---|---|---|---|---|---|---|---|---|---|---|---|---|---|---|---|---|---|---|---|---|---|---|---|---|---|---|---|---|---|---|---|---|---|---|---|
| Ground | H | A | A | H | H | A | H | A | H | A | H | H | A | A | A | A | H | H | A | H | A | H | H | A | H | A | H | H | A | H | A | A | H | A | H | A | A | H | H | H | A | H | A | A | H | A |
| Result | L | L | L | L | W | L | W | W | L | W | D | L | L | L | L | W | L | L | W | W | W | L | D | D | W | W | W | D | L | L | W | W | W | L | W | W | D | W | W | L | W | D | W | D | W | W |
| Position | 21 | 23 | 22 | 23 | 19 | 21 | 18 | 17 | 17 | 15 | 15 | 20 | 22 | 22 | 24 | 23 | 23 | 23 | 23 | 21 | 17 | 20 | 21 | 21 | 16 | 14 | 14 | 14 | 14 | 16 | 12 | 12 | 11 | 12 | 10 | 10 | 10 | 10 | 7 | 9 | 7 | 7 | 7 | 8 | 8 | 8 |
| Points | 0 | 0 | 0 | 0 | 3 | 3 | 6 | 9 | 9 | 12 | 13 | 13 | 13 | 13 | 13 | 16 | 16 | 16 | 19 | 22 | 25 | 25 | 26 | 27 | 30 | 33 | 36 | 37 | 37 | 37 | 40 | 43 | 46 | 46 | 49 | 52 | 53 | 56 | 59 | 59 | 62 | 63 | 66 | 67 | 70 | 73 |

Source: EFL
A = Away; H = Home; W = Win; D = Draw; L = Loss; P = Postponed
Notes:
- ^{1} Matchday 12 (v. Mansfield Town) was postponed due to international call-ups.
- ^{2} Matchday 16 (v. Bradford City) was postponed due to international call-ups.
- ^{3} Matchday 26 (v. Wigan Athletic) was postponed due to Wigan's participation in the FA Cup third round.
- ^{4} Matchday 40 (v. Bradford City) was postponed due to international call-ups.

==== Matches ====
The league fixtures were released on 26 June 2025.

Win Draw Loss Fixtures

| 2 August 2025 1 | Plymouth Argyle | 1–3 | Barnsley | Plymouth |
| 15:00 BST | Sarpong-Wiredu (yellow card) 45+4'; Ibrahim (yellow card) 45+4'; Watts 50' | Report | Sarpong-Wiredu 13' (o.g.); Phillips 30'; McGoldrick (yellow card) 35'; Shepherd (yellow card) 45+4' (yellow-red card) 63'; Bland (yellow card) 49'; Russell (yellow card) 70'; Keillor-Dunn 86' | Stadium: Home Park; Attendance: 16,483 (888 away); Referee: Declan Bourne |

| 9 August 2025 2 | Bolton Wanderers | 2–0 | Plymouth Argyle | Bolton |
| 15:00 BST | Johnston (yellow card) 14'; Toal 20'; Sheehan (yellow card) 45+2'; Burstow 60' | Report | Sorinola (yellow card) 55'; Ibrahim (yellow card) 63'; Mumba (yellow card) 87'; Watts (yellow card) 90' | Stadium: Toughsheet Community Stadium; Attendance: 21,570 (1,621 away); Referee: Ross Joyce |

| 16 August 2025 3 | Lincoln City | 3–2 | Plymouth Argyle | Lincoln |
| 15:00 BST | Bayliss 6'; Towler (yellow card) 10'; Collins 59', 65' (pen.); Draper (yellow card) 70'; Street (yellow card) 74'; House (yellow card) 75'; Darikwa (yellow card) 90'; Hamilton (yellow card) 90+5' | Report | Ibrahim (yellow card) 23'; Watts (yellow card) 54'; Sarpong-Wiredu (yellow card) 74' (yellow-red card) 86'; Oseni 78'; Amaechi 80'; Galloway (yellow card) 90+3' | Stadium: Sincil Bank; Attendance: 8,503 (1,094 away); Referee: Carl Brook |

| 19 August 2025 4 | Plymouth Argyle | 0–1 | Leyton Orient | Plymouth |
| 19:45 BST | Benarous (yellow card) 72' | Report | Happe (yellow card) 39'; Koroma 63'; Simkin (yellow card) 70' | Stadium: Home Park; Attendance: 15,422 (420 away); Referee: Ben Speedie |

| 23 August 2025 5 | Plymouth Argyle | 1–0 | Blackpool | Plymouth |
| 15:00 BST | Boateng 48'; Ibrahim (yellow card) 77' | Report | Evans (yellow card) 62'; Coulson (yellow card) 63'; Taylor (yellow card) 90+8' | Stadium: Home Park; Attendance: 15,322 (441 away); Referee: David Rock |

| 30 August 2025 6 | Cardiff City | 4–0 | Plymouth Argyle | Cardiff |
| 12:30 BST | J. Colwill (yellow card) 34'; Wintle 41'; R. Colwill (yellow card) 42', (goal) 50'; Willock 44'; Kpakio (yellow card) 90'; Davies 90+1' | Report | Sorinola (yellow card) 21' | Stadium: Cardiff City Stadium; Attendance: 21,813 (3,000 away); Referee: Scott Oldham |
Note: Fixture was initially scheduled for a 15:00 kick-off, but was moved for live Sky Sports broadcast.

| 6 September 2025 7 | Plymouth Argyle | 4–2 | Stockport County | Plymouth |
| 15:00 BST | Mitchell (yellow card) 8'; Wootton 24' (o.g.); Watts 39'; Ibrahim 48'; Sorinola (yellow card) 62'; Tolaj 75' | Report | Fevrier (yellow card) 35'; Norwood 45+1' (pen.); Wootton 90+5' | Stadium: Home Park; Attendance: 15,719 (628 away); Referee: Neil Hair |

| 13 September 2025 8 | Luton Town | 2–3 | Plymouth Argyle | Luton |
| 15:00 BST | Yates 20' (pen.); Lonwijk (yellow card) 26'; Wells 49' (pen.); Alli (yellow card) 52' | Report | Sorinola 15'; Sarpong-Wiredu (yellow card) 19'; Ibrahim 45+5', 75'; Edwards (red card) 49'; Mumba (yellow card) 76'; Galloway (yellow card) 90+7' | Stadium: Kenilworth Road; Attendance: 11,801 (1,342 away); Referee: Ollie Yates |

| 20 September 2025 9 | Plymouth Argyle | 0–1 | Peterborough United | Plymouth |
| 15:00 BST | Mitchell (yellow card) 18'; Finn (yellow card) 67'; Sorinola (yellow card) 77' | Report | Leonard (penalty missed) 23'; Khela (yellow card) 28'; Morgan 31'; Garbett (yellow card) 76' | Stadium: Home Park; Attendance: 15,994 (536 away); Referee: James Linington |

| 27 September 2025 10 | Burton Albion | 0–4 | Plymouth Argyle | Burton upon Trent |
| 15:00 BST | | Report | Ibrahim (yellow card) 3'; Tolaj 31', 55'; Oseni 45'; Pepple 81' | Stadium: Pirelli Stadium; Attendance: 4,271 (1,600 away); Referee: Tom Reeves |

| 4 October 2025 11 | Plymouth Argyle | 1–1 | Wigan Athletic | Plymouth |
| 15:00 BST | Oseni (yellow card) 31'; Mumba (yellow card) 65'; Tolaj 70' (pen.) | Report | Murray (yellow card) 24', (goal) 82'; Smith (yellow card) 32'; Robinson (yellow card) 42'; Aimson (yellow card) 69'; Sessegnon (yellow card) 78' | Stadium: Home Park; Attendance: 16,062 (431 away); Referee: Ben Atkinson |

| 18 October 2025 13 | Plymouth Argyle | 1–2 | AFC Wimbledon | Plymouth |
| 15:00 BST | Tolaj 6' | Report | Asiimwe (yellow card) 21'; Bauer (yellow card) 28'; Bugiel 44'; Harbottle (yellow card) 46'; Browne 52' | Stadium: Home Park; Attendance: 16,215 (786 away); Referee: Matthew Corlett |

| 23 October 2025 14 | Exeter City | 2–0 | Plymouth Argyle | Exeter |
| 20:00 BST | Cole 18'; Sweeney (yellow card) 28'; Andrew (yellow card) 40'; Higgins 58'; McMillan (yellow card) 76' | Report | Sorinola (yellow card) 78'; Oseni (yellow card) 87' | Stadium: St James Park; Attendance: 8,262 (1,132 away); Referee: Alex Chilowicz |
Note: Fixture was initially scheduled for 25 October, but was moved for live Sky Sports broadcast.

| 28 October 2025 12 | Mansfield Town | 2–0 | Plymouth Argyle | Mansfield |
| 19:45 GMT | Evans 6'; McDonnell (yellow card) 73'; Bowery 84' | Report | Dale (yellow card) 23'; Roberts (yellow card) 87' | Stadium: Field Mill; Attendance: 7,705 (704 away); Referee: Matthew Russell |
Note: Fixture was initially scheduled for 11 October, but was postponed due to international call-ups in the Plymouth squad.

| 8 November 2025 15 | Huddersfield Town | 3–1 | Plymouth Argyle | Huddersfield |
| 15:00 GMT | Feeney (yellow card) 17'; Radulović 45'; Charles 70'; Ashia 85'; Gooch (yellow card) 89' | Report | Dale (yellow card) 6'; Boateng (yellow card) 13'; Szűcs (yellow card) 36'; Ibrahim (yellow card) 54'; Ross (yellow card) 58'; Tolaj 88', (yellow card) 89' | Stadium: Kirklees Stadium; Attendance: 16,235 (1,200 away); Referee: Seb Stockbridge |

| 22 November 2025 17 | Port Vale | 0–1 | Plymouth Argyle | Stoke-on-Trent |
| 12:30 GMT | John (yellow card) 74' | Report | Tolaj 46', (yellow card) 80'; McCabe (yellow card) 65'; Edwards (yellow card) 90+8' | Stadium: Vale Park; Attendance: 7,358 (888 away); Referee: Abigail Byrne |
Note: Fixture was initially scheduled for a 15:00 kick-off, but was moved for live Sky Sports broadcast.

| 29 November 2025 18 | Plymouth Argyle | 0–3 | Northampton Town | Plymouth |
| 15:00 GMT | Ross (yellow card) 45+1'; Tolaj (red card) 65' | Report | Thorniley (yellow card) 5'; Wheatley (yellow card) 45+1'; McCarthy (yellow card) 53'; Eaves 58'; Taylor (yellow card) 69'; List 76'; Willis 80'; Forbes (yellow card) 90+4' | Stadium: Home Park; Attendance: 15,419 (618 away); Referee: Stephen Parkinson |

| 6 December 2025 16 | Plymouth Argyle | 0–1 | Bradford City | Plymouth |
| 12:30 GMT | Boateng (yellow card) 67' | Report | Sarcevic 57' (pen.); Metcalfe (yellow card) 65'; Power (yellow card) 68'; Halliday (yellow card) 90+5' | Stadium: Home Park; Attendance: 14,811 (813 away); Referee: Thomas Parsons |
Note: Fixture was initially scheduled for 15 November, but was postponed due to international call-ups in the Plymouth squad.

| 9 December 2025 19 | Wycombe Wanderers | 0–1 | Plymouth Argyle | High Wycombe |
| 19:45 GMT | Bell (yellow card) 63' | Report | Dale (yellow card) 30'; Boateng (yellow card) 34'; Sorinola (yellow card) 56'; Oseni 61', (yellow card) 63'; Galloway (yellow card) 80'; Szűcs (yellow card) 90+6' | Stadium: Adams Park; Attendance: 4,664 (522 away); Referee: Peter Wright |

| 13 December 2025 20 | Plymouth Argyle | 1–0 | Rotherham United | Plymouth |
| 15:00 GMT | Ralls 42', (yellow card) 65'; Pleguezuelo (yellow card) 55'; Edwards (yellow card) 66' | Report | Spence (yellow card) 18'; Gore (yellow card) 74' | Stadium: Home Park; Attendance: 14,318 (335 away); Referee: David Rock |

| 20 December 2025 21 | Doncaster Rovers | 1–5 | Plymouth Argyle | Doncaster |
| 15:00 GMT | Hanlan 4'; Bailey (yellow card) 62'; Lo-Tutala (yellow card) 72' | Report | Tolaj 11', 23', 73' (pen.); Oseni 22'; Ralls (yellow card) 62'; Mumba (yellow card) 63'; Amaechi 88' | Stadium: Eco-Power Stadium; Attendance: 8,370 (1,000 away); Referee: Ross Joyce |

| 26 December 2025 22 | Plymouth Argyle | 1–4 | Reading | Plymouth |
| 15:00 GMT | Sorinola (yellow card) 4'; Ralls (red card) 12'; Mitchell (yellow card) 65'; Amaechi 68'; Tolaj (penalty missed) 73'; Edwards (yellow card) 73' | Report | Wing 14' (pen.), 18', (yellow card) 23'; Doyle 20'; Yiadom (yellow card) 30'; Dorsett (yellow card) 80'; Marriott 86' | Stadium: Home Park; Attendance: 16,434 (909 away); Referee: James Durkin |

| 29 December 2025 23 | Plymouth Argyle | 1–1 | Wycombe Wanderers | Plymouth |
| 19:45 GMT | Mumba (yellow card) 33'; Pleguezuelo (yellow card) 83'; Pepple 90+4' | Report | Casey 11'; Henderson (yellow card) 44'; Norris (yellow card) 80' | Stadium: Home Park; Attendance: 15,766 (385 away); Referee: Carl Brook |

| 1 January 2026 24 | Stevenage | 1–1 | Plymouth Argyle | Stevenage |
| 15:00 GMT | James-Wildin 53'; Reid (yellow card) 64'; Campbell (yellow card) 90+3' | Report | Boateng 68'; Sorinola (yellow card) 90+4' | Stadium: Broadhall Way; Attendance: 5,042 (1,363 away); Referee: Richard Eley |

| 4 January 2026 25 | Plymouth Argyle | 3–0 | Burton Albion | Plymouth |
| 15:00 GMT | Galloway 21'; Ross 63'; Tolaj (yellow card) 66', (goal) 77' (pen.); Mumba (yellow card) 67' | Report | Lofthouse (yellow card) 79'; Tavares (yellow card) 79'; Akoto (yellow card) 90+7' | Stadium: Home Park; Attendance: 14,662 (257 away); Referee: Ollie Yates |

| 17 January 2026 27 | Peterborough United | 0–1 | Plymouth Argyle | Peterborough |
| 15:00 GMT | O'Connor (yellow card) 4'; Lisbie (yellow card) 51'; Leonard (yellow card) 55'; Garbett (yellow card) 56'; Kioso (yellow card) 58' (yellow-red card) 89'; Collins (yellow card) 67' | Report | Boateng (yellow card) 6'; Pepple 23'; Tolaj (yellow card) 44'; Ross (yellow card) 90'; Mitchell (yellow card) 90+5' | Stadium: London Road Stadium; Attendance: 8,634 (1,234 away); Referee: Ben Atkinson |

| 24 January 2026 28 | Plymouth Argyle | 1–0 | Luton Town | Plymouth |
| 12:30 GMT | Ross (yellow card) 45+1'; Galloway 45+3'; Curtis (yellow card) 54'; Boateng (yellow card) 71'; Szűcs (yellow card) 84' | Report | Lonwijk (yellow card) 80' | Stadium: Home Park; Attendance: 15,949 (790 away); Referee: Elliot Bell |
Note: Fixture was initially scheduled for a 15:00 kick-off, but was moved for live Sky Sports broadcast.

| 27 January 2026 29 | Plymouth Argyle | 1–1 | Mansfield Town | Plymouth |
| 19:45 GMT | Edwards (yellow card) 16'; Pepple 20'; Sorinola (yellow card) 59' | Report | Sweeney 41'; Oshilaja (yellow card) 86'; Blake-Tracy (yellow card) 90+1' | Stadium: Home Park; Attendance: 14,131 (527 away); Referee: Will Finnie |

| 31 January 2026 30 | Stockport County | 2–1 | Plymouth Argyle | Edgeley |
| 15:00 GMT | Wootton 69', 85' | Report | Watts (yellow card) 20', (goal) 42'; Sorinola (yellow card) 45'; Edwards (yellow card) 49'; Sarpong-Wiredu (yellow card) 74' | Stadium: Edgeley Park; Attendance: 10,117 (1,160 away); Referee: Sam Allison |

| 7 February 2026 31 | Plymouth Argyle | 1–4 | Lincoln City | Plymouth |
| 15:00 GMT | Harding (yellow card) 8'; Pepple 11'; Oseni (yellow card) 58' | Report | Varfolomeyev (yellow card) 14'; Draper 38'; Hackett-Fairchild 53', 65'; Bayliss (yellow card) 79'; Oné (yellow card) 90+6', (goal) 90+7'; House (yellow card) 90+8' | Stadium: Home Park; Attendance: 15,547 (605 away); Referee: Stephen Martin |

| 14 February 2026 32 | Blackpool | 0–4 | Plymouth Argyle | Blackpool |
| 15:00 GMT | Fletcher (yellow card) 11'; Husband (red card) 87' | Report | Dale (yellow card) 21'; Mitchell 30'; Pepple 45+1'; Boateng 45+3'; Watts 60'; Sarpong-Wiredu (yellow card) 67'; Amaechi (yellow card) 87' | Stadium: Bloomfield Road; Attendance: 9,858 (1,400 away); Referee: Paul Howard |

| 17 February 2026 33 | Leyton Orient | 1–3 | Plymouth Argyle | Leyton |
| 19:45 GMT | Archibald (yellow card) 17'; O'Neill 45+3'; Forrester (yellow card) 77'; Koroma (yellow card) 85'; Wellens (yellow card) 90+4' | Report | Dale (yellow card) 20'; Pepple 45+1', (yellow card) 47'; Curtis 52'; Ross 70' | Stadium: Brisbane Road; Attendance: 8,794 (1,250 away); Referee: Alex Chilowicz |

| 21 February 2026 34 | Plymouth Argyle | 5–2 | Cardiff City | Plymouth |
| 12:30 GMT | Tolaj 28', 68' (pen.); Pepple 31', 34'; Watts (yellow card) 37'; Ross (yellow card) 44', (goal) 81'; Boateng (yellow card) 70' | Report | Kellyman (yellow card) 15', (goal) 33', 43'; Osho (yellow card) 45+6'; Ng (yellow card) 67'; Robertson (yellow card) 72' | Stadium: Home Park; Attendance: 16,713 (1,758 away); Referee: Darren Drysdale |
Note: Fixture was initially scheduled for a 15:00 kick-off, but was moved for live Sky Sports broadcast.

| 28 February 2026 35 | Rotherham United | 1–0 | Plymouth Argyle | Rotherham |
| 15:00 GMT | Rafferty 7', (yellow card) 78'; Baptiste (yellow card) 15'; Benson (yellow card) 29'; Martha (yellow card) 32'; Gore (yellow card) 75' | Report | Harding (yellow card) 28'; Pleguezuelo (yellow card) 42'; Sorinola (yellow card) 81'; Edwards (yellow card) 81'; MacKenzie (yellow card) 87' | Stadium: New York Stadium; Attendance: 8,502 (1,139 away); Referee: Zac Kennard-Kettle |

| 7 March 2026 36 | Plymouth Argyle | 2–1 | Doncaster Rovers | Plymouth |
| 15:00 GMT | Edwards (yellow card) 21'; Pepple 45+3', (yellow card) 60'; Curtis (penalty missed) 51'; MacKenzie (yellow card) 58'; Watts (yellow card) 72'; Kane 74'; Ashby-Hammond (yellow card) 90+4' | Report | Lee 22'; Senior (yellow card) 35'; Clifton (yellow card) 42'; Molyneux (yellow card) 73'; Sterry (yellow card) 81' | Stadium: Home Park; Attendance: 16,046 (537 away); Referee: Stephen Parkinson |

| 10 March 2026 26 | Wigan Athletic | 0–3 | Plymouth Argyle | Wigan |
| 19:45 GMT | | Report | Pepple 38', 40'; Curtis (yellow card) 53'; Watts (yellow card) 64', (goal) 71' | Stadium: Brick Community Stadium; Attendance: 8,055 (555 away); Referee: Scott Oldham |
Note: Fixture was initially scheduled for 10 January, but was postponed due to Wigan's participation in the FA Cup third round.

| 14 March 2026 37 | Reading | 2–2 | Plymouth Argyle | Reading |
| 15:00 GMT | Williams 3'; O'Connor 18'; Nyambe (yellow card) 45+1' | Report | Pepple (yellow card) 1'; Mitchell 6', (yellow card) 31'; Curtis (yellow card) 55'; Watts 67' | Stadium: Madejski Stadium; Attendance: 16,277 (2,897 away); Referee: Seb Stockbridge |

| 17 March 2026 38 | Plymouth Argyle | 1–0 | Stevenage | Plymouth |
| 19:45 GMT | Mitchell (yellow card) 40'; Ross 57'; Amaechi (yellow card) 90+3' | Report | Freestone (yellow card) 9' | Stadium: Home Park; Attendance: 13,945 (160 away); Referee: Elliot Bell |

| 21 March 2026 39 | Plymouth Argyle | 3–1 | Huddersfield Town | Plymouth |
| 15:00 GMT | Hazard (yellow card) 18'; Dale (yellow card) 44', (goal) 47'; Pepple 59' (pen.); Oseni 73'; Amaechi (yellow card) 90+3' | Report | Roughan (yellow card) 12'; Mumba (yellow card) 18'; Humphreys 25'; Feeney (yellow card) 82' | Stadium: Home Park; Attendance: 16,266 (563 away); Referee: Ruebyn Ricardo |

| 3 April 2026 41 | Plymouth Argyle | 1–2 | Bolton Wanderers | Plymouth |
| 15:00 BST | Curtis 57' | Report | Sheehan (yellow card) 18'; McAtee (red card) 43'; Rodrigues (yellow card) 45+2'; Kenny 49' (pen.); Boateng (Note: This goal, originally attributed to as own goal and still listed as such by most sources, was later credited to Dalby by the Dubious Goals Committee.) 70' (o.g.) | Stadium: Home Park; Attendance: 16,616 (1,375 away); Referee: Charles Breakspear |

| 6 April 2026 42 | Barnsley | 0–3 | Plymouth Argyle | Barnsley |
| 15:00 BST | Shepherd (yellow card) 78' | Report | Ross (yellow card) 10'; Oseni 16', 79' (pen.); Tolaj 57' | Stadium: Oakwell; Attendance: 10,722 (1,242 away); Referee: Tom Reeves |

| 11 April 2026 43 | Plymouth Argyle | 2–2 | Exeter City | Plymouth |
| 12:30 BST | Edwards (yellow card) 15'; Watts (yellow card) 62'; Tolaj 79'; Boateng 90' | Report | Cole 47'; McDonald (yellow card) 62'; Bycroft (yellow card) 63'; Mendes (yellow card) 66'; Niskanen (yellow card) 74'; Wareham 87' | Stadium: Home Park; Attendance: 17,016 (1,748 away); Referee: Matt Corlett |
Note: Fixture was initially scheduled for a 15:00 kick-off, but was brought forward following advice from local authorities.

| 18 April 2026 44 | AFC Wimbledon | 1–3 | Plymouth Argyle | Wimbledon |
| 15:00 BST | Johnson (yellow card) 24'; Smith 51'; Seddon (yellow card) 75' | Report | Mitchell 6'; Tolaj (yellow card) 24', (goal) 68'; Ross (yellow card) 45+3'; Wiredu (yellow card) 55'; Pepple 76' | Stadium: Plough Lane; Attendance: 8,736 (939 away); Referee: Elliot Swallow |

| 21 April 2026 40 | Bradford City | 1–1 | Plymouth Argyle | Bradford |
| 19:45 BST | Swan 72'; Lapslie (yellow card) 90+4' | Report | Sarpong-Wiredu 8'; Mitchell (yellow card) 25'; Boateng (yellow card) 36'; Dale (yellow card) 55'; Sorinola (yellow card) 74'; Pepple (yellow card) 84' | Stadium: Valley Parade; Attendance: 18,475 (812 away); Referee: Jamie O'Connor |
Note: Fixture was initially scheduled for 28 March, but was rearranged due to international call-ups.

| 25 April 2026 45 | Plymouth Argyle | 2–1 | Port Vale | Plymouth |
| 15:00 BST | Pepple 3', 47'; Hazard (red card) 5'; Dale (yellow card) 64'; Wiredu (yellow card) 82' | Report | Hall 14', (yellow card) 25'; Archer (yellow card) 16' | Stadium: Home Park; Attendance: 16,129 (355 away); Referee: Isaac Searle |

| 2 May 2026 46 | Northampton Town | 2–3 | Plymouth Argyle | Northampton |
| 15:00 BST | List 13', (yellow card) 64'; Jacobs 18'; McCarthy (yellow card) 45+1' (yellow-red card) 62'; Evans (yellow card) 84' | Report | Tolaj 28'; Dale (yellow card) 34'; Boateng 40', (yellow card) 66'; Ross (yellow card) 59'; Wiredu 74'; Curtis (yellow card) 79' | Stadium: Sixfields Stadium; Attendance: 7,131 (1,531 away); Referee: Benjamin Speedie |

=== FA Cup ===
As a League One side, Plymouth entered the FA Cup in the first round, and were drawn away to League One side Wycombe Wanderers.

Win Draw Loss Fixtures

| 1 November 2025 First round | Wycombe Wanderers | 2–0 | Plymouth Argyle | High Wycombe |
| 15:00 GMT | Woodrow 67' (pen.), 79'; Taylor (red card) 87' | Report | Ibrahim (yellow card) 24'; Ross (yellow card) 34'; Sorinola (yellow card) 68' | Stadium: Adams Park; Attendance: 3,571 (915 away); Referee: Scott Oldham |

=== EFL Cup ===
As a League One side, Plymouth entered the EFL Cup in the first round, and were drawn at home to Championship side Queens Park Rangers. In the second round, they were drawn away to Championship club Swansea City.

Win Draw Loss Fixtures

| 12 August 2025 First round | Plymouth Argyle | 3–2 | Queens Park Rangers | Plymouth |
| 19:45 BST | Paterson (penalty missed) 26'; Sarpong-Wiredu 48'; Oseni 54', 78' | Report | Bennie 21'; Sutton (yellow card) 38'; Kolli 45+2' | Stadium: Home Park; Attendance: 10,884 (986 away); Referee: John Busby |

| 26 August 2025 Second round | Swansea City | 1–1 (5–3 p) | Plymouth Argyle | Swansea |
| 19:45 BST | Vipotnik 22'; Fulton (yellow card) 80' | Report | Sarpong-Wiredu 45'; Roberts (yellow card) 76' | Stadium: Swansea.com Stadium; Attendance: 7,279 (450 away); Referee: Elliot Bell |
| | Penalties |
| | Vipotnik (penalty scored); Galbraith (penalty scored); Cullen (penalty scored); Cabango (penalty scored); Widell (penalty scored) | | (penalty scored) Tolaj; (penalty missed) Sorinola; (penalty scored) Watts; (penalty scored) Mumba |

=== EFL Trophy ===
==== Group stage ====
The group stage draw was held on 26 June 2025. Plymouth were drawn into Southern Group B with Bristol Rovers, Cheltenham Town and Tottenham Hotspur U21.

| Pos | Div | Team | Pld | W | PW | PL | L | GF | GA | GD | Pts | Qualification |
|---|---|---|---|---|---|---|---|---|---|---|---|---|
| 1 | L2 | Bristol Rovers | 3 | 2 | 1 | 0 | 0 | 6 | 4 | +2 | 8 | Advance to Round 2 |
| 2 | L1 | Plymouth Argyle | 3 | 2 | 0 | 0 | 1 | 8 | 3 | +5 | 6 | Advance to Round 2 |
| 3 | L2 | Cheltenham Town | 3 | 0 | 1 | 0 | 2 | 2 | 5 | −3 | 2 | |
| 4 | ACA | Tottenham Hotspur U21 | 3 | 0 | 0 | 2 | 1 | 8 | 12 | −4 | 2 | |

Source: EFL

| Round | 1 | 2 | 3 |
|---|---|---|---|
| Ground | H | H | A |
| Result | W | W | L |
| Position | 1 | 1 | 2 |
| Points | 3 | 6 | 6 |

Source: English Football League
A = Away; H = Home; W = Win; D = Draw; L = Loss

Win Draw Loss Fixtures

| 2 September 2025 1 | Plymouth Argyle | 2–0 | Cheltenham Town | Plymouth |
| 19:00 BST | Tolaj 5', 45'; Edwards (yellow card) 49'; Pepple (penalty missed) 81'; Sarpong-Wiredu (yellow card) 84' | Report | Walters (yellow card) 1'; Tustin (yellow card) 68'; Bennett (red card) 79' | Stadium: Home Park; Attendance: 3,726 (64 away); Referee: Ross Martin |

| 23 September 2025 2 | Plymouth Argyle | 6–2 | Tottenham Hotspur U21 | Plymouth |
| 19:00 BST | Ross 5'; Roberts (yellow card) 12'; Finn 20', 53'; Pepple 28'; Oseni 41'; Galloway (yellow card) 51'; Benarous (yellow card) 68'; Campbell 86' | Report | Russell-Denny 57'; Elliott-Parris (yellow card) 84'; Irow 90+2' | Stadium: Home Park; Attendance: 4,834 (163 away); Referee: Jacob Miles |

| 11 November 2025 3 | Bristol Rovers | 1–0 | Plymouth Argyle | Bristol |
| 19:00 GMT | Cavegn (yellow card) 83'; Conteh 90+4' | Report | Szűcs (red card) 2'; Ross (yellow card) 26'; Ashby-Hammond (yellow card) 61'; Mumba (yellow card) 79' | Stadium: Memorial Stadium; Attendance: 2,110 (697 away); Referee: Aaron Farmer |

==== Knockout stage ====
As a runners-up in the group stage, Plymouth entered the round of 32 as an unseeded team, and were drawn away to League One side Leyton Orient. In the round of 16, Plymouth were drawn away to League Two club Bristol Rovers. They were they drawn away to either Luton Town or Swindon Town in the quarter-finals.

Win Draw Loss Fixtures

| 2 December 2025 Round of 32 | Leyton Orient | 0–1 | Plymouth Argyle | Leyton |
| 19:00 GMT | Koroma (yellow card) 39'; Obiero (yellow card) 54' | Report | Tolaj 90+3' | Stadium: Brisbane Road; Attendance: 1,502 (380 away); Referee: Sam Mulhall |

| 13 January 2026 Round of 16 | Bristol Rovers | 3–4 | Plymouth Argyle | Bristol |
| 19:00 GMT | Forde 21'; Cavegn 39'; Thomas 61'; Hutchinson (yellow card) 62'; Balmer (yellow card) 89'; Lockyer (yellow card) 90+6' | Report | Watts 2'; Galloway 46', (yellow card) 90+1'; Tolaj 49'; Boateng (yellow card) 65'; Pepple 90+4' | Stadium: Memorial Stadium; Attendance: 2,548 (945 away); Referee: Alex Chilowicz |

| 24 February 2026 Quarter-finals | Luton Town | 2–1 | Plymouth Argyle | Luton |
| 19:00 GMT | Jones 16'; Clark 89' (pen.) | Report | Edwards (yellow card) 55'; Finn 77'; Ross (yellow card) 88'; Hazard (yellow card) 89' | Stadium: Kenilworth Road; Attendance: 4,203; Referee: Ben Speedie |

== Statistics ==
=== Appearances and goals ===
Players with no appearances are not included on the list, italics indicate a loaned in player

| No. | Pos | Nat | Player | Total | | League One | | FA Cup | | EFL Cup | | EFL Trophy | |
| No. | Pos | Nat | Player | Apps | Goals | Apps | Goals | Apps | Goals | Apps | Goals | Apps | Goals |
|---|---|---|---|---|---|---|---|---|---|---|---|---|---|
| 1 | GK | (Northern Ireland) NIR | Conor Hazard | 32 | 0 | 29+0 | 0 | 1+0 | 0 | 0+0 | 0 | 2+0 | 0 |
| 2 | DF | (Denmark) DEN | Mathias Ross | 46 | 5 | 32+7 | 4 | 1+0 | 0 | 0+0 | 0 | 6+0 | 1 |
| 3 | DF | (Scotland) SCO | Jack MacKenzie | 12 | 0 | 6+5 | 0 | 0+0 | 0 | 0+0 | 0 | 0+1 | 0 |
| 4 | MF | (England) ENG | Brendan Sarpong-Wiredu | 42 | 4 | 20+16 | 2 | 0+0 | 0 | 2+0 | 2 | 4+0 | 0 |
| 5 | DF | (Spain) ESP | Julio Pleguezuelo | 10 | 0 | 6+2 | 0 | 0+0 | 0 | 0+0 | 0 | 1+1 | 0 |
| 7 | FW | (England) ENG | Jamie Paterson | 28 | 0 | 7+15 | 0 | 1+0 | 0 | 1+0 | 0 | 1+3 | 0 |
| 8 | DF | (England) ENG | Joe Edwards | 41 | 0 | 32+3 | 0 | 0+0 | 0 | 1+0 | 0 | 5+0 | 0 |
| 9 | FW | (Switzerland) SUI | Lorent Tolaj | 35 | 21 | 27+2 | 17 | 1+0 | 0 | 0+1 | 0 | 4+0 | 4 |
| 10 | FW | (England) ENG | Xavier Amaechi | 32 | 3 | 7+22 | 3 | 0+0 | 0 | 0+1 | 0 | 2+0 | 0 |
| 14 | MF | (England) ENG | Ayman Benarous | 15 | 0 | 5+7 | 0 | 0+0 | 0 | 1+0 | 0 | 1+1 | 0 |
| 15 | DF | (England) ENG | Alex Mitchell | 47 | 3 | 40+0 | 3 | 1+0 | 0 | 1+0 | 0 | 3+2 | 0 |
| 17 | MF | (Australia) AUS | Caleb Watts | 33 | 7 | 21+8 | 6 | 0+0 | 0 | 0+2 | 0 | 1+1 | 1 |
| 18 | FW | (Nigeria) NGR | Owen Oseni | 33 | 10 | 16+11 | 7 | 0+1 | 0 | 2+0 | 2 | 3+0 | 1 |
| 19 | MF | (England) ENG | Malachi Boateng | 54 | 5 | 46+0 | 5 | 0+1 | 0 | 1+1 | 0 | 4+1 | 0 |
| 20 | MF | (England) ENG | Herbie Kane | 8 | 1 | 6+2 | 1 | 0+0 | 0 | 0+0 | 0 | 0+0 | 0 |
| 21 | GK | (England) ENG | Luca Ashby-Hammond | 24 | 0 | 17+1 | 0 | 0+0 | 0 | 2+0 | 0 | 4+0 | 0 |
| 22 | DF | (Zimbabwe) ZIM | Brendan Galloway | 26 | 2 | 18+6 | 1 | 0+0 | 0 | 0+0 | 0 | 1+1 | 1 |
| 23 | MF | (England) ENG | Bradley Ibrahim | 21 | 3 | 12+3 | 3 | 1+0 | 0 | 2+0 | 0 | 2+1 | 0 |
| 24 | MF | (England) ENG | Caleb Roberts | 14 | 0 | 1+7 | 0 | 1+0 | 0 | 1+0 | 0 | 3+1 | 0 |
| 25 | FW | (Wales) WAL | Freddie Issaka | 3 | 0 | 0+2 | 0 | 0+0 | 0 | 0+1 | 0 | 0+0 | 0 |
| 27 | FW | (England) ENG | Aribim Pepple | 41 | 18 | 23+12 | 16 | 0+0 | 0 | 1+1 | 0 | 2+2 | 2 |
| 28 | FW | (Republic of Ireland) IRL | Ronan Curtis | 23 | 2 | 21+0 | 2 | 0+0 | 0 | 0+0 | 0 | 2+0 | 0 |
| 29 | DF | (England) ENG | Matthew Sorinola | 44 | 1 | 26+10 | 1 | 1+0 | 0 | 1+1 | 0 | 5+0 | 0 |
| 32 | MF | (England) ENG | Joe Ralls | 11 | 1 | 8+2 | 1 | 0+0 | 0 | 0+0 | 0 | 0+1 | 0 |
| 35 | FW | (England) ENG | Owen Dale | 32 | 1 | 22+6 | 1 | 1+0 | 0 | 0+0 | 0 | 2+1 | 0 |
| 38 | FW | (Wales) WAL | Joe Hatch | 6 | 0 | 0+3 | 0 | 0+0 | 0 | 2+0 | 0 | 1+0 | 0 |
| 39 | FW | (England) ENG | Tegan Finn | 19 | 3 | 3+8 | 0 | 0+1 | 0 | 2+0 | 0 | 2+3 | 3 |
| 41 | MF | (England) ENG | Sebastian Campbell | 2 | 1 | 0+1 | 0 | 0+0 | 0 | 0+0 | 0 | 0+1 | 1 |
| 45 | DF | (Jamaica) JAM | Wes Harding | 15 | 0 | 12+2 | 0 | 0+0 | 0 | 0+0 | 0 | 1+0 | 0 |
Player(s) who featured but departed the club permanently during the season:
| 6 | DF | (Hungary) HUN | Kornél Szűcs | 24 | 0 | 11+10 | 0 | 0+0 | 0 | 1+0 | 0 | 1+1 | 0 |
| 11 | MF | (England) ENG | Bali Mumba | 30 | 0 | 22+3 | 0 | 1+0 | 0 | 0+2 | 0 | 2+0 | 0 |
| 20 | MF | (England) ENG | Law McCabe | 13 | 0 | 7+4 | 0 | 0+1 | 0 | 0+0 | 0 | 1+0 | 0 |
| 44 | DF | (Iceland) ISL | Victor Pálsson | 4 | 0 | 3+0 | 0 | 0+0 | 0 | 1+0 | 0 | 0+0 | 0 |

=== Goals ===
| Rank | Pos. | No. | Player | League One | FA Cup | EFL Cup | EFL Trophy | Total |
|---|---|---|---|---|---|---|---|---|
| 1 | FW | 9 | (Switzerland) Lorent Tolaj | 17 | 0 | 0 | 4 | 21 |
| 2 | FW | 27 | (England) Aribim Pepple | 16 | 0 | 0 | 2 | 18 |
| 3 | FW | 18 | (Nigeria) Owen Oseni | 7 | 0 | 2 | 1 | 10 |
| 4 | MF | 17 | (Australia) Caleb Watts | 6 | 0 | 0 | 1 | 7 |
| 5 | DF | 2 | (Denmark) Mathias Ross | 4 | 0 | 0 | 1 | 5 |
| 5 | MF | 19 | (England) Malachi Boateng | 5 | 0 | 0 | 0 | 5 |
| 7 | MF | 4 | (England) Brendan Sarpong-Wiredu | 2 | 0 | 2 | 0 | 4 |
| 8 | FW | 10 | (England) Xavier Amaechi | 3 | 0 | 0 | 0 | 3 |
| 8 | DF | 15 | (England) Alex Mitchell | 3 | 0 | 0 | 0 | 3 |
| 8 | DF | 22 | (Zimbabwe) Brendan Galloway | 2 | 0 | 0 | 1 | 3 |
| 8 | MF | 23 | (England) Bradley Ibrahim | 3 | 0 | 0 | 0 | 3 |
| 8 | FW | 39 | (England) Tegan Finn | 0 | 0 | 0 | 3 | 3 |
| 13 | FW | 28 | (Republic of Ireland) Ronan Curtis | 2 | 0 | 0 | 0 | 2 |
| 14 | MF | 20 | (England) Herbie Kane | 1 | 0 | 0 | 0 | 1 |
| 14 | DF | 29 | (England) Matthew Sorinola | 1 | 0 | 0 | 0 | 1 |
| 14 | MF | 32 | (England) Joe Ralls | 1 | 0 | 0 | 0 | 1 |
| 14 | FW | 35 | (England) Owen Dale | 1 | 0 | 0 | 0 | 1 |
| 14 | MF | 41 | (England) Seb Campbell | 0 | 0 | 0 | 1 | 1 |
| 14 | Own goals | | | 1 | 0 | 0 | 0 | 1 |
| Total | | | | 75 | 0 | 4 | 14 | 93 |

=== Clean sheets ===
| Rank | No. | Player | League One | FA Cup | EFL Cup | EFL Trophy | Total |
|---|---|---|---|---|---|---|---|
| 1 | 1 | (Northern Ireland) Conor Hazard | 10 | 0 | 0 | 0 | 10 |
| 2 | 21 | (England) Luca Ashby-Hammond | 2 | 0 | 0 | 2 | 4 |
| Total | | | 12 | 0 | 0 | 2 | 14 |

=== Disciplinary record ===
| Rank | No. | Pos. | Player | League One | | | FA Cup | | | EFL Cup | | | EFL Trophy | | | Total | | |
| Rank | No. | Pos. | Player | Yellow card | (yellow card) (yellow-red card) | Red card | Yellow card | (yellow card) (yellow-red card) | Red card | Yellow card | (yellow card) (yellow-red card) | Red card | Yellow card | (yellow card) (yellow-red card) | Red card | Yellow card | (yellow card) (yellow-red card) | Red card |
|---|---|---|---|---|---|---|---|---|---|---|---|---|---|---|---|---|---|---|
| 1 | 8 | DF | (England) Joe Edwards | 8 | 0 | 1 | 0 | 0 | 0 | 0 | 0 | 0 | 2 | 0 | 0 | 10 | 0 | 1 |
| 1 | 29 | DF | (England) Matthew Sorinola | 12 | 0 | 0 | 1 | 0 | 0 | 0 | 0 | 0 | 0 | 0 | 0 | 13 | 0 | 0 |
| 3 | 2 | DF | (Denmark) Mathias Ross | 8 | 0 | 0 | 1 | 0 | 0 | 0 | 0 | 0 | 2 | 0 | 0 | 11 | 0 | 0 |
| 4 | 4 | MF | (England) Brendan Sarpong-Wiredu | 6 | 1 | 0 | 0 | 0 | 0 | 0 | 0 | 0 | 1 | 0 | 0 | 7 | 1 | 0 |
| 4 | 19 | MF | (England) Malachi Boateng | 8 | 0 | 0 | 0 | 0 | 0 | 0 | 0 | 0 | 1 | 0 | 0 | 9 | 0 | 0 |
| 4 | 35 | FW | (England) Owen Dale | 9 | 0 | 0 | 0 | 0 | 0 | 0 | 0 | 0 | 0 | 0 | 0 | 9 | 0 | 0 |
| 7 | 9 | FW | (Switzerland) Lorent Tolaj | 5 | 0 | 1 | 0 | 0 | 0 | 0 | 0 | 0 | 0 | 0 | 0 | 5 | 0 | 1 |
| 8 | 11 | MF | (England) Bali Mumba | 6 | 0 | 0 | 0 | 0 | 0 | 0 | 0 | 0 | 1 | 0 | 0 | 7 | 0 | 0 |
| 8 | 15 | DF | (England) Alex Mitchell | 7 | 0 | 0 | 0 | 0 | 0 | 0 | 0 | 0 | 0 | 0 | 0 | 7 | 0 | 0 |
| 8 | 17 | MF | (Australia) Caleb Watts | 7 | 0 | 0 | 0 | 0 | 0 | 0 | 0 | 0 | 0 | 0 | 0 | 7 | 0 | 0 |
| 8 | 23 | MF | (England) Bradley Ibrahim | 6 | 0 | 0 | 1 | 0 | 0 | 0 | 0 | 0 | 0 | 0 | 0 | 7 | 0 | 0 |
| 12 | 6 | DF | (Hungary) Kornél Szűcs | 3 | 0 | 0 | 0 | 0 | 0 | 0 | 0 | 0 | 0 | 0 | 1 | 3 | 0 | 1 |
| 13 | 1 | GK | (Northern Ireland) Conor Hazard | 1 | 0 | 1 | 0 | 0 | 0 | 0 | 0 | 0 | 1 | 0 | 0 | 2 | 0 | 1 |
| 13 | 22 | DF | (Zimbabwe) Brendan Galloway | 3 | 0 | 0 | 0 | 0 | 0 | 0 | 0 | 0 | 2 | 0 | 0 | 5 | 0 | 0 |
| 13 | 32 | MF | (England) Joe Ralls | 2 | 0 | 1 | 0 | 0 | 0 | 0 | 0 | 0 | 0 | 0 | 0 | 2 | 0 | 1 |
| 16 | 18 | FW | (Republic of Ireland) Owen Oseni | 4 | 0 | 0 | 0 | 0 | 0 | 0 | 0 | 0 | 0 | 0 | 0 | 4 | 0 | 0 |
| 16 | 27 | FW | (Canada) Aribim Pepple | 4 | 0 | 0 | 0 | 0 | 0 | 0 | 0 | 0 | 0 | 0 | 0 | 4 | 0 | 0 |
| 16 | 28 | FW | (Republic of Ireland) Ronan Curtis | 4 | 0 | 0 | 0 | 0 | 0 | 0 | 0 | 0 | 0 | 0 | 0 | 4 | 0 | 0 |
| 19 | 5 | DF | (Spain) Julio Pleguezuelo | 3 | 0 | 0 | 0 | 0 | 0 | 0 | 0 | 0 | 0 | 0 | 0 | 3 | 0 | 0 |
| 19 | 10 | FW | (England) Xavier Amaechi | 3 | 0 | 0 | 0 | 0 | 0 | 0 | 0 | 0 | 0 | 0 | 0 | 3 | 0 | 0 |
| 21 | 3 | DF | (Scotland) Jack MacKenzie | 2 | 0 | 0 | 0 | 0 | 0 | 0 | 0 | 0 | 0 | 0 | 0 | 2 | 0 | 0 |
| 21 | 14 | MF | (England) Ayman Benarous | 1 | 0 | 0 | 0 | 0 | 0 | 0 | 0 | 0 | 1 | 0 | 0 | 2 | 0 | 0 |
| 21 | 21 | GK | (England) Luca Ashby-Hammond | 1 | 0 | 0 | 0 | 0 | 0 | 0 | 0 | 0 | 1 | 0 | 0 | 2 | 0 | 0 |
| 21 | 45 | DF | (Jamaica) Wes Harding | 2 | 0 | 0 | 0 | 0 | 0 | 0 | 0 | 0 | 0 | 0 | 0 | 2 | 0 | 0 |
| 25 | 20 | MF | (England) Law McCabe | 1 | 0 | 0 | 0 | 0 | 0 | 0 | 0 | 0 | 0 | 0 | 0 | 1 | 0 | 0 |
| 25 | 39 | FW | (England) Tegan Finn | 1 | 0 | 0 | 0 | 0 | 0 | 0 | 0 | 0 | 0 | 0 | 0 | 1 | 0 | 0 |
| Total | | | | 117 | 1 | 4 | 3 | 0 | 0 | 1 | 0 | 0 | 11 | 0 | 1 | 132 | 1 | 5 |
