= Lorent Tolaj =

Swiss footballer (born 2001)

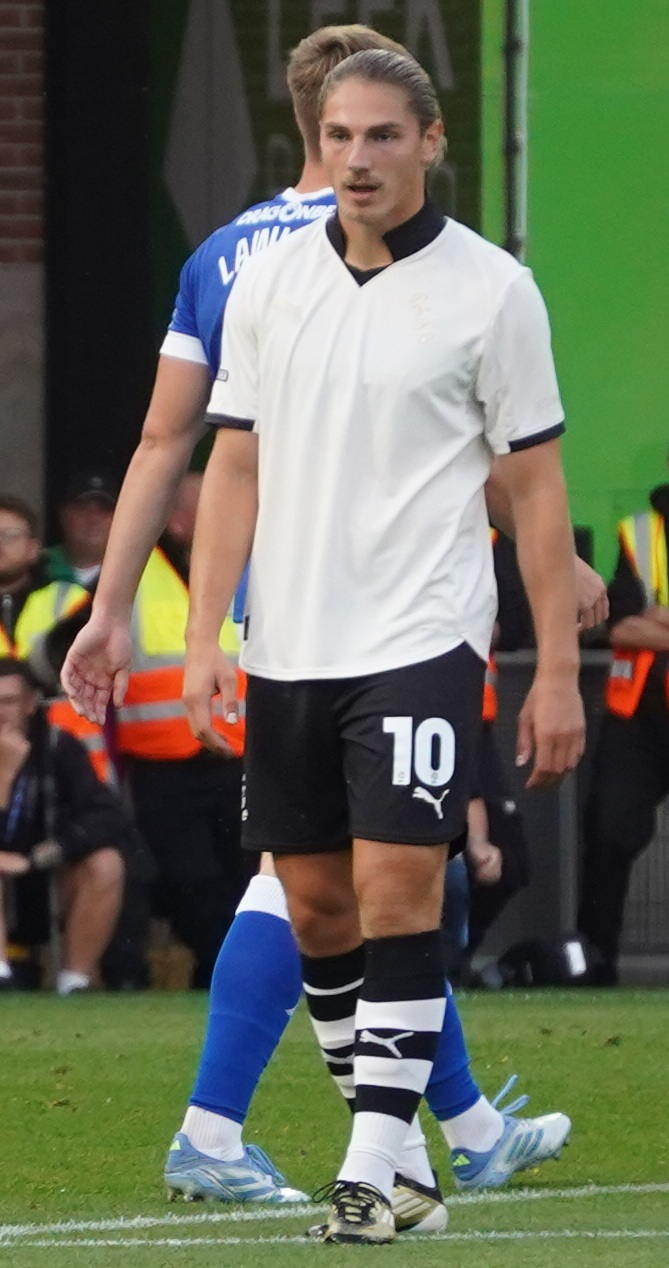
- Tolaj in Port Vale colours (2025)

Personal information
- Full name: Lorent Tolaj
- Date of birth: 23 October 2001 (age 25)
- Place of birth: Aigle, Switzerland
- Height: 1.83 m (6 ft 0 in)
- Position: Forward

Team information
- Current team: Bristol City
- Number: 9

Youth career
- 2016–2018: Sion
- 2018–2022: Brighton & Hove Albion

Senior career*
Years	Team	Apps	(Gls)
2022–2023	Brighton & Hove Albion	0	(0)
2022	→ Cambridge United (loan)	4	(0)
2022–2023	→ Salford City (loan)	11	(0)
2023	→ Dundee (loan)	2	(0)
2023–2024	Aldershot Town	44	(19)
2024–2025	Port Vale	41	(15)
2025–2026	Plymouth Argyle	29	(17)
2026–	Bristol City	8	(2)

International career
2017	Switzerland U17	3	(2)
2018–2019	Switzerland U18	5	(1)
2019–2020	Switzerland U19	4	(9)
- * Club domestic league appearances and goals as of 16 October 2026 (UTC)

Lorent Tolaj (born 23 October 2001) is a Swiss professional footballer who plays as a forward for EFL Championship club Bristol City. He represented Switzerland internationally up to under-19 level. He scored eight goals in one match to set the record for the most goals scored in an under-19 Euro qualifier.

Tolaj joined Brighton & Hove Albion from Sion in 2018. He won the Sussex Senior Challenge Cup with the under-23 team, though he never played a first-team game for the club at senior level. He instead spent time on loan at Cambridge United, Salford City and Dundee. He joined Aldershot Town in July 2023 and scored 25 goals in the 2023–24 season, also winning the National League Player of the Month award for January 2024.

He was sold to Port Vale in June 2024 and was their top scorer as the club was promoted out of League Two at the end of the 2024–25 season. He was sold to Plymouth Argyle in August 2025. He scored 21 goals in 35 appearances for Plymouth and was sold to Bristol City in July 2026.

== Club career ==
=== Brighton & Hove Albion ===
Born in Aigle, Tolaj joined Brighton & Hove Albion's academy in June 2018 after playing youth football for Swiss side Sion. On 3 December 2019, he played for the under-23 side against Newport County in the second round of the EFL Trophy, when his missed penalty lost the shoot-out following a 0–0 draw after 90 minutes. Coach Simon Rusk said it was a result despite Tolaj also missing "a golden late chance" before the final whistle. He missed nine months of the 2020–21 season with knee and hamstring injuries.

On 31 January 2022, he joined Brighton teammate Jensen Weir at EFL League One club Cambridge United on loan until the end of the 2021–22 season after having scored eight goals and three assists for the Brighton under-23 side in the first half of the campaign. A day later, he made his debut for the U's as a substitute in a 2–0 away defeat at Bolton Wanderers.

On 18 April, it was confirmed that Tolaj had left the Abbey Stadium and returned to his parent club after only making five substitute appearances in all competitions for Cambridge. Cambridge manager Mark Bonner said that Joe Ironside had returned from injury quicker than expected and that he wanted to prioritise playing time for his club's own players. Tolaj scored two goals for the Seagulls' under-23 side in their 4–2 win over Worthing in the 2022 Sussex Senior Challenge Cup final. Following the game, coach Andrew Crofts said that "he probably felt a little bit hard done by [at Cambridge] but Lorent has got an exciting future".

On 23 August 2022, Tolaj signed for League Two side Salford City on loan for the 2022–23 season. He scored his first goal in the English Football League (EFL) on 22 November, in a 1–0 EFL Trophy victory over Bradford City at Moor Lane, winning praise from manager Neil Wood for his shooting. This was his only goal in 17 appearances for the Ammies.

On 31 January 2023, Tolaj left Salford and joined Scottish Championship club Dundee on loan until the end of the season. He made his debut for the Dark Blues as a substitute in a league game away to Hamilton Academical. He made a further two substitute appearances for manager Gary Bowyer. In April, Tolaj returned to Brighton after suffering an injury to his achilles tendon, and would only briefly return to Dens Park before the issue flared up again. On 16 June 2023, Tolaj was released from his contract with Brighton without making a first-team appearance at Falmer Stadium.

=== Aldershot Town ===
On 7 July 2023, Tolaj joined National League side Aldershot Town on a one-year deal. Manager Tommy Widdrington recalled how head of recruitment Jamie Hedges had to persuade him to play non-League football in England to win a move back into the EFL rather than return to Switzerland and earn more money in the Swiss Challenge League. Tolaj was sent off in a pre-season game at Farnborough. He scored a brace in his debut for the Shots, in a 5–2 league win over Oxford City.

On 28 August, Tolaj would play part of a league game away to Eastleigh as a goalkeeper after Shots goalie Jordi van Stappershoef was sent off. On 14 October, he scored a hat-trick in a 4–1 win over Lewes in an FA Cup qualification round match at the Recreation Ground to earn himself a place on the FA Cup Team of the Week. On 4 November, he scored a brace against League Two side Swindon Town in a 7–4 victory in the FA Cup proper.

In February 2024, the club announced they had triggered an option in Tolaj's contract to see him remain there until June 2025. This came after an impressive run of form during January, scoring four goals and assisting another, which won him the National League Player of the Month award. On 12 March, he scored a brace in a 4–1 win over Ebbsfleet United to win a place on the National League Team of Midweek. Aldershot missed out on the play-offs at the end of the 2023–24 season after finishing in eighth place, two points behind Gateshead. The Aldershot Town Supporters Club named him their Player of the Season, while the players voted him as Players’ Player of the Season.

=== Port Vale ===
On 28 June 2024, Tolaj joined League Two club Port Vale for an undisclosed fee, signing a three-year contract. On 7 September, he scored a goal and provided two assists in a 4–1 win at Newport County and was subsequently named in the EFL League Two Team of the Week and the overall League Two Player of the Week. He was dropped from the starting eleven but impressed when he was started alongside Jayden Stockley in his preferred centre forward role in January 2025. He put in two consecutive player of the match appearances at the start of February, scoring a brace in a 3–3 draw at Swindon Town to also be named as the League Two Player of the Week.

On 5 April, he scored two goals and secured an assist in a 3–2 win at Walsall to claim the EFL Player of the Week award. He followed this up with another brace in a 5–0 win over Bromley that secured him a place on the EFL Team of the Week and a rating of third best performer in that weekend's League Two action. He was given the Community Champion and Top Goalscorer awards at the club's end of season award ceremomy. He also provided the most assists in the team, with eight in total. Readers of the Valiant substack voted him as their Player of the Month for April. He was also named as League Two Player of the Month for April, with pundit Don Goodman crediting Tolaj for helping the team to secure an automatic promotion place.

=== Plymouth Argyle ===
On 22 August 2025, Tolaj was signed by League One rivals Plymouth Argyle on a four-year deal after they activated a "substantial release clause" in his Vale contract. This fee was reported to be £1.2 million. Argyle head coach Tom Cleverley said that he had brought "the right number nine in the building" following his "monumental rise up the footballing pyramid". After scoring his first two goals for Argyle in an EFL Trophy victory over Cheltenham Town on 9 September, Tolaj scored his first league goal four days later in a 4–2 victory over Stockport County at Home Park. He scored a brace in a 4–0 victory away Burton Albion on 27 September to earn himself a place on the EFL League One Team of the Week. He scored five goals in five games to pick up the club's Player of the Month award for September.

He was sent off for an off-the-ball incident in a 3–0 loss to Northampton Town on 29 November. He scored a hat-trick in his next league game, a 5–1 win at Doncaster Rovers, after which he targeted 30 goals at the end of the season as his strike partnership with Owen Oseni looked impressive. His form reportedly attracted the interest of Scottish champions Celtic. On 21 February, he scored a brace in a 5–2 home win over Cardiff City, whilst providing strike partner Aribim Pepple with two assists for a brace of his own.

On 18 April, a well-timed and improvised strike at AFC Wimbledon earned him a League One Goal of the Month nomination. He scored 21 goals in 35 games for Plymouth in the 2025–26 season, and was named on the League One Team of the Season with the most shots per game and second-highest goals plus assists tally in the division. Cleverley said any interested club would "have to pay a lot of money" to sign him.

=== Bristol City ===
On 20 July 2026, Tolaj joined Championship club Bristol City on a four-year contract for an undisclosed transfer fee.

== International career ==
Born in Switzerland, Tolaj is of Kosovar descent and is a Muslim who fasts during Ramadan. He has represented Switzerland internationally at under-17, under-18 and under-19 levels.

On 19 November 2019, Tolaj scored eight goals in Switzerland U19's 16–1 win over Gibraltar U19, setting the record for the most goals scored in an under-19 Euro qualifier.

== Style of play ==
Tolaj is a forward who can hold the ball up and also has good movement around the penalty area. He has a powerful left-footed shot. He described himself as "a number nine striker", adding "I'm a powerful striker, quick and I'm confident in front of goal".

== Career statistics ==
As of match played 29 August 2026

Appearances and goals by club, season and competition
Club	Season	League			FA Cup		League Cup		Other		Total	
Club	Season	Division	Apps	Goals	Apps	Goals	Apps	Goals	Apps	Goals	Apps	Goals
Brighton & Hove Albion U21	2019–20	—			—		—		1 (Note: Appearance(s) in EFL Trophy)	0	1	0
Brighton & Hove Albion U21	2021–22	—			—		—		3	2	3	2
Brighton & Hove Albion U21	Total		0	0	0	0	0	0	4	2	4	2
Brighton & Hove Albion	2021–22	Premier League	0	0	0	0	0	0	—		0	0
Cambridge United (loan)	2021–22	League One	4	0	1	0	0	0	—		5	0
Salford City (loan)	2022–23	League Two	11	0	0	0	—		6	1	17	1
Dundee (loan)	2022–23	Scottish Championship	2	0	—		—		1 (Note: Appearances in Scottish Challenge Cup)	0	3	0
Aldershot Town	2023–24	National League	44	19	5	5	—		2 (Note: Appearances in FA Trophy)	1	51	25
Port Vale	2024–25	League Two	37	14	0	0	1	0	4	1	42	15
Port Vale	2025–26	League One	4	1	0	0	0	0	0	0	4	1
Port Vale	Total		41	15	0	0	1	0	4	1	46	16
Plymouth Argyle	2025–26	League One	29	17	1	0	1	0	4	4	35	21
Bristol City	2026–27	Championship	3	1	0	0	1	0	—		4	1
Career total			134	52	7	5	3	0	21	9	165	66

== Honours ==
Brighton & Hove Albion U23

- Sussex Senior Challenge Cup: 2022

Port Vale

- EFL League Two second-place promotion: 2024–25

Individual

- National League Player of the Month: January 2024
- EFL League Two Player of the Month: April 2025
- Aldershot Town Players’ Player of the Season: 2023–24
