= Alex Mitchell (English footballer) =

English footballer (born 2001)

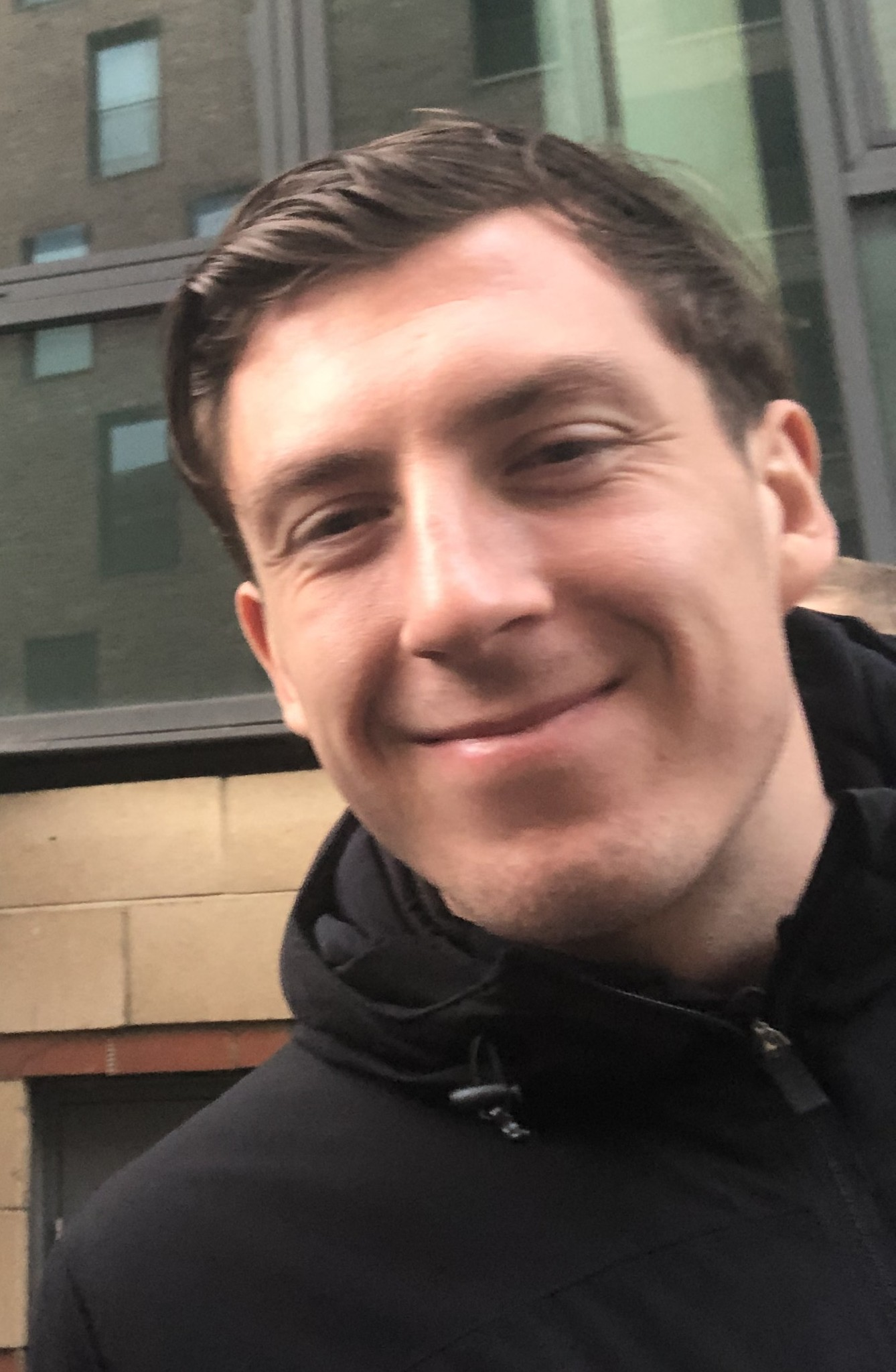
- Mitchell in 2025

Personal information
- Full name: Alexander Paul Mitchell
- Date of birth: 7 October 2001 (age 25)
- Height: 6 ft 3 in (1.91 m)
- Position: Centre-back

Team information
- Current team: Plymouth Argyle
- Number: 15

Youth career
- New Windsor Kestrels
- 2018–2020: Millwall

Senior career*
Years	Team	Apps	(Gls)
2020–2024	Millwall	0	(0)
2021	→ Bromley (loan)	9	(0)
2021–2022	→ Leyton Orient (loan)	26	(0)
2022–2023	→ St Johnstone (loan)	29	(1)
2023–2024	→ Lincoln City (loan)	36	(1)
2024–2026	Charlton Athletic	31	(2)
2025–2026	→ Plymouth Argyle (loan)	40	(3)
2026–	Plymouth Argyle	14	(0)
- * Club domestic league appearances and goals as of 15:32, 8 November 2026 (UTC)

Alexander Paul Mitchell (born 7 October 2001) is an English professional footballer who plays as a centre-back for EFL League One club Plymouth Argyle.

== Career ==
Mitchell began playing for New Windsor Kestrels at the age of seven. He was also a rower at his school, The Windsor Boys' School.

After trials with Brentford, Reading, Wycombe, and Aldershot, Mitchell signed for Millwall in 2018, the same year he was voted the club's Academy Schoolboy of the Year, spending time on loan at non-league Bromley, before signing a new long-term contract with Millwall in August 2021. Later that month he moved on loan to Leyton Orient.

In July 2022, he moved on loan to Scottish club St Johnstone. He was named as Young Player of the Year in May 2023.

On 17 August 2023, he joined Lincoln City on a season-long loan. He made his debut coming off the bench in a 3–0 win against Blackpool on 26 August 2023. Mitchell scored his first Lincoln goal on 21 October against Fleetwood Town. Mitchell was named as the club's Player of the Month for October 2023.

On 24 June 2024, Mitchell joined League One side Charlton Athletic on a three-year contract, for an undisclosed fee.

On 18 August 2025, Mitchell joined Plymouth Argyle on a season-long loan. In December 2025 he was awarded the club's Player of the Month, winning the award again in March 2026. At the end of season awards, he was voted Player of the Season for the 2025–26 season.

On 23 July 2026, Mitchell re-joined Plymouth Argyle on a permanent basis, signing a three-year deal.

== Career statistics ==
As of match played 7 November 2026

Appearances and goals by club, season and competition
Club	Season	League			National cup (Note: Includes FA Cup, Scottish Cup)		League cup (Note: Includes EFL Cup, Scottish League Cup)		Other		Total	
Club	Season	Division	Apps	Goals	Apps	Goals	Apps	Goals	Apps	Goals	Apps	Goals
Millwall	2020–21	Championship	0	0	0	0	0	0	—		0	0
Millwall	2021–22	Championship	0	0	0	0	1	0	—		1	0
Millwall	2022–23	Championship	0	0	0	0	0	0	—		0	0
Millwall	2023–24	Championship	0	0	0	0	0	0	—		0	0
Millwall	Total		0	0	0	0	1	0	0	0	1	0
Bromley (loan)	2020–21	National League	9	0	0	0	0	0	1 (Note: Appearance in the Play-Offs)	0	10	0
Leyton Orient (loan)	2021–22	League Two	26	0	1	0	0	0	3 (Note: Appearance(s) in the EFL Trophy.)	0	30	0
St Johnstone (loan)	2022–23	Scottish Premiership	29	1	0	0	0	0	—		29	1
Lincoln City (loan)	2023–24	League One	36	1	0	0	2	0	3	0	41	1
Charlton Athletic	2024–25	League One	31	2	3	0	0	0	0	0	34	2
Charlton Athletic	2025–26	Championship	0	0	0	0	1	0	—		1	0
Charlton Athletic	Total		31	2	3	0	1	0	0	0	35	2
Plymouth Argyle (loan)	2025–26	League One	40	3	1	0	1	0	5	0	47	3
Plymouth Argyle	2026–27	League One	14	0	1	0	1	0	0	0	16	0
Career total			185	7	6	0	6	0	12	0	209	7

== Honours ==
Charlton Athletic

- EFL League One play-offs: 2025

Individual

- Plymouth Argyle Player of the Year: 2025–26
