= Matthew Sorinola =

English footballer (born 2001)

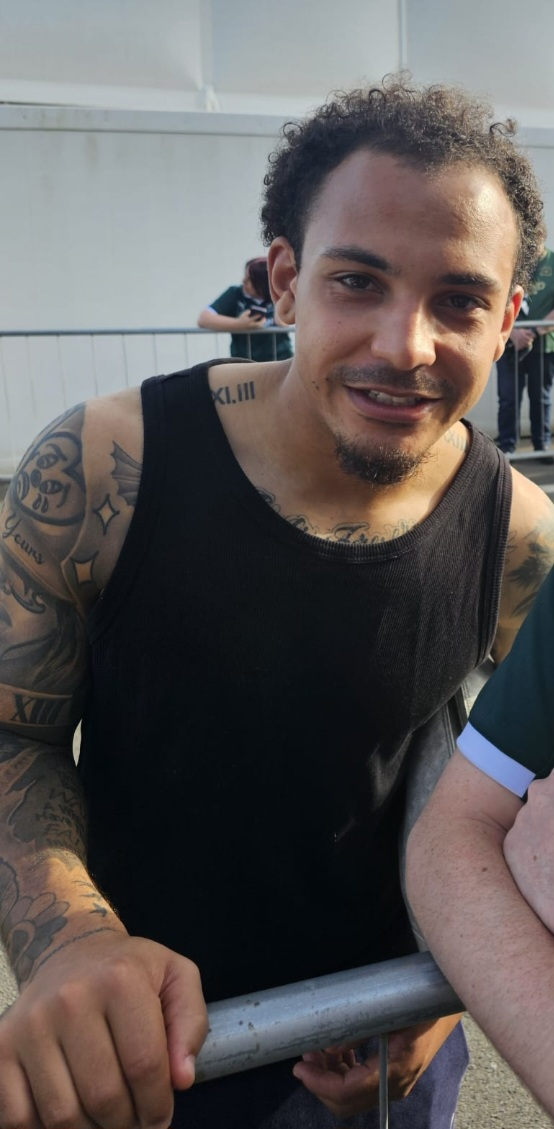
- Sorinola with Plymouth Argyle in 2026

Personal information
- Full name: Matthew Alexander Sorinola
- Date of birth: 19 February 2001 (age 25)
- Place of birth: Lambeth, England
- Height: 5 ft 8 in (1.73 m)
- Position: Wing-back

Team information
- Current team: Plymouth Argyle
- Number: 29

Youth career
- 2009–2016: Fulham
- 2017–2019: Milton Keynes Dons

Senior career*
Years	Team	Apps	(Gls)
2019–2021	Milton Keynes Dons	34	(1)
2020	→ Beaconsfield Town (loan)	2	(0)
2021–2023	Union SG	14	(1)
2022–2023	→ Swansea City (loan)	29	(2)
2024–	Plymouth Argyle	84	(2)
- * Club domestic league appearances and goals as of 24 October 2026 (UTC)

Matthew Alexander Sorinola (born 19 February 2001) is an English professional footballer who plays as a wing back for EFL League One club Plymouth Argyle.

== Early life ==
Sorinola was born in Lambeth. He is of Nigerian descent.

== Club career ==
=== Milton Keynes Dons ===
In 2017, Sorinola joined Milton Keynes Dons academy having previously played for Fulham's academy sides. He signed a professional deal with the club in June 2019. During the 2019–20 EFL Trophy, Sorinola made three first team appearances, against Fulham U21, Wycombe Wanderers and Newport County. He signed a new contract with MK Dons in December 2019, before joining Beaconsfield Town on loan in February 2020.

Sorinola scored his first professional goal for the club on 8 September 2020, in a 3–1 EFL Trophy win over Northampton Town. On 30 January 2021 he scored his first league goal in a 2–0 away win over AFC Wimbledon.

=== Union SG ===
On 14 May 2021, Sorinola joined newly-promoted Belgian First Division A side Union SG on a three-year deal after rejecting a new deal with MK Dons. He scored his first goal for the club on 18 September 2021 in a 2–1 home win over Zulte Waregem.

On 24 June 2022, he joined EFL Championship club Swansea City on a season-long loan, reuniting with former coach Russell Martin.

On 28 December 2023, Sorinola was released by mutual consent.

=== Plymouth Argyle ===
On 17 January 2024, Sorinola returned to England, joining Championship club Plymouth Argyle.

On Saturday 10 October 2026, Sorinola made his 100th first team appearance for Plymouth Argyle in the 2-1 League One win over AFC Wimbledon.

== Career statistics ==
As of 24 October 2026

Appearances and goals by club, season and competition
Club	Season	League			FA Cup		League Cup		Other		Total	
Club	Season	Division	Apps	Goals	Apps	Goals	Apps	Goals	Apps	Goals	Apps	Goals
Milton Keynes Dons	2019–20	League One	0	0	0	0	0	0	3	0	3	0
Milton Keynes Dons	2020–21	League One	34	1	2	0	1	0	6	2	43	3
Milton Keynes Dons	Total		34	1	2	0	1	0	9	2	46	3
Beaconsfield Town (loan)	2019–20	Southern Premier South	2	0	—		—		—		2	0
Union SG	2021–22	Belgian First Division A	14	1	—		—		—		14	1
Swansea City (loan)	2022–23	Championship	23	2	1	0	1	0	—		25	2
Plymouth Argyle	2023–24	Championship	12	1	2	0	0	0	—		14	1
Plymouth Argyle	2024–25	Championship	25	0	3	0	2	0	—		30	0
Plymouth Argyle	2025–26	League One	36	1	1	0	2	0	5 (Note: Appearances in EFL Trophy)	0	43	1
Plymouth Argyle	2026–27	League One	11	0	0	0	2	0	2	0	15	0
Plymouth Argyle	Total		84	2	6	0	6	0	7	0	103	2
Career total			157	6	9	0	8	0	15	2	190	8
