= Ayman Benarous =

English footballer (born 2003)

Personal information
- Full name: Ayman Omar Benarous
- Date of birth: 27 July 2003 (age 23)
- Place of birth: Bristol, England
- Height: 1.81 m (5 ft 11 in)
- Position: Left midfielder

Youth career
- 2009–2025: Bristol City

Senior career*
Years	Team	Apps	(Gls)
2021–2025	Bristol City	11	(0)
2025–2026	Plymouth Argyle	12	(0)
2026-	Crawley Town	0	(0)

International career^{‡}
2020	England U17	2	(0)
- * Club domestic league appearances and goals as of 15 February 2026 (UTC) ‡ National team caps and goals as of 21:28, 30 October 2021 (UTC)

Ayman Omar Benarous (born 27 July 2003) is an English professional footballer who played as a left midfielder for EFL League One club Plymouth Argyle.

== Club career ==
=== Bristol City ===
A youth product of Bristol City since the age of 6, Benarous signed his first professional contract with the club on 8 February 2021. He made his professional debut in a 2–1 win in the EFL Championship against Barnsley on the 30th October 2021, coming on for Tyreeq Bakinson in the 67th minute after scoring a hat trick in a U23s game against Watford a few weeks earlier. This was Bristol City's first home win in 9 months. He made his full debut in a 1–1 draw at home to Blackburn. He played his first FA cup game in a 1-0 Extra Time loss to Fulham, leaving the field after 77 minutes to be replaced by Kasey Palmer. On February 1, 2022, after a run of successful games in the team, Benerous signed a new 3-year contract with Bristol City, keeping him at the club until 2025.

Benarous was released from Bristol City on 1 July 2025.

=== Plymouth Argyle ===
On 8 July 2025, Benarous joined League One club Plymouth Argyle on a one-year deal. On 7 May 2026 the club announced the player would be released when his contract expired in the summer.

=== Crawley Town ===
On 10 November 2026, Benarous joined League Two club Crawley Town on a short term deal until early January 2027.

== International career ==
Benarous was born in England to an Algerian father, who owned the popular takeaway Quigleys in central Bristol and an English mother. He is a youth international for England, having represented the England U17s.

== Career statistics ==
As of match played 20 December 2025

Appearances and goals by club, season and competition
Club	Season	League			FA Cup		EFL Cup		Other		Total	
Club	Season	Division	Apps	Goals	Apps	Goals	Apps	Goals	Apps	Goals	Apps	Goals
Bristol City	2021–22	Championship	11	0	1	0	0	0	—		12	0
Bristol City	2022–23	Championship	0	0	0	0	0	0	—		0	0
Bristol City	2023–24	Championship	0	0	0	0	0	0	—		0	0
Bristol City	2024–25	Championship	0	0	0	0	0	0	—		0	0
Bristol City	Total		11	0	1	0	0	0	—		12	0
Plymouth Argyle	2025–26	League One	10	0	0	0	1	0	2 (Note: Appearances in EFL Trophy)	0	13	0
Career total			21	0	1	0	1	0	2	0	25	0

== Honours ==
=== Individual ===
- Bristol-born Player of the Year : 2021- 2022
