= Tegan Finn =

English professional footballer

Personal information
- Full name: Tegan-Lee Finn
- Date of birth: 17 March 2008 (age 18)
- Place of birth: Plymouth, England
- Height: 1.80 m (5 ft 11 in)
- Position: Forward

Team information
- Current team: Plymouth Argyle
- Number: 26

Youth career
- –2024: Plymouth Argyle

Senior career*
Years	Team	Apps	(Gls)
2024–	Plymouth Argyle	16	(0)
2026	→ Torquay United (loan)	3	(1)
- * Club domestic league appearances and goals as of 28 February 2026 (UTC)

Tegan-Lee Finn (born 17 March 2008) is an English professional footballer who plays as a forward for EFL League One club Plymouth Argyle.

== Early life ==
Finn was born in England and attended Ivybridge Community College. He joined the Plymouth Argyle Academy at the under-9 level after progressing through the club's pre-Academy and Plymouth Centre of Excellence programs.

== Club career ==
Finn signed his first professional contract with Plymouth Argyle on 25 August 2025. He made his debut for the first team during the 2024–25 season in the EFL Championship on 2 November 2024 against Leeds United coming on as a substitute in the 69th minute of the match.

== Career statistics ==
As of match played 6 October 2026

Appearances and goals by club, season and competition
Club	Season	League			FA Cup		EFL Cup		Other		Total	
Club	Season	Division	Apps	Goals	Apps	Goals	Apps	Goals	Apps	Goals	Apps	Goals
Plymouth Argyle	2024–25	Championship	4	0	0	0	0	0	—		4	0
Plymouth Argyle	2025–26	League One	12	0	2	0	2	0	4 (Note: Appearances in EFL Trophy)	3	20	3
Plymouth Argyle	2026–27	League One	0	0	0	0	1	0	1	0	2	0
Career total			15	0	2	0	3	0	5	3	26	3
