= Zak Baker =

English footballer (born 2004)

Personal information
- Full name: Zak Andrew Baker
- Date of birth: 19 November 2004 (age 21)
- Place of birth: Aylesbury, England
- Height: 1.88 m (6 ft 2 in)
- Position: Goalkeeper

Team information
- Current team: Torquay United F.C.

Youth career
- 2016-2023: Plymouth Argyle

Senior career*
Years	Team	Apps	(Gls)
2023–2026	Plymouth Argyle	0	(0)
2023–2024	→ Tiverton Town (loan)	29	(0)
2024	→ Plymouth Parkway (loan)	1	(0)
2024	→ Tiverton Town (loan)	7	(0)
2025	→ Tiverton Town (loan)	4	(0)
2025	→ Plymouth Parkway (loan)	1	(0)
2026-	Torquay United F.C.	0	(0)
- * Club domestic league appearances and goals

Zak Andrew Baker (born 19 November 2004) is an English professional footballer who plays as a goalkeeper for National League South club Torquay United F.C.

== Career ==
Baker signed his first professional contract with Plymouth Argyle in 2023 after spending two years as a football scholar in Argyle's Academy having previously coming up through Argyle's youth set up from the age of 12.

He spent his first year as a professional on loan to Tiverton Town F.C. (where he was awarded Young Player of the Season), whilst still training with Argyle on a daily basis. After a successful spell on loan, he was offered another years contract with Argyle.

At the start of the 2024-25 season, he was sent out on loan to Plymouth Parkway before being recalled early due to Mike Cooper's move to Sheffield United acting as a backup to Conor Hazard. Since then, Baker has rejoined Tiverton Town on loan.

After the short spell on loan, Baker returned to Argyle following a knee injury. He subsequently signed a new contract with Argyle, continuing his long spell at the Club.

On 7 May 2026, Plymouth Argyle released him at the end of his contract. Torquay United signed him on 21 May 2026.
