= Bradley Ibrahim =

English football player (born 2004)

- Ibrahim in 2026

Personal information
- Full name: Bradley Ryan Ibrahim
- Date of birth: 21 October 2004 (age 22)
- Place of birth: Macclesfield, England
- Height: 1.86 m (6 ft 1 in)
- Position: Central midfielder

Team information
- Current team: Plymouth Argyle
- Number: 23

Youth career
- –2017: Queens Park Rangers
- 2017–2024: Arsenal

Senior career*
Years	Team	Apps	(Gls)
2022–2024	Arsenal	0	(0)
2024–2025	Hertha BSC II	12	(0)
2024–2025	→ Crawley Town (loan)	33	(2)
2025–	Plymouth Argyle	28	(3)

International career
2022	England U18	2	(0)
- * Club domestic league appearances and goals as of 24 October 2026 (UTC)

Bradley Ryan Ibrahim (born 21 October 2004) is an English professional footballer who plays as a central midfielder for EFL League One club Plymouth Argyle.

== Career ==
Ibrahim was in the academy at Queens Park Rangers before joining Arsenal in 2017. He signed his first professional contract with the club in 2022. He captained the Arsenal U18 side to the FA Youth Cup final in 2022-2023. He joined Hertha Berlin on a permanent deal on 1 February 2024. He joined up with the Hertha U23 side in the German fourth division.

On 31 August 2024, Ibrahim was announced to have joined League One club Crawley Town on a season-long loan deal.

On 4 June 2025, Ibrahim signed for League One club, Plymouth Argyle on a permanent transfer.

== Style of play ==
Ibrahim is considered able to play centrally in either defence or midfield.

== Career statistics ==
As of match played 24 October 2026

Appearances and goals by club, season and competition
Club	Season	League			Cup		League Cup		Europe		Other		Total	
Club	Season	Division	Apps	Goals	Apps	Goals	Apps	Goals	Apps	Goals	Apps	Goals	Apps	Goals
Arsenal U21	2022–23	—			—		—		—		2 (Note: Appearances in EFL Trophy)	0	2	0
Arsenal U21	2023–24	—			—		—		—		3	0	3	0
Arsenal U21	Total		—		—		—		—		5	0	5	0
Arsenal	2022–23	Premier League	0	0	0	0	0	0	0	0	0	0	0	0
Arsenal	2023–24	Premier League	0	0	0	0	0	0	0	0	0	0	0	0
Arsenal	Total		0	0	0	0	0	0	0	0	0	0	0	0
Hertha BSC II	2023–24	Regionalliga Nordost	11	0	—		—		—		—		11	0
Hertha BSC II	2024–25	Regionalliga Nordost	1	0	—		—		—		—		1	0
Hertha BSC II	Total		12	0	—		—		—		—		12	0
Crawley Town (loan)	2024–25	League One	33	2	2	0	0	0	—		2	0	37	2
Plymouth Argyle	2025–26	League One	15	3	1	0	2	0	—		3	0	21	3
Plymouth Argyle	2026–27	League One	13	0	0	0	1	0	—		2	0	16	0
Plymouth Argyle	Total		28	3	1	0	3	0	—		5	0	37	3
Career total			73	6	3	0	3	0	0	0	12	0	91	6
