= Joe Hatch =

Welsh footballer

Personal information
- Full name: Joseph Colin Hatch
- Date of birth: 7 September 2006 (age 20)
- Place of birth: Braunton, England
- Position: Forward

Youth career
- 2011–2019: Braunton Wanderers
- 2019–: Plymouth Argyle

Senior career*
Years	Team	Apps	(Gls)
2024–	Plymouth Argyle	4	(0)
2025	→ Taunton Town (loan)	4	(0)
2026	→ Torquay United (loan)	1	(0)
2026–	→ Plymouth Parkway (loan)	2	(0)

International career
2022	Wales U16	3	(2)
2022–2023	Wales U17	11	(2)
- * Club domestic league appearances and goals as of 18 February 2026 (UTC)

Joseph Colin Hatch (born 7 September 2006) is a Welsh footballer who played as a forward for EFL League One club Plymouth Argyle.

== Career ==
Hatch joined the Plymouth Argyle academy aged thirteen from local club Braunton Wanderers, being offered an early scholarship with the club aged just fifteen. He officially signed a scholarship deal in July 2023.

On 1 October 2024, Hatch made his senior debut as a late substitute in a 1–0 Championship defeat against Burnley. Following his debut, manager Wayne Rooney revealed that Hatch had yet to train with the first-team and had been given his opportunity due to first-team injuries. The following month however, he was ruled out for the remainder of the season after undergoing knee ligament reconstruction surgery.

Following relegation at the end of the 2024–25 season, Hatch signed a first professional contract.

In September 2025, he joined Southern League Premier Division South club Taunton Town on loan until January 2026. In January 2026, he joined National League South club Torquay United on a one-month loan.

== International career ==
In April 2022, Hatch was called up to the Wales U16 squad for the first time.

== Career statistics ==
As of 23 January 2026

Appearances and goals by club, season and competition
Club	Season	League			FA Cup		League Cup		Other		Total	
Club	Season	Division	Apps	Goals	Apps	Goals	Apps	Goals	Apps	Goals	Apps	Goals
Plymouth Argyle	2024–25	Championship	1	0	0	0	0	0	—		1	0
Plymouth Argyle	2025–26	League One	3	0	0	0	2	0	1 (Note: Appearance(s) in EFL Trophy)	0	6	0
Plymouth Argyle	Total		4	0	0	0	2	0	1	0	7	0
Taunton Town (loan)	2025–26	Southern League Premier Division South	4	0	2	0	—		2	0	8	0
Career total			8	0	2	0	2	0	3	0	15	0
