= Mathias Ross =

Danish footballer (born 2001)

Personal information
- Full name: Mathias Ross Jensen
- Date of birth: 15 January 2001 (age 25)
- Place of birth: Aalborg, Denmark
- Height: 1.90 m (6 ft 3 in)
- Position: Centre-back

Team information
- Current team: Plymouth Argyle
- Number: 2

Youth career
- 2011–2013: Aalborg KFUM
- 2013–2018: AaB

Senior career*
Years	Team	Apps	(Gls)
2018–2022	AaB	94	(5)
2022–2025	Galatasaray	0	(0)
2023–2024	→ NEC (loan)	21	(2)
2024–2025	→ Sparta Prague (loan)	11	(0)
2025–	Plymouth Argyle	47	(4)

International career
2017–2018	Denmark U17	11	(0)
2018–2020	Denmark U19	17	(0)
2021	Denmark U20	2	(0)
2021–2022	Denmark U21	3	(0)
- * Club domestic league appearances and goals as of 10 October 2026

Mathias Ross Jensen (born 15 January 2001) is a Danish professional footballer who plays as a centre-back for EFL League One club Plymouth Argyle. He is the older brother of Oliver Ross.

== Club career ==
=== AaB Fodbold ===
Growing up in the Hasseris district of Aalborg, Ross started his football career as a 10-year-old at Aalborg KFUM. At under-13 level he joined the AaB youth academy. In his first year as a U17 player, other centre-backs were preferred ahead of Ross, which meant that he mainly appeared on the reserve team or as a substitute striker in the final minutes. In his second U17 year, however, he became a regular player for the team in the U17 league. AaB U17 finished the 2017–18 season in third place in the league table, and in June 2018 he was named U17 Player of the Year in AaB.

Ross made his professional debut for the AaB first team on 2 September 2018, when he came on as a substitute after 27 minutes for an injured Jakob Blåbjerg in a 2–2 draw against Randers FC. At the time of the substitution, AaB were behind 2–1, and newspaper Tipsbladet described Ross' debut as "excellent". A month later, in October 2018, he was permanently promoted to AaB's first team squad. During the regular season he was used three times, but from the relegation round he established himself as a starter in the first team. AaB eventually qualified for the play-offs to participate in the first qualifying round for the UEFA Europa League, where they were, eliminated in the first round against AGF.

In January 2019, Ross signed a contract extension keeping him in AaB until 2023.

=== Galatasaray ===
On 8 September 2022, Ross signed a four-year contract with Galatasaray. It was announced that a transfer fee of €1,750,000 would be paid to the player's former team, AaB.

Ross became the champion in the Süper Lig in the 2022–23 season with Galatasaray. Defeating Ankaragücü 4–1 away in the match played on 30 May 2023, Galatasaray secured the lead with two weeks before the end and won the 23rd championship in its history.

On 4 July 4 2025, Galatasaray announced that it has parted ways with defender Ross.

==== Loan to NEC Nijmegen ====
On 21 July 2023, Ross was loaned out to the Eredivisie club NEC for one season. Accordingly, NEC Nijmegen would pay a temporary transfer fee of €250,000 to Galatasaray.

==== Loan to Sparta Prague ====
On 16 July 2024, it was confirmed that Ross joined Sparta Prague, which had Ross' former AaB manager, Lars Friis, as manager, on a loan deal for the 2024–25 season, with a purchase option of around €1.2 million.

=== Plymouth Argyle ===
On 21 August 2025, following his release from Turkish team Galatasaray, Ross signed a three-year contract with English League One club Plymouth Argyle F.C.

== International career ==
Ross made his international debut on 7 October 2017 as part of the Denmark under-17 team, when he was part of the starting lineup and played 90 minutes in a 3–4 defeat to Germany in a friendly match. He went from being a peripheral player under the auspices of the Danish Football Association (DBU) to being team captain in the last match during the 2017 UEFA European Under-17 Championship. He made 11 appearances for the national under-17 team.

Ross made his first appearance for the Denmark under-19 team on 7 September 2018, and soon established himself as a starter.

== Career statistics ==
=== Club ===
As of match played 10 October 2026

Appearances and goals by club, season and competition
Club	Season	League			National cup (Note: Includes Danish Cup, Turkish Cup, KNVB Cup, Czech Cup, FA Cup)		League cup (Note: Includes EFL Cup)		Europe		Other		Total	
Club	Season	Division	Apps	Goals	Apps	Goals	Apps	Goals	Apps	Goals	Apps	Goals	Apps	Goals
AaB	2018–19	Danish Superliga	9	0	0	0	—		—		—		9	0
AaB	2019–20	Danish Superliga	23	0	4	1	—		—		—		27	1
AaB	2020–21	Danish Superliga	26	2	1	0	—		—		—		27	2
AaB	2021–22	Danish Superliga	28	2	1	0	—		—		—		29	2
AaB	2022–23	Danish Superliga	8	1	—		—		—		—		8	1
AaB	Total		94	5	6	1	0	0	0	0	0	0	100	6
Galatasaray	2022–23	Süper Lig	0	0	2	1	—		—		—		2	1
Galatasaray	2023–24	Süper Lig	0	0	0	0	—		0	0	—		0	0
Galatasaray	2024–25	Süper Lig	0	0	0	0	—		0	0	—		0	0
Galatasaray	Total		0	0	2	1	0	0	0	0	0	0	2	1
NEC (loan)	2023–24	Eredivisie	21	2	4	0	—		—		—		25	2
Sparta Prague (loan)	2024–25	Czech First League	11	0	2	0	—		3 (Note: Appearances in UEFA Champions League)	1	—		16	1
Plymouth Argyle	2025–26	League One	39	4	1	0	0	0	—		6 (Note: Appearances in EFL Trophy)	1	46	5
Plymouth Argyle	2026–27	League One	8	0	0	0	2	0	—		2	0	12	0
Plymouth Argyle	Total		47	4	1	0	2	0	—		8	1	58	5
Career total			173	11	15	2	2	0	3	1	8	1	201	15

== Honours ==
Galatasaray

- Süper Lig: 2022–23
