= Malachi Boateng =

English footballer (born 2002)

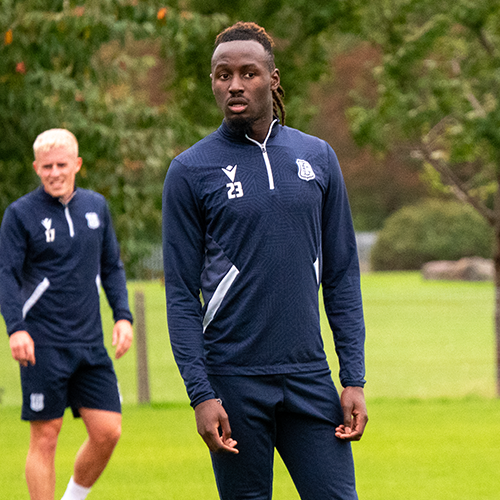
- Boateng training with Dundee in 2023

Personal information
- Full name: Malachi Kofi Owusu Agyeman Boateng
- Date of birth: 5 July 2002 (age 24)
- Place of birth: Kensington and Chelsea, England
- Height: 6 ft 2 in (1.88 m)
- Position: Defensive midfielder

Team information
- Current team: Plymouth Argyle
- Number: 6

Youth career
- 2008–2022: Crystal Palace

Senior career*
| Years | Team | Apps | (Gls) |
| 2022–2024 | Crystal Palace | 0 | (0) |
| 2022–2023 | → Queen's Park (loan) | 34 | (2) |
| 2023–2024 | → Dundee (loan) | 32 | (0) |
| 2024–2025 | Heart of Midlothian | 20 | (0) |
| 2025– | Plymouth Argyle | 55 | (5) |
- * Club domestic league appearances and goals as of 22 August 2026

Malachi Kofi Owusu Agyeman Boateng (born 5 July 2002) is an English footballer who plays for EFL League One side Plymouth Argyle as a defensive midfielder. He came through the youth academy of Crystal Palace, and has previously played for Scottish Club Heart of Midlothian and had loan spells at Queen's Park and Dundee.

== Early life ==
Boateng was born in England and has Ghanaian heritage. He is the younger brother of former Crystal Palace academy footballer Hiram Boateng.

== Career ==
=== Crystal Palace ===
Boateng joined the Crystal Palace youth system at the age of 11, signing his first professional contract with the Eagles in October 2019. He won both the Under-18 and Under-23 player of the season awards during his time in the youth teams, and made three appearances for the Under 21 team in the 2021–22 EFL Trophy. He traveled with the first-team squad on their pre-season tour to Singapore and Australia in advance of the 2022–23 season, making two appearances as substitute.

==== Queen's Park (loan) ====
Boateng joined Scottish Championship side Queen's Park on loan for the 2022–23 season on 12 August 2022. He made his professional debut by starting for Queens Park in a 3–2 victory over Partick Thistle at Ochilview Park a day later. Boateng enjoyed a very strong season with the Spiders, helping the small side come close to winning the league, and would end the season being named to PFA Scotland's Scottish Championship Team of the Year. He was also named as both the committee's and the supporters' Queen's Park Player of the Year at the end of the season.

==== Dundee (loan) ====
On 18 July 2023, Boateng joined Scottish Premiership club Dundee on a season-long loan. He would make his competitive debut later that same day in an away Scottish League Cup group stage win against Bonnyrigg Rose. Boateng had a successful season with Dundee, making 36 total appearances and helping the club finish in the top six of the 2023–24 Scottish Premiership before returning to his parent club.

=== Heart of Midlothian ===
On 3 August 2024, Boateng joined Scottish Premiership club Heart of Midlothian on a three-year deal for an undisclosed fee. He made his debut for Hearts on the same day, coming on as a substitute in the league opener against Rangers.

=== Plymouth Argyle ===
On 3 February 2025, Malachi signed for English club Plymouth Argyle on a three and half-year contract for an undisclosed fee. Boateng made his debut on 9 February, coming on as a substitute in a memorable FA Cup victory over Premier League club Liverpool. On 23 August 2025, Boateng scored his first goal for the Pilgrims, netting the only goal in a league win at home to Blackpool. Boateng went on to start all 46 league games in the 2025/26 season.

== Career statistics ==
As of 22 August 2026

| Club | Season | League | | | National cup (Note: Includes Scottish Cup) | | League cup (Note: Includes Scottish League Cup) | | Other | | Total | |
| Club | Season | Division | Apps | Goals | Apps | Goals | Apps | Goals | Apps | Goals | Apps | Goals |
|---|---|---|---|---|---|---|---|---|---|---|---|---|
| Crystal Palace | 2021–22 | Premier League | 0 | 0 | 0 | 0 | 0 | 0 | 3 (Note: Appearances in EFL Trophy) | 0 | 3 | 0 |
| Crystal Palace | 2022–23 | Premier League | 0 | 0 | 0 | 0 | 0 | 0 | 0 | 0 | 0 | 0 |
| Crystal Palace | 2023–24 | Premier League | 0 | 0 | 0 | 0 | 0 | 0 | 0 | 0 | 0 | 0 |
| Crystal Palace | Total | | 0 | 0 | 0 | 0 | 0 | 0 | 3 | 0 | 3 | 0 |
| Queen's Park (loan) | 2022–23 | Scottish Championship | 34 | 2 | 2 | 0 | 0 | 0 | 5 (Note: Three appearances in Scottish Challenge Cup, and two appearances and one goal in Premiership play-offs) | 1 | 41 | 3 |
| Dundee (loan) | 2023–24 | Scottish Premiership | 32 | 0 | 0 | 0 | 4 | 0 | 0 | 0 | 36 | 0 |
| Heart of Midlothian | 2024–25 | Scottish Premiership | 20 | 0 | 1 | 0 | 1 | 0 | 7 (Note: Two appearances in the UEFA Europa League and five appearances in the UEFA Conference League) | 0 | 29 | 0 |
| Plymouth Argyle | 2024–25 | EFL Championship | 7 | 0 | 2 | 0 | — | | — | | 9 | 0 |
| Plymouth Argyle | 2025–26 | EFL League One | 46 | 5 | 1 | 0 | 2 | 0 | 5 | 0 | 54 | 5 |
| Plymouth Argyle | 2026–27 | EFL League One | 2 | 0 | 0 | 0 | 1 | 0 | 0 | 0 | 3 | 0 |
| Plymouth Argyle | Total | | 55 | 5 | 3 | 0 | 3 | 0 | 5 | 0 | 66 | 5 |
| Career total | | | 141 | 7 | 6 | 0 | 8 | 0 | 20 | 1 | 175 | 8 |
