= Conor Hazard =

Northern Irish footballer (born 1998)

- Hazard with Wycombe Wanderers in 2026

Personal information
- Full name: Conor William Hazard
- Date of birth: 5 March 1998 (age 28)
- Place of birth: Downpatrick, Northern Ireland
- Height: 6 ft 6 in (1.98 m)
- Position: Goalkeeper

Team information
- Current team: Wycombe Wanderers
- Number: 23

Youth career
- –2014: Cliftonville
- 2014–2017: Celtic

Senior career*
Years	Team	Apps	(Gls)
2017–2023	Celtic	5	(0)
2018	→ Falkirk (loan)	11	(0)
2019	→ Partick Thistle (loan)	11	(0)
2019	→ Dundee (loan)	5	(0)
2020	→ Dundee (loan)	6	(0)
2022	→ HJK Helsinki (loan)	24	(0)
2023–2026	Plymouth Argyle	81	(0)
2026–	Wycombe Wanderers	8	(0)

International career^{‡}
2013	Northern Ireland U16	5	(0)
2014	Northern Ireland U17	3	(0)
2015–2016	Northern Ireland U19	3	(0)
2018–2019	Northern Ireland U21	12	(0)
2018–	Northern Ireland	11	(0)
- * Club domestic league appearances and goals as of 12 October 2026 (UTC) ‡ National team caps and goals as of 00:51, 8 June 2024 (UTC)

Conor William Hazard (born 5 March 1998) is a Northern Irish professional footballer who plays as a goalkeeper for EFL League One club Wycombe Wanderers and the Northern Ireland national team.

He previously played for Celtic, where he was part of the team that won the 2020 Scottish Cup final, and spent time out on loan at Falkirk, Partick Thistle, Dundee (on two separate spells) and Finnish side HJK Helsinki, with whom he won the 2022 Veikkausliiga and played in the UEFA Europa League.

== Club career ==
=== Celtic ===
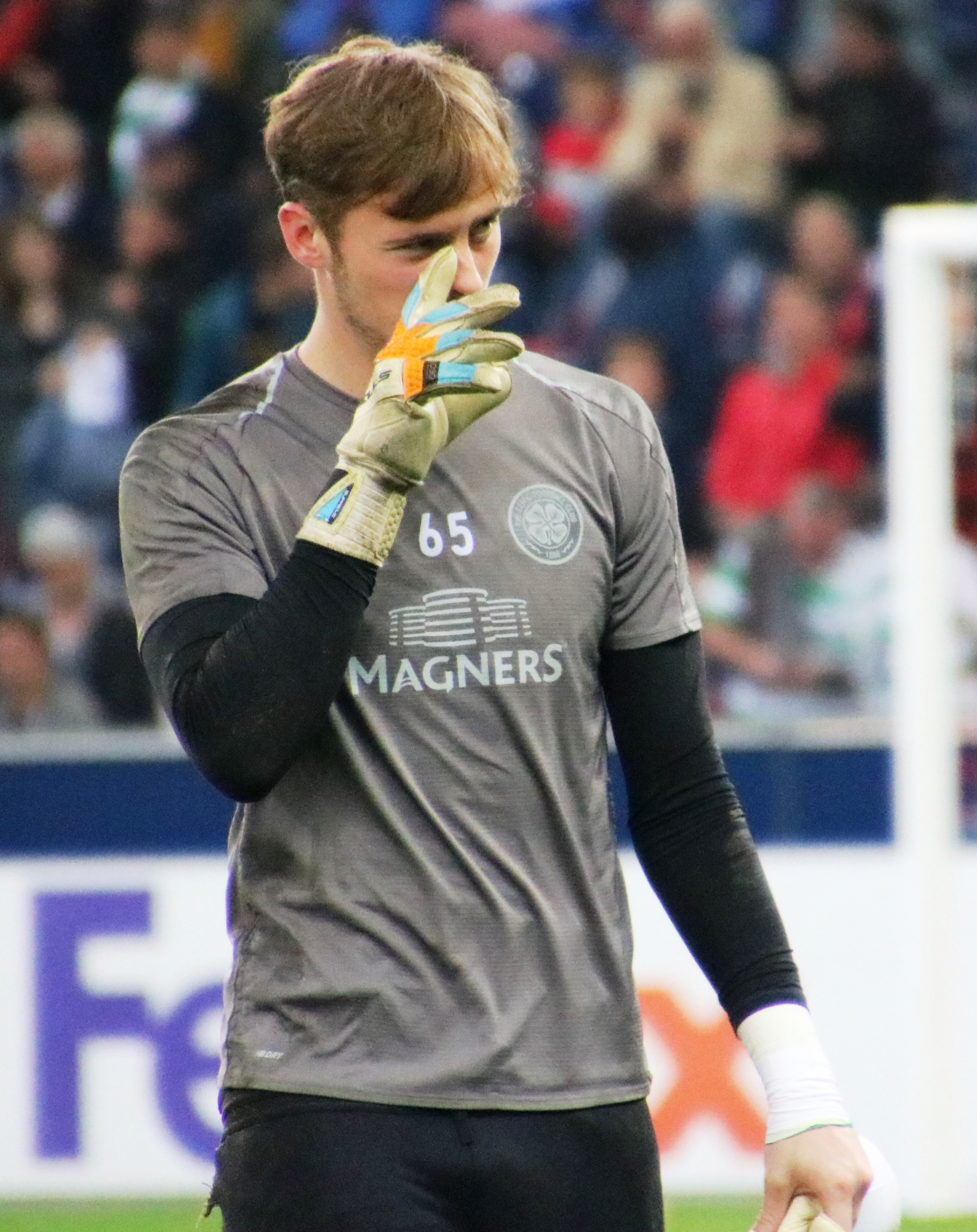
Hazard training for Celtic in 2018

Hazard started his career with Cliftonville before joining Celtic, his boyhood club, in July 2014.

At the beginning of the 2017–18 season, Brendan Rodgers promoted Hazard to the Celtic first-team squad as third choice goalkeeper behind Craig Gordon and Dorus de Vries. On 8 September 2017, Hazard signed a new four-year contract with the then Scottish champions.

==== Loans ====
In January 2018, Hazard moved on loan to Scottish Championship club Falkirk. He made his professional debut in a 3–1 victory over Brechin City on 6 February 2018.

Hazard moved on loan to another Scottish Championship club, Partick Thistle, in January 2019. He helped his side reach the quarter-finals of the Scottish Cup, taking Hearts to a replay where Hazard saved a penalty kick but conceded a late goal, the team ultimately losing 2–1 to exit the tournament.

Hazard joined Dundee on an emergency loan in October 2019, replacing regular starter Jack Hamilton who was out after having his appendix removed. Hazard played five games with Dundee before returning to Celtic in November following Hamilton's return. After impressing Dundee manager James McPake during his short stint with the club, Hazard was brought back to the Dark Blues on loan for the rest of the season in January. Hazard again took the starting spot in February, and only conceded one goal in his next six games, grabbing five consecutive clean sheets in the process. However, both Hazard's and Dundee's great run was cut short due to the COVID-19 pandemic, causing the season to be ended early in April 2020.

==== 2020–21 ====
Hazard made his competitive debut for Celtic on 10 December 2020, in a 3–2 win over Lille in the Europa League. He made a good save near the end of the game from Isaac Lihadji to deny the French side an equaliser. He made his first appearance for Celtic in the Scottish League three days later, keeping a clean sheet in a 2–0 win over Kilmarnock. Hazard started the 2020 Scottish Cup Final against Hearts. The match finished 3–3 after extra time before Celtic won the game in a penalty shootout, during which Hazard saved two penalties from Stephen Kingsley and Craig Wighton. The Northern Irishman subsequently made five appearances in the Scottish Premiership, due to a goalkeeping crisis that involved both the original starter, Vasilis Barkas, and his second-choice, Scott Bain: one of the factors that cost Celtic their tenth consecutive title, as rivals Rangers won the league, instead.

==== 2021–22: HJK loan ====
Ever since the start of the 2021–22 season, with the appointment of Ange Postecoglou as the new Celtic manager, Hazard found himself at the bottom of the pecking order between the sticks of the Hoops (together with Barkas), as Joe Hart became the first-choice goalkeeper immediately after his signing, with Bain being confirmed as the main reserve and Tobi Oluwayemi being promoted to the first team.

After staying in Glasgow for the first part of the season, as he made the match-day squad on a few occasions, on 19 January 2022 Hazard officially joined Finnish side HJK Helsinki on loan for the rest of year. Hazard made his debut for HJK in a Finnish League Cup match against Inter Turku. Hazard had a successful season in goal for HJK both domestically and in Europe. He started in 24 league matches and 13 European matches, as HJK qualified for the 2022–23 UEFA Europa League, ultimately going out in the group stage. The season culminated in winning the Veikkausliiga title. Hazard was named as the Goalkeeper of the Year for the 2022 season. He was also named by the club's supporter group as their player of the season.

=== Plymouth Argyle ===
On 11 July 2023, Hazard signed for newly promoted EFL Championship side Plymouth Argyle for an undisclosed fee. On 5 August 2023, he made his debut in a 3–1 win against Huddersfield Town.

On 9 February 2025, Hazard achieved a career highlight in the FA Cup after keeping a clean sheet in a victory over Premier League side Liverpool, when he made two key saves against Diogo Jota's volley and Darwin Núñez's close-range header in injury time to ensure Plymouth advance into the next stage of the competition.

=== Wycombe Wanderers ===
On 3 June 2026, EFL League One club Wycombe Wanderers announced they had signed Hazard on a free transfer that would see him join the club on 1 July.

== International career ==
Hazard made his debut for the Northern Ireland under-19 team on 26 March 2016 at Sportpark Parkzicht in a 1–0 defeat to the Netherlands. He made his first appearance at full international level for Northern Ireland on 3 June 2018, in a 3–0 defeat against Costa Rica.

== Career statistics ==
=== Club ===
As of match played 5 September 2026

Appearances and goals by club, season and competition
Club	Season	League			National cup (Note: Includes Scottish Cup, Finnish Cup and FA Cup)		League cup (Note: Includes Scottish League Cup, Finnish League Cup and EFL Cup)		Continental		Other		Total	
Club	Season	Division	Apps	Goals	Apps	Goals	Apps	Goals	Apps	Goals	Apps	Goals	Apps	Goals
Celtic	2017–18	Scottish Premiership	0	0	0	0	0	0	0	0	—		0	0
Celtic	2018–19	Scottish Premiership	0	0	0	0	0	0	0	0	—		0	0
Celtic	2019–20	Scottish Premiership	0	0	1	0	0	0	0	0	—		1	0
Celtic	2020–21	Scottish Premiership	5	0	0	0	0	0	1 (Note: Appearance(s) in UEFA Europa League)	0	—		6	0
Celtic	2021–22	Scottish Premiership	0	0	0	0	0	0	0	0	—		0	0
Celtic	2022–23	Scottish Premiership	0	0	0	0	0	0	0	0	—		0	0
Celtic	Total		5	0	1	0	0	0	1	0	—		7	0
Falkirk (loan)	2017–18	Scottish Championship	11	0	1	0	—		—		—		12	0
Partick Thistle (loan)	2018–19	Scottish Championship	11	0	4	0	—		—		—		15	0
Dundee (loan)	2019–20	Scottish Championship	5	0	—		—		—		—		5	0
Dundee (loan)	2019–20	Scottish Championship	6	0	—		—		—		—		6	0
HJK (loan)	2022	Veikkausliiga	24	0	0	0	1	0	14 (Note: Four appearances in UEFA Champions League; Ten appearances in UEFA Europa League)	0	—		39	0
Plymouth Argyle	2023–24	Championship	27	0	3	0	0	0	—		—		30	0
Plymouth Argyle	2024–25	Championship	25	0	3	0	1	0	—		—		29	0
Plymouth Argyle	2025–26	League One	29	0	1	0	0	0	—		2 (Note: Appearance(s) in EFL Trophy)	0	32	0
Plymouth Argyle	Total		81	0	7	0	1	0	—		2	0	91	0
Wycombe Wanderers	2026–27	League One	5	0	0	0	1	0	—		0	0	6	0
Career total			148	0	13	0	3	0	15	0	2	0	181	0

=== International ===
As of match played 31 March 2026

Appearances and goals by national team and year
National team	Year	Apps	Goals
Northern Ireland	2018	1	0
Northern Ireland	2021	2	0
Northern Ireland	2022	1	0
Northern Ireland	2023	3	0
Northern Ireland	2024	1	0
Northern Ireland	2025	2	0
Northern Ireland	2026	1	0
Total		11	0

== Honours ==
Celtic

- Scottish Cup: 2019–20

HJK

- Veikkausliiga: 2022

Individual

- Veikkausliiga Goalkeeper of the Year: 2022
