= Luca Ashby-Hammond =

English footballer (born 2001)

Personal information
- Full name: Luca Ashby-Hammond
- Date of birth: 25 March 2001 (age 25)
- Place of birth: Kingston upon Thames, England
- Height: 1.91 m (6 ft 3 in)
- Position: Goalkeeper

Team information
- Current team: Stockport County
- Number: 26

Youth career
- 2009–2019: Fulham
- 2019: → Liverpool (loan)

Senior career*
| Years | Team | Apps | (Gls) |
| 2021–2025 | Fulham | 0 | (0) |
| 2019–2020 | → Harrow Borough (loan) | 11 | (0) |
| 2022 | → Stockport County (loan) | 0 | (0) |
| 2022–2023 | → Aldershot Town (loan) | 45 | (0) |
| 2023–2024 | → Crawley Town (loan) | 7 | (0) |
| 2024 | → Notts County (loan) | 11 | (0) |
| 2024–2025 | → Gillingham (loan) | 1 | (0) |
| 2025–2026 | Plymouth Argyle | 18 | (0) |
| 2026– | Stockport County | 1 | (0) |

International career
| 2015–2016 | England U15 | 5 | (0) |
| 2016 | England U16 | 4 | (0) |
| 2017–2018 | England U17 | 7 | (0) |
| 2018–2019 | England U18 | 7 | (0) |
| 2019 | England U19 | 5 | (0) |
| 2020 | England U20 | 1 | (0) |
- * Club domestic league appearances and goals as of 11:14, 27 September 2026 (UTC)

Luca Ashby-Hammond (born 25 March 2001) is an English professional footballer who plays as a goalkeeper for EFL League One club Stockport County.

== Club career ==
=== Fulham ===
Born in Kingston upon Thames, Ashby-Hammond began his career with Fulham. After a youth loan at Liverpool in March 2019, he spent time on loan at non-league clubs Harrow Borough, Stockport County and Aldershot Town. He signed on loan for Crawley Town in July 2023.

On 10 January 2024, Ashby-Hammond was recalled from his loan at Crawley Town and joined fellow League Two club Notts County on loan until the end of the season. He signed on loan for Gillingham in August 2024, making four appearances in all competitions before returning to his parent club in January 2025.

Ashby-Hammond departed Fulham upon the expiry of his contract at the end of the 2024–25 season.

=== Plymouth Argyle ===
On 23 July 2025, Ashby-Hammond joined League One club Plymouth Argyle on a one-year contract after a successful trial. He was released by Plymouth at the end of the 2025–26 season.

=== Stockport County ===
On 31 July 2026, Ashby-Hammond re-joined Stockport County, signing a one-year contract.

== International career ==
Ashby-Hammond has represented England at various youth groups up to under-20 level.

== Personal life ==
Ashby-Hammond has a brother, Taye, who is also a goalkeeper. The brothers played against each other in an EFL Trophy match on 12 November 2024, with Luca appearing for Gillingham and Taye for Stevenage in a 1–1 draw.
