= Aribim Pepple =

English footballer (born 2002)

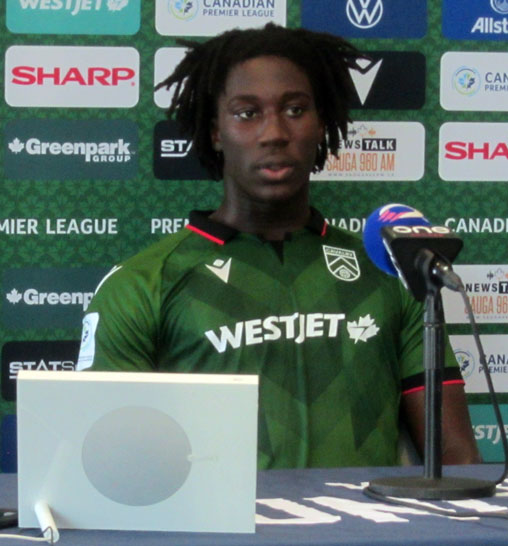
- Pepple in 2022

Personal information
- Full name: Aribusitamunoipirim Emmanuel Pepple
- Date of birth: 25 December 2002 (age 23)
- Place of birth: Kettering, England
- Height: 6 ft 1 in (1.85 m)
- Position: Forward

Team information
- Current team: Plymouth Argyle
- Number: 27

Youth career
- Oadby Owls
- Eastside Memorial FC
- 2018–2019: Calgary Foothills
- 2021: Getafe

Senior career*
Years	Team	Apps	(Gls)
2019	Calgary Foothills	11	(3)
2019–2020	Cavalry FC	13	(0)
2022	Cavalry FC	7	(6)
2022–2025	Luton Town	0	(0)
2022–2023	→ Grimsby Town (loan)	11	(0)
2023–2024	→ Bromley (loan)	6	(0)
2024	→ Inverness Caledonian Thistle (loan)	13	(1)
2024–2025	→ Southend United (loan)	19	(7)
2025	→ Chesterfield (loan)	22	(5)
2025–	Plymouth Argyle	47	(20)
- * Club domestic league appearances and goals as of 24 October 2026

Aribusitamunoipirim Emmanuel Pepple (born 25 December 2002) is an Canadian professional footballer who plays as a forward for EFL League One club Plymouth Argyle.

He has previously played for Calgary Foothills, Cavalry FC and for La Liga side Getafe. He made his EFL debut for Grimsby Town during a loan spell in the 2022–23 season.

== Early and personal life ==
Pepple was born on 25 December 2002 in Kettering, England and is of Nigerian descent. While in England, he played for youth club Oadby Owls at age five. He moved to Canada with his family at the age of five, growing up in Calgary, Alberta. In Canada, he played youth soccer with Eastside Memorial FC, and later joined Calgary Foothills FC.

His father was born in Port Harcourt, Nigeria, while his mother was born in London, England.

== Club career ==
=== Calgary Foothills ===
In October 2018, Pepple participated in the Canadian Premier League open trials in Calgary and was the youngest participant countrywide at 15, but nonetheless made the first cut after day one. In 2019, he joined the Calgary Foothills FC senior side in the Premier Development League, he made eleven league appearances for the Foothills, scoring three goals, and would score another goal in one playoff appearance.

=== Cavalry FC ===
On 9 August 2019, Pepple signed his first professional contract with Canadian Premier League side Cavalry FC until the end of 2020. On 10 August 2019, he made his debut as a substitute in a 0–0 draw against HFX Wanderers. Pepple would be described as "exactly what the Canadian Premier League is built for", and praised by coaching staff shortly after signing with the club for his physical and mental acuity. In November 2019, Cavalry would confirm that Pepple would return for the 2020 season.

In October 2020 Cavalry announced Pepple would join Premier League club Sheffield United on a two-week trial. Shortly after the conclusion of his time at Sheffield, he was invited to another Premier League trial, this time with Leicester City. In March 2021, Pepple would officially announce his departure from Cavalry via his Instagram, indicating that he had joined the youth side of La Liga club Getafe.

=== Getafe ===
In March 2021, Pepple scored on his debut for Getafe's under-19 team.

=== Second spell at Cavalry ===
On 28 April 2022, Pepple returned to Cavalry FC for the 2022 season. In June and July he broke the Canadian Premier League record for longest goalscoring streak, with 6 goals in 5 matches. On 6 July 2022 he was named the CPL's Player of the Month for June after becoming the first-ever player to score in five consecutive league matches. At the time he sat second in the league scoring race with six goals. In July 2022 Cavalry confirmed that they had agreed to a transfer with an undisclosed club, rumoured to be Luton Town, indicating that he would leave the club during the transfer window.

=== Luton Town ===
On 2 August 2022, Pepple signed for EFL Championship club Luton Town for an undisclosed fee, returning to his country of birth.

==== Loan to Grimsby Town ====
Six days after joining Luton, he was loaned out to Grimsby Town for the 2022–23 season. The next day on 9 August Pepple made his debut for The Mariners, starting against Crewe Alexandra in a EFL Cup match.

Pepple's loan was terminated by Grimsby on 12 January 2023, with manager Paul Hurst saying "Bim hasn't had quite as many chances as he would have wished but I'd like to thank him for his time and his efforts with us. You have to remember that it's a big move, coming over from Canada to Luton and then he very quickly joined us on loan. He's a young player that hopefully we've helped develop to a degree and there's still a lot more development to come for him". He had made 15 appearances in all competitions, failing to score a single goal.

==== Return to Luton Town ====
On 7 February 2023, Pepple was involved in Luton's first team for the first time as he was named as a substitute against former team Grimsby Town in a 3–0 defeat in an FA Cup fourth round replay.

==== Loan to Bromley ====
On 18 August 2023, Pepple joined Bromley on loan for the 2023–24 season. On 31 October, he scored a brace in a 4–2 victory over Redbridge FC in the London Senior Cup. On 8 January 2024, he was recalled from his loan by Luton Town, following limited playing time.

==== Loan to Inverness Caledonian Thistle ====
On 1 February 2024, Pepple joined Scottish Championship club Inverness on loan until the end of the season.

==== Loan to Southend ====
On 30 August 2024, Pepple signed for National League team Southend United on a season-long loan. He was recalled in January 2025.

==== Loan to Chesterfield ====
On 12 January 2025, Pepple joined League Two side Chesterfield on loan for the remainder of the season.

=== Plymouth Argyle ===
On 4 July 2025, Pepple signed for League One club Plymouth Argyle for an undisclosed fee. So far he has scored 16 goals in the EFL League One.

== International career ==
Pepple is eligible to represent England, Canada, or Nigeria. He was called up to by the Nigeria national under-17 team in preparation for the 2019 FIFA U-17 World Cup but ultimately decided to represent Canada. In October 2019, Pepple was then called to the Canada national under-17 team for friendlies against Argentina and Mexico.

On 19 March 2026, Pepple received his first senior call-up for the Canada national team.

== Career statistics ==
As of match played October 24, 2026

Club	League	Season	League		Playoffs		National cup (Note: Includes Canadian Championship, FA Cup, Scottish Cup)		League cup (Note: Includes EFL Cup, Scottish League Cup)		Other		Total	
Club	League	Season	Apps	Goals	Apps	Goals	Apps	Goals	Apps	Goals	Apps	Goals	Apps	Goals
Calgary Foothills	USL League Two	2019	11	3	1	1	—		—		—		12	4
Cavalry FC	Canadian Premier League	2019	7	0	1	0	1	0	—		—		9	0
Cavalry FC	Canadian Premier League	2020	6	0	—		—		—		—		6	0
Cavalry FC	Canadian Premier League	2022	7	6	0	0	1	0	—		—		8	6
Cavalry FC	Total		20	6	1	0	2	0	—		0	0	23	6
Luton Town	EFL Championship	2022–23	0	0	—		0	0	—		0	0	0	0
Grimsby Town (loan)	EFL League Two	2022–23	11	0	—		0	0	2	0	2 (Note: Appearances in EFL Trophy)	0	15	0
Bromley (loan)	National League	2023–24	6	0	—		0	0	—		0	0	6	0
Inverness Caledonian Thistle (loan)	Scottish Championship	2023–24	13	1	4	1	1	0	—		0	0	18	2
Southend United (loan)	National League	2024–25	20	10	0	0	2	1	—		2 (Note: Appearances in FA Trophy)	3	23	11
Chesterfield (loan)	EFL League Two	2024–25	20	5	—		0	0	—		1	0	21	5
Plymouth Argyle	EFL League One	2025–26	35	16	—		0	0	2	0	4	2	41	18
Plymouth Argyle	EFL League One	2026–27	12	5	—		0	0	2	1	2	2	16	8
Plymouth Argyle	Total		47	21	—		0	0	4	1	6	4	57	26
Career Total			149	43	6	2	5	1	6	1	10	7	176	54

== Honours ==
Cavalry

- Canadian Premier League Finals runner-up: 2019
- Canadian Premier League (Regular season): Spring 2019, Fall 2019
