= Owen Oseni =

Nigerian footballer (born 2003)

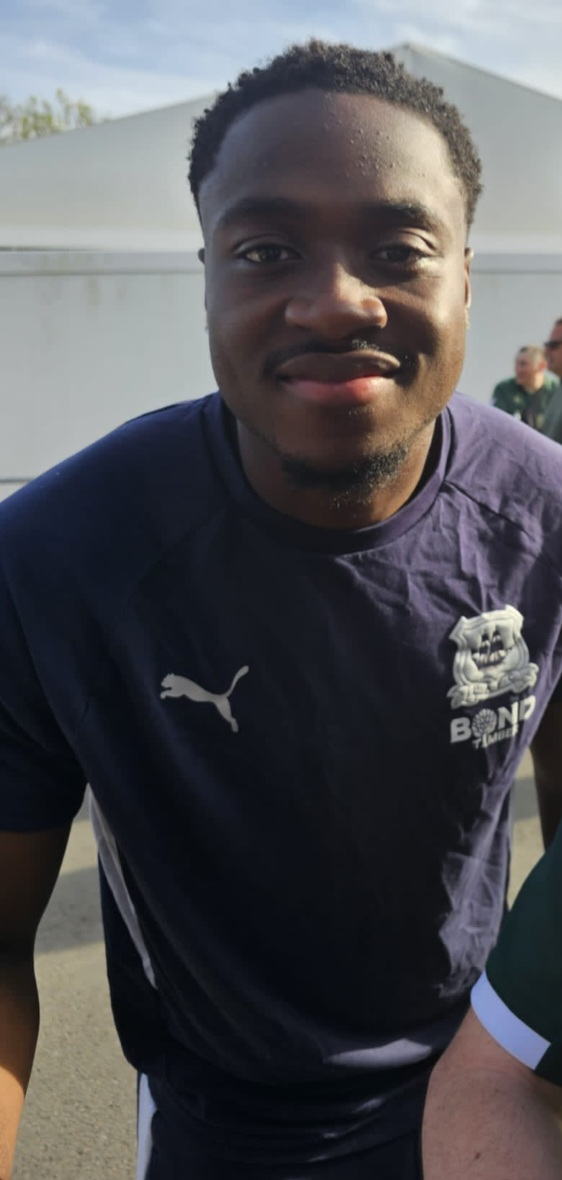
- Oseni with Plymouth Argyle in 2026

Personal information
- Full name: Owen Eric Damilola Oseni
- Date of birth: 7 May 2003 (age 23)
- Place of birth: Waterford, Ireland
- Position: Forward

Team information
- Current team: Plymouth Argyle
- Number: 18

Youth career
- Villa FC
- –2022: Waterford

Senior career*
Years	Team	Apps	(Gls)
2022	Waterford	3	(0)
2023–2024	Derby County	0	(0)
2023	→ Nuneaton Borough (loan)	10	(4)
2024	→ Rushall Olympic (loan)	15	(8)
2024	Gateshead	24	(13)
2025	St Mirren	10	(0)
2025–	Plymouth Argyle	28	(7)

International career^{‡}
2026–	Nigeria	1	(0)
- * Club domestic league appearances and goals as of 12 September 2026 ‡ National team caps and goals as of 26 May 2026

Owen Eric Damilola Oseni (born 7 May 2003) is a professional footballer who plays as a striker for EFL League One club Plymouth Argyle. Born in Ireland, he plays for the Nigeria national team.

== Club career ==
Oseni began his career in Ireland with Villa FC, before entering the youth sector of Waterford, as part of the WWETB FAI Player Development course. Having come through the club's youth ranks, he made his senior debut for Waterford during the 2022 season.

In February 2023, Oseni joined Derby County's academy in England. After loan spells at Nuneaton Borough, where he scored seven goals in 15 appearances, and Rushall Olympic, he was released by Derby County at the end of the 2023–24 season.

On 1 July 2024, Oseni joined National League side Gateshead on a permanent deal, signing a two-year contract. On 10 August 2024, he scored on his competitive debut for the club in a 5–1 win over Ebbsfleet United in the National League. During the first part of the 2024–25 season, he scored a total amount of 13 goals in 28 appearances for Gateshead.

On 1 January 2025, Oseni joined Scottish Premiership club St Mirren for an undisclosed fee, reported to be in the region of £120,000, agreeing to a three-and-a-half year contract in the process. He was immediately included into St Mirren's match-day squad for their away league fixture against Kilmarnock on 2 January, and made his debut as a second-half substitute in the same match, which ended in a 2–0 defeat. On 18 January, he also appeared for the club in the Scottish Cup in a 3–1 away win over Queen of the South.

On 27 June 2025, Oseni joined EFL League One club Plymouth Argyle for an undisclosed fee, signing a two-year deal.

== International career ==
On May 8, 2026, Oseni was called up by Nigeria for the 2026 Unity Cup, becoming the first ever Irish-born player to play for the Super Eagles. Oseni went on to make his full debut on the 26 May 2026, coming off the bench in the 77th minute in a 2–0 win over Zimbabwe.

== Personal life ==
Born in Ireland, Oseni reportedly has dual citizenship of both Ireland and Nigeria. His father is from Nigeria and his mother is from Ivory Coast, which made him eligible to represent either nation, as well as the country of his birth, Ireland.

== Career statistics ==
As of match played 22 September 2026

Appearances and goals by club, season and competition
Club	Season	League			National cup (Note: Includes FAI Cup, Scottish Cup, FA Cup)		League cup (Note: Includes EFL Cup)		Other		Total	
Club	Season	Division	Apps	Goals	Apps	Goals	Apps	Goals	Apps	Goals	Apps	Goals
Waterford	2022	LOI First Division	3	0	1	0	—		0	0	4	0
Derby County	2023–24	League One	0	0	0	0	0	0	—		0	0
Nuneaton Borough (loan)	2023–24	Northern Premier League	10	0	—		—		—		10	0
Rushall Olympic (loan)	2023–24	National League North	15	8	—		—		—		15	8
Gateshead	2024–25	National League	24	12	—		—		—		24	12
St Mirren	2024–25	Scottish Premiership	10	0	1	0	0	0	—		11	0
Plymouth Argyle	2025–26	League One	26	7	1	0	2	2	3 (Note: Appearances in EFL Trophy)	1	32	10
Plymouth Argyle	2026–27	League One	2	0	0	0	0	0	1	0	3	0
Plymouth Argyle	Total		28	7	1	0	2	2	4	1	35	10
Career total			90	27	3	0	2	2	4	1	99	30
