= Sykut =

Sykut is a surname. Notable people with the surname include:

- Maciek Sykut (born 1986), American tennis player
- Patryk Sykut (born 2008), English-Ukrainian footballer
