= Back in Time for... =

British lifestyle television series

- Genre: Factual entertainment
- Directed by: Kim Maddever
- Presented by: Giles Coren (2015–2017); Sara Cox (2018–2020); Alex Jones (2018); Noreen Khan (2022)
- Starring: Polly Russell
- Narrated by: Giles Coren (2015–2017); Sara Cox (2018–2022)
- Country of origin: United Kingdom
- Original language: English
- No. of series: 8 + 2 special series
- No. of episodes: 47

Production
- Executive producers: Alison Kirkham; Leanne Klein
- Producers: Kim Maddever and Emily Sheilds
- Editor: Tom Deverell
- Camera setup: Duncan Stingemore
- Running time: 59 Minutes
- Production company: Wall to Wall

Original release
- Network: BBC Two
- Release: 17 March 2015 – 23 June 2022

Related
- Back in Time for Dinner (CBC, Canada, 2018)

Back in Time for... is a British factual entertainment television series produced by Wall to Wall and broadcast on BBC Two from 17 March 2015 to 23 June 2022. Each series takes one "typical" family or multiple individuals relating to the topic (e.g., factory workers in Back in Time for the Factory) and immerses them in life of past decades.

== Overview ==
The first series, Back in Time for Dinner, centred on the Robshaw family trying foods from the second half of the twentieth century, and experiencing what it was like to live then as a middle-class family. Each hour-long programme covers one decade, and the family's own kitchen, dining, and living rooms were re-designed by the TV team each week to give an accurate representation of what it was like to cook and eat then.

The second series, Back in Time for the Weekend, featured different participants, the middle-class Ashby Hawkins family, spending a week living through different decades from the 1950s to the 1990s and experiencing leisure time from the differing eras.

On 14 and 15 December 2015, a two-part Christmas special titled Back in Time for Christmas was broadcast which featured the Robshaw family trying Christmas food from the 1940s, 1950s and 1960s (Episode 1) and the 1970s, 1980s and 1990s (Episode 2).

A special edition of the show titled Back in Time for Brixton and consisting of two episodes, aired on BBC Two in November 2016. This focused on a black British family called the Irwins "through 60 years of cultural and social shifts, charting the story of how African-Caribbean immigration has changed British culture and society".

A sequel to the first series, titled Further Back in Time for Dinner, returns to the first family, the Robshaws, pushing them half a century earlier, beginning in 1900 and ending in 1949. The series was first broadcast on Tuesday 23 January 2017.

Back in Time for Tea This began airing in February 2018. This series focuses on the food and lifestyle of working-class Northern households, exemplified by the Ellis family, from post-World War I through to the end of the 1990s.

A fifth series, Back in Time for the Factory, consisted of five episodes and aired on BBC Two in September 2018. These episodes looked at modern-day workers experiencing work in a garment factory in the 1960s, 1970s and 1980s, with each episode focusing on a specific year.

A sixth series, entitled Back in Time for School, aired its first episode in January 2019. This series followed a group of students and teachers experiencing school during different time periods from the 1890s to 1990s.

A seventh series, Back in Time for the Corner Shop, began airing in February 2020.

An eighth series, Back in Time for Birmingham was broadcast on BBC Two, and ran for four episodes (over consecutive nights) Monday 20 June till Thursday 23 June 2022. The four episodes featured the Sharma family and was presented by host Noreen Khan and social historian Yasmin Khan. It "follow[ed] a modern-day family of South Asian Brits Back In Time to experience what life in the city would have been like for previous generations."

== Broadcast ==
The series debuted in the UK on BBC Two on 17 March 2015. Internationally, the series premiered in Australia on The LifeStyle Channel on 24 September 2015. The second series began on 2 February 2016.

== Episodes ==
=== Series One – Back in Time for Dinner ===
The first six-episode series was co-presented by restaurant critic Giles Coren and food historian Polly Russell. It followed the Robshaw family - Brandon, his wife Rochelle and their three children, Rosalind, Miranda and Fred.

| Episode | Title | Description | Airdate |
|---|---|---|---|
| 1 | The 1950s | The Robshaws embark on a six-week experiment to discover how a revolution in food transformed the British way of life, guided by records of what people ate for breakfast, lunch and dinner in the decades after the Second World War. Under the guidance of journalist Giles Coren and food historian Polly Russell, they begin by sampling meals from the early 1950s, when rationing was still in effect and staples included dried eggs, national loaf, dripping and liver. With a contribution by Mary Berry. | 17 March 2015 |
| 2 | The 1960s | The Robshaws are transported back to the space-age 1960s, with their home having a fitted kitchen installed and a host of new tastes and flavours to be sampled. Giles Coren and Polly Russell introduce them to the culinary treats of the decade, Including spaghetti bolognese and TV dinners, while Hairy Biker Dave Myers delivers the family their long-awaited fridge and reveals with it the transformative effect of the appliance on his own childhood. Giles also discovers how chicken went from an expensive treat to an everyday staple. | 24 March 2015 |
| 3 | The 1970s | The Robshaws are transported to the 1970s and Mary Berry is on hand to help the family stock up their brand new chest freezer, as frozen and convenience food became a lifesaver for time-pressed working women of the decade. Giles Coren meets the two hippies whose adventures in health food boosted the popularity of houmous, while the family has a go at self-sufficiency and discovers that milking a goat is nowhere near as simple as it looks. | 31 March 2015 |
| 4 | The 1980s | The Robshaws and their home are given a 1980s makeover, with a gadget-filled kitchen including an enormous microwave oven. Giles Coren and food historian Polly Russell use the national food survey to guide the family's diet and introduce them to the culinary treats and trends of the decade, with technology giving them the chance to make their own fizzy drinks and produce a cheese and ham toastie. They also learn about the rise of both nouvelle cuisine and the fast-food chains and find a host of new tastes and flavours from around the globe now available at their local supermarket. | 7 April 2015 |
| 5 | The 1990s | The Robshaws get to grips with the home life and food of the 1990s and start the decade delighting in the vast quantities of food now available from around the globe – but soon realise there are definite downsides to the drive towards cheaper and cheaper food of previous years. Giles Coren and food historian Polly Russell introduce them to the culinary treats of the era, from bagged salad and cook-in sauces to organic veg boxes and the gastro pub. | 14 April 2015 |
| 6 | The Future | After learning all about the food of yesteryear, the Robshaws end their time-travelling eating adventure with Giles Coren and Polly Russell introducing them to some potential tastes of the future. Based on the family's experiences of the way culinary history has unravelled, they also make a few predictions about how people will shop, cook and dine over the next fifty years. | 21 April 2015 |

=== Christmas Specials – Back in Time for Christmas ===
| Episode | Title | Description | Airdate |
|---|---|---|---|
| 1 | The 1940s, 1950s and 1960s | The Robshaw family experience Christmas throughout the decades from the 1940s to the 1960s. | 14 December 2015 |
| 2 | The 1970s, 1980s and 1990s | The Robshaw family continue to time travel through Christmas, visiting the 1970s, 1980s and 1990s. | 15 December 2015 |

=== Series Two – Back in Time for the Weekend ===
The second six-episode series was again co-presented by restaurant critic Giles Coren and food historian Polly Russell. It followed the Ashby-Hawkins family, a couple and their two children.

| Episode | Title | Description | Airdate |
|---|---|---|---|
| 1 | The 1950s | As the Ashby-Hawkins family enter the 1950s, it's goodbye to their flat-screen TV and hello to a piano, some darning and a pipe to keep them amused. It's the era of formality and austerity, as many families bought little more than fags and a spool of thread from week to week. Dad Rob finds out that he's expected to be handy with a tool kit, while mum Steph, who normally works full-time, discovers that it's not her tablet or phone that she misses, but the family's white goods. Without them, she's stuck at home for hours with all the washing, cooking and cleaning expected of a 1950s housewife. But there are upsides – 16-year-old Daisy gets a chance to learn ballroom dancing courtesy of Angela Rippon, who was a teenager in the 1950s, while 12-year-old Seth discovers the joy of the great outdoors, spam fritters included... He and his friends also attend Sunday School, run by Ann Widdecombe. | 2 February 2016 |
| 2 | The 1960s | As the Ashby-Hawkins family enter the 1960s, they get the first-hand experience of the radical spirit of the age as Giles encourages the family to get rid of their piano in smashing 1960s style. With a bit more money to go around, there's more fun to be had – a trip to the seaside, a Dansette record player for Daisy and even their own Mini to enjoy. Special guests help the decade go with a swing. Sir Trevor Brooking joins dad Rob and son Seth for a game of Subbuteo in the dining room, proving that he's a demon on felt as well as grass. Daisy and mum Steph meet Sandie Shaw to discover how the decade's daring fashions reflected the growing freedoms and confidence enjoyed by young people. | 9 February 2016 |
| 3 | The 1970s | The Ashby-Hawkins family strut into the 1970s and discover there were some unexpected upsides to the economic and political turmoil the decade is often remembered for. Rob and Steph share more time together, playing darts with 1970s legend Eric Bristow and taking on some period-appropriate home improvement – cork tiles, anyone? Daughter Daisy lets her hair down at a roller disco with DJ Trevor Nelson, who recalls his own 1970s childhood, and the family receive a visit from Top Gear's original presenter Angela Rippon, bringing them a brand new Renault 5 and the opportunity to go camping, 1970s-style. | 16 February 2016 |
| 4 | The 1980s | The Ashby-Hawkins family embrace the 1980s, where TV and shopping dominated our leisure time. It is also the decade where technology arrives in our homes in a significant way. Kids Daisy and Steph are thrilled by the new VCR and home computer, and there is even a pager for Steph, who is now a shoulder-padded 1980s businesswoman. Dad Rob has got plenty to occupy him – when he is not trying out the kids' CB radio, his home sunbed, or having his highlights done, he is shopping for a Don Johnson makeover with 1980s fashion guru Caryn Franklin. But what does the arrival of all this stuff mean for family life? | 23 February 2016 |
| 5 | The 1990s | The Ashby-Hawkins family enters the 1990s, a decade where new technology arrives at a dizzying pace and increasingly starts to dominate their leisure time. 12-year-old Seth finally gets his hands on a Game Boy and games console, while the arrival of the internet and a mobile phone (albeit in their clunky early guises) marks the start of the road to the 21st Century. It is not all about the tech though – Steph and Rob go all Billy Ray Cyrus and try out line dancing, and 1990s fitness star Mr Motivator pops along to their local gym to put them through their paces. And it couldn't possibly be the 1990s without a tribute to the lifestyle programmes that dominated our TV schedules – Tommy Walsh and Linda Barker turn up to help the whole family give the house and garden a real 1990s makeover... | 1 March 2016 |
| 6 | The Future | The Ashby-Hawkins family discovers what the future might hold for our free time. As they reflect on their time-travelling experience, they also reveal how living in the past has changed how they feel about the present and their hopes for the future too. Changes in technology have driven much of our family's experience, and as they look to the future they discover new ways in which technology may go on to further transform our leisure time. The family get their hands on some robotic housework help a world away from Steph's 1950s mangle, and she and Rob try out a very futuristic gym fad – immersive fitness. Steph embraces some cutting-edge technology that takes him away from his screens, giving them the freedoms of the past with all the computer power of the 21st century. And Daisy gets to try out an innovative camera that records her day without cutting her off from her friends. But in the end, it's time spent together as a family that is the most important to all of them. As they look back and forward into the future, the Ashby-Hawkins family realise that no matter what incredible technological innovations await us, it's free time enjoyed together that we'll always treasure. | 8 March 2016 |

=== Black and British specials – Back in Time for Brixton ===
| Episode | Title | Description | Airdate |
|---|---|---|---|
| 1 | The 1940s, 1950s and 1960s | The Irwin Family give up their modern lives for one summer to experience what life was like for Caribbeans who immigrated to Britain in the postwar period. Beginning in 1948, the year the Empire Windrush arrived at Tilbury and discharged its passengers, the Irwin family travel through the 1950s and 1960s, guided by presenter Giles Coren and social historian Emma Dabiri who introduce them to their new homes as well as the events of the time. Along the way, the Irwins discover the food, work and entertainment of first-generation immigrants making their lives in Brixton. In 1959, the whole family get a lesson in the 1950s steel pan from EastEnders star Rudolph Walker, and in 1962, dad Weininger gets some fashion tips from 1960s singer Kenny Lynch. In 1966, mum Janice embraces her role as a nurse at a time when the NHS recruited directly in the West Indies for staff. As the family's living situation improves over the years, they decide to see the 1960s out with a blues party. | 21 November 2016 |
| 2 | The 1970s, 1980s and 1990s | In episode two, the Irwin family leave the 1960s behind to enter the 1970s and go on to discover how a new generation of black Britons forged their way through the next three decades of British history. The family buy their first house. In 1976, the family bat an over with cricketing legend Sir Clive Lloyd and learn about the famous cricket tour in which Sir Clive led West Indies to victory. Moving forward to the 1980s, the Irwins reflect on the Brixton Riots, Lovers Rock star Janet Kay brings a gift to the Irwin's home and the family join her in a singalong. To see out the decade, daughters Breanne and Tiana invite their friends along to experience a typical party in 1989 style with DJ and producer Jazzie B. Finally, the family experience the Notting Hill Carnival in 1999 as they reflect on what they have learnt from their time-travelling experience. | 28 November 2016 |

=== Series Three – Further Back in Time for Dinner ===
The third six-episode series was again co-presented by restaurant critic Giles Coren and food historian Polly Russell. Series Three saw the return of the Robshaw Family, as they journey even further back into the 20th Century.

| Episode | Title | Description | Airdate |
|---|---|---|---|
| 1 | The 1900s | The Robshaw family experience life at the turn of the 20th century, and discover how the food people ate and the way they consumed it helped shape the modern family. An ordinary house in South London will be their time machine, transporting them through five decades and two world wars. Guided by presenters Giles Coren and social historian Polly Russell, they'll trace the changes to Britain's diet and the extraordinary social transformation they reveal. Monica Galetti and Chas and Dave make guest appearances. | 24 January 2017 |
| 2 | The 1910s | The Robshaw family enter the turbulent 1910s and the First World War turns all their lives upside down, putting Rochelle back in the kitchen instead of servant Debbie. Never a natural cook, she struggles to feed the family as supplies start to run out and the war puts an end to their previously carefree lives. However, the decade has its positives too with the freedom of a bike ride and an idyllic picnic, and a visit from celebrity chef John Torode – but even he cannot salvage something tasty from 1918's fish sausages. | 31 January 2017 |
| 3 | The 1920s | The Robshaw family enter the 1920s, sampling their first taste of the racy reputation of the decade as they host a jazz-age party fuelled by a menu of 14 different cocktails. The period has something new for everyone, with sweet treats for Fred, spicy food for Brandon in a 1920s curry house and the kicks and tricks of the Charleston for Miranda and Ros with former Strictly Come Dancing stars James and Ola Jordan. | 7 February 2017 |
| 4 | The 1930s | The family discover a surprising decade of progress and optimism as they journey through the 1930s, with their larder now stuffed with familiar brands and snacks. Brandon and Rochelle take a trip out for dinner in their very first family car and there is popcorn to go with their own home cinema, but the family's old servant Debbie finds out that the 1930s brought hard times for working women such as her. However, as 1939 comes around the family's hopes for the future are dashed as their final party is interrupted by a historic radio announcement. Guest appearances by Jilly Goolden and Ainsley Harriott. | 14 February 2017 |
| 5 | The 1940s | The Robshaws enter the 1940s and experience a decade dominated by war and entirely fuelled by rations, including powdered egg, nettles on toast and imitation brawn. They are even one family member down as Fred is evacuated to the countryside, but the war brings them together too as they share a Woolton pie in their very own Anderson shelter, the girls go dancing with Debbie and some GIs, and they all start to recognise how the family meal to bring them together in the good and bad times. | 21 February 2017 |
| 6 | The Present | The family reflect on their time travels, discovering that much of what they experienced in the past, still lives on around our dinner tables today. Polly Russell shows them the delights of a contemporary canned meal, and Brandon and Rochelle sample a Peruvian dinner with co-presenter Giles Coren. Finally, the Robshaws share a celebratory meal with Giles and Polly as they realise how many of our historical eating habits are still a treasured part of modern family mealtimes. | 28 February 2017 |

=== Series Four – Back in Time for Tea ===
The fourth six-episode series was co-presented by Sara Cox, with returning food historian Polly Russell. It followed the Ellis family from Bradford, a couple and their three children. The family was joined by guests throughout the episodes, some who lived the times, for specific cultural references.

| Episode | Title | Description | Airdate |
|---|---|---|---|
| 1 | The 1920s and 1930s | The Ellis family discover how life has changed for ordinary working families in the north of England over the last 100 years. Jon, Lesley, Caitlin, Freya and Harvey experience the lives of previous generations, from the food people ate to the jobs they did and how they enjoyed themselves. It opens just after the end of the First World War, and the north is on the cusp of great transformation. Presenter Sara Cox and social historian Polly Russell introduce the family to 1918 living, and Anita Rani introduces them to the pleasures of rambling, 1930s-style. | 6 February 2018 |
| 2 | The 1940s and 1950s | The post-war years see the Ellis family on rations without a fridge, hot water or an electric cooker. Thrifty fodder includes the regional favourites cow heel pie and Yorkshire pudding made with dried eggs, and while the cost of food is low, family spirits are high. The insecurity of the hungry 1930s has been replaced by the promise of a fairer society for working-class families with government commitment to full employment and better housing and healthcare. Plus, two new family members – chickens Sara and Polly – treat them to fresh eggs. | 13 February 2018 |
| 3 | The 1960s | The Ellis family enjoys the new freedoms of the 1960s, from steak and chips and caravan holidays to muscle man competitions. Cameras follow dad as he puts in a shift down the local pit, while mum and girls head to the local phone box to try the new telephone recipe service. | 20 February 2018 |
| 4 | The 1970s | The Ellises sample life in the 1970s, an age of power cuts and strikes, but also a golden era for working-class families. They enjoy rare time together helped with the advent of their first record player and car, while actress Claire Sweeney brings "Scouse", her family's speciality, round for tea. | 27 February 2018 |
| 5 | The 1980s and 1990s | The Ellises sample life in the 1980s and 1990s, and experience their first home telephone, chest freezer and toastie maker. The girls also absorb the Manchester music scene with Shaun Ryder, before the family have a millennium party. Guest appearance of TV chef Marcus Wareing. | 6 March 2018 |
| 6 | The Present | The Ellis family reflects on their time-travelling adventure and explores how the legacy of 100 years of history lives on in the northern diet today. Lesley and Sara Cox visit a Liverpool bakery, and sisters Caitlin and Freya examine how recent changes on Manchester's Curry Mile affect people's evolving relationship with flavour. Finally Sara and northern chef Rob Owen Brown prepare a celebration meal for the family. | 13 March 2018 |

=== Series Five – Back in Time for the Factory ===
The fifth five-episode series was presented by Alex Jones. It followed the Brabon family from Rhondda in Wales and focused on factory workers throughout the decades of the second half of the 20th century, this time spending each episode in a specific year rather than a whole decade.

| Episode | Title | Description | Airdate |
|---|---|---|---|
| 1 | 1968 | Fifty years ago, 34 per cent of the British population worked in manufacturing. Factories mostly employed women, who made an array of clothes and household items that were sold all over the world. Alex Jones presents this documentary in which a group of modern workers go back in time to learn what life was like for women through the 1960s to the 1980s. They start in a re-creation of 1968 when the bulk of high street clothes were made in the UK. The reality of the production line is a rude awakening for many - long monotonous hours with short breaks and few distractions - a situation made even worse when they open their pay packets. | 6 September 2018 |
| 2 | 1973 | The year has moved on to 1973 when manufacturing output and productivity was at their highest since the war. The women are tasked with bright orange flares, a must-have fashion item of the decade, and with business booming, targets have to be met. However, when a male machinist joins the production line, his end-of-week pay packet sends shockwaves around the factory. | 13 September 2018 |
| 3 | 1976 | Time moves on for the volunteers from 1973 to 1976, when disco was dominating the dance floors and maxi dresses were in vogue. It was also a time of great hope for women, with the Sex Discrimination Act having just been passed and the Equal Pay Act now in force. But will the changes in the law lead to equality on the factory floor or will the workers' hopes be dashed once again? | 20 September 2018 |
| 4 | 1983 | The women go back to 1983 to learn how an unsung army of female workers fought to keep their jobs in the face of foreign competition. A change in government at the end of the 1970s had brought a dramatic change in economic policy. The Conservatives' policy of encouraging businesses to stand on their own two feet without financial support from the government meant that many of the factories in the south Wales valleys began to struggle. Throughout the early 1980s, big companies closed their factories and those that managed to stay open were battling against the steady march of globalisation and cheap labour abroad. | 27 September 2018 |
| 5 | The Present | Over the past four weeks, 18 volunteers have experienced what life was like for the factory girls of the south Wales valleys in the 1960s, 1970s and 1980s. Now some of the women who lived through it for real talk about their lives, speaking of terrifying bosses, everyday sexism, union battles, camaraderie and of lifelong friendships forged on the production line. | 4 October 2018 |

=== Series Six – Back in Time for School ===
Fifteen pupils and three teachers embark on an extraordinary time-travelling adventure to discover just how much life at school has changed over the past 100 years. The school itself is their time machine, transporting them through seven eras of British history - from Victorian grandeur and the age of Empire through a postwar grammar, a 1960s secondary modern, and finally the dawning of the digital revolution in the 1980s and 1990s. The first three episodes were filmed at Bablake School in Coventry. The next four episodes were shot at Arden Academy, Solihull. The last episode that went back to the present day was filmed at various schools around the Midlands.

| Episode | Title | Description | Airdate |
|---|---|---|---|
| 1 | 1895-1914 | Starting at the very close of Victoria's reign they discover how national attitudes to class, race and gender filtered into the classroom, before entering the turbulent years between the World Wars. They experience lessons that seem bizarre by modern standards - from musket practice and mother-craft to deportment and duck herding - and take part in activities that we all remember from our own school days. | 3 January 2019 |
| 2 | 1918-1939 | The First World War is over in episode two of this social history experiment, but although the authorities are putting more emphasis on education, having realised how many soldiers couldn't read or decipher maps, there hasn't been any radical change. Girls are still taught mothercraft, while the boys learn physics. Married female teachers are sacked to employ more men. Interestingly, depriving the modern-day female students of subjects such as science or football makes them even keener to do them. There are glimmers of a more modern approach, but as one teacher concludes, most postwar education was extremely regimented – reflecting army life, perhaps. | 10 January 2019 |
| 3 | 1945-1959 | In the bright new era after the Second World War, the revolutionary plan was to educate every child according to their potential. So they’d receive either an academic education or a vocational one. Grammar-school pupils (the brightest 25 per cent) were expected to become the next generation of leaders, despite the dreary teaching style of “chalk and talk”. When the youngsters are asked about their grammar-school experience, it occasionally feels like they're having words put into their mouths, but what's really illuminating is hearing Joan Bakewell describe how passing the 11-plus exam had a divisive effect on her family. | 17 January 2019 |
| 4 | The 1960s | In the swinging 1960s, the class experience bricklaying, typing, cooking and even a spot of Mini driving. If you failed the 11-plus in the 1960s, you went to a secondary modern school where education was tailored to serve the industry. Forty per cent of the curriculum was devoted to practical lessons such as bricklaying, typing and farm work but while there was a move towards pupil-centred learning, horizons were still limited for the girls. Even though the young volunteers generally enjoy this semi-vocational style of teaching, they're shocked how one exam totally shaped pupils’ lives and expectations. Only one in 22,000 secondary modern students went on to university. | 24 January 2019 |
| 5 | The 1970s | Throughout this social-history experiment it's been shocking how the female students and teachers have been treated differently to the males. You might hope that now they've reached the 1970s, with its comprehensive education system, that would change. But despite being heralded by Sara Cox as a decade of innovation, progressiveness and self-expression, job choices for girls were still limited and even worksheets on decimalisation were gender-specific. Schools without rules is not a resounding success, although one youngster's dream comes true when he finally gets to eat curry for his school dinner. | 7 February 2019 |
| 6 | The 1980s | The youngsters are really enjoying this experiment now it's reached the 1980s, partly because they have some knowledge of the decade through their parents, and partly because the teaching style is closer to what they get now. The music is familiar, there's new technology (albeit very basic computers), interactive learning and – to several pupils’ delight – chips served for school dinner. Although they're shocked that it's taken until the 1980s to abolish corporal punishment in schools, they seem less concerned by the country's high unemployment figures and dire warnings about Aids. | 14 February 2019 |
| 7 | The 1990s | The pupils and teachers arrive in their final time-travelling decade, the 1990s. Although the 1990s might seem a bit too much like recent history for a time-travelling series, there's plenty to get nostalgic about, whatever your age: girl power, Tamagotchis, dial-up internet and – to a lesser extent perhaps – the culinary delight that is potato smiley faces. This is the final decade of education the volunteer pupils will experience, and one of the highlights for them is – a visit from a Gladiator. Careers are increasingly important, so the youngsters try out an online career-matching website. There are some surprising results. The children are also ready to embrace girl power, Brit-pop, Oasis and Blur, Mr Blobby and the Gladiators. | 21 February 2019 |
| 8 | The Present | Having experienced the changes in education over the course of a century, there's only one thing left for the 15 pupils and their teachers: a school reunion. As well as sharing their favourite memories with presenter Sara Cox and social historian Polly Russell, they also explore what the education of the future might be like. | 28 February 2019 |

=== Series Seven – Back in Time for the Corner Shop ===
The Ardern family embark on an extraordinary time-travelling adventure - going back in time to run that great British institution, the corner shop. Sara Cox returned as a presenter alongside Polly Russell.

| Episode | Title | Description | Airdate |
|---|---|---|---|
| 1 | Victorian | The Arderns start their time-travelling adventure running a Victorian corner shop, discovering how life behind the counter reflects two decades of incredible social change. The said shop was found at 55 Derbyshire Lane, in Meersbrook, Sheffield | 25 February 2020 |
| 2 | 20s, 30s, 40s | The Arderns continue their time travelling journey into the 20s, 30s and 40s. | 3 March 2020 |
| 3 | 50s & 60s | The shop moves from a serving counter to a self-service layout. | 10 March 2020 |
| 4 | 1970s | Decimalisation arrives at the shop. The Arderns are visited by comedian Sanjeev Kohli. | 17 March 2020 |
| 5 | 80s & 90s | Faced with the rise of supermarkets, the shop introduces convenience food and National Lottery tickets. The shop is also visited by ABC frontman Martin Fry. | 24 March 2020 |
| 6 | Future | The Arderns shopkeeping adventure continues into the modern day. | 31 March 2020 |

=== Series Eight – Back in Time for Birmingham ===
The series covers the lives of British Asians from the 1950s onward and will be broadcast over four nights from the 20 June 2022.

| Episode | Title | Description | Airdate |
|---|---|---|---|
| 1 | 50s & 60s | Covers the arrival of South Asian immigrants to Britain | 20 Jun 2022 |
| 2 | 70s | The explosion of South Asian entrepreneurship | 21 Jun 2022 |
| 3 | 80s & 90s | Increased affluence, the second generation finding their feet. Racism and the National Front | 22 Jun 2022 |
| 4 | 21st century | Reflection on how things have changed for Asians in the UK and where they may head in the future | 23 Jun 2022 |

== International adaptations ==
- An Australian version of Back in Time for Dinner, hosted by Annabel Crabb, premiered on ABC on 29 May 2018. Starting in 1950 in Australia, the seven part series features the Ferrone family, mother Carol, father Peter, 17-year-old son Julian, 14-year-old daughter Sienna and 10-year-old daughter Olivia. A second season Further Back in Time for Dinner premiered on 1 September 2020. Starting in 1900 in Australia, the five part series features the Ferrone family again. A third season Back in Time for the Corner Shop premiered on 7 March 2023. Starting from 1850 to 1990 in Australia, the five part series features the Ferrone family once more as they navigate life as corner shop owners.
- A Canadian version of Back in Time for Dinner, hosted by Carlo Rota, premiered on CBC Television on 14 June 2018 to 19 July 2018. Starting in 1940 in Canada and finished in 1990s, the seven part series features the Campus family, mother Tristan, a registered nurse, father Aaron, a multimedia designer, 18-year-old daughter Valerie, 17-year-old daughter Jessica and 15-year-old son Robert. A one-hour Christmas special, Back in Time for Christmas, also featuring the Campus family and following them celebrating Christmas from the 1940s to the 1990s, premiered on CBC Television on 6 December 2019.
- A second Canadian programme, titled Back in Time for Winter, premiered on CBC Television on 9 January 2020. The series follows the Carlson family, mother Melanie, father Dave, and three daughters, 16-year-old Lauren, 13-year-old Alexandrea, and 12-year-old Chelsey, as they experience a Canadian winter each decade from the 1940s to the 1990s.
- Back to the Frontier, a competition series in which contestants attempt to live historically accurate lives for the American frontier era while building their own houses with period-appropriate resources, was announced as entering development in 2024 for Max.
