= Giles Coren =

British food critic, television presenter (born 1969)

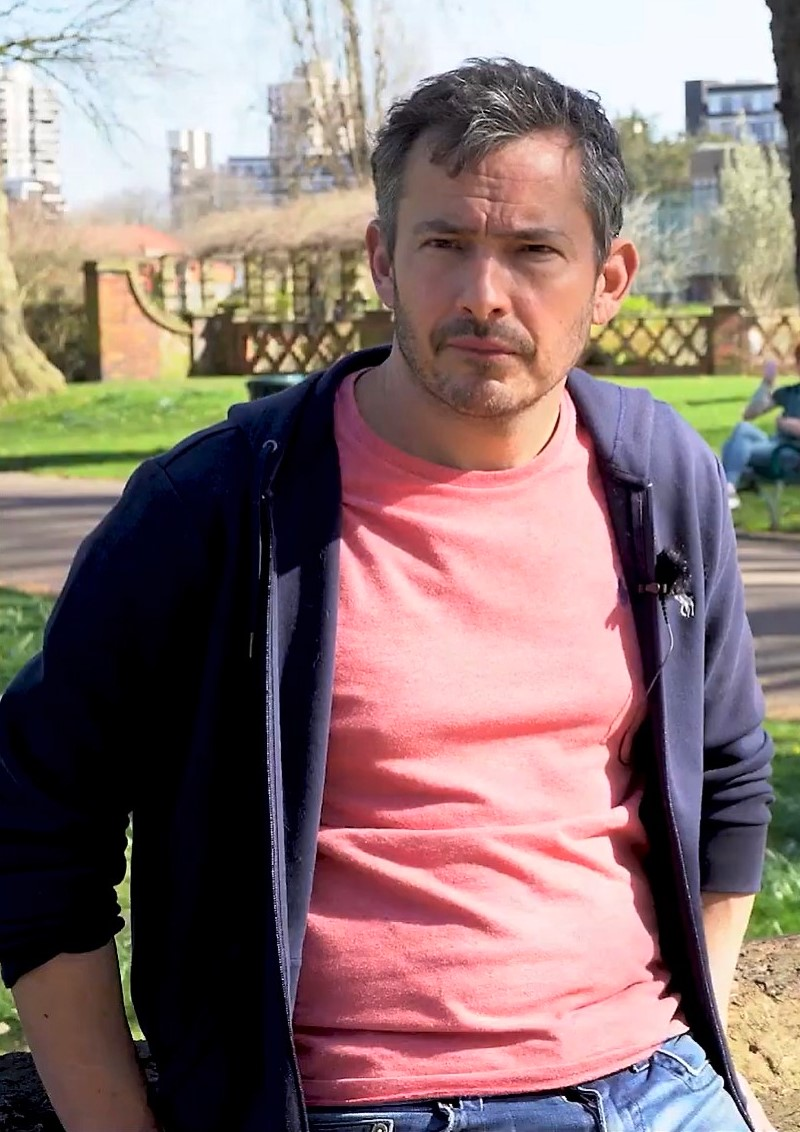
- Coren in 2021
- Born: Giles Robin Patrick Coren; 29 July 1969 (age 57); Paddington, London, England
- Education: The Hall School, Hampstead, London; Westminster School, London
- Alma mater: Keble College, Oxford
- Occupations: Food critic, journalist, TV presenter and writer
- Employer(s): BBC, ITV and The Times
- Spouse: Esther Walker (m. 2010)
- Children: 2
- Parents: Alan Coren; Anne Kasriel
- Relatives: Victoria Coren Mitchell (sister); Michael Coren (first cousin once removed)

Giles Robin Patrick Coren (born 29 July 1969) is a British columnist, food writer and television presenter. He has been a restaurant critic for The Times newspaper since 2002, and was named Food and Drink Writer of the Year at the British Press Awards in 2005.

== Early life ==
Coren was born in Paddington, London, the only son of English journalist and humourist Alan Coren and Anne (née Kasriel). His parents were both raised in Orthodox Jewish households, but his own upbringing was more liberal. He is the elder brother of journalist and TV presenter Victoria Coren Mitchell and is also related to journalist Michael Coren.

== Education ==
Coren was educated at The Hall School, an independent boys' junior school in Hampstead, London, and at Westminster School, an independent boys' senior school in Central London, followed by Keble College at the University of Oxford, where he was awarded a first-class degree in English.

== Writing ==
=== Journalism ===
Coren has been a restaurant critic for The Times since 2002, having previously been a restaurant critic for Tatler magazine and The Independent on Sunday. He was named Food And Drink Writer of the Year at the 2005 British Press Awards and in 2016 was named Restaurant Writer of the Year at the Fortnum and Mason Awards. As well as his restaurant work, he also contributes a regular column to The Times, the subjects of which range from personal life to politics. Under the pseudonym Professor Gideon Garter he wrote The Intellectual's Guide to Fashion for The Sunday Times.

According to a paper published in Journalism Practice by Dr Peter English and Dr David Fleischman, Coren is "a sharp, witty columnist who can write with tongue in cheek". According to an English study, the average grade that Coren has given restaurants in his reviews in The Times was 6.86. Coren claims that his average score is actually 6.3, but should be 5; however, he produces "no more than half a dozen really bad" reviews a year.

Coren has also written for GQ, and in November 2014, he joined Time Out as a columnist, writing weekly on city life.

=== Books ===
Coren is credited by inventor James Dyson as having collaborated with him on his autobiography, published in 1997.

In 2005, he published his first novel, Winkler, reviewed in the New Statesman and The Independent. One section of the novel won the Literary Review's Bad Sex in Fiction Award.

Coren has also written two non-fiction books: Anger Management (For Beginners), a compilation of columns that he had written for The Times, which was published in 2010, and How To Eat Out, which was published in 2012.

Coren is the editor of the dining guide Truth, Love & Clean Cutlery: A Guide to the Truly Good Restaurants and Food Experiences of the UK.

== Television ==
In 2005, Coren appeared as a regular correspondent on Gordon Ramsay's The F Word. In June 2006, he presented a programme on More4, entitled Tax the Fat, about clinical obesity and the cost that it presents to the NHS. In 2010, he co-starred with comedianne Sue Perkins in a programme called Giles and Sue Live The Good Life, based on the 1970s comedy The Good Life.

Coren co-presented the Channel 4 series Animal Farm with Dr Olivia Judson in March 2007. Around the same time, he appeared in a series of television commercials advertising Birds Eye frozen foods. Also in 2006, Coren presented the film and DVD review programme Movie Lounge.

With comedian Sue Perkins, Coren co-starred in a series of documentaries known as The Supersizers.... In the first, Edwardian Supersize Me (BBC Four, 2007), the two spent a week on the diet of a wealthy Edwardian (i.e. pre-WWI) couple. The second series (The Supersizers Go...) broadcast in May 2008 on BBC Two. The 2009 series, The Supersizers Eat..., covered the cuisine of the 1980s, the 1950s, 1920s, the French Revolution, Medieval culture, and ancient Rome.

In 2012, Coren presented Our Food on the BBC, travelling the country talking about various local foods. In 2013, he presented Passover - Why is this night different? for BBC1 and co-presented (alongside Alexander Armstrong) 12 Drinks of Christmas for the same channel. In 2014, Coren ventured to North America. First, he filmed Pressure Cooker, a cooking competition show co-hosted by Anne-Marie Withenshaw and Chuck Hughes, produced by Jamie Oliver’s Fresh One Productions and Bristow Global Media, and broadcast on Canada's W Network and the US FYI Network. Coren followed that up with Million Dollar Critic for BBC America, which premiered on 22 January 2015 directly after Gordon Ramsay's New Kitchen Nightmares.

In 2015, Coren began a new BBC series, co-presented with social historian Polly Russell. Back in Time for Dinner, six-hour-long programmes broadcast from March 2015 Back in Time for Dinner achieved a BAFTA nomination in the 'Features' category. Back in Time for Christmas (Christmas food) and Back in Time for the Weekend (leisure activities) followed. In 2016, Coren filmed Back in Time for Brixton and Further Back in Time for Dinner and the two were released in 2016 and 2017 respectively.

Eat to Live Forever was shown in March 2015.

In 2016, Coren fronted the one-off documentary My Failed Novel for Sky Arts. For the same channel, he co-hosted eight-part series Fake! The Great Masterpiece Challenge alongside art historian Rose Balston. In 2016, he presented 500 Questions, a four-part primetime game show on ITV. The series is taken from the US where it aired on ABC. Created by Mark Burnett, it was described as "an intense battle of brainpower that will test even the smartest of contestants".

In 2017, he presented Amazing Hotels: Life Beyond the Lobby alongside Monica Galetti. A second series aired in 2018, a third in 2020 and a fourth in 2021–22. Coren's departure from Amazing Hotels was announced in 2022.

== Radio ==
Between September 2019 and July 2020, Coren presented a weekly programme on Talkradio, on Sundays from 7pm to 10pm. Between July 2020 and December 2021, he presented a weekly programme on Times Radio, on Friday afternoons.

== Controversies ==
=== Leaked e-mail to subeditors ===
On 23 July 2008, The Guardian's media blog published an email from Coren to sub-editors at The Times. Coren's internal Times email used profanity, the use of which he defends, to take issue with a colleague's removal of an indefinite article (an "a") from his piece, which he believed ruined a joke in his last line. Coren said a joke was lost in the change from "a nosh" (meaning fellatio) to "nosh"—a word derived from Yiddish meaning "food", which he doubted his editors knew better than he. The Daily Telegraph said the incident was "not the first time the critic has been caught out writing abusive emails to colleagues". The exchange was reprinted in the American magazine Harper's in October 2008.

=== Polish controversy ===
In his next article, dated 26 July 2008, Coren said his Jewish ancestors had been persecuted by Poles. He stated that Poles used to burn Jews in synagogues for entertainment at Easter and that Poland is in denial about its role in the Holocaust. He referred to immigrant Poles as "Polacks", arguing that "if England is not the land of milk and honey it appeared to them three or four years ago, then, frankly, they can clear off out of it".

Coren's comments led to a complaint to the Press Complaints Commission, an early day motion in the Parliament of the United Kingdom, and a critical editorial in The Economist. Coren responded: "I wrote in passing that the Poles remain in denial about their responsibility for the Holocaust. How gratifying, then, to see so many letters in The Times in the subsequent days from Poles denying their responsibility for the Holocaust." He also told The Jewish Chronicle: "Fuck the Poles". After the Press Complaints Commission rejected their complaint because the criticism had been of a group rather than an individual, the Federation of Poles in Great Britain (FPGB) lodged a complaint with the European Court of Human Rights.

Professor Gábor Halmai of the EU Fundamental Rights Agency said "I completely share the criticisms" of the piece made by The Economist. He said that amid an internal debate about an FRA response, a colleague had said "it is not even certain that what Coren stated with regard to his past had taken place at all". Halmai responded that while the generalisation used by Coren was unacceptable, it was protected under freedom of expression, conceding the existence of the Jedwabne, Krakow and Kielce pogroms.

=== Mediawatch complaint over Twitter posting ===
On 14 January 2010, Coren attracted criticism after he posted on his Twitter feed: "Next door have bought their 12-year-old son a drum kit. For fuck's sake! Do I kill him then burn it? Or do I fuck him, then kill him then burn it?" Vivienne Pattison, director of watchdog Mediawatch UK, condemned the remark as "very bad taste". Coren later posted: "Oh hell's bells. Look, can I just say I didn't kill the kid, or have sex with him. And anyway he's not real. And I live in Vienna."

=== Privacy injunction and alleged contempt of court ===
On 13 May 2011, Coren attracted controversy after joking about a privacy injunction by posting on his Twitter account: "god, ANOTHER injunction tonight. another footballer. and SUCH a boring one. fucking shit midfielder... he's yet another very ugly married man who's been carrying on with a gold-digging flopsie he should have seen coming a MILE away". Then on 14 May he tweeted "Gareth Barry looks remarkably relaxed when you consider that... first touch for Gareth Barry... not according to what I've heard... time for a bet. what chance Barry to score? tiny fiver on barry to score at 22–1. wdv been nice to get a double with Giggs in the match before... Barry's been pulled off...". This was later deleted but was archived.

On 22 May 2011, it was reported that lawyers at Schillings acting for an England footballer had persuaded the High Court judge Mr. Justice Tugendhat to ask the Attorney General for England and Wales, Dominic Grieve, to consider the criminal prosecution of "a top journalist" over a matter that breached a privacy injunction. Coren acknowledged on Twitter that he could face jail for contempt of court, saying: "A funny fucking day. The support of twitter has been almost tear-jerking. But I am afraid there won't be room for all of us in the cell. xxx." On 23 May 2011, Liberal Democrat Member of Parliament John Hemming spoke in the House of Commons and used parliamentary privilege to identify Coren as the person involved, leading to an immediate rebuke from Speaker of the House of Commons John Bercow. In an interview with The Sunday Times on 29 May 2011, Hemming stated that he considered naming both footballers in the Coren controversy, before the Speaker stopped him. Hemming commented that the Speaker was "probably right to do so", and added: "I couldn't be guaranteed his family didn't know, whereas Giggs' name had been chanted on the terraces."

According to The Daily Telegraph, the Premier League footballer identified by Coren in the tweets was not Ryan Giggs, and was known in the privacy injunction by the pseudonym TSE. The case at the High Court of Justice was TSE & ELP v News Group Newspapers Ltd, with TSE being described as "a married footballer" who had been involved in an extra-marital relationship with a woman known as ELP. Neither person had wished The Sun to publish the details of the relationship. The injunction was granted on 13 May 2011 by Mr. Justice Tugendhat, who accepted claims from the footballer that publication of the details of the relationship "would provoke the cruel chants of supporters." Tugendhat said that aspects of the case had been published on "various electronic media, including Twitter", but added: "the fact that these publications have occurred does not mean that there should be no injunction in this case".

=== Accusations of misogyny against a journalist ===
In 2012, Coren responded to criticism from then Huffington Post journalist Alice Vincent with the words, "go fuck yourself, you barren old hag." Vincent had said a recent column by Coren about his newborn daughter was a "yawn" and "one step up from a mumsnet blogpost." Coren's response sparked accusations of misogyny and sexism.

=== Fake Polish Twitter account ===
In December 2018, it was discovered that Giles Coren had an alternative Twitter account that "he once used to suggest people critical of him were motivated by antisemitism". The account purported to belong to a Polish plumber, with a bio composed in broken English and Coren's book cover as avatar.

=== Tweets after the death of Dawn Foster ===
In July 2021, following the death of the journalist Dawn Foster, Coren tweeted the following:

"When someone dies who has trolled you on Twitter, saying vile and hurtful things about you and your family, is it okay to be like, 'I am sorry for the people who loved you, and any human death diminishes me, but, HA HA HA HA HA HA'?"

The tweet was quickly deleted but was screen-grabbed and widely shared online. There was speculation that Coren was upset because of a tweet Foster had written about him that read, "Giles Coren a prime example of how the 'if I've heard of yer da, I don't need to hear from you' rule holds for almost every man bar Jesus." Coren's comments stirred considerable controversy, with several figures in the media criticising him, and some calling for him to lose his jobs with The Times and Times Radio. The press regulator IPSO received several complaints but took no action. Coren's home in North London was daubed in graffiti reading "Dawn Foster forever", and dog excrement was reportedly left at the property.

=== Popeyes review controversy ===
In January 2022, The Times magazine published Coren's review of a new Popeyes branch in Stratford, East London. Coren wrote that "exploiters" of fried chicken recipes in chain restaurants had brought "obesity, sloth, waste, [and] high street degradation" to white communities. In the article Coren wrote:

Isn't fried chicken, in a weird way, a form of race revenge? The thrusting young economies of West Africa now must surely look at a KFC bargain bucket and high-five themselves that their ancestors had the forethought, all those years ago, to provide the means by which white culture would one day poison itself to death.

The Independent's race correspondent, Nadine White, tweeted: "A review of the new London Popeyes restaurant in The Times. Fried chicken = Black people = sloth, waste, degradation."

== Personal life ==
Coren married Esther Walker in 2010, after courting for three years. A journalist, author and food blogger, she is the elder daughter of Angus Walker, chairman of Hampstead Garden Suburb Trust. The couple has a daughter and a son and live in Kentish Town.

Coren drives a Jaguar I-Pace car, which has been stolen more than once.

== Bibliography ==
- Coren, Giles Winkler; London: Jonathan Cape Ltd, 2005
- Coren, Giles Anger Management for Beginners: A Self-Help Course in 70 Lessons; London: Hodder & Stoughton, 2010
- Coren, Giles How to Eat Out: Lessons from a Life Lived Mostly in Restaurants; London: Hodder & Stoughton, 2012
