= Archie Collins =

English footballer (born 1999)

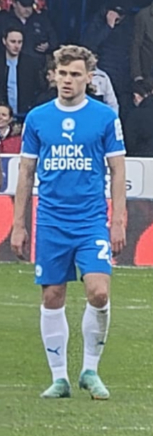
- Collins with Peterborough United in 2024

Personal information
- Full name: Archie Finn Collins
- Date of birth: 31 August 1999 (age 27)
- Place of birth: Taunton, England
- Height: 5 ft 9 in (1.74 m)
- Position: Midfielder

Team information
- Current team: Huddersfield Town
- Number: 8

Youth career
- Exeter City

Senior career*
Years	Team	Apps	(Gls)
2017–2023	Exeter City	191	(10)
2017	→ Weston-super-Mare (loan)	8	(1)
2017–2018	→ Dorchester Town (loan)	14	(2)
2023–2026	Peterborough United	129	(6)
2026–	Huddersfield Town	12	(0)
- * Club domestic league appearances and goals as of 11:58, 22 November 2026 (UTC)

Archie Finn Collins (born 31 August 1999) is an English professional footballer who plays as a midfielder for EFL League One club Huddersfield Town.

== Early and personal life ==
Collins was born in Taunton, and grew up in Bridgwater.

== Career ==
=== Exeter City ===
Collins began his career with Exeter City, turning professional in April 2017.

Collins joined Weston-super-Mare on loan in August 2017, making 8 league appearances, scoring 1 goal. He joined Dorchester Town on loan in December 2017, which was extended in January 2018, and again in February 2018. For Dorchester he scored 2 goals in 14 league appearances.

Collins made his debut for Exeter City on 28 November 2017, in the Football League Cup.

=== Peterborough United ===
On 28 June 2023, Collins signed for Peterborough United for a six-figure transfer fee, on a three-year contract. He made his debut for the club on 5 August 2023, in a 1–0 win against Reading. He scored his first goal for the club on 30 September 2023, in a 2–0 win against Bristol Rovers.

He departed the club upon the expiry of his contract at the end of the 2025–26 season.

=== Huddersfield Town ===
On 13 August 2026, Collins signed a two-year contract with fellow EFL League One club Huddersfield Town.

== Playing style ==
Collins has been described by Exeter City as a "versatile player who can play up front, just behind the striker, wide right, wide left or in central midfield".

== Career statistics ==
As of match played 21 November 2026

Club	Season	Division	League		FA Cup		League Cup		Other		Total	
Club	Season	Division	Apps	Goals	Apps	Goals	Apps	Goals	Apps	Goals	Apps	Goals
Exeter City	2017–18	League Two	0	0	0	0	0	0	1 (Note: Appearances in EFL Trophy)	0	1	0
Exeter City	2018–19	League Two	26	1	1	0	2	0	4	0	33	1
Exeter City	2019–20	League Two	36	1	4	0	1	0	4 (Note: One appearance in EFL Trophy, three appearances in League Two play-offs)	0	45	1
Exeter City	2020–21	League Two	46	4	2	0	1	0	0	0	49	4
Exeter City	2021–22	League Two	38	0	4	0	0	0	2	2	44	2
Exeter City	2022–23	League One	45	4	2	1	2	1	0	0	49	6
Exeter City	Total		191	10	13	1	6	1	11	2	221	14
Weston-super-Mare (loan)	2017–18	National League South	8	1	0	0	—		0	0	8	1
Dorchester Town (loan)	2017–18	SFL Premier Division South	14	2	0	0	—		0	0	14	2
Peterborough United	2023–24	League One	44	3	4	1	2	0	7 (Note: Five appearances in the EFL Trophy, two appearances in the League One play-offs)	0	57	4
Peterborough United	2024–25	League One	40	1	3	0	1	0	8	0	52	1
Peterborough United	2025–26	League One	45	2	2	0	1	1	2	0	50	3
Peterborough United	Total		129	6	9	1	4	1	17	0	159	8
Huddersfield Town	2026–27	League One	12	0	0	0	0	0	2	0	14	0
Career total			354	19	21	2	10	2	30	2	416	25

== Honours ==
Exeter City

- EFL League Two second-place promotion: 2021–22

Peterborough United

- EFL Trophy: 2023–24, 2024–25
