= David Kamara =

English footballer

Personal information
- Full name: David Joy Gbashai Kamara
- Date of birth: 4 January 2006 (age 20)
- Place of birth: Peckham, England
- Height: 1.85 m (6 ft 1 in)
- Position: Striker

Team information
- Current team: Tranmere Rovers (on loan from Peterborough United)
- Number: 24

Youth career
- –2022: Welling United

Senior career*
Years	Team	Apps	(Gls)
2022–2024	Welling United	11	(2)
2024–	Peterborough United	9	(2)
2025	→ King's Lynn Town (loan)	7	(0)
2025–2026	→ Harborough Town (loan)	14	(5)
2026–	→ Tranmere Rovers (loan)	0	(0)
- * Club domestic league appearances and goals as of 17:43, 1 September 2026 (UTC)

David Joy Gbashai Kamara (born 4 January 2006) is a footballer who plays as a forward for EFL League Two club Tranmere Rovers on loan from EFL League One club Peterborough United.

== Career ==
Kamara was born in the London Borough of Lambeth and attended St Joseph's Catholic Primary School in Rotherhithe. He began his career at Welling United, coming through the academy ranks before making his debut in a 1–0 London Senior Cup victory over Cray Valley Paper Mills. The next season, he would score his first goal for the Wings in a 3–2 league victory over Havant & Waterlooville.

Kamara's performances attracted attention from Football League sides, with him holding trials at both Gillingham and Peterborough United, as well as interest from Luton Town. However, it would be Peterborough that would confirm the signing of Kamara on 10 June 2024.

Kamara made his senior debut on 8 October 2024, coming on as a substitute for Abraham Odoh in a 2–0 EFL Trophy victory over Stevenage.

On 10 October 2025, Kamara joined Enterprise National League North side King's Lynn Town on an initial one-month loan

On 12 November 2025, Kamara signed a new long-term contract at Peterborough until 2029. The following day Kamara joined Harborough Town on loan until the end of the season

On 1 September 2026, Kamara joined League Two side Tranmere Rovers on loan until the end of the season.

== International career ==
Kamara is of Sierra Leonean descent. He was called up, along with 20 other foreign-based players, to the provisional Sierra Leone U20 squad in preparation for the 2025 U-20 Africa Cup of Nations.

== Career statistics ==
As of match played 6 April 2026

Appearances and goals by club, season and competition
Club	Season	League			FA Cup		EFL Cup		Other		Total	
Club	Season	Division	Apps	Goals	Apps	Goals	Apps	Goals	Apps	Goals	Apps	Goals
Welling United	2022–23	National League South	0	0	0	0	–		2 (Note: One appearance in London Senior Cup, one appearance in Kent Senior Cup)	0	2	0
Welling United	2023–24	National League South	11	2	0	0	–		1 (Note: Appearances in FA Trophy)	1	12	3
Welling United	Total		11	2	0	0	0	0	3	1	14	3
Peterborough United	2024–25	League One	0	0	0	0	0	0	2 (Note: Appearances in EFL Trophy)	0	2	0
Peterborough United	2025–26	League One	7	2	0	0	0	0	0	0	7	2
Peterborough United	Total		7	2	0	0	0	0	2	0	9	2
King's Lynn Town (loan)	2025–26	National League North	7	0	0	0	–		0	0	7	0
Harborough Town (loan)	2025–26	Southern League Premier Division Central	14	5	0	0	–		2	1	16	6
Career total			39	9	0	0	0	0	7	2	46	11

== Honours ==
Peterborough United

- EFL Trophy: 2024–25
