= Brandon Khela =

English footballer (born 2005)

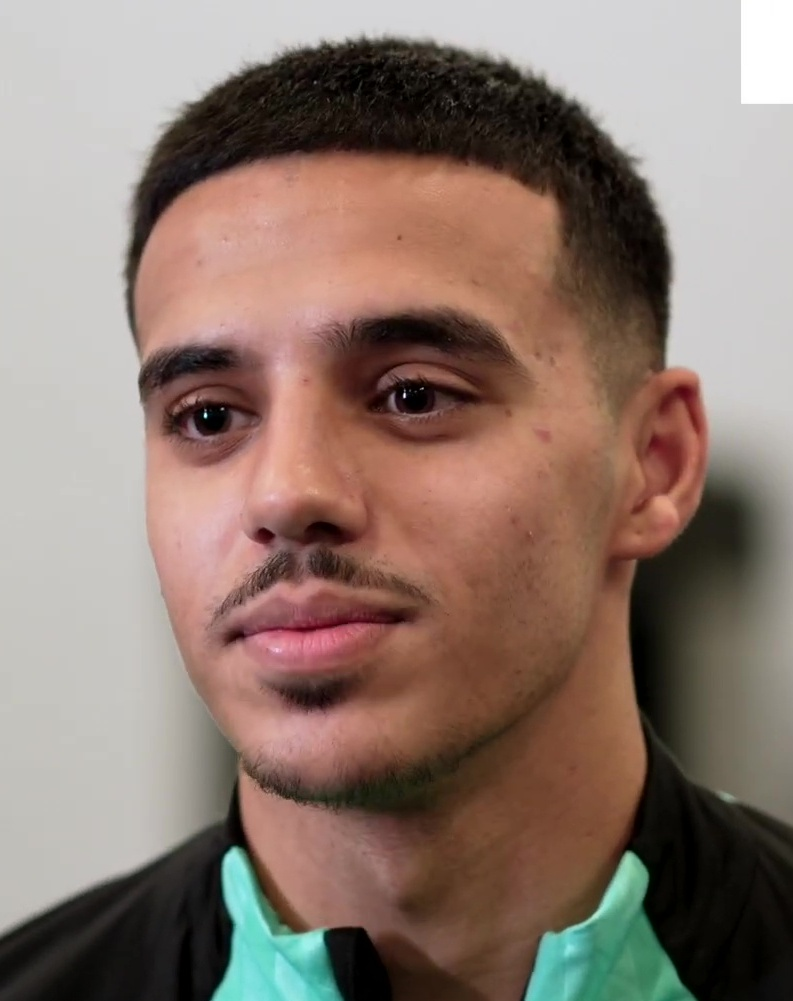

Personal information
- Full name: Brandon Singh Khela
- Date of birth: 19 January 2005 (age 21)
- Place of birth: Coventry, England
- Height: 6 ft 1 in (1.85 m)
- Position: Midfielder

Team information
- Current team: Peterborough United
- Number: 8

Youth career
- 2014–2023: Birmingham City

Senior career*
Years	Team	Apps	(Gls)
2023–2025	Birmingham City	3	(0)
2024	→ Ross County (loan)	14	(0)
2025	→ Bradford City (loan)	15	(0)
2025–	Peterborough United	43	(3)

International career
2022	England U17	2	(0)
- * Club domestic league appearances and goals as of 17:18, 10 October 2026 (UTC)

Brandon Singh Khela (born 19 January 2005) is an English professional footballer who plays as a midfielder for EFL League One side Peterborough United. Khela came through the academy of Birmingham City and in 2022 became the first British South Asian to sign a professional contract with that club. He spent the second half of the 2023–24 season on loan at Scottish Premiership club Ross County and the second half of the following season with Bradford City, with whom he gained promotion from League Two. In international football, he has represented England at under-17 level.

== Early life and youth career ==
Khela was born in Coventry, West Midlands. He grew up in a Punjabi family in Birmingham and was introduced to football at a young age by his father, Dov Khela. He attended Arden Academy in Solihull.

He joined Birmingham City's academy as an eight-year-old, and took up a scholarship with the club in 2021. According to the under-18s lead coach Martyn Olorenshaw, Khela "is a creator and scorer of many goals for the team from behind the forwards and his technical ability continues to improve. Brandon also has a fantastic engine on him which makes his defensive work important to the team as well." In the 2021–22 season, Khela played in 14 league matches for Birmingham's U18s as well as 8 for Steve Spooner's development squad. He also trained with the first team, was included in the matchday squad by manager Lee Bowyer for the EFL Championship visit to Stoke City in February 2022, and received a call-up to the England U17 team.

== Club career ==
=== Birmingham City ===
Khela signed his first professional deal with Birmingham City, to begin in July 2022. Olorenshaw highlighted his attitude and work ethic, which "he backs up ... with serious talent". Khela's signing was celebrated as a significant milestone in the club's history and a source of inspiration for young British South Asians who aspire to play at the highest level.

Khela was included in the party for the first-team's pre-season training camp in Spain in July 2023, and on 8 August 2023, he made his senior debut, replacing Keshi Anderson in the 81st minute of a 2-0 EFL Cup victory over Cheltenham Town at Whaddon Road. He made his first Championship appearance on 3 October as a late substitute in a 4–1 win at home to Huddersfield Town. He was a regular in the matchday squad for the first three months of the season, and signed a three-and-a-half-year contract in November 2023, but made no further appearances for the first team.

==== Ross County (loan) ====
Khela joined Scottish Premiership club Ross County on 12 January 2024 on loan for the rest of the season. He made his debut on 27 January, starting and playing the first hour of the visit to Celtic, who scored in the first minute and held on to their lead, and kept his place for the next match, but was used off the bench for all but one of his remaining 13 appearances. On 14 April, he came on as a late substitute with Ross County leading Rangers 3–1; although he conceded an 89th-minute penalty for handball, his team held on to beat Rangers for the first time in their history.

Ross County finished 11th in the table, which meant they faced a play-off against Scottish Championship promotion candidates Raith Rovers to determine which would play in the Premiership next season. With a 2–1 lead from the first leg, Ross County were 3–0 up in the second when Khela entered the match after 76 minutes. Ten minutes later, he scored his first senior goal to confirm a 4–0 win. According to the Daily Record's commentary, "[Will] Nightingale is denied as his header at the back post hits the post, before rebounding for substitute Khela, who does brilliantly to work the ball out of the congestion and send a lovely left-foot drive into the corner."

==== Return to Birmingham City ====
Under new manager Chris Davies, Khela played regularly in pre-season, and his versatility earned him selection for the opening matchday squad at home to Reading in League One. In the next fixture, away to Charlton Athletic in the EFL Cup, he made his first start for Birmingham, playing at left back in the absence of Lee Buchanan (injured) and Alex Cochrane (rested). After 32 minutes, he scored what proved to be the only goal of the match, bending the ball round the goalkeeper from well outside the penalty area. His arms-outstretched celebration mirrored that of his former youth team-mate Jude Bellingham, who also scored the only goal of the match away at Charlton on his full debut. Davies confirmed Khela's integration within the first team squad for the season: "I just thought his mindset and the conversation I had with him really showed me, for such a young guy, there's a real maturity there and a real desire to be here and play for this club. He can cope physically as well and he's obviously been up to Ross County to play men's football, and he's decent on the ball and the attitude is exceptional so I have been really impressed."

==== Bradford City (loan) ====
Khela made six appearances for Birmingham in the first half of the 2024–25 season before joining League Two club Bradford City on 3 January 2025 on loan for the remainder of the campaign. It took time for him to work his way into the team, but he then started ten matches in March and April, initially standing in for the hospitalised Alex Pattison alongside captain Richie Smallwood in central midfield and then partnering Pattison with Smallwood suspended. According to the Bradford Telegraph & Argus season summary, Khela "showed an old head on very young shoulders" as his team gained promotion to League One.

=== Peterborough United ===
On 24th June 2025, Khela signed for EFL League One side Peterborough United on a four year deal with an option for a fifth.

== International career ==
In May 2022, he was called up to the England U17 squad to face Norway and the United States in friendly matches in Marbella. He played in both matches, coming on as a substitute in the 3–0 win against Norway on 4 June and starting in the 2–1 loss to the United States four days later.

== Personal life ==
Khela is a Sikh. Khela's signing with Birmingham City was recognised as a historic moment in British football and a source of inspiration for young footballers of South Asian descent. He has stated that he wants to be a role model for British South Asians in football.

== Career statistics ==
As of match played 7 February 2026

Appearances and goals by club, season and competition
Club	Season	League			National cup (Note: Includes FA Cup, Scottish Cup)		EFL Cup		Other		Total	
Club	Season	Division	Apps	Goals	Apps	Goals	Apps	Goals	Apps	Goals	Apps	Goals
Birmingham City	2021–22	Championship	0	0	0	0	0	0	—		0	0
Birmingham City	2022–23	Championship	0	0	0	0	0	0	—		0	0
Birmingham City	2023–24	Championship	1	0	0	0	1	0	—		2	0
Birmingham City	2024–25	League One	2	0	1	0	1	1	2 (Note: Appearance(s) in EFL Trophy)	0	6	1
Birmingham City	Total		3	0	1	0	2	1	2	0	8	1
Ross County (loan)	2023–24	Scottish Premiership	14	0	0	0	—		1 (Note: Appearance in Scottish Premiership play-offs)	1	15	1
Bradford City (loan)	2024–25	League Two	15	0	—		—		—		15	0
Peterborough United	2025–26	League One	25	2	2	0	1	0	4	0	32	2
Career total			57	2	3	0	3	1	7	1	70	2
