= 2025–26 Peterborough United F.C. season =

92nd season in existence of Peterborough United FC

Peterborough United
2025–26 season
- Owner: Darragh MacAnthony (75%), Kelgary Sports & Entertainment (20%), IRC Investments Limited (5%)
- Chairman: Darragh MacAnthony
- Manager: Darren Ferguson (until 25 October); Luke Williams (from 29 October)
- Stadium: Weston Homes Stadium
- League One: 18th
- FA Cup: Second round
- EFL Cup: First round
- EFL Trophy: Second round
- Top goalscorer: League: Harry Leonard (16 goals); All: Harry Leonard (17 goals)
- Highest home attendance: 10,827 (9 August 2025 vs. Luton Town)
- Lowest home attendance: 1,929 (30 September 2025 vs. Aston Villa U21s)
- Average home league attendance: 8,125
- Biggest win: 6–1 (7 February 2026 vs. Wigan Athletic)
- Biggest defeat: 5–2 (4 January 2026 vs. Lincoln City)
Home colours	Away colours	Third colours

The 2025–26 season was the 92nd season in the history of Peterborough United Football Club, and their fourth consecutive season in League One. In addition to the domestic league, the club also participated in the FA Cup, the EFL Cup, and the EFL Trophy.

== Managerial changes ==
On 25 October, Darren Ferguson was sacked following the 2–1 home defeat to Blackpool. Four days later, Luke Williams was appointed as the new manager on a three-year contract.

== Transfers and contracts ==
=== In ===
Date	Pos.	Player	From	Fee	Ref.
1 June 2025 (Note: The transfer was announced on 29 May, and would become official on June 1 once the transfer window had reopened)	LW	(England) Kyrell Lisbie	(England) Braintree Town	Undisclosed	
10 June 2025	RW	(England) Declan Frith	(Switzerland) FC Thun	Undisclosed	
24 June 2025	CB	(England) Sam Hughes	(England) Stockport County	Undisclosed	
24 June 2025	CM	(England) Brandon Khela	(England) Birmingham City	Undisclosed	
30 June 2025	GK	(England) Alex Bass	(England) Notts County	Undisclosed	
21 July 2025	CB	(Republic of Ireland) David Okagbue	(England) Walsall	Undisclosed	
1 August 2025	AM	(Greece) Klaidi Lolos	(England) Bolton Wanderers	Undisclosed	
14 August 2025	CM	(New Zealand) Matthew Garbett	(Netherlands) NAC Breda	Free	
16 August 2025	CB	(England) Tom Lees	(England) Huddersfield Town	Free	
18 August 2025	CM	(England) Ben Woods	(England) Accrington Stanley	Undisclosed	
1 September 2025	CF	(England) Harry Leonard	(England) Blackburn Rovers	Undisclosed	
13 January 2026	RW	(England) Ejiro Abbey *	(England) Binfield	Undisclosed	
2 February 2026	LB	(The Gambia) Jacob Mendy	(Wales) Wrexham	Free	

- Signed initially for the Under 21s

=== Out ===
Date	Pos.	Player	To	Fee	Ref.
23 June 2025	LB	(England) Jack Sparkes	(England) Bristol Rovers	Free	
28 June 2025	RW	(Ghana) Kwame Poku	(England) Queens Park Rangers	£900,000	
2 July 2025	CB	(England) Emmanuel Fernandez	(Scotland) Rangers	Undisclosed	
2 July 2025	LW	(Jamaica) Malik Mothersille	(England) Stockport County	Undisclosed	
1 August 2025	CB	(England) Ollie Rose	(England) Scunthorpe United	Undisclosed	
1 September 2025	LB	(England) Davon Gbajumo	(England) Southampton	Undisclosed	
3 January 2026	CM	(England) Ryan de Havilland	(England) Bristol Rovers	Undisclosed	
14 January 2026	CF	(Sweden) Gustav Lindgren	(Sweden) BK Hacken	Undisclosed	

=== Loaned in ===
Date	Pos.	Player	From	Date until	Ref.
31 July 2025	GK	(Chile) Vicente Reyes	(England) Norwich City	1 January 2026	
22 August 2025	RB	(Democratic Republic of the Congo) Peter Kioso	(England) Oxford United	30 June 2026	
1 September 2025	CF	(England) Jimmy-Jay Morgan	(England) Chelsea	30 June 2026	
1 September 2025	CB	(Republic of Ireland) Tom O'Connor	(Wales) Wrexham	2 February 2026 (Note: On 2 February, O'Connor's initial season-long loan from Wrexham was terminated due to injury)	
1 September 2025	LB	(The Gambia) Jacob Mendy	(Wales) Wrexham	30 June 2026	

=== Loaned out ===
Date	Pos.	Player	To	Date until	Ref.
7 July 2025	CF	(England) Pemi Aderoju	(England) Eastbourne Borough	1 January 2026 (Note: On 1 January, Aderoju was recalled from his loan at Eastbourne)	
1 September 2025	CF	(England) Bradley Ihionvien	(England) Shrewsbury Town	30 June 2026	
9 October 2025	CAM	(Northern Ireland) Chris Conn-Clarke	(England) Carlisle United	30 June 2026 (Note: On 7 January, Conn-Clarke's loan at Carlisle United was extended until the end of the season)	
10 October 2025	CF	(England) David Kamara	(England) King's Lynn Town	8 November 2025	
11 October 2025	RW	(England) Andre Changunda	(England) Harborough Town	8 November 2025	
21 November 2025	CM	(Wales) Joe Andrews	(England) Bedford Town	20 December 2025	
28 November 2025	RW	(England) Andre Changunda	(England) AFC Totton	3 January 2026	
28 November 2025	RB	(England) Noah Freeman	(England) Spalding United	3 January 2026	
9 January 2026	AM	(Greece) Klaidi Lolos	(England) Crawley Town	30 June 2026	

=== Released / Out of Contract ===
Date	Pos.	Player	Subsequent club	Join date	Ref.
30 June 2025	RW	(England) David Ajiboye	(England) Carlisle United	1 July 2025	
30 June 2025	LB	(England) Aaron Powell	(England) Peterborough Sports	1 July 2025	
30 June 2025	RW	(Ghana) Kwame Poku	(England) Queens Park Rangers	1 July 2025	
30 June 2025	LB	(England) Tayo Edun	(England) Stockport County	1 July 2025	
30 June 2025	CF	(England) Ricky-Jade Jones	(Germany) St. Pauli	1 July 2025	
30 June 2025	DM	(Cyprus) Hector Kyprianou	(England) Watford	1 July 2025	
30 June 2025	CF	(England) Kabongo Tshimanga	(England) Crawley Town	1 July 2025	
30 June 2025	CB	(England) Jenson Sumnall	(England) Stourbridge	1 July 2025	
30 June 2025	AM	(England) Ma'kel Campbell	(England) Morecambe	23 August 2025	
30 June 2025	CB	(Republic of Ireland) Justin Osagie	(England) Chelsea	13 October 2025	
30 June 2025	GK	(England) Jed Steer	Retired		
30 June 2025	CM	(England) Tyler Young	(England) Ipswich Town	3 September 2025	
2 October 2025	CB	(Sweden) Oscar Wallin	Retired		
2 February 2026	GK	(England) Will Blackmore	Mutual consent		
2 February 2026	GK	(Australia) Nicholas Bilokapic	Mutual consent		

== Pre-season and friendlies ==
On 4 June, Peterborough United announced three pre-season fixtures against Stamford, Boston United and Grimsby Town. Six days later, a fourth friendly was confirmed against Peterborough Sports. A fifth friendly was later added, against Leicester City. On 13 June, Posh added a sixth fixture to the schedule against King's Lynn Town. Four days later, a seventh friendly was added, against Colchester United.

A behind-closed-doors fixture against Notts County was also announced which was later cancelled and replaced with a game at MK Dons.

Win Draw Loss Fixtures

5 July 2025 Friendly	Leicester City	3–1	Peterborough United	Seagrave
12:30 BST	Page 63' 78'; S.Thomas 89'		Conn-Clarke 73'	Stadium: Seagrave Training Ground; Referee: James Bell

8 July 2025 Friendly	Stamford	0–6	Peterborough United	Stamford
19:30 BST		Report	Lisbie 3'; Ihionvien 14' (pen.) 22'; Wallin 17'; Freeman 61' (o.g.); Conn-Clarke 82'	Stadium: Zeeco Stadium; Attendance: 1,771

12 July 2025 Friendly	Ipswich Town	0–1	Peterborough United	Rushmere St Andrew
12:00 BST		Report	Ihionvien	Stadium: Playford Road; Attendance: 0 (behind closed doors)

15 July 2025 Friendly	Peterborough Sports	1–8	Peterborough United	Peterborough
19:45 BST	Booth 39'; Fox (yellow card) 70'		Ihionvien 2' 40' 46'; Odoh 42'; Mills 49'; Lindgren 64' 85'; Nevett (yellow card) 70'; Lisbie 89'	Stadium: PIMS Park; Attendance: 1,349; Referee: Neil Hair

18 July 2025 Friendly	King's Lynn Town	1–1	Peterborough United	King's Lynn
19:00 BST	Gyasi 7'; Wilson (yellow card) 31'; Maja (yellow card) 57'		Clunan 45' (o.g.); Lisbie (yellow card) 80'	Stadium: The Walks; Attendance: 1,186

19 July 2025 Friendly	Boston United	0–1	Peterborough United	Wyberton
15:00 BST			Lindgren 9'; Mills (yellow card) 84'	Stadium: Boston Community Stadium; Attendance: 1,505; Referee: Zac Kennard-Kettle

22 July 2025 Friendly	Peterborough United	Cancelled	Notts County	Peterborough
13:30 BST				Stadium: Bespoke Builds Training Ground
Note: Fixture was cancelled and replaced with another fixture.

22 July 2025 Friendly	Milton Keynes Dons	1–2	Peterborough United	Denbigh
19:30 BST	Collins 13'		Conn-Clarke 82'; Collins 87'	Stadium: Stadium MK; Attendance: Neil Hair; Referee: 2,171

25 July 2025 Friendly	Colchester United	2–2	Peterborough United	Colchester
19:00 BST	Williams 28'; Flanagan (yellow card) 42'; Tovide 67'		Hughes 20'; Frith 27'; Ihionvien (yellow card) 42'	Stadium: JobServe Community Stadium

26 July 2025 Friendly	Grimsby Town	3–2	Peterborough United	Cleethorpes
15:00 BST	Kabia 15'; Vernam 38' (pen.); Sweeney 90'		Hayes 73'; Fox 85'	Stadium: Blundell Park; Attendance: 1,814

== Competitions ==
=== League One ===
==== League table ====
Pos	Team	Pld	W	D	L	GF	GA	GD	Pts
16	Wigan Athletic	46	14	14	18	49	58	−9	56
17	Burton Albion	46	13	15	18	50	60	−10	54
18	Peterborough United	46	15	8	23	64	68	−4	53
19	AFC Wimbledon	46	15	8	23	51	72	−21	53
20	Leyton Orient	46	14	10	22	59	71	−12	52

Source: EFL Official Website
Rules for classification: 1) Points; 2) Goal difference; 3) Number of goals scored; 4) Head-to-head results; 5) Wins; 6) Away goals; 7) Penalty points (sec 9.5); 8) 12-point sending off offences

==== Results summary ====
Overall								Home						Away					
Pld	W	D	L	GF	GA	GD	Pts	W	D	L	GF	GA	GD	W	D	L	GF	GA	GD
46	15	8	23	64	68	−4	53	8	6	9	39	30	+9	7	2	14	25	38	−13

Last updated: 2 May 2026.
Source: Soccerway

==== Results by round ====
Round	1	2	3	4	5	6	7	8	9	10	11	13	14	15	17	12^{1}	18	19	20	21	22	23	24	25	26	27	28	29	30	31	16^{2}	32	33	34	35	37	38	39	41	42	43	36^{3}	44	45	40^{4}	46
Ground	A	H	A	H	H	A	A	H	A	H	A	A	H	H	H	H	A	A	H	A	H	H	A	A	H	H	A	A	H	H	A	A	A	H	A	A	H	A	A	H	A	H	H	A	H	H
Result	L	L	L	L	D	L	L	W	W	L	L	W	L	W	W	L	L	W	W	W	W	D	W	L	W	L	W	L	L	W	W	L	L	D	D	L	W	D	L	D	L	L	D	L	D	L
Position	15	21	23	24	24	24	24	24	23	23	24	23	24	22	21	21	21	21	19	16	13	14	11	12	10	12	9	10	12	12	8	10	11	12	11	14	13	12	14	13	16	16	17	17	17	18

Source: EFL
A = Away; H = Home; W = Win; D = Draw; L = Loss; P = Postponed
Notes:
- ^{1} Matchday 12 (vs Stevenage) was postponed due to the international call-ups.
- ^{2} Matchday 16 (vs Mansfield Town) was postponed due to the international call-ups.
- ^{3} Matchday 36 (vs Port Vale) was postponed due opposition in FA Cup fifth round involvements.
- ^{4} Matchday 40 (vs Mansfield Town) was postponed due to the international call-ups.

==== Matches ====
Win Draw Loss Fixtures

2 August 2025 1	Cardiff City	2–1	Peterborough United	Cardiff
12:30 BST	Lawlor (yellow card) 25'; R.Colwill 48'; Tanner (yellow card) 53'; Kpakio 60'; Bagan (yellow card) 67'	Report	Ihionvien 33' (pen.); Mills (yellow card) 85'	Stadium: Cardiff City Stadium; Attendance: 19,615; Referee: Benjamin Speedie

9 August 2025 2	Peterborough United	0–2	Luton Town	Peterborough
12:30 BST	Okagbue (yellow card) 62'; Khela (yellow card) 82'	Report	Andersen 60' (yellow card) 72'; Wells (yellow card) 84'; Clark 85'	Stadium: Weston Homes Stadium; Attendance: 10,827; Referee: Scott Oldham
Note: Fixture was originally scheduled for a 15:00 kick-off, but was moved live Sky Sports broadcasting.

16 August 2025 3	Wigan Athletic	2–0	Peterborough United	Wigan
15:00 BST	Saydee 5'; Kerr 28'; Trevitt (yellow card) 58'	Report	Ihionvien (yellow card) 57'; Hayes (yellow card) 90+2'	Stadium: Brick Community Stadium; Attendance: 8,748; Referee: Stephen Parkinson

19 August 2025 4	Peterborough United	0–1	Barnsley	Peterborough
19:45 BST	Frith (yellow card) 90+2'	Report	Vickers 44'; Watson (yellow card) 58'; Earl (yellow card) 68'	Stadium: Weston Homes Stadium; Attendance: 7,148; Referee: Scott Jackson

23 August 2025 5	Peterborough United	1–1	Bradford City	Peterborough
15:00 BST	Collins (yellow card) 12'; Hayes 90+1'	Report	Baldwin (yellow card) 34'; Swan 55'	Stadium: Weston Homes Stadium; Attendance: 8,874; Referee: James Durkin

30 August 2025 6	Exeter City	3–0	Peterborough United	Exeter
15:00 BST	Wareham 31'; Doyle-Hayes (yellow card) 49'; Aitchison (yellow card) 64'; Magennis 65' 68'; Fitzwater (yellow card) 80'	Report	Nevett (yellow card) 9'; Garbett (yellow card) 45+1'	Stadium: St James Park; Attendance: 6,239; Referee: Matthew Corlett

6 September 2025 7	Huddersfield Town	3–2	Peterborough United	Huddersfield
15:00 BST	Kane (yellow card) 46' (goal) 67'; Alves 60'; Taylor 90+1'	Report	Morgan 47'; Hayes 90+8'	Stadium: Kirklees Stadium; Attendance: 16,383; Referee: Martin Coy

13 September 2025 8	Peterborough United	2–1	Wycombe Wanderers	Peterborough
15:00 BST	Garbett 21'; Morgan 41'; Khela (yellow card) 53'; Nevett (yellow card) 64'; Hayes (yellow card) 90'	Report	Onyedinma 49'; Harvie (yellow card) 69'	Stadium: Weston Homes Stadium; Attendance: 8,595; Referee: Jacob Miles

20 September 2025 9	Plymouth Argyle	0–1	Peterborough United	Plymouth
15:00 BST	Mitchell (yellow card) 18'; Finn (yellow card) 67'; Sorinola (yellow card) 77'	Report	Leonard (penalty missed) 23'; Khela (yellow card) 28'; Morgan 31'; Garbett (yellow card) 76'	Stadium: Home Park; Attendance: 15,994; Referee: James Linington

27 September 2025 10	Peterborough United	0–3	Lincoln City	Peterborough
15:00 BST		Report	Reach 15'; Darikwa 60' (yellow card) 74'; McGrandles (yellow card) 76'; Obikwu 86'	Stadium: Weston Homes Stadium; Attendance: 9.943; Referee: Thomas Parsons

4 October 2025 11	Bolton Wanderers	2–1	Peterborough United	Horwich
15:00 BST	Burstow 6' 21'; Sharman-Lowe (yellow card) 88'; Forino (yellow card) 90+5'	Report	Kioso (yellow card) 26' (goal) 41'; Nevett (yellow card) 63'; Lisbie (yellow card) 88'	Stadium: Toughsheet Community Stadium; Attendance: 20,336; Referee: Seb Stockbridge

18 October 2025 13	Burton Albion	0–1	Peterborough United	Burton upon Trent
12:30 BST	Delap (yellow card) 55'; Armer (yellow card) 59'		Morgan (yellow card) 24'; Lees (yellow card) 35' (yellow-red card) 81'; O'Connor (yellow card) 42'; Collins 65'	Stadium: Pirelli Stadium; Attendance: 3,786; Referee: Sam Bell
Note: Fixture was originally scheduled for a 15:00 kick-off, but was rescheduled for live Sky Sports broadcasting.

25 October 2025 14	Peterborough United	1–2	Blackpool	Peterborough
15:00 BST	Garbett 44'; Mills (yellow card) 45+5'; Khela (yellow card) 63'; Collins (yellow card) 69'	Report	Ashworth (yellow card) 29'; Kioso 35' (o.g.); Fletcher (yellow card) 45+5'; Brown (yellow card) 60'; Evans (yellow card) 81'; Banks 85'	Stadium: Weston Homes Stadium; Attendance: 8,315; Referee: Sam Mulhall

8 November 2025 15	Peterborough United	5–0	AFC Wimbledon	Peterborough
15:00 GMT	Leonard 11' 16' (pen.); O'Connor (yellow card) 22'; Lisbie 36'; Kioso (yellow card) 48'; Lindgren 77' 90+3'		Ogundere (yellow card) 15'	Stadium: Weston Homes Stadium; Attendance: 9,827; Referee: Simon Mather

20 November 2025 17	Peterborough United	3–0	Stockport County	Peterborough
20:00 GMT	Woods 5'; Leonard (yellow card) 9'; Lisbie 37'; Khela 76'		Connolly (yellow card) 13'	Stadium: Weston Homes Stadium; Attendance: 6,861; Referee: Matt Russell
Note: Fixture was originally scheduled for 22 November, but was rescheduled for live Sky Sports broadcasting.

25 November 2025 12	Peterborough United	0–1	Stevenage	Peterborough
19:45 GMT	O'Connor (yellow card) 58'; Morgan (yellow card) 64'; Garbett (yellow card) 72'	Report	Kemp (yellow card) 2'; Reid 21' (pen.); James-Wildin (yellow card) 56'; Freestone (yellow card) 72'	Stadium: Weston Homes Stadium; Attendance: 6,840; Referee: Edward Duckworth
Note: Fixture was originally scheduled for 11 October, but was postponed due to international call ups.

29 November 2025 18	Doncaster Rovers	2–1	Peterborough United	Doncaster
15:00 GMT	Gibson 7', 24'; Hanlan (yellow card) 32'; Clifton (yellow card) 33'; O'Riordan (yellow card) 65'; McGrath (yellow card) 69'; Maxwell (yellow card) 76'	Report	Kioso (yellow card) 34'; Leonard 50'; Woods (yellow card) 77'	Stadium: Eco-Power Stadium; Attendance: 9,654; Referee: Oliver Yates

9 December 2025 19	Reading	1–2	Peterborough United	Reading
20:00 GMT	Ehibhatiomhan (yellow card) 52' (goal) 60'	Report	Morgan 2' (yellow card) 58'; Woods (yellow card) 38'; Leonard 68'; Mills (yellow card) 73'	Stadium: Select Car Leasing Stadium; Attendance: 9,183; Referee: Craig Hicks

13 December 2025 20	Peterborough United	2–1	Northampton Town	Peterborough
15:00 GMT	Leonard 45+1' 48' (yellow card) 89'; Kioso (yellow card) 52'; Garbett (yellow card) 90+3'		Perkins (red card) 10'; Eaves 69'	Stadium: Weston Homes Stadium; Attendance: 9,260; Referee: John Busby

20 December 2025 21	Port Vale	0–1	Peterborough United	Burslem
15:00 GMT	Headley (yellow card) 36'; Heneghan (yellow card) 76'; Cole (yellow card) 87'		Morgan (yellow card) 45+4'; Leonard 83'	Stadium: Vale Park; Attendance: 7,533; Referee: Kirsty Dowle

26 December 2025 22	Peterborough United	1–0	Leyton Orient	Peterborough
15:00 GMT	Collins (yellow card) 22'; Kioso (yellow card) 36'; Frith 90+4'	Report	Mitchell (yellow card) 64'; Simpson (yellow card) 64'	Stadium: Weston Homes Stadium; Attendance: 9,882; Referee: Abigail Byrne

29 December 2025 23	Peterborough United	1–1	Reading	Peterborough
19:45 GMT	Collins (yellow card) 53'; Leonard (yellow card) 74'; Lindgren 78'		Doyle (yellow card) 17'; Kyerewaa 26'; Yiadom (yellow card) 72'	Stadium: Weston Homes Stadium; Attendance: 9,233; Referee: Alex Chilowicz

1 January 2026 24	Rotherham United	0–2	Peterborough United	Rotherham
15:00 GMT	Hugill (yellow card) 33'; Jules (yellow card) 55'; Yearwood (yellow card) 58'; McWilliams (yellow card) 72'		Johnston (yellow card) 45+1'; Rafferty 61' (o.g.); Khela 73'	Stadium: New York Stadium; Attendance: 8,429; Referee: Matt Corlett

4 January 2026 25	Lincoln City	5–2	Peterborough United	Lincoln
12:00 GMT	Hackett 33'; Draper 45'; Darikwa 45+2', 90+1'; Reach 57'; Towler (yellow card) 70'; Obikwu (yellow card) 87'	Report	Leonard 24', (yellow card) 83'; Collins (yellow card) 36'; Lisbie 56', (yellow card) 61'	Stadium: Sincil Bank; Attendance: 9,833; Referee: Charles Breakspear
Note: Fixture was originally scheduled for a 15:00 kick-off, but was rescheduled for live Sky Sports broadcasting.

10 January 2026 26	Peterborough United	3–1	Bolton Wanderers	Peterborough
15:00 GMT	Morgan 34'; Garbett 54'; Lisbie 66'; Kioso (yellow card) 81'; Hayes (yellow card) 90+7'	Report	Dalby 65'	Stadium: Weston Homes Stadium; Attendance: 7,838; Referee: Ollie Yates

17 January 2026 27	Peterborough United	0–1	Plymouth Argyle	Peterborough
15:00 GMT	O'Connor (yellow card) 4'; Lisbie (yellow card) 51'; Leonard (yellow card) 55'; Garbett (yellow card) 56'; Kioso (yellow card) 58' (yellow-red card) 89'; Collins (yellow card) 67'	Report	Boateng (yellow card) 6'; Pepple 23'; Tolaj (yellow card) 44'; Ross (yellow card) 90'; Mitchell (yellow card) 90+5'	Stadium: Weston Homes Stadium; Attendance: 8,684; Referee: Ben Atkinson

24 January 2026 28	Wycombe Wanderers	0–2	Peterborough United	High Wycombe
15:00 GMT			Lisbie 37'; Hayes 68'; Dornelly (yellow card) 85'	Stadium: Adams Park; Attendance: 7,166; Referee: Tom Reeves

27 January 2026 29	Stevenage	1–0	Peterborough United	Stevenage
19:45 GMT	Earley (yellow card) 41'; Phillips (yellow card) 57'; Sweeney 79'; Piergianni (yellow card) 86'	Report	Lisbie (yellow card) 39'	Stadium: Broadhall Way; Referee: Andrew Humphries

31 January 2026 30	Peterborough United	2–3	Huddersfield Town	Peterborough
15:00 GMT	Collins (yellow card) 20'; Nevett (yellow card) 25'; O'Brien-Brady (yellow card) 30'; Dornelly (yellow card) 57', (goal) 85'; Lees (yellow card) 59'; Lisbie 64'	Report	Sørensen 27'; Balker 47'; Ledson (yellow card) 49'; Charles (yellow card) 76'; Harness (yellow card) 79'; Humphreys 89'	Stadium: Weston Homes Stadium; Attendance: 9,251; Referee: Lee Swabey

7 February 2026 31	Peterborough United	6–1	Wigan Athletic	Peterborough
15:01 GMT	Lisbie 7' 9' (yellow card) 82' (goal) 90'; Morgan 41'; Leonard 68'; Aderoju 84'	Report	Taylor 27'; Wright (yellow card) 43'; Asamoah (yellow card) 82'	Stadium: Weston Homes Stadium; Attendance: 8,442; Referee: Stephen Parkinson

10 February 2026 16	Mansfield Town	1–2	Peterborough United	Mansfield
19:45 GMT	Russell (yellow card) 31'; Abbott (yellow card) 71' (goal) 84'		Morgan (yellow card) 51' (goal) 54'; Leonard 67'; Lisbie (yellow card) 90+5'	Stadium: Field Mill; Referee: Carl Brook
Note: Fixture was originally scheduled for 15 November, but was postponed due to international call-ups.

14 February 2026 32	Bradford City	2–0	Peterborough United	Bradford
15:00 GMT	Pointon 5'; Wright (yellow card) 16'; Tilt (yellow card) 31'; Jackson 50'; Power (yellow card) 66'	Report	Morgan (yellow card) 41'; Leonard (yellow card) 45+2'; Khela (yellow card) 60'	Stadium: Valley Parade; Attendance: 19,389; Referee: Sam Allison

17 February 2026 33	Barnsley	2–1	Peterborough United	Barnsley
19:45 GMT	Connell 34', (yellow card) 83'; Cleary 53'; Phillips (yellow card) 59'	Report	Lisbie 21'; Johnston (yellow card) 74'	Stadium: Oakwell; Attendance: 9,257; Referee: Zac Kennard-Kettle

21 February 2026 34	Peterborough United	3–3	Exeter City	Peterborough
15:00 GMT	Sykut 19'; Leonard 60', 79'	Report	Cox (yellow card) 6'; Sweeney (yellow card) 24'; Wareham 46', 52', 54', (yellow card) 65'; Aitchison (yellow card) 90+4'	Stadium: Weston Homes Stadium; Attendance: 7,341; Referee: Elliott Swallow

28 February 2026 35	Northampton Town	1–1	Peterborough United	Sixfields
12:30 GMT	Evans (yellow card) 41'; Eaves 44'	Report	Morgan 52', (yellow card) 64'; Frith (yellow card) 60'	Stadium: Sixfields Stadium; Attendance: 7,637 (1,524 Posh fans); Referee: David Rock
Note: Fixture was initially scheduled for a 15:00 kick-off, but was rescheduled for live Sky Sports broadcasting.

14 March 2026 37	Leyton Orient	2–1	Peterborough United	Leyton
15:00 GMT	Simpson 44'; Bakinson 81'; Happe (yellow card) 84'; Archibald (yellow card) 90+7'	Report	Frith (yellow card) 45+1'; Morgan 85'; Lisbie (yellow card) 90+9'	Stadium: Brisbane Road; Referee: Bobby Madley

17 March 2026 38	Peterborough United	5–0	Rotherham United	Peterborough
19:45 GMT	Lisbie 17'; Morgan 40'; Kamara 68' (pen.) 76' (pen.); Hayes (yellow card) 70'; Collins 81'		Baptiste (yellow card) 75'	Stadium: Weston Homes Stadium; Attendance: 6,112; Referee: Matthew Russell

21 March 2026 39	AFC Wimbledon	1–1	Peterborough United	Wimbledon
15:00 GMT	Hippolyte (yellow card) 30'; Johnson 43'; Maycock (yellow card) 50'	Report	Lisbie (yellow card) 66'; Morgan 67', (yellow card) 68'; Dornelly (yellow card) 90+4'	Stadium: Plough Lane; Attendance: 8,460; Referee: Scott Jackson

3 April 2026 41	Luton Town	2–1	Peterborough United	Luton
15:00 BST	Richards 20'; Keeley (yellow card) 33'; Clark 50'; Naismith (yellow card) 80'; Palmer (yellow card) 90+4'	Report	Leonard (penalty missed) 35'; Morgan 75'; Lisbie (yellow card) 80'; Kamara (yellow card) 90+3'	Stadium: Kenilworth Road; Attendance: 11,429; Referee: Isaac Searle

6 April 2026 42	Peterborough United	1–1	Cardiff City	Peterborough
15:00 BST	Leonard (yellow card) 45+5'; 49'; Lisbie (yellow card) 90+5'		Turnbull (yellow card) 42'; Robertson 48'; Kpakio (yellow card) 58'	Stadium: Weston Homes Stadium; Attendance: 9,370; Referee: Thomas Parsons

11 April 2026 43	Blackpool	3–1	Peterborough United	Blackpool
15:00 BST	Taylor 3', 82'; Bloxham 49'; Horsfall (red card) 83'; Walters (yellow card) 90+20'	Report	Khela 24'; Collins (yellow card) 86'; Hayes (yellow card) 90+21'	Stadium: Bloomfield Road; Attendance: 9,555; Referee: Charles Breakspear

16 April 2026 36	Peterborough United	1–3	Port Vale	Peterborough
19:45 BST	Dornelly 31'; Kamara (yellow card) 69'	Report	Croasdale 3'; Archer 16', 59'; Magloire (yellow card) 70'	Stadium: Weston Homes Stadium; Attendance: 6,533; Referee: Harry Wager
Note: Fixture was originally scheduled for 7 March, but was postponed due to Port Vale in FA Cup fifth round involvements.

19 April 2026 44	Peterborough United	1–1	Burton Albion	Peterborough
13:00 BST	Garbett (yellow card) 51'; Leonard 60'	Report	Chauke (yellow card) 14'; Webster 44'; Collins (yellow card) 90+8'	Stadium: Weston Homes Stadium; Attendance: 7,731; Referee: Richie Watkins
Note: Fixture was initially scheduled for 18 April, but was pushed back a day due to the Port Vale fixture being rearranged for the preceding Thursday.

25 April 2026 45	Stockport County	3–1	Peterborough United	Stockport
12:30 BST	Barry 28', 48', 64'; Bailey (yellow card) 53'; Edun (yellow card) 57'	Report	Leonard 13'; Mills (yellow card) 45+1'	Stadium: Edgeley Park; Attendance: 9,432; Referee: Jacob Miles
Note: Fixture was initially scheduled for a 15:00 kick-off, but was brought forward for live Sky Sports broadcasting.

28 April 2026 40	Peterborough United	0–0	Mansfield Town	Peterborough
19:45 BST		Report	McLaughlin (yellow card) 76'; Hewitt (yellow card) 90+1'	Stadium: Weston Homes Stadium; Attendance: 7,140; Referee: Lewis Sandoe
Note: Fixture was initially scheduled for 28 March, but was rearranged due to international call-ups.

2 May 2026 46	Peterborough United	1–3	Doncaster Rovers	Peterborough
15:00 BST	Mills (yellow card) 38'; Leonard 76'	Report	Sharp 54', 73', 79'; Grehan (yellow card) 68'; Lee (yellow card) 87'	Stadium: Weston Homes Stadium; Attendance: 10,192; Referee: Ed Duckworth

=== FA Cup ===
Peterborough were drawn at home against Cardiff City in the first round and to Barnsley in the second round.

Win Draw Loss Fixtures

1 November 2025 First round	Peterborough United	1–0	Cardiff City	Peterborough
15:00 GMT	Leonard 38'; Mills (yellow card) 79'; Khela (yellow card) 87'	Report		Stadium: Weston Homes Stadium; Attendance: 4,405; Referee: Sebastian Stockbridge

6 December 2025 Second round	Peterborough United	0–1	Barnsley	Peterborough
15:00 GMT	Garbett (yellow card) 63'; Okagbue (yellow card) 90+4'	Report	Jaló (yellow card) 25'; Phillips (yellow card) 27'; de Gevigney (yellow card) 48'; Kelly 73', (yellow card) 90+4'; Connell (yellow card) 90+2'	Stadium: London Road Stadium; Attendance: 4,157 (561 Barnsley fans); Referee: Alan Young

=== EFL Cup ===
Peterborough were drawn away to Accrington Stanley in the first round.

Win Draw Loss Fixtures

12 August 2025 First Round	Accrington Stanley	2–1	Peterborough United	Accrington
19:45 BST	Henderson 1' (yellow card) 36'; Pye (yellow card) 21'; Mooney 25'; Martin (yellow card) 31'; Brown (yellow card) 45+1'; Love (yellow card) 66'; Sass (yellow card) 90+2'		Lolos (yellow card) 45'; Lisbie (yellow card) 56'; Collins 80'	Stadium: Wham Stadium; Attendance: 847; Referee: Aaron Bannister

=== EFL Trophy ===
Peterborough were drawn against Crawley Town, Leyton Orient and Aston Villa U21 in the group stage. After finishing second in the group, Posh were drawn away to Swindon Town in the round of 32.

Pos	Div	Team	Pld	W	PW	PL	L	GF	GA	GD	Pts	Qualification
1	L1	Leyton Orient	3	3	0	0	0	6	2	+4	9	Advance to Round 2
2	L1	Peterborough United	3	2	0	0	1	7	6	+1	6	Advance to Round 2
3	L2	Crawley Town	3	1	0	0	2	6	6	0	3	
4	ACA	Aston Villa U21	3	0	0	0	3	4	9	−5	0	

Source: EFL

Win Draw Loss Fixtures

2 September 2025 South Group F	Peterborough United	1–3	Leyton Orient	Peterborough
19:00 BST	Dornelly (yellow card) 33'; Mills 45+2', (yellow card) 90'	Report	Abdulai (red card) 26'; Wellens 34'; Mitchell (yellow card) 55'; Moorhouse 57'; Craig 68'; Simpson (yellow card) 90+2'	Stadium: Weston Homes Stadium; Attendance: 2,458; Referee: Alex Chilowicz

30 September 2025 South Group F	Peterborough United	4–2	Aston Villa U21	Peterborough
19:00 BST	Mills (yellow card) 19'; Lisbie 52' 67' 74'; Morgan 72'; Johnston (yellow card) 87'		Borland (yellow card) 10'; Koné 41'; Lynskey 48'; Brannigan (yellow card) 90+5'	Stadium: Weston Homes Stadium; Attendance: 1,959; Referee: Alan Young

11 November 2025 South Group F	Crawley Town	1–2	Peterborough United	Crawley
19:45 GMT	Scott (yellow card) 73'; Bajrami 73'		Morgan 35'; Odoh (yellow card) 55'; O'Brien-Brady 90+4'	Stadium: Broadfield Stadium; Attendance: 924; Referee: Carl Brook

2 December 2025 Round of 32	Swindon Town	1–0	Peterborough United	Swindon
19:30 GMT	Munroe (yellow card) 63'; Clarke 88'	Report		Stadium: County Ground; Attendance: 2,135 (239 Posh fans); Referee: Dale Baines

== Statistics ==
=== Appearances and goals ===
Players with no appearances are not included on the list; italics indicate loaned in player

No.	Pos	Nat	Player	Total		League One		FA Cup		EFL Cup		EFL Trophy	
No.	Pos	Nat	Player	Apps	Goals	Apps	Goals	Apps	Goals	Apps	Goals	Apps	Goals
1	GK	(England) ENG	Alex Bass	43	0	40+0	0	2+0	0	0+0	0	1+0	0
2	DF	(Northern Ireland) NIR	Carl Johnston	30	0	22+4	0	0+0	0	0+0	0	4+0	0
4	MF	(England) ENG	Archie Collins	50	3	45+0	2	2+0	0	1+0	1	1+1	0
5	DF	(Sweden) SWE	Oscar Wallin	4	0	3+0	0	0+0	0	1+0	0	0+0	0
7	FW	(Greece) GRE	Klaidi Lolos	13	0	2+5	0	0+1	0	1+0	0	3+1	0
8	MF	(England) ENG	Brandon Khela	47	3	28+12	3	0+2	0	1+0	0	3+1	0
9	FW	(England) ENG	Bradley Ihionvien	5	1	4+1	1	0+0	0	0+0	0	0+0	0
10	FW	(England) ENG	Abraham Odoh	19	0	8+5	0	1+1	0	0+1	0	2+1	0
11	FW	(England) ENG	Declan Frith	30	1	8+20	1	1+0	0	0+0	0	1+0	0
12	DF	(England) ENG	Tom Lees	35	0	32+0	0	2+0	0	0+0	0	1+0	0
15	DF	(Wales) WAL	George Nevett	19	0	13+4	0	0+0	0	0+0	0	2+0	0
16	MF	(England) ENG	Ben Woods	25	1	14+6	1	2+0	0	0+0	0	2+1	0
17	FW	(England) ENG	Kyrell Lisbie	51	14	37+7	11	2+0	0	1+0	0	1+3	3
18	FW	(Republic of Ireland) IRL	Cian Hayes	35	3	11+22	3	0+0	0	0+1	0	0+1	0
22	MF	(England) ENG	Donay O'Brien-Brady	24	1	7+11	0	0+1	0	1+0	0	2+2	1
23	DF	(England) ENG	Harley Mills	30	1	19+5	0	2+0	0	1+0	0	3+0	1
24	FW	(England) ENG	Jimmy-Jay Morgan	39	14	32+2	12	1+1	0	0+0	0	1+2	2
26	DF	(Republic of Ireland) IRL	David Okagbue	34	0	25+5	0	1+0	0	1+0	0	2+0	0
27	FW	(England) ENG	Harry Leonard	42	17	35+2	16	1+1	1	0+0	0	2+1	0
28	MF	(New Zealand) NZL	Matthew Garbett	32	3	24+6	3	1+0	0	0+0	0	1+0	0
30	DF	(Democratic Republic of the Congo) COD	Peter Kioso	33	0	29+3	0	1+0	0	0+0	0	0+0	0
32	DF	(Brazil) BRA	Lucca Mendonca	8	0	2+2	0	0+0	0	0+1	0	0+3	0
33	DF	(England) ENG	James Dornelly	35	2	23+7	2	1+0	0	1+0	0	3+0	0
34	FW	(England) ENG	David Kamara	12	2	4+8	2	0+0	0	0+0	0	0+0	0
35	FW	(Wales) WAL	Joe Andrews	1	0	0+0	0	0+0	0	0+0	0	0+1	0
36	FW	(England) ENG	Boluwatife Shofowoke	9	0	6+2	0	0+0	0	0+1	0	0+0	0
38	DF	(England) ENG	Fabian Claxton	1	0	0+0	0	0+0	0	0+0	0	1+0	0
39	FW	(England) ENG	Pemi Aderoju	17	1	1+16	1	0+0	0	0+0	0	0+0	0
40	DF	(The Gambia) GAM	Jacob Mendy	12	0	7+5	0	0+0	0	0+0	0	0+0	0
42	MF	(Ukraine) UKR	Patryk Sykut	9	1	1+8	1	0+0	0	0+0	0	0+0	0
Players who featured but departed the club during the season:
13	GK	(England) ENG	Will Blackmore	1	0	0+0	0	0+0	0	0+0	0	1+0	0
14	MF	(England) ENG	Ryan de Havilland	2	0	0+1	0	0+0	0	0+0	0	1+0	0
19	FW	(Sweden) SWE	Gustav Lindgren	26	3	3+16	3	1+1	0	1+0	0	2+2	0
21	GK	(Chile) CHI	Vicente Reyes	7	0	4+0	0	0+0	0	1+0	0	2+0	0
29	DF	(Republic of Ireland) IRL	Thomas O'Connor	19	0	15+1	0	1+0	0	0+0	0	2+0	0
41	GK	(Australia) AUS	Nicholas Bilokapic	2	0	2+0	0	0+0	0	0+0	0	0+0	0
