= Jacob Mendy =

Gambian footballer (born 1996)

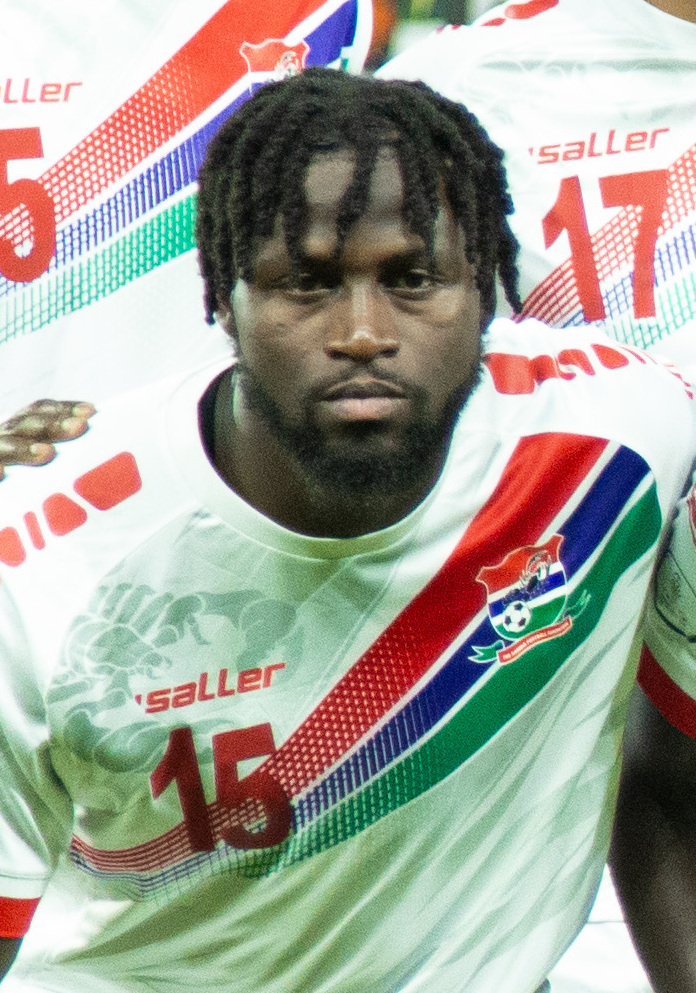
- Mendy playing for Gambia in an AFCON match

Personal information
- Full name: Jacob Mendy Mendy
- Date of birth: 27 December 1996 (age 29)
- Place of birth: Serrekunda, The Gambia
- Height: 5 ft 11 in (1.80 m)
- Positions: Left-back; left wing-back

Team information
- Current team: Bromley
- Number: 17

Youth career
- –2014: Parla
- 2014–2015: Atlético Casarrubuelos

Senior career*
Years	Team	Apps	(Gls)
2015	Atlético Madrid C	0	(0)
2015–2016	Puerta Bonita	1	(0)
2017–2018	Redhill	36	(11)
2018–2019	Carshalton Athletic	36	(5)
2019–2021	Wealdstone	69	(16)
2021–2022	Boreham Wood	44	(2)
2022–2026	Wrexham	65	(6)
2025–2026	→ Peterborough United (loan)	6	(0)
2026	Peterborough United	6	(0)
2026–	Bromley	3	(0)

International career^{‡}
2023–2024	Gambia	3	(0)
- * Club domestic league appearances and goals as of 15:31, 31 August 2026 (UTC) ‡ National team caps and goals as of 22:14, 23 January 2024 (UTC)

Jacob Mendy Mendy (born 27 December 1996) is a Gambian professional footballer who plays as a left-back or left wing-back for EFL League One club Bromley.

== Early life ==
Mendy was born in the Gambia before moving to Parla, near Madrid at the age of six. As a youth player, Mendy played for Parla and Atlético Casarrubuelos.

== Club career ==
He then briefly joined Atlético Madrid C before the team were disbanded in 2015. He then had a short spell with Puerta Bonita before moving to England. In 2017, he signed for English ninth tier side Redhill, scoring 13 goals in 40 games. In 2018, he signed for Carshalton Athletic in the English seventh tier, scoring eight goals in 46 games. In 2019, Mendy signed for English sixth tier club Wealdstone, helping them earn promotion to the English fifth tier. In 2021, he signed for Boreham Wood in the English fifth tier. In 2022, he signed for Welsh team Wrexham. On 1 September 2025, Mendy signed for EFL League One side Peterborough United on loan until the end of the season.

On 2 February 2026, Mendy joined Peterborough United on a permanent basis. Having been restricted to just six appearances since his permanent move due to injury, he departed the club upon the expiry of his contract at the end of the 2025–26 season.

On 11 July 2026, Mendy joined newly promoted League One club Bromley

== International career ==
On 6 June 2023, it was announced that Mendy had been named in The Gambia squad for their African Cup of Nations qualifier against South Sudan on 14 June 2023. He made his first international appearance against Ivory Coast in a World Cup qualifier on November 20.

== Personal life ==
Mendy speaks four languages - Spanish, English, Portuguese and Manjak - and is eligible to represent Gambia internationally, having been born there, as well as Guinea-Bissau, Senegal and Spain. His cousin Carlos Mendes Gomes is also a footballer.

When he first arrived in England, he worked as a construction worker, cleaner and waste collector.

== Career statistics ==
=== Club ===
As of end of 2025–26 season

Appearances and goals by club, season and competition
Club	Season	League			FA Cup		EFL Cup		Other		Total	
Club	Season	Division	Apps	Goals	Apps	Goals	Apps	Goals	Apps	Goals	Apps	Goals
Redhill	2017–18	Combined Counties Football League	36	11	—		—		—		36	11
Carshalton Athletic	2018–19	Isthmian League Premier	36	5	0	0	—		4 (Note: Appearance(s) in FA Trophy)	1	40	6
Wealdstone	2019–20	National League South	28	7	2	0	—		—		30	7
Wealdstone	2020–21	National League	41	9	1	0	—		—		42	9
Wealdstone	Total		69	16	3	0	—		—		72	16
Boreham Wood	2021–22	National League	44	2	6	0	—		3	0	53	2
Wrexham	2022–23	National League	30	4	1	0	—		1	0	32	4
Wrexham	2023–24	League Two	31	2	3	0	2	0	0	0	36	2
Wrexham	2024–25	League One	4	0	0	0	0	0	5 (Note: Appearance(s) in EFL Trophy)	0	9	0
Wrexham	2025–26	Championship	0	0	—		1	0	—		1	0
Wrexham	Total		65	6	4	0	3	0	6	0	78	6
Peterborough United (loan)	2025–26	League One	6	0	0	0	0	0	—		6	0
Peterborough United	2025–26	League One	6	0	0	0	0	0	—		6	0
Career total			262	40	13	0	3	0	13	1	291	41

=== International ===
As of match played 18 January 2024

Appearances and goals by national team and year
National team	Year	Apps	Goals
Gambia	2023	1	0
Gambia	2024	2	0
Total		3	0

== Honours ==
Wrexham

- National League: 2022–23
- EFL League Two runner-up: 2023–24
