= Gustav Lindgren =

Swedish footballer (born 2001)

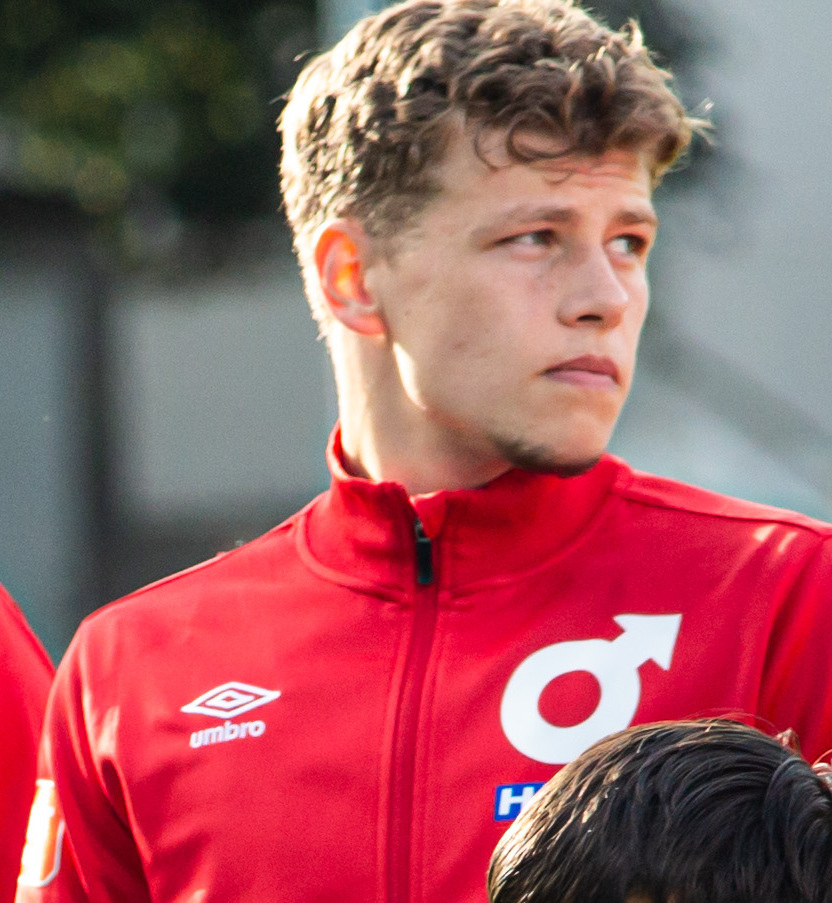
- Lindgren with Degerfors in 2023.

Personal information
- Full name: Gustav Willy Lindgren
- Date of birth: 16 August 2001 (age 25)
- Place of birth: Stockholm, Sweden
- Height: 1.85 m (6 ft 1 in)
- Position: Striker

Team information
- Current team: BK Häcken
- Number: 9

Youth career
- Sollentuna
- 2018–2020: FC Djursholm

Senior career*
Years	Team	Apps	(Gls)
2021	Karlberg		
2022	Sollentuna	19	(10)
2023–2024	Degerfors	44	(16)
2025–2026	Peterborough United	32	(4)
2026–	BK Häcken	22	(12)
- * Club domestic league appearances and goals as of 20 September 2026

Gustav Willy Lindgren (born 16 August 2001) is a Swedish professional footballer who plays as a striker for BK Häcken.

== Career ==
Born in Stockholm, Lindgren spent his early career with Sollentuna and FC Djursholm; after playing for Karlberg in 2021, he returned to Sollentuna in 2022. At the end of that season it was announced that he would sign for Degerfors. He scored 3 goals for the club in the 2023 Allsvenskan, before scoring more goals in the 2024 Superettan, leading to speculation that he would sign for AIK.

In September 2024 Lindgren signed for English club Peterborough United, effective from 1 January 2025.

On 14 January 2026, Lindgren signed for Allsvenskan side BK Häcken for an undisclosed fee.

== Career statistics ==
As of match played 8 July 2026

Appearances and goals by club, season and competition
Club	Season	League			National Cup (Note: Includes Svenska Cupen, FA Cup)		League Cup (Note: Includes EFL Cup)		Other		Total	
Club	Season	Division	Apps	Goals	Apps	Goals	Apps	Goals	Apps	Goals	Apps	Goals
Sollentuna	2022	Ettan	19	10	1	0	–		0	0	20	10
Degerfors	2023	Allsvenskan	16	3	2	0	–		0	0	18	3
Degerfors	2024	Superettan	28	13	5	5	–		0	0	33	18
Degerfors	2025	Allsvenskan	0	0	1	1	–		0	0	1	1
Degerfors	Total		44	16	8	6	0	0	0	0	52	22
Peterborough United	2024–25	League One	13	1	1	0	0	0	3 (Note: Appearances in EFL Trophy)	2	17	3
Peterborough United	2025–26	League One	19	3	2	0	1	0	4	0	26	3
Peterborough United	Total		32	4	3	0	1	0	7	2	43	6
BK Häcken	2026 Allsvenskan	Allsvenskan	11	5	3	0	–		0	0	14	5
Career total			106	35	15	6	1	0	7	2	129	43

== Honours ==
Peterborough United

- EFL Trophy: 2024–25
