= Winkler (novel) =

2006 novel by Giles Coren

Winkler is a 2006 novel by English food critic Giles Coren. It is a 'comic account of one man's search for meaning, identity, and a suitable response to the burden of history'.

== My Failed Novel ==
Winkler was the subject of a Sky Arts documentary entitled My Failed Novel which featured Jeffrey Archer, Hanif Kureishi and various other authors. The documentary was a broader meditation on the subject of failure but focused on the novel itself, which garnered a £30,000 advance yet only sold 771 copies in hardback and 1400 in paperback.

In the documentary, the genesis of the novel was considered by a range of people. A contemporary critic of the book, Stephen Bayley, said the novel had a certain 'lavatorial awfulness' and 'an overwhelming obsession with bums.'

== Reception ==
The Spectator wrote, 'there is an infectious glee with which Coren pillories politically correct nostra and the scabrous humour and farce make him a worthy heir of Tom Sharpe'.

A review by The Independent's Michael Bywater was written with the byline, 'Bright Spark dowsed in a swamp of disgust.' Bywater describes the protagonist of Winkler as 'too morally exhausted to attempt the construction of meaning for those around him. Winkler's default interaction is contempt or abuse, his disgust with the physical world – flopping flesh, sad food, corridor smells – boundless.' He added, 'wrapped inside Winkler's nihilism is a serious mediation on deeper matters: identity, wandering, return, and two questions which still cast the longest of shadows. What of the Holocaust, and what does it mean to be a Jew?'

The book was considered in a chapter of Ruth Gilbert's textbook Writing Jewish: Contemporary British-Jewish Literature.

=== Bad Sex in Fiction Award ===
The book won a 2005 Bad Sex in Fiction Award from the Literary Review. In the words of The Guardian, "Coren beat off heavyweight competition for the prize with an unpunctuated 138-word description of coitus, followed by the two-word sentence, 'like Zorro'."

ShortList magazine named it 'one of the absolute worst 'Bad Sex Awards' entries ever.'
