= Matthew Garbett =

Footballer (born 2002)

Personal information
- Full name: Matthew Jimmy David Garbett
- Date of birth: 13 April 2002 (age 24)
- Place of birth: London, England
- Height: 1.88 m (6 ft 2 in)
- Position: Midfielder

Team information
- Current team: Peterborough United
- Number: 28

Youth career
- 2015–2017: Western Suburbs

Senior career*
Years	Team	Apps	(Gls)
2017–2019	Western Suburbs	30	(15)
2018–2019	→ Eastern Suburbs (loan)	1	(0)
2019	→ Team Wellington (loan)	1	(0)
2020–2021	Falkenbergs FF	17	(0)
2021–2023	Torino	0	(0)
2023	→ NAC Breda (loan)	14	(1)
2023–2025	NAC Breda	36	(5)
2025–	Peterborough United	32	(4)

International career^{‡}
2018–2019	New Zealand U17	10	(4)
2021–	New Zealand U23	3	(1)
2021–	New Zealand	30	(5)
- * Club domestic league appearances and goals as of 17 October 2026 ‡ National team caps and goals as of 27 March 2025

Matthew Jimmy David Garbett (born 13 April 2002) is a professional footballer who plays as a midfielder for EFL League One side Peterborough United. Born in England, he plays for the New Zealand national team.

== Club career ==
=== Western Suburbs ===
Born in London, England, Garbett moved to New Zealand at a young age. Aged 12, Garbett moved from his hometown of Paraparaumu to Porirua to attend the Olé Football Academy. During this time, Garbett played for Olé-affiliated club Western Suburbs in the Central Premier League, making his debut in 2017 and reaching the final of the 2018 Chatham Cup.

=== Team Wellington ===
As part of the Olé Football Academy's affiliation with ISPS Handa Premiership club Eastern Suburbs, Garbett linked up with the side to participate in the 2018 National Youth League. He made one appearance for the senior team, coming on as a substitute in a 5–0 win over Hawke's Bay United on 20 October 2018. The following season, Olé formed a new affiliation with Team Wellington; Garbett followed suit, signing for them in 2019. He made his only appearance for the club in a 2–1 win over Canterbury United on 1 December 2019.

=== Falkenbergs FF ===
Following his standout performances for New Zealand in the 2019 FIFA U-17 World Cup, Garbett signed for Allsvenskan side Falkenbergs FF on 24 January 2020. Garbett made his professional debut for the club in a 1–0 Svenska Cupen victory against Halmstads BK.

=== Torino ===
After participating at the Summer Olympics with the OlyWhites, Garbett signed a three-year deal with Torino, initially joining the Primavera team.

Garbett was called up to the senior team for the first time on 10 April 2022, remaining on the bench for a Serie A clash against AC Milan. After ten straight appearances on the bench to begin the 2022–23 Serie A season, Garbett finally made his professional debut for Torino in a Coppa Italia clash against Cittadella on 18 October 2022, coming on as a substitute for Nikola Vlašić in a 4–0 win.

==== Loan to NAC Breda ====
On 31 January 2023, Garbett joined NAC Breda in the Netherlands on loan with an option to buy. On 11 May this option was triggered, with Garbett signing a two-year deal.

=== Peterborough United ===
On 14 August 2025, Garbett signed for EFL League One side Peterborough United on a two-year deal with an option for a third.

== International career ==
=== U-17 ===
Garbett was part of the New Zealand team that won the 2018 OFC U-16 Championship, making his debut in a 5–0 loss against the Solomon Islands on 12 September 2018. New Zealand won the tournament, qualifying for the 2019 FIFA U-17 World Cup held in Brazil. Garbett played all three games in the group stage, scoring against Angola and Canada as New Zealand finished third in their group.

=== U-23 ===
Originally named as a travelling reserve for the OlyWhites to play at the 2020 Summer Olympics, Garbett ended up starting in the final two games – first in a 0–0 draw in the final pool game against Romania, followed by a loss to Japan in the quarter-finals.

=== Senior national team ===
Garbett made his international debut with the senior New Zealand national team in a 2–1 friendly win over Curaçao on 9 October 2021.

Garbett was called up to the 26-man New Zealand squad to play in the 2026 FIFA World Cup on 14 May 2026. He started in New Zealand's 0–1 friendly loss to England, but would later pick up an injury during training, ruling him out of the tournament. He was replaced by Logan Rogerson.

== Personal life ==
Matthew's brother Norman plays for League of Ireland First Division side Dundalk and played in the 2023 FIFA U-20 World Cup for New Zealand.

== Career statistics ==
=== Club ===
As of match played 13 December 2025

Appearances and goals by club, season and competition
Club	Season	League			Cup (Note: Includes Chatham Cup, Svenska Cupen, Coppa Italia, KNVB Beker, FA Cup)		League Cup (Note: Includes EFL Cup)		Other		Total	
Club	Season	Division	Apps	Goals	Apps	Goals	Apps	Goals	Apps	Goals	Apps	Goals
Eastern Suburbs	2018–19	NZ Premiership	1	0	—		—		0	0	1	0
Team Wellington	2019–20	NZ Premiership	1	0	—		—		—		1	0
Falkenbergs	2020	Allsvenskan	13	0	3	0	—		—		16	0
Falkenbergs	2021	Superettan	7	0	3	0	—		—		10	0
Falkenbergs	Total		20	0	6	0	0	0	0	0	26	0
Torino	2021–22	Serie A	0	0	0	0	—		—		0	0
Torino	2022–23	Serie A	0	0	1	0	—		—		1	0
Torino	Total		0	0	1	0	0	0	0	0	1	0
NAC Breda (loan)	2022–23	Eerste Divisie	14	1	—		—		4 (Note: Appearances in Eerste Divisie play-offs)	0	18	1
NAC Breda	2023–24	Eerste Divisie	24	4	1	0	—		6	0	31	4
NAC Breda	2024–25	Eredivisie	12	1	0	0	—		—		12	1
NAC Breda	2025–26	Eredivisie	0	0	0	0	—		—		0	0
NAC Breda	Total		36	5	1	0	0	0	6	0	43	5
Peterborough United	2025–26	League One	14	2	1	0	0	0	1 (Note: Appearance(s) in EFL Trophy)	0	16	2
Peterborough United	2026–27	League One	0	0	0	0	0	0	0	0	0	0
Peterborough United	Total		14	2	1	0	0	0	1	0	16	2
Career total			86	8	9	0	0	0	11	0	106	8

=== International ===
Scores and results list New Zealand's goal tally first, score column indicates score after each Garbett goal.

List of international goals scored by Matthew Garbett
No.	Date	Venue	Opponent	Score	Result	Competition
1	30 March 2022	Grand Hamad Stadium, Doha, Qatar	Solomon Islands	5–0	5–0	2022 FIFA World Cup qualification
2	26 March 2023	Sky Stadium, Wellington, New Zealand	China	2–0	2–1	Friendly
3	21 November 2023	Aviva Stadium, Dublin, Republic of Ireland	Republic of Ireland	1–1	1–1	Friendly
4	14 October 2024	North Harbour Stadium, Auckland, New Zealand	Malaysia	2–0	4–0	Friendly
5	15 November 2024	Waikato Stadium, Hamilton, New Zealand	Vanuatu	1–0	8–1	2026 FIFA World Cup qualification

== Honours ==
Western Suburbs

- Central League: 2017, 2019
- Chatham Cup runner-up: 2018

Eastern Suburbs

- New Zealand Football Championship: 2018–19

New Zealand U17

- OFC U-17 Championship: 2018
