= George Nevett =

Welsh footballer

Personal information
- Full name: George Patrick Nevett
- Date of birth: 14 February 2006 (age 20)
- Place of birth: Wrexham, Wales
- Position: Defender

Team information
- Current team: Tranmere Rovers (on loan from) Peterborough United
- Number: 30

Youth career
- –2023: Rochdale

Senior career*
Years	Team	Apps	(Gls)
2023–2024	Rochdale	35	(0)
2024–	Peterborough United	35	(0)
2026–	→ Tranmere Rovers (loan)	0	(0)

International career^{‡}
2023–2024	Wales U19	3	(0)
2025–	Wales U21	4	(0)
- * Club domestic league appearances and goals as of 17:47, 1 September 2026 (UTC) ‡ National team caps and goals as of 14:57, 29 September 2026 (UTC)

George Patrick Nevett (born 14 February 2006) is a Welsh professional footballer who plays for EFL League Two club Tranmere Rovers on loan from EFL League One club Peterborough United, as a defender. He is a Wales under-21 international.

== Club career ==
=== Rochdale ===
Having joined the Rochdale academy, Nevett made his senior debut on 29 April 2023 as a late substitute in a 4–1 victory over Sutton United.

=== Peterborough United ===
On 19 June 2024, Nevett signed for League One club Peterborough United for an undisclosed fee on a four-year deal. He made his debut, coming on as a substitute, against Wrexham in August.

Following the conclusion of the 2025–26 season, the club announced that Nevett had been listed available for transfer.

On 1 September 2026, Nevett joined EFL League Two club Tranmere Rovers on loan for the remainder of the 2026-27 season.

== International career ==
Nevett is a Wales under-21 international.

== Career statistics ==
As of end of 2025–26 season

Appearances and goals by club, season and competition
Club	Season	League			FA Cup		EFL Cup		Other		Total	
Club	Season	Division	Apps	Goals	Apps	Goals	Apps	Goals	Apps	Goals	Apps	Goals
Rochdale	2022–23	EFL League Two	1	0	0	0	0	0	0	0	1	0
Rochdale	2023–24	National League	34	0	0	0	0	0	0	0	34	0
Rochdale	Total		35	0	0	0	0	0	0	0	35	0
Peterborough United	2024–25	EFL League One	16	0	3	0	0	0	5 (Note: Appearance(s) in EFL Trophy)	0	24	0
Peterborough United	2025–26	League One	17	0	0	0	0	0	2	0	19	0
Peterborough United	Total		33	0	3	0	0	0	7	0	43	0
Career total			68	0	3	0	0	0	7	0	78	0
