= Arden Academy =

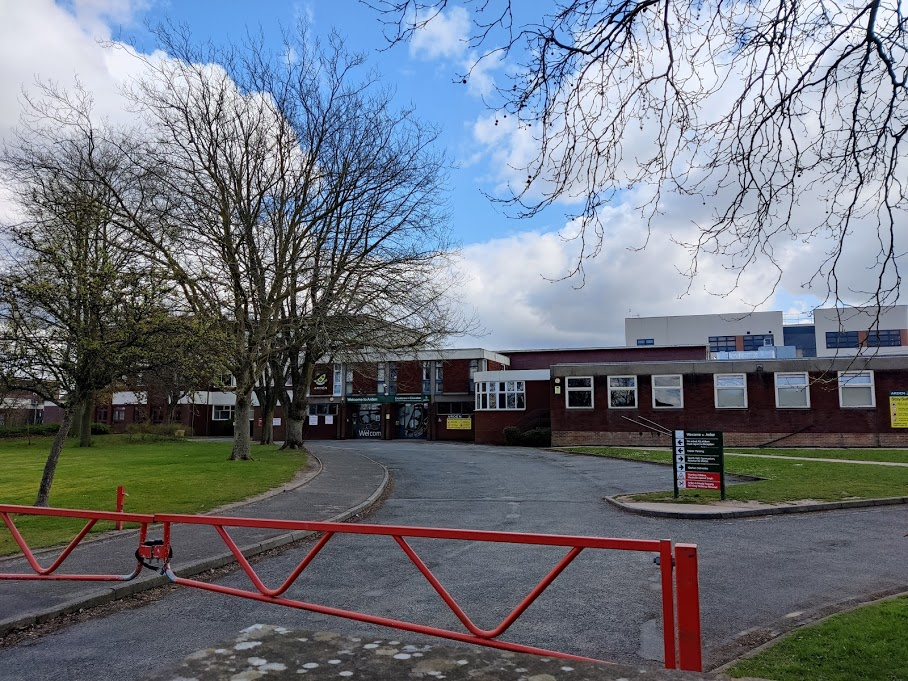

Location
- Station Road; Solihull, West Midlands, B93 0PT; United Kingdom; 52°23′07″N 1°44′18″W

Information
- Type: Academy
- Motto: Ad Altiora ("To the Higher")
- Local authority: Solihull
- Department for Education URN: 136333 Tables
- Ofsted: Reports
- Headteacher: Mr David Warwood
- Gender: Coeducational
- Age: 11 to 18
- Enrolment: 1774
- Houses: Curie, Parks, Attenborough, Darwin and Nightingale
- Colour: Green/gold
- Website: https://www.arden.solihull.sch.uk/

Arden Academy (formerly Arden School) is a ten form entry (from 2015) mixed comprehensive secondary school with academy status It was re-designated as an 11-18 school in September 2008. Arden is situated in the village of Knowle, three miles from Solihull town centre in the West Midlands, United Kingdom.

== History ==
Arden started its life in the 1950s as a two form entry 11-15 Warwickshire School. Since then the school has expanded considerably and developed accommodation, particularly specialist areas. Within the teaching blocks there are a number of classrooms containing suites of computers, there is a wireless network across the academy and in some subject areas like science and history, there are banks of Chromebooks.

In the last fifteen years specialist teaching spaces have been constructed for many areas:

- Music and Drama with two drama studios, a dance studio, two specialist classrooms for music as well as practice rooms that students can use during break, lunch and lessons.
- Science – where there are nine specialist labs as well as support facilities.
- A purpose built gymnasium together with changing facilities, an all-weather astroturf pitch, and a multi-use games area (MUGA).
- A purpose built post-16 Sixth Form.
- A design technology building including a hair salon, wood working stations and food technology rooms.
- A new teaching block was officially opened in October 2015 with more classrooms as well as additional science labs.

In 2006 there was a 'Post 16 Centre' installed, with the first trial year group finishing in Summer 2008. The pilot sixth-form was successful, and gave Arden School its official 11-18 status the following year. The sixth-form admits approximately 120 students each year.

As of October 2010, Arden School became an academy under government plans and was renamed 'Arden' or 'Arden Academy'. Due to its academical status it became independent from the local council.

In September 2020 Arden was forced to close for two weeks due to a failure to contain and isolate COVID-19 cases on site.

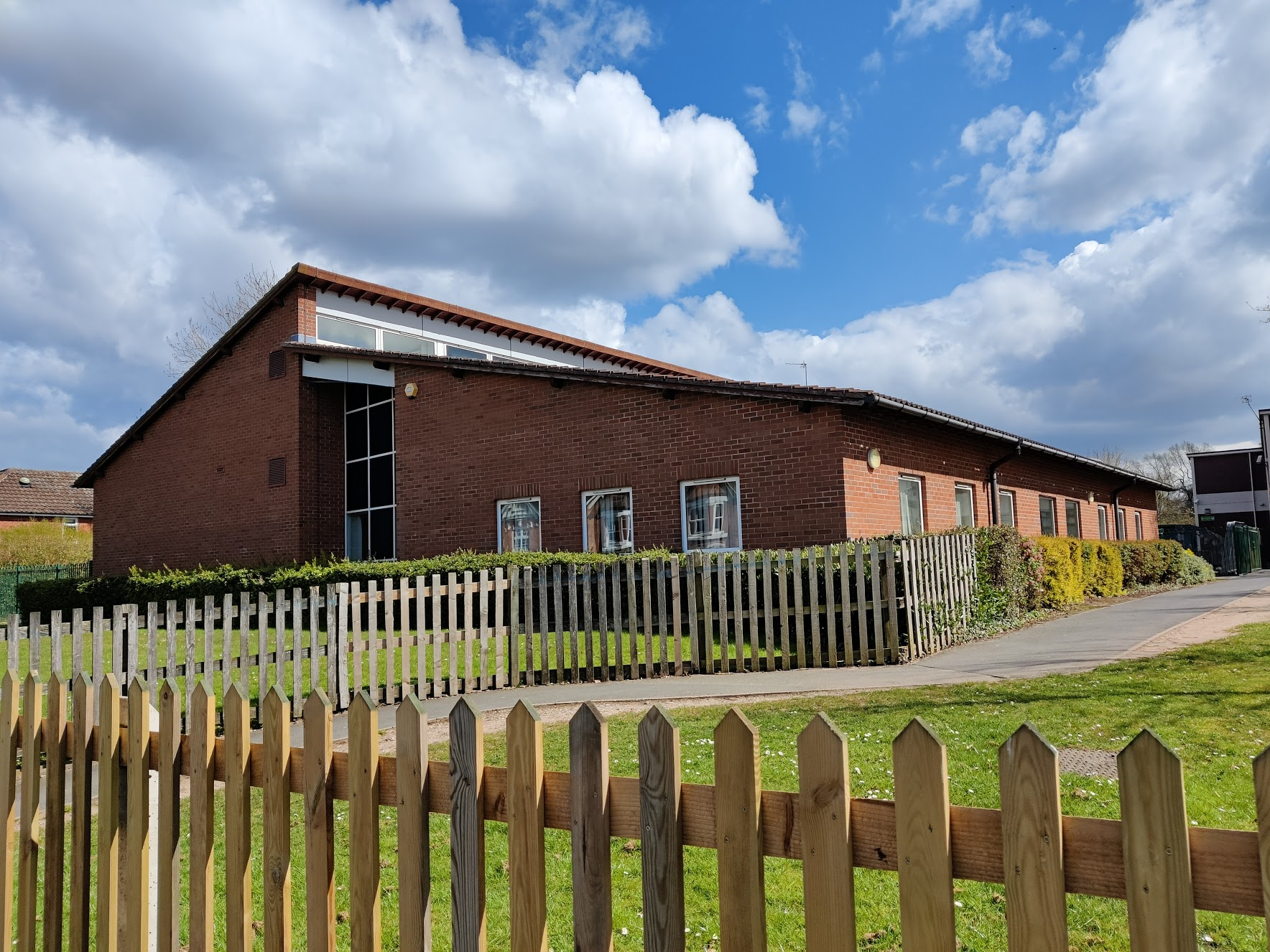
The music block at Arden Academy in Knowle, West Midlands

== Forms and Houses ==
There are ten forms in each year, each given a letter taken from the school's name: ARDEN SCHOL

Arden operates a house system with five houses:

House	Named after	Colour
Darwin	Charles Darwin	Blue
Curie	Marie Curie	Yellow
Parks	Rosa Parks	Red
Nightingale	Florence Nightingale	Purple
Attenborough	David Attenborough	Green

Prior to the expansion to five houses, Arden had four houses with two forms per year assigned to each house:

House	Named after	Colour
Aylward	Gladys Aylward	Blue
Baird	John Logie Baird	Yellow
Eliot	George Eliot	Purple
Fleming	Alexander Fleming	Red

== Awards ==
In 2013, Arden won the 'Class of the Year' award from 'The School Awards', run by The Birmingham Mail in association with the Pallasades. This was for work on anti-bullying policies, in particular an Anti-Homophobia campaign. Teacher Mr Warwood attended the ceremony held at the Birmingham Think Tank with students Gerard Groves, James Gavigan, and Katie Kraddock who had been heavily involved in the campaigns.

In 2019 Arden library was shortlisted for The Bookseller's 'Library of the Year'

== New Arden Academy ==
Beginning in 2015, Arden began planning to demolish the current site to make way for 1000 additional houses with an entirely new site to be built on a plot of land not far from the original. The proposed new site would include a Swimming pool, Performing arts theatre, Day Nursery, and Youth Centre. The reasons cited for the development of a new site include drainage problems, lack of previously mentioned facilities, and poor disabled access.

== Alumni ==
- Russell Leetch, bassist in Editors
- Cian Harries, footballer
- Callum O'Hare, footballer
- Caleb Taylor, footballer
- Brandon Khela, footballer
