= Polly Russell =

English historian

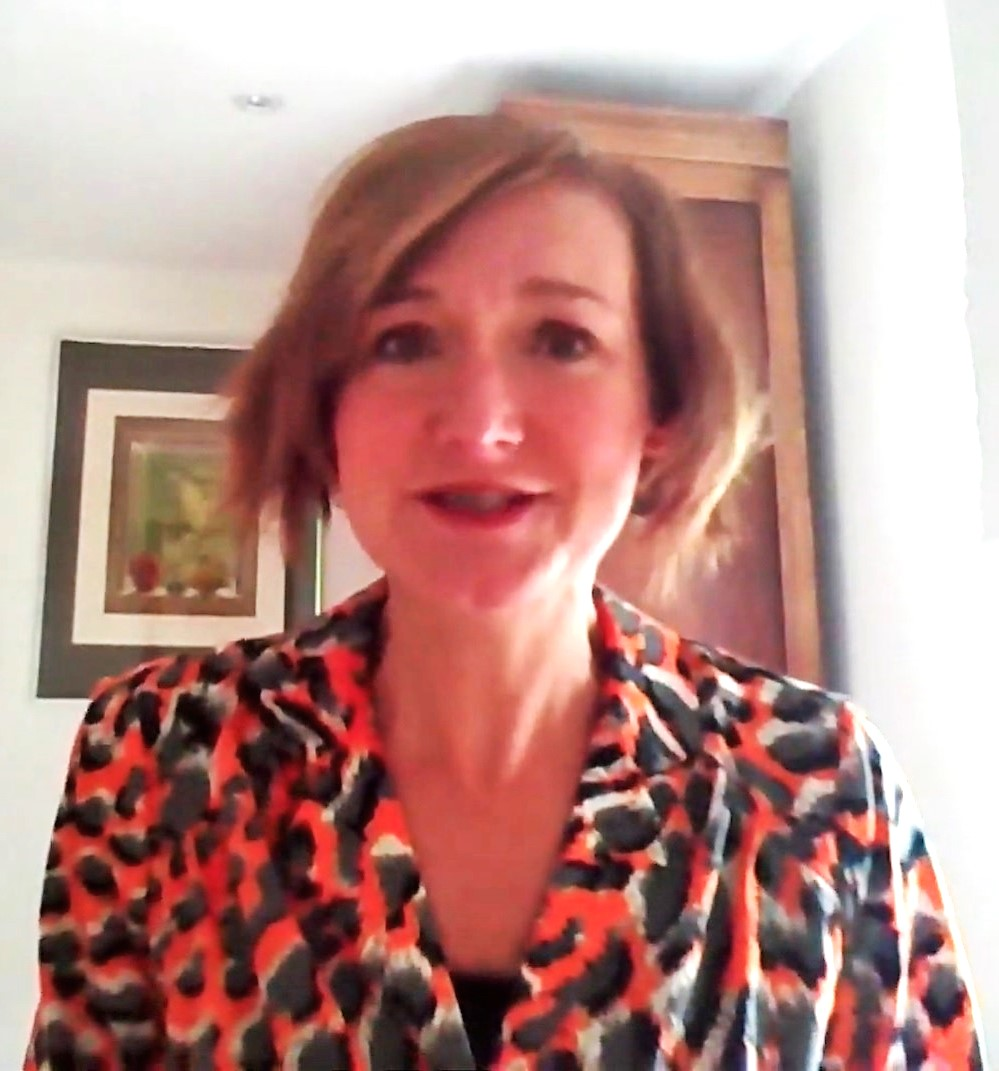
- Russell speaks to the British Library in 2021
- Born: Polly Elisabeth Russell; Surrey, England
- Education: University of Exeter
- Occupations: Food historian, curator

Polly Elisabeth Russell is a food historian and curator at the British Library with responsibility for research on social science and food. She writes a food history column for the weekend magazine of the Financial Times and from 2015 has been the co-presenter of the BBC television series Back in Time for....

== Early life ==
Polly Russell was educated at the University of Exeter, from where she earned a first-class bachelor's degree in American and Commonwealth Arts (1990–1994). She earned a master's degree in journalism from Louisiana State University (1995–1996).

== Career ==
Russell received a stipend to spend a year researching food in Louisiana, after which she returned to the U.K., where she worked as a kitchen junior at The Carved Angel and Moro Restaurant. In July 1997, she joined Marks & Spencer, where she worked in product development, and then completed her PhD at the University of Sheffield in 2003.

Russell was a research fellow at the University of Sheffield from 2003 to 2007, and from 2003 has been a freelance food writer and researcher. She joined the British Library in 2007 as Lead Curator for Human Geography and Anthropology. Since 2008, she has been curator in Social Sciences. At the British Library, Russell has worked on Sisterhood & After, an oral history of the Women's Liberation Movement, and on the digitisation of Spare Rib magazine.

She has written "The History Cook" column in the FT Weekend magazine since 2012, and in 2015 she presented the television series Back in Time for... with Sara Cox on BBC television. She is also the curator of the British Library's annual Food Season, which she founded in 2018.

== Selected publications ==
- The Kitchen Revolution: A year of time-and-money-saving recipes. Ebury Press, 2008. (With Rosie Sykes and Zoe Heron) ISBN 978-0091913731
- Welcome to London: A world of eating. Herb Lester Associates, 2015 (map). (With Jenny Linford & Mikey Burton) ISBN 978-1910023389
