= Patryk Sykut =

Ukrainian footballer (born 2008)

Personal information
- Full name: Patryk Oleksandr Sykut
- Date of birth: 15 July 2008 (age 18)
- Place of birth: Camden, England
- Position: Midfielder

Team information
- Current team: Peterborough United
- Number: 21

Senior career*
Years	Team	Apps	(Gls)
2026–	Peterborough United	9	(1)

International career^{‡}
2026–	Ukraine U19	4	(0)
- * Club domestic league appearances and goals as of 16:33, 30 May 2026 (UTC) ‡ National team caps and goals as of 00:10, 11 July 2026 (UTC)

Patryk Oleksandr Sykut (Ukrainian: Патрік Олександр Сикут, romanized: Patrik Oleksandr Sykut; born 15 July 2008) is a professional footballer who plays as a midfielder for EFL League One club Peterborough United.

== Career ==
On 12 January 2026, Sykut signed a first professional contract with Peterborough United having impressed with the club's under-21s and under-18s teams. Two weeks later, he made his professional debut as a second-half substitute in a 2–0 victory away to Wycombe Wanderers. On 21 February 2026, he opened the scoring in a 3–3 draw with Exeter City on his first start, becoming the club's fourth youngest Football League goalscorer.

== International career ==
In May 2026, Sykut was named in the Poland U18 squad.

On 16 June 2026, Sykut was named in the Ukraine U19 squad for the 2026 UEFA European Under-19 Championship.

== Personal life ==
Sykut was born in the London Borough of Camden and is of Ukrainian and Polish descent.

== Career statistics ==
As of end of 2025–26 season

Appearances and goals by club, season and competition
Club	Season	League			FA Cup		League Cup		Other		Total	
Club	Season	Division	Apps	Goals	Apps	Goals	Apps	Goals	Apps	Goals	Apps	Goals
Peterborough United	2025–26	League One	9	1	0	0	0	0	0	0	9	1
Career total			9	1	0	0	0	0	0	0	9	1
