= 2025–26 Rotherham United F.C. season =

101st season in existence of Rotherham United FC

Rotherham United
2025–26 season
- Chairman: Tony Stewart
- Manager: Matt Hamshaw (until 18 March); Lee Clark (from 18 March)
- Stadium: New York Stadium
- League One: 22nd (relegated)
- FA Cup: First round
- EFL Cup: Second round
- EFL Trophy: Round of 16
- Top goalscorer: League: Sam Nombe (11); All: Sam Nombe (12)
- Highest home attendance: 10,049 vs Doncaster Rovers (21 February 2026, League One)
- Lowest home attendance: 1,373 vs Oldham Athletic (7 October 2025, EFL Trophy)
- Average home league attendance: 8,591
- Biggest win: 2–7 vs Salford City (A) (2 December 2025, EFL Trophy)
- Biggest defeat: 5–0 vs Peterborough United (A) (17 March 2026, League One)
Home colours	Away colours	Third colours

The 2025–26 season was the 101st season in the history of Rotherham United Football Club and their second consecutive season in League One. In addition to the domestic league, the club also participated in the FA Cup, the EFL Cup, and the EFL Trophy.

== Managerial changes ==
On 18 March 2026, the club parted company with manager Matt Hamshaw after just under a year in charge and a 30.2% win rate. He was replaced by Lee Clark on a deal until the end of the season.

== Transfers and contracts ==
=== In ===
Date	Pos.	Player	From	Fee	Ref.
1 July 2025 (Note: The transfer was announced on 24 June, and would become official on July 1 once his contract at West Brom had expired)	GK	(England) Ted Cann	(England) West Bromwich Albion	Free	
1 July 2025 (Note: The transfer was announced on 11 June, and would become official on July 1 once his contract at Barrow had expired)	CM	(England) Kian Spence	(England) Barrow	Free	
15 July 2025	CB	(Scotland) Lenny Agbaire	(Scotland) Celtic	Undisclosed	
19 July 2025	CM	(England) Dru Yearwood	(United States) Nashville	Free	
21 July 2025	CM	(England) Josh Benson	(England) Barnsley	Free	
22 July 2025	RB	(Democratic Republic of the Congo) Marvin Kaleta	(England) Wolverhampton Wanderers	Undisclosed	
25 July 2025	RB	(Netherlands) Denzel Hall	(Netherlands) Heerenveen	Undisclosed	
30 July 2025	LB	(Curaçao) Ar'jany Martha	(Belgium) Beerschot	Undisclosed	
23 January 2026	CB	(Republic of Ireland) Emmanuel Adegboyega	(England) Norwich City	Undisclosed	
2 February 2026	CDM	(Jamaica) Brandon Cover	(England) Leicester City	Undisclosed	
2 February 2026	RW	(England) Duncan Watmore	(England) Millwall	Free	

=== Out ===
Date	Pos.	Player	To	Fee	Ref.

=== Loaned in ===
Date	Pos.	Player	From	Date until	Ref.
17 July 2025	CM	(England) Dan Gore	(England) Manchester United	31 May 2026	
1 August 2025	CF	(England) Kion Etete	(Wales) Cardiff City	15 January 2026 (Note: On 15 January, Etete's initial season-long loan from Cardiff City was terminated)	
18 August 2025	CF	(Netherlands) Martin Sherif	(England) Everton	31 December 2025 (Note: On 31 December, Sherif was recalled to Everton)	
29 August 2025	CB	(England) Jamal Baptiste	(England) Sheffield United	31 May 2026	
1 September 2025	CB	(England) Tom Holmes	(England) Luton Town	12 January 2026 (Note: On 12 January, Holmes' initial season-long loan from Luton Town was terminated)	
14 January 2026	CF	(England) Harry Gray	(England) Leeds United	31 May 2026	
2 February 2026	CF	(Wales) Gabriele Biancheri	(England) Manchester United	31 May 2026	
2 February 2026	LB	(England) Lino Sousa	(England) Aston Villa	31 May 2026	

=== Loaned out ===
Date	Pos.	Player	To	Date until	Ref.
20 August 2025	CF	(England) Josh Ayres	(England) Cleethorpes Town	17 September 2025	
3 September 2025	CM	(England) Kane Richardson	(England) Brighouse Town	1 November 2025 (Note: On 16 October, Richardson's loan at Brighouse was extended until the start of November)	
5 September 2025	CAM	(England) James Clarke	(England) Brighouse Town	4 October 2025	
30 September 2025	CF	(England) Josh Ayres	(England) Gainsborough Trinity	28 October 2025	
4 October 2025	CF	(Northern Ireland) Ciaran McGuckin	(England) Eastleigh	1 November 2025	
31 December 2025	CF	(England) Reece Wilson	(England) Brighouse Town	5 March 2026 (Note: On 5 February, Wilson's loan at Brighouse Town was extended by a month)	
22 January 2026	CF	(England) Josh Ayres	(England) Alfreton Town	18 March 2026 (Note: On 18 March, Ayres was recalled from his half-season loan at Alfreton Town)	
2 February 2026	CB	(England) Sean Raggett	(England) Cambridge United	31 May 2026	
7 February 2026	CAM	(England) Ben Hatton	(England) North Ferriby	30 April 2026 (Note: On 12 March, Hatton's loan at North Ferriby was extended until the end of the regular Northern Premier League season)	
3 March 2026	LM	(England) Kane Richardson	(England) Brighouse Town	31 May 2026 (Note: On 31 March, Richardson's loan at Brighouse Town was extended until the end of the season)	

=== Released / Out of Contract ===
Date	Pos.	Player	Subsequent club	Join date	Ref.
30 June 2025	CB	(England) Cameron Humphreys	(England) Port Vale	1 July 2025	
30 June 2025	GK	(England) Dillon Phillips	(England) Hull City	1 July 2025	
30 June 2025	LW	(England) Andre Green	(Greece) Panserraikos	8 July 2025	
30 June 2025	DM	(England) Hakeem Odoffin	(England) Luton Town	10 July 2025	
30 June 2025	CB	(England) Jake Hull	(England) Scarborough Athletic	28 July 2026	
30 June 2025	RM	(Scotland) Alex MacDonald	Retired		
4 July 2025	CF	(Jamaica) Jonson Clarke-Harris	(Turkey) Pendikspor	9 July 2025	

=== New Contract ===
Date	Pos.	Player	Contract until	Ref.
6 June 2025	CB	(England) Hamish Douglas	30 June 2027 (Note: Option for an extra year)	
9 June 2025	CF	(England) Josh Ayres	30 June 2026	
9 June 2025	CM	(England) Ben Hatton	30 June 2026	
28 June 2025	CF	(Northern Ireland) Ciaran McGuckin	30 June 2026	
29 June 2025	CF	(Republic of Ireland) Joshua Kayode	30 June 2026	

== Pre-season and friendlies ==
On 5 June, Rotherham United announced their first pre-season fixture, against Accrington Stanley. A day later, a second friendly was confirmed against Harrogate Town. A third fixture was shortly added after, with the traditional meeting with Parkgate to begin the preparations for the new season. A home fixture was then confirmed against Sheffield United. On 12 June, a warm-weather training camp in Portugal was announced along with a friendly versus Bromley.

Win Draw Loss Fixtures

4 July 2025 Friendly	Parkgate	0–3	Rotherham United	Parkgate
18:45 BST		Report	Trialist 6'; Powell 30', 31'	Stadium: Roundwood Sports Complex; Referee: Waqar Ahmad

11 July 2025 Friendly	Bromley	1–2	Rotherham United	Albufeira, Portugal
11:00 WEST	Cheek 42'	Report	Hugill 15'; Trialist 45+1'	Stadium: Estadio Da Nora

15 July 2025 Friendly	Harrogate Town	0–3	Rotherham United	Harrogate
19:00 BST		Report	Hugill 46', 65', 73'	Stadium: Wetherby Road

19 July 2025 Friendly	Rotherham United	0–5	Sheffield United	Rotherham
15:00 BST		Report	Oné 15'; Campbell 49'; Brooks 64'; Cannon 72'; O'Hare 85'	Stadium: New York Stadium; Attendance: 6,009 (3,259 away); Referee: James Bell

26 July 2025 Friendly	Accrington Stanley	4–1	Rotherham United	Accrington
15:00 BST	Rawson 11'; Whalley 20'; Martin 25'; Coyle 55'	Report	Nombe 60'	Stadium: Crown Ground

== Competitions ==
=== League One ===
==== League table ====
Pos	Team	Pld	W	D	L	GF	GA	GD	Pts	Promotion, qualification or relegation
20	Leyton Orient	46	14	10	22	59	71	−12	52	
21	Exeter City (R)	46	12	13	21	52	61	−9	49	Relegation to EFL League Two
22	Port Vale (R)	46	10	12	24	36	61	−25	42	Relegation to EFL League Two
23	Rotherham United (R)	46	10	11	25	41	71	−30	41	Relegation to EFL League Two
24	Northampton Town (R)	46	9	8	29	39	74	−35	35	Relegation to EFL League Two

Source: EFL Official Website
Rules for classification: 1) Points; 2) Goal difference; 3) Number of goals scored; 4) Head-to-head results; 5) Wins; 6) Away goals; 7) Penalty points (sec 9.5); 8) 12-point sending off offences
(R) Relegated

==== Results summary ====
Overall								Home						Away					
Pld	W	D	L	GF	GA	GD	Pts	W	D	L	GF	GA	GD	W	D	L	GF	GA	GD
46	10	11	25	41	71	−30	41	6	9	8	24	32	−8	4	2	17	17	39	−22

Last updated: complete.
Source: Soccerway

==== Results by round ====
Round	1	2	3	5	6	7	8	9	10	11	12	13	14	4^{1}	15	16	17	18	19	20	21	22	23	24	27	28	29	30	31	33	34	26^{3}	35	25^{1}	36	37	38	39	41	42	43	32^{4}	44	40^{5}	45	46
Ground	H	A	A	H	A	H	A	H	A	H	A	H	A	H	H	A	A	H	H	A	H	A	A	H	A	H	H	A	H	A	H	A	H	H	A	H	A	A	H	A	H	A	A	H	H	A
Result	W	L	L	D	L	W	L	L	L	D	W	W	W	D	W	D	D	D	L	L	L	L	L	L	L	D	W	W	L	L	L	L	W	D	L	D	L	L	D	L	L	L	W	L	D	L
Position	9	15	18	17	19	12	18	21	21	22	22	16	15	12	12	11	12	13	15	15	18	21	22	22	23	23	23	20	23	23	23	23	23	22	22	22	22	22	22	22	22	22	22	22	22	23
Points	3	3	3	4	4	7	7	7	7	8	11	14	17	18	21	22	23	24	24	24	24	24	24	24	24	25	28	31	31	31	31	31	34	35	35	36	36	36	37	37	37	37	40	40	41	41

Source: EFL
A = Away; H = Home; W = Win; D = Draw; L = Loss; P = Postponed
Notes:
- ^{1} Matchday 4 (vs. Burton Albion) was postponed due to Burton's EFL Cup first round tie being rescheduled.
- ^{2} Matchday 25 (vs. Mansfield Town) was postponed due to a frozen pitch.
- ^{3} Matchday 26 (vs. Bradford City) was postponed due to a frozen pitch.
- ^{4} Matchday 32 (vs. Wigan Athletic) was postponed due opposition's FA Cup involvements.
- ^{5} Matchday 40 (vs. Luton Town) was postponed due to international call-ups.

==== Matches ====
On 26 June, the League One fixtures were released.

Win Draw Loss Fixtures

2 August 2025 1	Rotherham United	2–1	Port Vale	Rotherham
15:00 BST	Nombe 13', 29'; Jules (yellow card) 39' (yellow-red card) 77'; Gore (yellow card) 53'	Report	Byers (yellow card) 24'; Headley (red card) 32'; Hall 60'	Stadium: New York Stadium; Attendance: 9,883 (2,052 away); Referee: Jacob Miles

9 August 2025 2	Stevenage	1–0	Rotherham United	Stevenage
15:00 BST	Kemp (yellow card) 8'; Reid 40'; Goode (yellow card) 68'; Phillips (yellow card) 87'	Report	Rafferty (yellow card) 35'; Raggett (yellow card) 48'	Stadium: Broadhall Way; Attendance: 3,470; Referee: James Durkin

16 August 2025 3	Cardiff City	3–0	Rotherham United	Leckwith
15:00 BST	Mafico (yellow card) 32'; Salech 43'; Bagan (yellow card) 51'; Ashford 55'; Colwill 60'	Report	Martha (yellow card) 20'; Agbaire (yellow card) 38'; Raggett (yellow card) 68'	Stadium: Cardiff City Stadium; Attendance: 17,555; Referee: Thomas Parsons

23 August 2025 5	Rotherham United	2–2	Wigan Athletic	Rotherham
12:30 BST	Kelly (yellow card) 29'; McWilliams 60'; Sherif 80'	Report	Raggett 42' (o.g.); Francois (yellow card) 55'; Wright (yellow card) 66'; Mullin 88'; Costelloe (yellow card) 90+5'	Stadium: New York Stadium; Attendance: 8,200 (981 away); Referee: Oliver Langford
Note: Fixture was originally scheduled for a 15:00 kick-off, but was moved live Sky Sports broadcasting.

30 August 2025 6	Doncaster Rovers	1–0	Rotherham United	Doncaster
12:30 BST	Bailey 26'; Broadbent (yellow card) 73'; Ajayi (yellow card) 85'; Senior (yellow card) 87'	Report	Etete (yellow card) 12'	Stadium: Eco-Power Stadium; Attendance: 11,457; Referee: Elliot Bell
Note: Fixture was originally scheduled for a 15:00 kick-off, but was moved live Sky Sports broadcasting.

6 September 2025 7	Rotherham United	1–0	Exeter City	Rotherham
15:00 BST	Hall 39'; Baptiste (yellow card) 90+3'			Stadium: New York Stadium; Attendance: 7,699; Referee: Martin Woods

13 September 2025 8	AFC Wimbledon	2–1	Rotherham United	Wimbledon
15:00 BST	Johnson (yellow card) 33'; Reeves 50'; Stevens 67' (pen.); Harbottle (yellow card) 79'	Report	Jules (yellow card) 2'; Spence (yellow card) 7'; Hugill 38', (yellow card) 66'	Stadium: Plough Lane; Attendance: 8,058; Referee: Lee Swabey

20 September 2025 9	Rotherham United	0–1	Stockport County	Rotherham
15:00 BST	Jules (yellow card) 12'; Hugill (yellow card) 13'; Kelly (yellow card) 88'	Report	O'Keeffe (yellow card) 23'; Wootton (yellow card) 53', (goal) 60'	Stadium: New York Stadium; Attendance: 8,784 (1,547 away); Referee: David Rock

27 September 2025 10	Mansfield Town	2–1	Rotherham United	Mansfield
15:00 BST	Roberts (yellow card) 32', (goal) 62'; Moriah-Welsh (yellow card) 35'; McLaughlin (yellow card) 45+4'; Dwyer 90'	Report	Hugill 7' (pen.); Hall (yellow card) 20'; Agbaire (yellow card) 38'; Gore (yellow card) 45+3'; James (yellow card) 88'	Stadium: Field Mill; Attendance: 8,201 (922 Rotherham fans); Referee: Simon Mather

2 October 2025 11	Rotherham United	2–2	Bradford City	Rotherham
20:00 BST	Hall 20', (yellow card) 54'; Powell (yellow card) 36'; Baptiste (yellow card) 39'; Sherif 50'; Dawson (yellow card) 70'	Report	Swan (yellow card) 39'; Pointon (yellow card) 53'; Sarcevic 56'; McIntyre (yellow card) 58'; Leigh (yellow card) 64'; Pattison 81'	Stadium: New York Stadium; Attendance: 9,546; Referee: Oliver Yates
Note: Fixture was originally scheduled for 4 October, but was rescheduled for live Sky Sports broadcasting.

11 October 2025 12	Northampton Town	1–2	Rotherham United	Northampton
14:00 BST	Hoskins 26' (pen.), (yellow card) 58'; McCarthy (yellow card) 38'; Wheatley (yellow card) 86'	Report	Baptiste (yellow card) 35'; Jules (yellow card) 45+3'; Rafferty 71'; Benson 87'	Stadium: Sixfields Stadium; Attendance: 6,548; Referee: Paul Tierney
Note: Fixture was initially scheduled for a 15:00 kick-off, but was moved to avoid a clash with a Northampton Saints fixture in the same area.

18 October 2025 13	Rotherham United	1–0	Leyton Orient	Rotherham
15:00 BST	Hugill (yellow card) 21'; Spence (yellow card) 29'; Gore (yellow card) 45+4'; Nombe 56'	Report	Clare (yellow card) 21'; El Mizouni (yellow card) 27'; Happe (yellow card) 90+5'	Stadium: New York Stadium; Attendance: 8,057 (539 away); Referee: Scott Oldham

25 October 2025 14	Barnsley	0–1	Rotherham United	Barnsley
15:00 BST	Roberts (yellow card) 14'; Shepherd (yellow card) 45+2'; Kelly (yellow card) 55'; Connell (yellow card) 63'	Report	Spence 64'	Stadium: Oakwell; Attendance: 12,468 (1,982 away); Referee: Benjamin Speedie

4 November 2025 4	Rotherham United	2–2	Burton Albion	Rotherham
19:45 GMT	Sibbick 69' (o.g.); Douglas 90+4'	Report	Lofthouse 51', (yellow card) 69'; Shade 63', (yellow card) 76'; Collins (yellow card) 84'	Stadium: New York Stadium; Attendance: 7,228 (229 away); Referee: Ross Joyce
Note: Fixture was originally scheduled for 19 August, but was postponed due to Burton's EFL Cup first round tie being rescheduled.

8 November 2025 15	Rotherham United	3–0	Lincoln City	Rotherham
15:00 GMT	James 10'; Martha 31'; Nombe (yellow card) 50'; Hall 59'	Report	Draper (yellow card) 61'	Stadium: New York Stadium; Attendance: 8,912 (1,534 away); Referee: Alex Chilowicz

15 November 2025 16	Luton Town	0–0	Rotherham United	Luton
15:00 GMT	Andersen (yellow card) 33'	Report	Douglas (yellow card) 83'	Stadium: Kenilworth Road; Attendance: 11,091 (711 away); Referee: Craig Hicks

22 November 2025 17	Reading	1–1	Rotherham United	Reading
15:00 GMT	Ritchie (yellow card) 33'; Savage 78'; Yiadom (yellow card) 90+3'	Report	Benson 20', (yellow card) 24'; Yearwood (yellow card) 58'; Douglas (yellow card) 88'	Stadium: Madejski Stadium; Attendance: 15,279 (407 away); Referee: Alan Young

29 November 2025 18	Rotherham United	1–1	Wycombe Wanderers	Rotherham
15:00 GMT	Gore (yellow card) 39'; Spence (yellow card) 66', (goal) 70'; James (yellow card) 81'	Report	Taylor (yellow card) 12'; Mullins 14'; Grimmer (yellow card) 39'	Stadium: New York Stadium; Attendance: 8,360 (334 away); Referee: Seb Stockbridge

10 December 2025 19	Rotherham United	0–3	Blackpool	Rotherham
19:45 GMT	Spence (yellow card) 45'	Report	Imray 2'; Bloxham 18'; Brown (yellow card) 20'; Peacock-Farrell (yellow card) 61'; Horsfall (yellow card) 62'; Fletcher 85'	Stadium: New York Stadium; Attendance: 7,367 (277 away); Referee: Neil Hair
Note: Fixture was initially scheduled for 9 December, but was rescheduled due to Blackpool's FA Cup involvements on the preceding Sunday.

13 December 2025 20	Plymouth Argyle	1–0	Rotherham United	Plymouth
15:00 GMT	Ralls 42', (yellow card) 65'; Pleguezuelo (yellow card) 55'; Edwards (yellow card) 66'	Report	Spence (yellow card) 18'; Gore (yellow card) 74'	Stadium: Home Park; Attendance: 14,318 (335 away); Referee: David Rock

20 December 2025 21	Rotherham United	1–3	Huddersfield Town	Rotherham
15:00 GMT	Gore (yellow card) 4'; Dawson (yellow card) 90+4'; Nombe 90+5'	Report	Gooch 26', (yellow card) 70'; Radulović 30'; Castledine 44'	Stadium: New York Stadium; Attendance: 9,514 (1,866 away); Referee: Matthew Russell

26 December 2025 22	Bolton Wanderers	2–1	Rotherham United	Horwich
15:00 GMT	Sheehan 45+1', 90+3'; Conway (yellow card) 69'	Report	Martha (yellow card) 63'; Baptiste (yellow card) 85'; Nombe 90' (pen.)	Stadium: Toughsheet Community Stadium; Attendance: 23,416 (1,071 away); Referee: Elliot Bell

29 December 2025 23	Blackpool	4–0	Rotherham United	Blackpool
19:45 GMT	Bowler 11'; Imray 19'; Husband (yellow card) 55'; Fletcher 62'; Bloxham 90+3'	Report	Martha (yellow card) 27'; Etete (yellow card) 29'; Baptiste (red card) 58'	Stadium: Bloomfield Road; Attendance: 9,632; Referee: Ollie Yates

1 January 2026 24	Rotherham United	0–2	Peterborough United	Rotherham
15:00 GMT	Hugill (yellow card) 33'; Jules (yellow card) 55'; Yearwood (yellow card) 58'; McWilliams (yellow card) 72'; Ayres (yellow card) 90+4'	Report	Johnston (yellow card) 45+1'; Rafferty 61' (o.g.); Khela 73'	Stadium: New York Stadium; Attendance: 8,429 (1,007 away); Referee: Matthew Corlett

17 January 2026 27	Stockport County	3–2	Rotherham United	Edgeley
15:00 GMT	Raggett 13' (o.g.); Edun (yellow card) 24'; Stokes (yellow card) 53'; Dawson 56' (o.g.); Norwood (yellow card) 71'; Andrésson 76'	Report	Olowu 42' (o.g.); Rafferty (yellow card) 55'; Nombe 60'; Spence (yellow card) 89'	Stadium: Edgeley Park; Attendance: 9,141 (634 away); Referee: Edward Duckworth

24 January 2026 28	Rotherham United	1–1	AFC Wimbledon	Rotherham
15:00 GMT	James (yellow card) 22'; Jules 50'; Gray (yellow card) 60'	Report	Johnson (yellow card) 39'; Bauer (yellow card) 48'; Browne 82'	Stadium: New York Stadium; Attendance: 7,787 (464 away); Referee: Richard Eley

27 January 2026 29	Rotherham United	2–1	Northampton Town	Rotherham
19:45 GMT	Nombe (yellow card) 28'; Gray (yellow card) 46', (goal) 58'; Adegboyega 84'; Rafferty (yellow card) 90+2'	Report	Eaves 26'	Stadium: New York Stadium; Attendance: 7,228 (293 away); Referee: Alan Young

31 January 2026 30	Exeter City	0–4	Rotherham United	Exeter
15:00 GMT	Brierley (yellow card) 24'; Magennis (yellow card) 83'; Niskanen (yellow card) 86'	Report	Baptiste 28'; Rafferty 71'; Gray 72'; McWilliams 75'; Martha (yellow card) 90+7'	Stadium: St James Park; Attendance: 7,171; Referee: Paul Howard

7 February 2026 31	Rotherham United	0–3	Cardiff City	Rotherham
15:00 GMT	Martha (yellow card) 72'; Nombe (yellow card) 79'; Baptiste (yellow card) 90+3'	Report	Tanner (yellow card) 11'; Wintle (red card) 21'; Fish (yellow card) 41'; Kellyman 43'; Willock 58'; Turnbull (yellow card) 86'; Davies 90+5'	Stadium: New York Stadium; Attendance: 8,786 (1,395 away); Referee: Seb Stockbride

17 February 2026 33	Burton Albion	1–0	Rotherham United	Burton upon Trent
19:45 GMT	Shade 23'; Vancooten (yellow card) 54'	Report	Yearwood (yellow card) 36'; Jules (yellow card) 45+1'	Stadium: Pirelli Stadium; Attendance: 3,405 (796 away); Referee: Abigail Byrne

21 February 2026 34	Rotherham United	1–2	Doncaster Rovers	Rotherham
12:30 GMT	Nombe 3' (pen.); McWilliams (yellow card) 10'; Spence (yellow card) 45'; Gray (yellow card) 90+6'	Report	McGrath (yellow card) 1'; Bynre (yellow card) 17'; Hanlan 56'; Molyneux 68'; Sterry (yellow card) 73'	Stadium: New York Stadium; Attendance: 10,049 (2,270 away); Referee: Simon Mather

24 February 2026 26	Bradford City	1–0	Rotherham United	Bradford
19:45 GMT	Pennington 11'; Wright (yellow card) 84'	Report	Adegboyega (yellow card) 84'	Stadium: Valley Parade; Attendance: 18,187; Referee: Martin Woods
Note: Fixture was originally scheduled for 10 January, but it was postponed due to a frozen pitch.

28 February 2026 35	Rotherham United	1–0	Plymouth Argyle	Rotherham
15:00 GMT	Rafferty 7', (yellow card) 77'; Baptiste (yellow card) 15'; Benson (yellow card) 29'; Martha (yellow card) 32'; Gore (yellow card) 75'	Report	Harding (yellow card) 28'; Pleguezuelo (yellow card) 42'; Edwards (yellow card) 81'; Sorinola (yellow card) 81'; MacKenzie (yellow card) 87'	Stadium: New York Stadium; Attendance: 8,502 (1,139 away); Referee: Zac Kennard-Kettle

3 March 2026 25	Rotherham United	0–0	Mansfield Town	Rotherham
19:45 GMT	Gray (yellow card) 46'; Jules (yellow card) 75'	Report	Hewitt (yellow card) 58'	Stadium: New York Stadium; Attendance: 9,243 (2,162 away); Referee: Scott Oldham
Note: Fixture was postponed due to a frozen pitch.

7 March 2026 36	Huddersfield Town	1–0	Rotherham United	Huddersfield
12:30 GMT	Agbaire 76' (o.g.)	Report	Rafferty (yellow card) 65'	Stadium: Kirklees Stadium; Attendance: 16,592; Referee: Martin Coy
Note: Fixture was originally scheduled for a 15:00 kick-off, but was brought forward for Sky Sports broadcasting.

14 March 2026 37	Rotherham United	2–2	Bolton Wanderers	Rotherham
12:30 GMT	Rafferty (yellow card) 38'; Nombe 39', 42'; Cover (yellow card) 48'; Cann (yellow card) 57'	Report	Erhahon (yellow card) 13'; Forino 51'; Dalby 83'	Stadium: New York Stadium; Attendance: 9,348 (2,067 away); Referee: James Oldham
Note: Fixture was originally scheduled for a 15:00 kick-off, but was brought forward for Sky Sports broadcasting.

17 March 2026 38	Peterborough United	5–0	Rotherham United	Peterborough
19:45 GMT	Lisbie 17'; Morgan 40'; Kamara 68' (pen.), 76' (pen.); Hayes (yellow card) 70'; Collins 81'	Report	Baptiste (yellow card) 75'	Stadium: London Road Stadium; Attendance: 6,112; Referee: Matthew Russell

21 March 2026 39	Lincoln City	3–0	Rotherham United	Lincoln
15:00 GMT	Cann 18' (o.g.); House 34'; Hackett 45'	Report	Jules (yellow card) 90+3'	Stadium: Sincil Bank; Attendance: 10,071 (943 away); Referee: Craig Hicks

3 April 2026 41	Rotherham United	0–0	Stevenage	Rotherham
15:00 BST	Gore (yellow card) 51' (yellow-red card) 88'; James (yellow card) 62'	Report	Phillips (yellow card) 13'; Freestone (yellow card) 45+3'; Goode (yellow card) 90+1'; White (yellow card) 90+4'	Stadium: New York Stadium; Attendance: 7,920; Referee: Carl Brook

7 April 2026 42	Port Vale	1–0	Rotherham United	Burslem
19:45 BST	Croasdale 6', (yellow card) 57'	Report		Stadium: Vale Park; Attendance: 4,523; Referee: Ross Joyce
Note: Fixture was initially scheduled for 6 April, but was rearranged due to Port Vale in FA Cup quarter-final involvements.

11 April 2026 43	Rotherham United	1–3	Barnsley	Rotherham
15:00 BST	Nombe 90+5' (pen.)	Report	O'Keeffe (yellow card) 20'; Phillips 37'; Yoganathan (yellow card) 50'; Bradshaw 64', 74'; de Gevigney (yellow card) 88'; O'Connell (yellow card) 90+4'	Stadium: New York Stadium; Attendance: 9,575; Referee: Lee Swabey

14 April 2026 32	Wigan Athletic	3–0	Rotherham United	Wigan
19:45 BST	Kerr 15'; Taylor 52'; Wright 63'; Murray (yellow card) 64'; Aimson (yellow card) 88'	Report	Baptiste (yellow card) 41'; Cover (yellow card) 72'	Stadium: Brick Community Stadium; Attendance: 7,989; Referee: Ben Speedie
Note: Fixture was initially scheduled for 14 February, but was rearranged due to Wigan's ongoing involvement in the FA Cup.

18 April 2026 44	Leyton Orient	0–2	Rotherham United	Leyton
15:00 BST	Morris (yellow card) 85'		Gray 24'; Lee (yellow card) 38'; Rafferty (yellow card) 68'; Nombe 73'; Martha (yellow card) 78'	Stadium: Brisbane Road; Attendance: 7,816; Referee: James Bell

21 April 2026 40	Rotherham United	0–2	Luton Town	Rotherham
19:45 BST	Clarke (yellow card) 43'	Report	Palmer 8', 44'; Odoffin (yellow card) 88'; Keeley (yellow card) 90+1'	Stadium: New York Stadium; Attendance: 7,497 (650 away); Referee: Sam Mulhall
Note: Fixture was initially scheduled for 28 March, but was rearranged due to international call-ups in the Luton squad.

25 April 2026 45	Rotherham United	1–1	Reading	Rotherham
15:00 BST	Adegboyega (yellow card) 14'; Hall (yellow card) 15'; Nombe 25'; Baptiste (yellow card) 90'	Report	Kyerewaa 47'; Lane (yellow card) 80'; Roberts (yellow card) 87'	Stadium: New York Stadium; Attendance: 8,029 (883 away); Referee: John Brooks

2 May 2026 46	Wycombe Wanderers	3–2	Rotherham United	High Wycombe
15:00 BST	Allen 11'; Fink 25'; Henderson (yellow card) 45+9'; Olabiyi 90+1'	Report	Yearwood (yellow card) 1'; Holmes 17', 22'; Gray (yellow card) 76'	Stadium: Adams Park; Attendance: 5,568 (364 away); Referee: Harrison Blair

=== FA Cup ===
Rotherham were drawn at home to Swindon Town in the first round.

Win Draw Loss Fixtures

1 November 2025 First round	Rotherham United	1–2 (a.e.t.)	Swindon Town	Rotherham
15:00 GMT	Nombe 5'; Gore (yellow card) 87'; Hugill (yellow card) 120'	Report	Palmer 72'; Drinan (yellow card) 86', (red card) 90+7'; Oldaker (yellow card) 90+6', (goal) 116'; Bodin (yellow card) 114'	Stadium: New York Stadium; Attendance: 3,351 (864 away); Referee: Martin Woods

=== EFL Cup ===
Rotherham were drawn away to Salford City in the first round and to Barnsley in the second round.

Win Draw Loss Fixtures

12 August 2025 First round	Salford City	0–0 (2–3 p)	Rotherham United	Kersal
19:45 BST	Cesay (yellow card) 83'; Woodburn (yellow card) 90+5'	Report	Yearwood (yellow card) 37'	Stadium: Moor Lane; Attendance: 1,409 (453 away); Referee: Edward Duckworth
	Penalties
	Edwards (penalty missed); Garbutt (penalty scored); Woodburn (penalty scored); Grant (penalty missed); N'Mai (penalty missed)		(penalty scored) Powell; (penalty scored) Holmes; (penalty missed) Gore; (penalty scored) Hall

26 August 2025 Second round	Barnsley	2–1	Rotherham United	Barnsley
19:45 BST	Bland (yellow card) 58'; Russell 59'; Phillips 68', (yellow card) 78'	Report	Martha 19', (yellow card) 44'; Dawson (yellow card) 69'	Stadium: Oakwell; Attendance: 5,803 (871 away); Referee: Matthew Corlett

=== EFL Trophy ===
Rotherham were drawn against Bolton Wanderers, Oldham Athletic and Manchester City U21 in the group stage. After finishing second in the group stage, they were then drawn away to Salford City in the round of 32. and to Huddersfield Town in the round of 16.

Pos	Div	Team	Pld	W	PW	PL	L	GF	GA	GD	Pts	Qualification
1	L1	Bolton Wanderers	3	3	0	0	0	10	2	+8	9	Advance to Round 2
2	L1	Rotherham United	3	2	0	0	1	7	5	+2	6	Advance to Round 2
3	ACA	Manchester City U21	3	1	0	0	2	7	8	−1	3	
4	L2	Oldham Athletic	3	0	0	0	3	5	14	−9	0	

Source: EFL

Win Draw Loss Fixtures

2 September 2025 North Group E	Bolton Wanderers	1–0	Rotherham United	Horwich
19:00 BST	Gale 37' (red card) 45+2'; Taylor (yellow card) 86'	Report	Kaleta (yellow card) 52'; Jules (yellow card) 90+3'	Stadium: Toughsheet Community Stadium; Attendance: 2,063; Referee: Andrew Humphries

7 October 2025 North Group E	Rotherham United	3–2	Oldham Athletic	Rotherham
19:00 BST	Spence 52'; McWilliams (yellow card) 77'; Leake 87' (o.g.); James 90+1'; Hugill (yellow card) 90+2'	Report	Hannant 1', (yellow card) 61'; Ogle 36'	Stadium: New York Stadium; Attendance: 1,310 (145 away); Referee: Aaron Bannister

28 October 2025 North Group E	Rotherham United	4–2	Manchester City U21	Rotherham
19:00 GMT	Kelly (yellow card) 22'; McWilliams 55' (pen.); Ayres 57'; Powell 66'; Raggett 69'	Report	Sangaré 3'; Heskey (yellow card) 18'; Gray 36'; Braithwaite (yellow card) 54'; Parker (yellow card) 69'	Stadium: New York Stadium; Attendance: 1,415 (103 away); Referee: Jamie O'Connor

2 December 2025 Round of 32	Salford City	2–7	Rotherham United	Kersal
19:00 GMT	Siri 8'; Stockton 31'	Report	Ayres 18'; Clarke 22'; Benson 39', 53', 55', (yellow card) 62'; Kelly (yellow card) 79'; Gore 85'; Gardner 89'	Stadium: Moor Lane; Attendance: 519 (153 visitors); Referee: Darren Drysdale

13 January 2026 Round of 16	Huddersfield Town	3–0	Rotherham United	Huddersfield
19:00 GMT	Harness (yellow card) 12'; Alves 36'; Sørensen 41'; Ashia 86'	Report		Stadium: Kirklees Stadium; Attendance: 1,656 (120 visitors); Referee: Stephen Parkinson

== Statistics ==
=== Appearances and goals ===
Players with no appearances are not included on the list; italics indicate a loaned in player

No.	Pos	Nat	Player	Total		League One		FA Cup		EFL Cup		EFL Trophy	
No.	Pos	Nat	Player	Apps	Goals	Apps	Goals	Apps	Goals	Apps	Goals	Apps	Goals
1	GK	(England) ENG	Cameron Dawson	35	0	31+0	0	1+0	0	2+0	0	1+0	0
2	DF	(Republic of Ireland) IRL	Joe Rafferty	48	3	38+4	3	0+0	0	1+1	0	1+3	0
3	DF	(Scotland) SCO	Zak Jules	39	1	30+5	1	0+0	0	1+0	0	3+0	0
4	MF	(Scotland) SCO	Liam Kelly	25	0	11+10	0	0+0	0	1+0	0	3+0	0
5	DF	(England) ENG	Sean Raggett	13	1	4+5	0	0+0	0	1+0	0	3+0	1
6	DF	(England) ENG	Reece James	44	2	36+2	1	1+0	0	2+0	0	1+2	1
7	MF	(England) ENG	Joe Powell	36	1	29+1	0	1+0	0	1+1	0	0+3	1
8	MF	(England) ENG	Kian Spence	22	3	17+4	2	0+0	0	0+0	0	1+0	1
9	FW	(England) ENG	Jordan Hugill	35	2	20+8	2	1+0	0	2+0	0	3+1	0
10	FW	(England) ENG	Sam Nombe	32	13	25+6	12	1+0	1	0+0	0	0+0	0
11	DF	(Curaçao) CUW	Ar'jany Martha	47	2	24+17	1	1+0	0	2+0	1	2+1	0
13	GK	(England) ENG	Ted Cann	19	0	15+0	0	0+0	0	0+0	0	4+0	0
14	DF	(Democratic Republic of the Congo) COD	Marvin Kaleta	19	0	8+8	0	0+0	0	1+1	0	1+0	0
15	DF	(England) ENG	Jamal Baptiste	41	1	33+4	1	0+0	0	0+0	0	3+1	0
16	MF	(England) ENG	Dru Yearwood	36	0	13+16	0	1+0	0	2+0	0	4+0	0
17	MF	(England) ENG	Shaun McWilliams	33	3	19+7	2	1+0	0	2+0	0	3+1	1
18	DF	(Scotland) SCO	Lenny Agbaire	20	0	12+6	0	0+0	0	1+0	0	1+0	0
19	MF	(England) ENG	Josh Benson	25	5	14+10	2	0+0	0	0+0	0	1+0	3
20	FW	(England) ENG	Duncan Watmore	13	0	7+6	0	0+0	0	0+0	0	0+0	0
21	FW	(Republic of Ireland) IRL	Joshua Kayode	3	0	1+2	0	0+0	0	0+0	0	0+0	0
22	DF	(Netherlands) NED	Denzel Hall	31	3	22+5	3	1+0	0	1+1	0	1+0	0
23	MF	(England) ENG	Jack Holmes	20	2	4+8	2	0+1	0	0+2	0	5+0	0
24	FW	(England) ENG	Harry Gray	20	3	20+0	3	0+0	0	0+0	0	0+0	0
26	DF	(England) ENG	Hamish Douglas	14	1	9+1	1	1+0	0	0+0	0	2+1	0
27	MF	(England) ENG	Ben Hatton	1	0	0+0	0	0+0	0	0+0	0	0+1	0
28	MF	(Jamaica) JAM	Brandon Cover	10	0	5+5	0	0+0	0	0+0	0	0+0	0
29	FW	(Wales) WAL	Gabriele Biancheri	11	0	2+9	0	0+0	0	0+0	0	0+0	0
35	FW	(Northern Ireland) NIR	Ciaran McGuckin	5	0	0+3	0	0+0	0	1+0	0	1+0	0
36	DF	(Republic of Ireland) IRL	Emmanuel Adegboyega	11	1	7+4	1	0+0	0	0+0	0	0+0	0
37	MF	(England) ENG	James Clarke	13	1	2+5	0	0+1	0	0+1	0	3+1	1
38	MF	(England) ENG	Kane Richardson	2	0	0+0	0	0+0	0	0+0	0	1+1	0
39	DF	(England) ENG	Harrison Duncan	2	0	0+1	0	0+1	0	0+0	0	0+0	0
41	FW	(England) ENG	Josh Ayres	10	2	0+5	0	0+0	0	0+0	0	2+3	2
44	MF	(England) ENG	Dan Gore	41	1	31+3	0	1+0	0	0+2	0	1+3	1
46	FW	(England) ENG	Dean Gardner	3	1	0+0	0	0+1	0	0+0	0	0+2	1
49	DF	(England) ENG	Lino Sousa	5	0	1+4	0	0+0	0	0+0	0	0+0	0
51	MF	(England) ENG	Cohen Lee	4	0	3+1	0	0+0	0	0+0	0	0+0	0
Players who featured but departed the club during the season:
12	DF	(England) ENG	Tom Holmes	8	0	3+4	0	0+0	0	0+0	0	1+0	0
20	FW	(Netherlands) NED	Martin Sherif	10	2	4+3	2	0+1	0	0+1	0	1+0	0
29	FW	(England) ENG	Kion Etete	14	0	6+5	0	0+0	0	1+0	0	2+0	0
