= Dan Gore =

English footballer (born 2004)

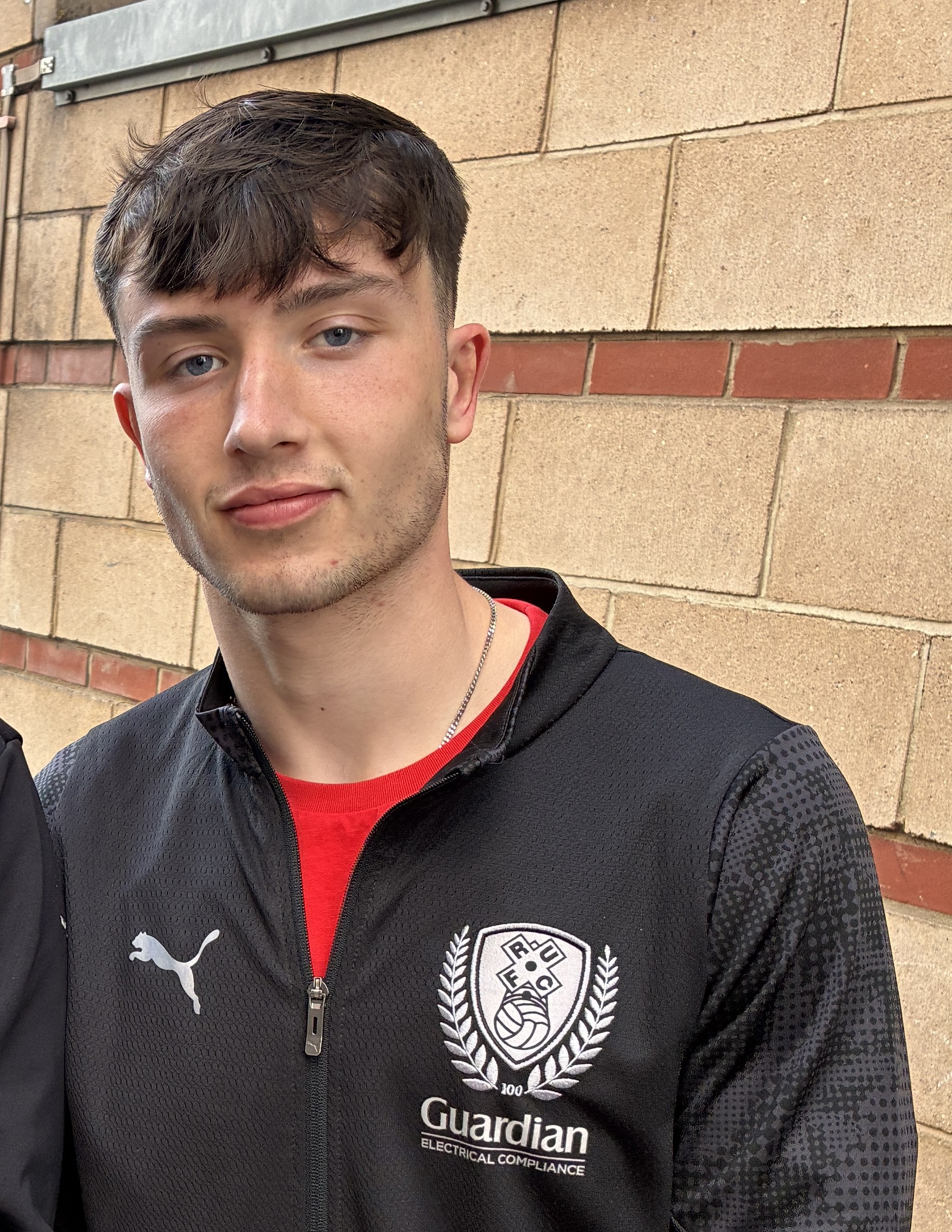
- Gore in 2026

Personal information
- Full name: Daniel Lewis Gore
- Date of birth: 26 September 2004 (age 22)
- Place of birth: Prestwich, England
- Height: 5 ft 7 in (1.70 m)
- Position: Defensive midfielder

Team information
- Current team: Luton Town (on loan from Manchester United)
- Number: 16

Youth career
- –2018: Burnley
- 2018–2023: Manchester United

Senior career*
Years	Team	Apps	(Gls)
2023–	Manchester United	1	(0)
2024	→ Port Vale (loan)	1	(0)
2025	→ Rotherham United (loan)	3	(0)
2025–2026	→ Rotherham United (loan)	34	(0)
2026–	→ Luton Town (loan)	8	(0)

International career
2020	England U16	3	(1)
2021–2022	England U18	5	(1)
2023	England U20	2	(0)
- * Club domestic league appearances and goals as of 19:00, 21 November 2026 (UTC)

Daniel Lewis Gore (born 26 September 2004) is an English professional footballer who plays as a defensive midfielder for EFL League One club Luton Town, on loan from Premier League club Manchester United.

Since making his first-team debut for Manchester United in 2023, he has also played on loan at Port Vale and Rotherham United. Gore played youth international football for England up to under-20 level.

== Club career ==
Gore joined the Manchester United academy in 2018, having previously been at Burnley from the age of eight. He played as part of the 2022 FA Youth Cup winning United side. He was voted the United reserve team Player of the Year for the 2022–23 season.

In August 2023, as well as featuring for the club in the EFL Trophy, Gore was included in Manchester United's first-team squad and on 26 August for the first time was named as a substitute in the Premier League match against Nottingham Forest. On 26 September, he made his debut against Crystal Palace in the EFL Cup. He made his league debut on 26 December, when he came on as a 94th-minute substitute for Christian Eriksen at home to Aston Villa.

On 23 January 2024, Gore joined League One club Port Vale on a six-month loan. David Flitcroft, the club's director of football, said that higher-level clubs had pursued Gore but that United "selected us based on how we play and how we support young players". He injured his quads on his debut at Vale Park, a 1–0 defeat to Portsmouth on 27 January. Speaking in April, manager Darren Moore confirmed that Gore would not be returning to the club. He underwent surgery on a dislocated shoulder in June 2024 and returned to training five months later.

On 31 January 2025, Gore joined League One club Rotherham United on loan for the remainder of the 2024–25 season. He played one game for the Millers before returning to Manchester to receive treatment for a hairline foot fracture. Rotherham manager Steve Evans initially described it as "the strangest thing in the world" and that "we didn't do enough in training for him to have a sore nose let alone a sore foot". Evans later stated that he had discovered Gore had suffered "a delayed reaction" and "he wants to play... he needs to be playing". He returned to fitness in April.

On 17 July 2025, Gore returned to Rotherham United on a season-long loan deal. In contrast to his previous loan spells, he managed to establish himself in the first XI. The loan was such a success that manager Matt Hamshaw feared Gore would be recalled in January and loaned out to a club higher up the football pyramid. Gore was highly praised for his performances across the 2025–26 campaign.

On 31 August 2026, Gore joined League One club Luton Town on a season-long loan.

== International career ==
Gore played youth international football for England at under-16, under-18 and under-20 levels.

In February 2020, Gore scored a goal for the England under-16 team in a victory against the United States. The following year saw him represent England at under-18 level. In October 2023, Gore was called up to the England under-20 team for matches against Romania and Portugal. He made his under-20 debut on 12 October 2023, during a 2–0 defeat away to Romania.

== Style of play ==
Gore is a combative midfielder.

== Career statistics ==
As of match played 21 November 2026

Appearances and goals by club, season and competition
Club	Season	League			FA Cup		EFL Cup		Europe		Other		Total	
Club	Season	Division	Apps	Goals	Apps	Goals	Apps	Goals	Apps	Goals	Apps	Goals	Apps	Goals
Manchester United U21	2022–23	—	—		—		—		—		3 (Note: Appearance(s) in the EFL Trophy)	0	3	0
Manchester United U21	2023–24	—	—		—		—		—		2	0	2	0
Manchester United U21	2024–25	—	—		—		—		—		1	0	1	0
Manchester United U21	Total		0	0	0	0	0	0	0	0	6	0	6	0
Manchester United	2023–24	Premier League	1	0	0	0	1	0	0	0	—		2	0
Manchester United	2024–25	Premier League	0	0	0	0	0	0	0	0	—		0	0
Manchester United	2025–26	Premier League	0	0	0	0	0	0	—		—		0	0
Manchester United	2026–27	Premier League	0	0	0	0	0	0	0	0	—		0	0
Manchester United	Total		1	0	0	0	1	0	0	0	0	0	2	0
Port Vale (loan)	2023–24	League One	1	0	—		—		—		—		1	0
Rotherham United (loan)	2024–25	League One	3	0	—		—		—		0	0	3	0
Rotherham United (loan)	2025–26	League One	34	0	1	0	2	0	—		4	1	41	1
Rotherham United (loan)	Total		37	0	1	0	2	0	—		4	1	44	1
Luton Town (loan)	2026–27	League One	8	0	1	0	—		—		3	0	12	0
Career total			47	0	2	0	3	0	0	0	13	1	65	1

== Honours ==
Manchester United U18

- FA Youth Cup: 2021–22

Individual

- Denzil Haroun Reserve Player of the Year: 2021–22
