= Ciaran McGuckin =

Northern Irish footballer

Personal information
- Full name: Ciaran Reece McGuckin
- Date of birth: 30 December 2003 (age 22)
- Place of birth: Leeds, England
- Height: 6 ft 0 in (1.82 m)
- Position: Striker

Team information
- Current team: Harrogate Town
- Number: 35

Youth career
- 2014–2021: Rotherham United

Senior career*
Years	Team	Apps	(Gls)
2021–2026	Rotherham United	9	(0)
2022–2023	→ Scarborough Athletic (loan)	24	(5)
2024	→ Dundalk (loan)	5	(0)
2024	→ Yeovil Town (loan)	6	(3)
2025	→ Yeovil Town (loan)	20	(2)
2025	→ Eastleigh (loan)	5	(2)
2026–	Harrogate Town	12	(2)

International career^{‡}
2018	Northern Ireland U16	8	(1)
2019	Northern Ireland U17	4	(1)
2021	Northern Ireland U19	6	(1)
2022–2024	Northern Ireland U21	13	(3)
- * Club domestic league appearances and goals as of 08:25, 18 October 2026 (UTC) ‡ National team caps and goals as of 10:13, 25 October 2024 (UTC)

Ciaran Reece McGuckin (born 30 December 2003) is a professional footballer who plays as a striker for National League side Harrogate Town. Born in England, he is a youth international for Northern Ireland.

== Career ==
McGuckin is a product of Rotherham United's youth academy, having joined in 2014. He made his senior and professional debut with Rotherham United in a 5–0 EFL Trophy win over the Manchester City U21s on 26 October 2021, where he made an assist. On 8 April 2022, he signed his first professional contract with Rotherham United. He joined National League club Scarborough Athletic on loan for the 2022–23 season. On 5 May 2023, he returned to Rotherham United and extended his professional contract with them. On 1 February 2024, McGuckin signed for League of Ireland Premier Division club Dundalk on loan until the summer.

On 19 September 2024, McGuckin signed for National League club Yeovil Town on loan until January 2025. On 25 October 2024, after scoring three goals in seven games for Yeovil, McGuckin was recalled by Rotherham United. On 7 January 2025, he returned to Yeovil Town on loan for the remainder of the season. On 25th April 2025, McGuckin was named the Yeovil Town Young Player of the Season and awarded the Bobby Hamilton Trophy.

On 4 October 2025, McGuckin joined National League club Eastleigh on loan until January 2026. McGuckin's loan spell with Eastleigh was ended prematurely after he suffered a season ending knee injury. On 8 May 2026 Rotherham announced he was being released after the team's relegation to EFL League Two.

== International career ==
McGuckin is a youth international for Northern Ireland, having played up to the Northern Ireland U21s.

== Career statistics ==
As of match played 17 October 2026

Appearances and goals by club, season and competition
Club	Season	League			FA Cup		EFL Cup		Other		Total	
Club	Season	Division	Apps	Goals	Apps	Goals	Apps	Goals	Apps	Goals	Apps	Goals
Rotherham United	2021–22	League One	0	0	0	0	0	0	1 (Note: Appearance(s) in EFL Trophy)	0	1	0
Rotherham United	2022–23	Championship	0	0	0	0	0	0	—		0	0
Rotherham United	2023–24	Championship	3	0	0	0	2	0	—		5	0
Rotherham United	2024–25	League One	3	0	0	0	0	0	0	0	3	0
Rotherham United	2025–26	League One	3	0	0	0	1	0	1	0	5	0
Rotherham United	Total		9	0	0	0	3	0	2	0	14	0
Scarborough Athletic (loan)	2022–23	National League North	24	5	—		—		2 (Note: Appearances in North Riding Senior Cup)	1	26	6
Dundalk (loan)	2024	LOI Premier Division	5	0	—		—		—		5	0
Yeovil Town (loan)	2024–25	National League	26	5	1	0	—		0	0	27	5
Eastleigh (loan)	2025–26	National League	5	2	2	0	—		0	0	7	2
Harrogate Town	2026–27	National League	12	2	1	1	—		0	0	13	3
Career total			81	14	4	1	3	0	4	1	92	16
