= Josh Ayres =

English footballer (born 2005)

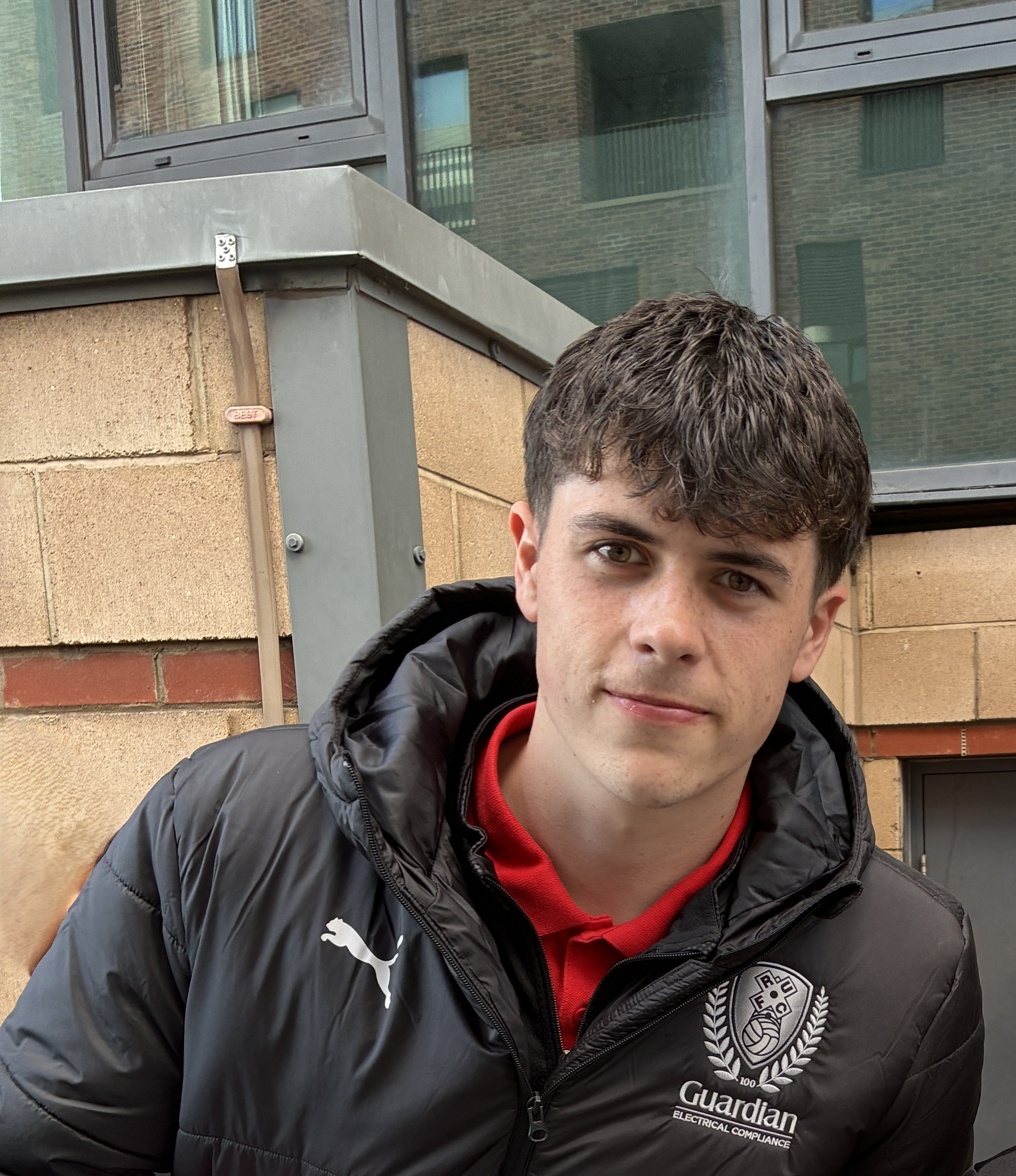
- Ayres in 2026

Personal information
- Full name: Joshua George Ayres
- Date of birth: 24 November 2005 (age 20)
- Place of birth: England
- Position: Forward

Team information
- Current team: Walton & Hersham (on loan from Woking)
- Number: 26

Youth career
- Rotherham United

Senior career*
| Years | Team | Apps | (Gls) |
| 2024–2026 | Rotherham United | 5 | (0) |
| 2024 | → Buxton (loan) | 1 | (0) |
| 2024–2025 | → Sheffield (loan) | 12 | (7) |
| 2025 | → Matlock Town (loan) | 4 | (0) |
| 2025 | → Emley (loan) | 5 | (2) |
| 2025 | → Cleethorpes Town (loan) | 3 | (0) |
| 2025 | → Gainsborough Trinity (loan) | 1 | (0) |
| 2026 | → Alfreton Town (loan) | 11 | (5) |
| 2026– | Woking | 4 | (0) |
| 2026– | → Walton & Hersham (loan) | 6 | (0) |
- * Club domestic league appearances and goals as of 20:37, 16 November 2026 (UTC)

Joshua George Ayres (born 24 November 2005) is an English professional footballer who plays as a forward for National League South club Walton & Hersham on loan from National League side Woking.

== Career ==
=== Rotherham United ===
On 18 September 2023, Ayres signed his first professional contract with Rotherham United. On 10 August 2024, he joined National League North side Buxton on a month-long loan. On 29 October 2024, he then joined Sheffield on a month-long loan. His loan was then extended until January 2025. On 7 February 2025, he joined Northern Premier League side Matlock Town on loan until the end of the season, on 20 March 2025, he had then moved to Emley on loan.

He made his professional debut for Rotherham United on 4 February 2025, in a 1–0 defeat to Bradford City in the EFL Trophy. On 20 August 2025, he joined Cleethorpes Town on a month-long loan. On 30 September 2025, he joined Gainsborough Trinity on a month-long loan.

He scored his first goal for Rotherham United on 28 October 2025, in a 4–2 win against Manchester City U21 in the EFL Trophy. On 22 January 2026, he joined National League North side Alfreton Town on loan until the end of the season. On 18 March 2026, he was recalled from his loan.

=== Woking ===
On 28 May 2026, Ayres agreed to join National League side, Woking on a one-year deal with an additional option year.

On 1 October 2026, Ayres went on loan to National League South side Walton & Hersham on an initial one month loan.

== Career statistics ==
As of match played 14 November 2026

Appearances and goals by club, season and competition
| Club | Season | League | | | FA Cup | | EFL Cup | | Other | | Total | |
| Club | Season | Division | Apps | Goals | Apps | Goals | Apps | Goals | Apps | Goals | Apps | Goals |
|---|---|---|---|---|---|---|---|---|---|---|---|---|
| Rotherham United | 2024–25 | League One | 0 | 0 | 0 | 0 | 0 | 0 | 1 (Note: Appearances in EFL Trophy) | 0 | 1 | 0 |
| Rotherham United | 2025–26 | League One | 5 | 0 | 0 | 0 | 0 | 0 | 5 | 2 | 10 | 2 |
| Rotherham United | Total | | 5 | 0 | 0 | 0 | 0 | 0 | 6 | 2 | 11 | 2 |
| Buxton (loan) | 2024–25 | National League North | 1 | 0 | 0 | 0 | — | | 0 | 0 | 1 | 0 |
| Sheffield (loan) | 2024–25 | Northern Premier League Division One East | 12 | 7 | 0 | 0 | — | | 2 (Note: Appearances in Sheffield & Hallamshire Senior Cup) | 1 | 14 | 8 |
| Matlock Town (loan) | 2024–25 | Northern Premier League Premier Division | 4 | 0 | — | | — | | — | | 4 | 0 |
| Emley (loan) | 2024–25 | Northern Premier League Division One East | 5 | 2 | — | | — | | 1 (Note: Appearances in Northern Premier League play-offs) | 0 | 6 | 2 |
| Cleethorpes Town (loan) | 2025–26 | Northern Premier League Premier Division | 3 | 0 | 1 | 0 | — | | 0 | 0 | 4 | 0 |
| Gainsborough Trinity (loan) | 2025–26 | Northern Premier League Premier Division | 1 | 0 | — | | — | | 1 (Note: Appearances in FA Trophy) | 0 | 2 | 0 |
| Alfreton Town (loan) | 2025–26 | National League North | 11 | 5 | — | | — | | — | | 11 | 5 |
| Woking | 2026–27 | National League | 4 | 0 | 0 | 0 | — | | 2 (Note: Appearance(s) in National League Cup) | 0 | 6 | 0 |
| Walton & Hersham (loan) | 2026–27 | National League South | 6 | 0 | — | | — | | 1 (Note: Appearance in FA Trophy) | 0 | 7 | 0 |
| Career total | | | 51 | 14 | 1 | 0 | 0 | 0 | 13 | 3 | 65 | 17 |
