= Ted Cann =

English footballer (born 2000)

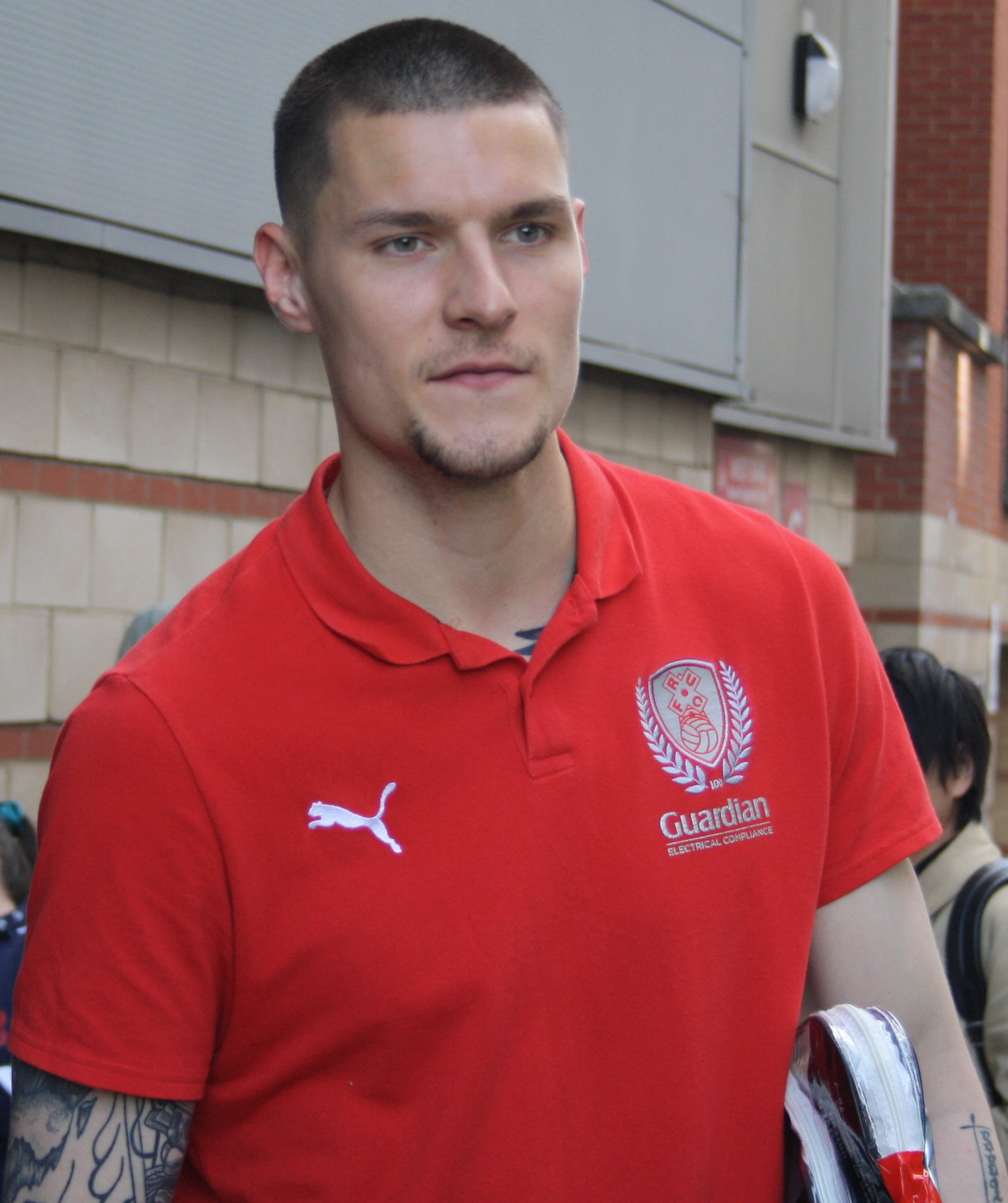
- Cann in 2026

Personal information
- Full name: Ted Barnaby Cann
- Date of birth: 27 December 2000 (age 25)
- Height: 6 ft 7 in (2.01 m)
- Position: Goalkeeper

Team information
- Current team: Rotherham United
- Number: 13

Youth career
- Liverpool
- 2017–2019: West Bromwich Albion

Senior career*
Years	Team	Apps	(Gls)
2019–2025	West Bromwich Albion	0	(0)
2019	→ Worcester City (loan)	5	(0)
2020	→ Yeovil Town (loan)	2	(0)
2021–2022	→ AFC Telford United (loan)	4	(0)
2022	→ Yeovil Town (loan)	5	(0)
2023	→ Leamington (loan)	19	(0)
2025	→ Forest Green Rovers (loan)	6	(0)
2025–	Rotherham United	21	(0)
- * Club domestic league appearances and goals as of 14:07, 22 November 2026 (UTC)

Ted Barnaby Cann (born 27 December 2000) is an English professional footballer who plays as a goalkeeper for EFL League Two club Rotherham United.

== Career ==
=== West Bromwich Albion ===
After playing for Liverpool, Cann joined West Bromwich Albion at the age of 16, in 2017.

He joined Worcester City in August 2019, with the loan being extended later that month. He moved on loan to Yeovil Town in January 2020.

He joined AFC Telford United on loan in November 2021, returning to West Brom in January 2022.

He returned to Yeovil Town on loan in March 2022.

He joined Leamington on loan in February 2023.

He signed a new contract with West Brom in July 2024.

On 29 March 2025, Cann joined National League club Forest Green Rovers on loan in until the end of the season. He made his debut for the club the same day, keeping a clean sheet in a 1–0 win against Solihull Moors.

=== Rotherham United ===
On 23 June 2025, Cann signed for League One club Rotherham United on a two-year contract. He made his debut for the club on 2 September 2025, in a 1–0 defeat to Bolton Wanderers in the EFL Trophy. In October he suffered a concussion in training. He made his Football League debut on 24 February 2026, in a 1–0 defeat to Bradford City.

== Career statistics ==
As of match played 21 November 2026

Appearances and goals by club, season and competition
Club	Season	League			FA Cup		EFL Cup		Other		Total	
Club	Season	Division	Apps	Goals	Apps	Goals	Apps	Goals	Apps	Goals	Apps	Goals
West Bromwich Albion	2019–20	Championship	0	0	0	0	0	0	—		0	0
West Bromwich Albion	2020–21	Premier League	0	0	0	0	0	0	—		0	0
West Bromwich Albion	2021–22	Championship	0	0	0	0	0	0	—		0	0
West Bromwich Albion	2022–23	Championship	0	0	0	0	0	0	—		0	0
West Bromwich Albion	2023–24	Championship	0	0	0	0	0	0	0	0	0	0
West Bromwich Albion	2024–25	Championship	0	0	0	0	0	0	—		0	0
West Bromwich Albion	Total		0	0	0	0	0	0	0	0	0	0
West Bromwich Albion U21	2020–21	—			—		—		2 (Note: Appearances in EFL Trophy)	0	2	0
Worcester City (loan)	2019–20	Midland Football League Premier Division	5	0	2	0	—		0	0	7	0
Yeovil Town (loan)	2019–20	National League	2	0	0	0	—		1 (Note: Appearance(s) in FA Trophy)	0	3	0
AFC Telford United (loan)	2021–22	National League North	4	0	0	0	—		2	0	6	0
Yeovil Town (loan)	2021–22	National League	5	0	0	0	—		0	0	5	0
Leamington (loan)	2022–23	National League North	19	0	0	0	—		0	0	19	0
Forest Green Rovers (loan)	2024–25	National League	6	0	0	0	—		1 (Note: Appearance in National League play-offs)	0	7	0
Rotherham United	2025–26	League One	15	0	0	0	0	0	4	0	19	0
Rotherham United	2026–27	League Two	6	0	1	0	1	0	3	0	11	0
Rotherham United	Total		21	0	1	0	1	0	7	0	30	0
Career total			62	0	3	0	1	0	13	0	79	0

== Honours ==
West Bromwich Albion U23

- Premier League Cup winner: 2021–22
