= James Clarke (footballer, born 2006) =

English footballer

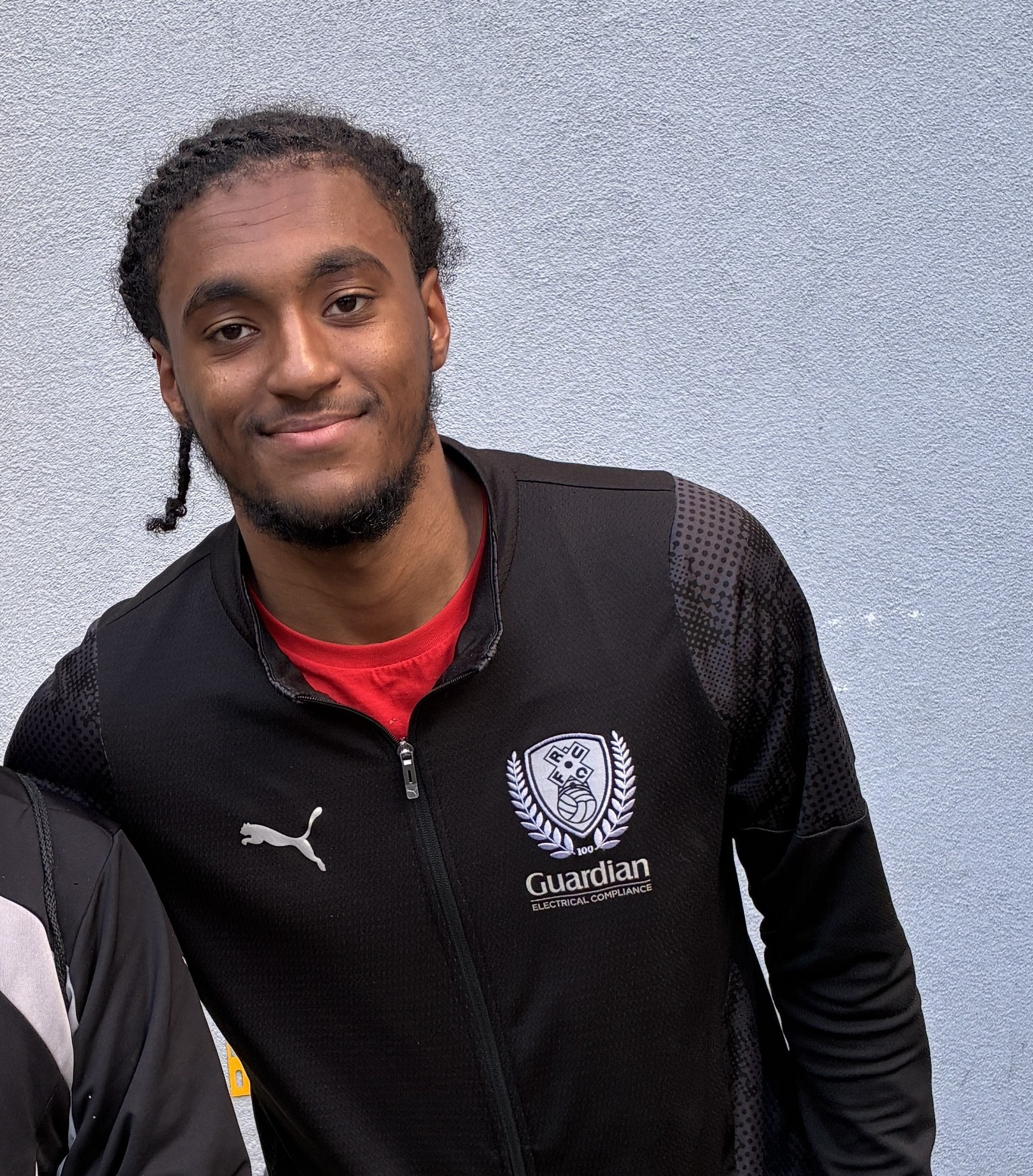
- Clarke in 2026

Personal information
- Full name: James Anthony Clarke
- Date of birth: 22 October 2006 (age 20)
- Place of birth: Manchester, England
- Height: 1.84 m (6 ft 0 in)
- Position: Attacking midfielder

Team information
- Current team: Rotherham United
- Number: 37

Youth career
- –2025: Rotherham United

Senior career*
Years	Team	Apps	(Gls)
2025–	Rotherham United	7	(0)
2025	→ Brighouse Town (loan)	2	(0)
- * Club domestic league appearances and goals as of 2 May 2026 (UTC)

James Anthony Clarke (born 22 October 2006) is an English professional footballer who plays as a attacking midfielder for EFL League Two club Rotherham United.

== Career ==
=== Rotherham United ===
On 29 May 2025, Clarke signed his first professional contract with the club penning a two-year contract. He made his debut for the club on 12 August 2025, in a 0–0 draw with Salford City in the EFL Cup which Rotherham won on penalties. On 5 September 2025, he joined Northern Premier League side Brighouse Town on a month-long loan. He scored his first goal for Rotherham United on 2 December 2025, in a 7–2 win against Salford City in the EFL Trophy.

== Career statistics ==
As of match played 2 May 2026

Appearances and goals by club, season and competition
Club	Season	League			FA Cup		EFL Cup		Other		Total	
Club	Season	Division	Apps	Goals	Apps	Goals	Apps	Goals	Apps	Goals	Apps	Goals
Rotherham United	2025–26	League One	7	0	1	0	1	0	4 (Note: Appearances in EFL Trophy)	1	13	1
Career total			7	0	1	0	1	0	4	1	13	1
