= Marvin Kaleta =

English footballer (born 2004)

Personal information
- Full name: Marvin Marvellous Kaleta
- Date of birth: 14 September 2004 (age 22)
- Place of birth: Manchester, England
- Height: 1.80 m (5 ft 11 in)
- Position: Right-back

Team information
- Current team: Rotherham United
- Number: 14

Youth career
- 2015–2020: Manchester City
- 2020–2024: Wolverhampton Wanderers

Senior career*
Years	Team	Apps	(Gls)
2024–2025	Wolverhampton Wanderers	0	(0)
2024–2025	→ Motherwell (loan)	21	(0)
2025–	Rotherham United	16	(0)
- * Club domestic league appearances and goals as of 09:11, 24 March 2026 (UTC)

Marvin Marvellous Kaleta (born 14 September 2004) is an English professional footballer who plays as a right-back for EFL League Two club Rotherham United.

== Club career ==
Kaleta played grassroots football growing up before joining Manchester City academy at under–12 level. In July 2021, he signed scholarship terms with Wolverhampton Wanderers having joined the club the previous season. The following summer, he signed his first professional contract, penning a two-year deal. In July 2024, he joined Scottish Premiership side Motherwell on a season-long loan deal. On 28 July 2024, Kaleta made his professional debut for Motherwell appearing as a substitute in a Scottish League Cup match against Partick Thistle. On 14 September 2024, he made his senior league debut for Motherwell as a substitute in a 2–1 defeat to Aberdeen. At the end of the season, he returned to Wolverhampton after 26 appearances in all competitions. On 23 July 2025, Kaleta joined League One side Rotherham United for an undisclosed fee, signing a two-year deal.

== International career ==
Kaleta is of Congolese descent and was called up to the DR Congo U20 team in October 2023.

== Career statistics ==
As of match played 17 February 2026

Appearances and goals by club, season and competition
Club	Season	League			National cup (Note: Includes FA Cup and Scottish Cup)		League cup (Note: Includes EFL Cup and Scottish League Cup)		Other		Total	
Club	Season	Division	Apps	Goals	Apps	Goals	Apps	Goals	Apps	Goals	Apps	Goals
Wolverhampton Wanderers U21	2022–23	—			—		—		1 (Note: Appearance(s) in EFL Trophy)	0	1	0
Wolverhampton Wanderers U21	2023–24	—			—		—		2	0	2	0
Wolverhampton Wanderers U21	Total		—		—		—		3	0	3	0
Wolverhampton Wanderers	2024–25	Premier League	0	0	0	0	0	0	—		0	0
Motherwell (loan)	2024–25	Scottish Premiership	21	0	1	0	4	0	—		26	0
Rotherham United	2025–26	League One	16	0	0	0	2	0	1	0	19	0
Career total			37	0	1	0	6	0	4	0	48	0
