= Emmanuel Adegboyega =

Irish footballer (born 2003)

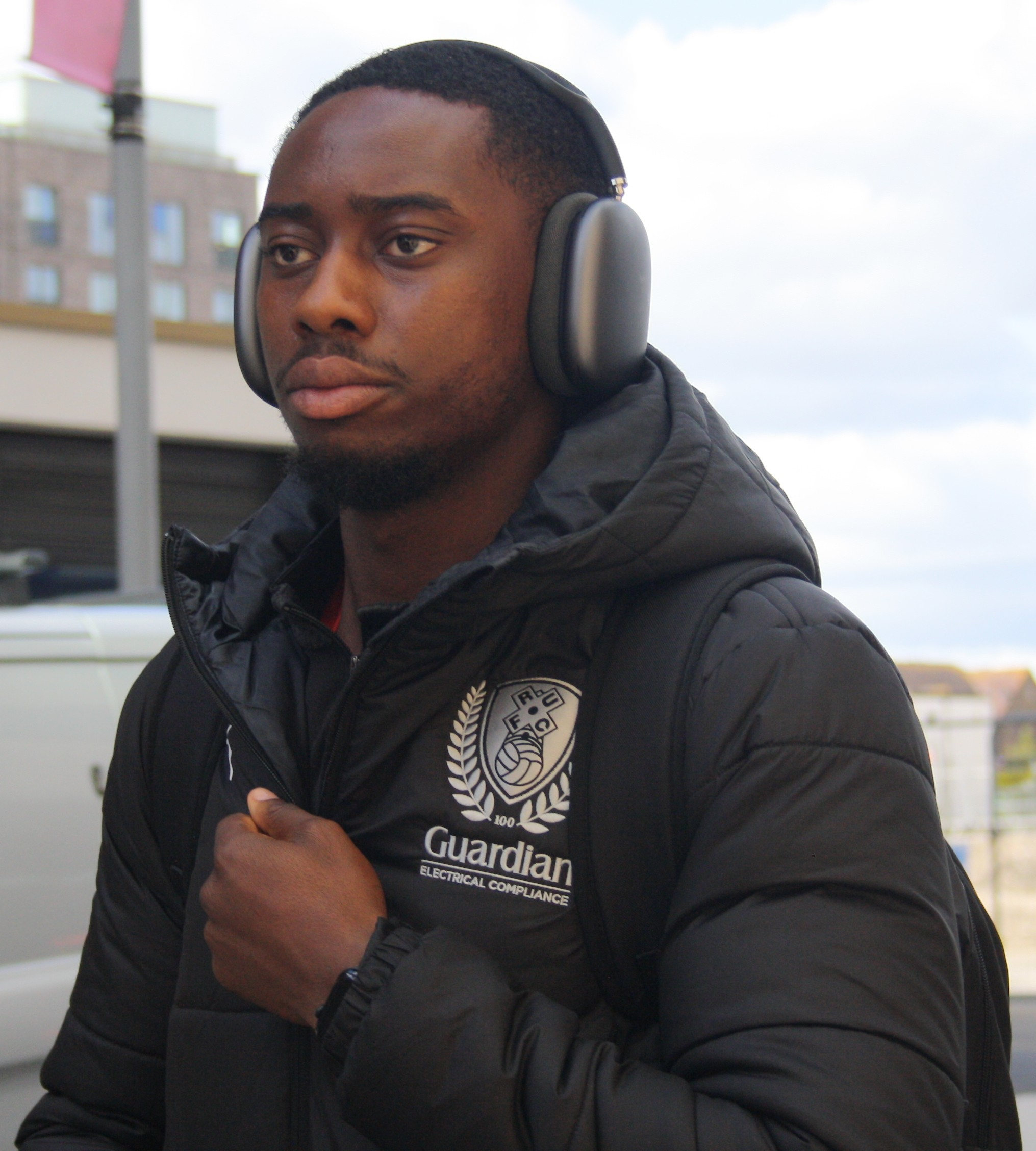
- Adegboyega in 2026

Personal information
- Full name: Emmanuel Oluwanifemi Adegboyega
- Date of birth: 16 September 2003 (age 23)
- Place of birth: Dundalk, Ireland
- Height: 1.91 m (6 ft 3 in)
- Position: Defender

Team information
- Current team: Rotherham United
- Number: 16

Youth career
- 2021: Drogheda United
- 2022: Dundalk

Senior career*
Years	Team	Apps	(Gls)
2023	Drogheda United	22	(1)
2023–2026	Norwich City	0	(0)
2024	→ Walsall (loan)	13	(3)
2024–2025	→ Dundee United (loan)	31	(3)
2026–	Rotherham United	15	(1)

International career^{‡}
2024	Republic of Ireland U21	2	(0)
- * Club domestic league appearances and goals as of 20:05, 6 October 2026 (UTC) ‡ National team caps and goals as of 19:22, 15 October 2024 (UTC)

Emmanuel Oluwanifemi Adegboyega (born 16 September 2003) is an Irish professional footballer who plays as a defender for EFL League Two club Rotherham United.

== Club career ==
Born in Dundalk, Adegboyega played for the youth academies of Drogheda United and Dundalk, before returning to Drogheda United by signing for their first team in January 2023. He scored his first senior goal in March 2023 in a 1–0 win away to UCD, and earned a Man of the Match award in a derby game against former club Dundalk in June 2023.

Adegboyega signed for English club Norwich City in August 2023, initially playing for the under-21 team, and he moved on loan to Walsall in January 2024. Having scored three goals in four appearances to help his side into play-off contention, he was named EFL Young Player of the Month for February 2024.

In August 2024, he moved on loan to Scottish Premiership club Dundee United.

In January 2026, after being linked with a transfer to Stevenage, he signed for Rotherham United on an 18-month contract, for an undisclosed fee.

== International career ==
Adegboyega made his debut for the Republic of Ireland U21 team in a 2025 UEFA European Under-21 Championship qualification Group A fixture as they drew 1–1 with Norway on 11 October 2024.

== Career statistics ==
As of match played 6 October 2026

Appearances and goals by club, season and competition
Club	Season	League			National cup (Note: Includes FAI Cup, FA Cup, Scottish Cup)		League cup (Note: Includes EFL Cup, Scottish League Cup)		Other		Total	
Club	Season	Division	Apps	Goals	Apps	Goals	Apps	Goals	Apps	Goals	Apps	Goals
Drogheda United	2023	LOI Premier Division	22	1	0	0	—		0	0	22	1
Norwich City	2023–24	Championship	0	0	0	0	0	0	—		0	0
Norwich City	2024–25	Championship	0	0	0	0	0	0	—		0	0
Norwich City	2025–26	Championship	0	0	0	0	0	0	—		0	0
Norwich City	Total		0	0	0	0	0	0	0	0	0	0
Walsall (loan)	2023–24	League Two	13	3	1	0	0	0	0	0	14	3
Dundee United (loan)	2024–25	Scottish Premiership	31	3	1	0	2	0	—		34	3
Rotherham United	2025–26	League One	11	1	0	0	0	0	0	0	11	1
Rotherham United	2026–27	League Two	4	0	0	0	1	0	2 (Note: Appearances in the EFL Trophy)	0	7	0
Rotherham United	Total		15	1	0	0	1	0	12!0	18	1	
Career total			81	8	2	0	3	0	2	0	88	8

== Honours ==
Individual

- EFL Young Player of the Month: February 2024
