= Kian Spence =

English footballer (born 2001)

Personal information
- Full name: Kian Alec Spence
- Date of birth: 9 January 2001 (age 25)
- Place of birth: Harrogate, England
- Height: 1.78 m (5 ft 10 in)
- Position: Midfielder

Team information
- Current team: Rotherham United
- Number: 8

Youth career
- –2019: Middlesbrough

Senior career*
Years	Team	Apps	(Gls)
2019–2020	Scarborough Athletic	20	(0)
2020–2023	FC Halifax Town	64	(6)
2020	→ Scarborough Athletic (loan)	2	(0)
2023–2025	Barrow	77	(14)
2025–	Rotherham United	32	(2)
- * Club domestic league appearances and goals as of 21:54, 3 November 2026 (UTC)

Kian Alec Spence (born 9 January 2001) is an English professional footballer who plays as a midfielder for Rotherham United.

== Career ==
Born in Harrogate, Spence began his career with the youth team at Middlesbrough, before signing for non-league club Scarborough Athletic in July 2019. He left the club in September 2020. After a trial, he signed for FC Halifax Town in October 2020, before immediately returning to Scarborough on loan. After playing for Halifax, Spence spoke about his development at the club.

He moved to Barrow in June 2023. He won the EFL League Two Goal of the Month for August 2023.

In June 2025 he signed for Rotherham United.

== Career statistics ==
As of match played 3 November 2026

Appearances and goals by club, season and competition
Club	Season	League			FA Cup		League Cup		Other		Total	
Club	Season	Division	Apps	Goals	Apps	Goals	Apps	Goals	Apps	Goals	Apps	Goals
Scarborough Athletic	2019–20	NPL Premier Division	20	0	3	0	0	0	2 (Note: One appearance in the FA Trophy, one appearance in the Northern Premier League Challenge Cup)	0	25	0
FC Halifax Town	2020–21	National League	8	0	0	0	0	0	0	0	8	0
FC Halifax Town	2021–22	National League	37	4	4	1	0	0	2 (Note: Appearances in the FA Trophy)	1	43	6
FC Halifax Town	2022–23	National League	19	2	2	0	0	0	0	0	21	2
FC Halifax Town	Total		64	6	6	1	0	0	2	1	72	8
Scarborough Athletic (loan)	2020–21	NPL Premier Division	2	0	0	0	0	0	0	0	2	0
Barrow	2023–24	League Two	45	9	2	0	1	0	1 (Note: Appearance(s) in the EFL Trophy)	0	49	9
Barrow	2024–25	League Two	32	5	0	0	3	0	2	0	37	5
Barrow	Total		77	14	2	0	4	0	3	0	86	14
Rotherham United	2025–26	League One	21	2	0	0	0	0	1	1	22	3
Rotherham United	2026–27	League Two	11	0	0	0	1	0	3	0	15	0
Rotherham United	Total		32	2	0	0	1	0	4	1	37	3
Career total			195	22	11	1	5	0	11	2	222	25
