= Hamish Douglas =

English footballer

Personal information
- Full name: Hamish Hubertus Douglas
- Date of birth: 4 June 2005 (age 21)
- Place of birth: Nottingham, England
- Position: Defender

Team information
- Current team: Rotherham United
- Number: 26

Youth career
- 2017–2023: Rotherham United

Senior career*
Years	Team	Apps	(Gls)
2023–	Rotherham United	12	(1)
2023–2024	→ Gainsborough Trinity (loan)	32	(1)
2024–2025	→ Warrington Town (loan)	31	(0)
- * Club domestic league appearances and goals as of 17 February 2026 (UTC)

Hamish Hubertus Douglas (born 4 June 2005) is an English professional footballer who plays as a defender for EFL League Two club Rotherham United.

== Career ==
=== Rotherham United ===
Having joined the club aged 12, Douglas signed his first professional contract with Rotherham United on 15 December 2022, penning a two-and-a-half-year contract. On 22 September 2023, he joined Gainsborough Trinity on loan. On 4 October 2024, he joined National League North side Warrington Town on an month-long loan. On 8 April 2025, he was recalled from his loan spell.

Douglas made his debut for Rotherham United on 8 April 2025, in a 1–0 win against Bolton Wanderers. On 6 June 2025, he signed a new two-year contract with the club. He scored his first goal for the club on 4 November 2025, in a 2–2 draw with Burton Albion.

== Career statistics ==
As of match played 17 February 2026

Appearances and goals by club, season and competition
Club	Season	League			FA Cup		EFL Cup		Other		Total	
Club	Season	Division	Apps	Goals	Apps	Goals	Apps	Goals	Apps	Goals	Apps	Goals
Rotherham United	2023–24	Championship	0	0	0	0	0	0	—		0	0
Rotherham United	2024–25	League One	2	0	0	0	0	0	0	0	2	0
Rotherham United	2025–26	League One	10	1	1	0	0	0	3 (Note: Appearances in EFL Trophy)	0	14	1
Rotherham United	Total		12	1	1	0	0	0	3	0	16	1
Gainsborough Trinity (loan)	2023–24	Northern Premier League	32	1	0	0	—		1 (Note: Appearances in FA Trophy)	0	33	1
Warrington Town (loan)	2024–25	National League North	31	0	0	0	—		0	0	31	0
Career total			75	2	1	0	0	0	4	0	80	2
