= Jamal Baptiste =

English footballer (born 2003)

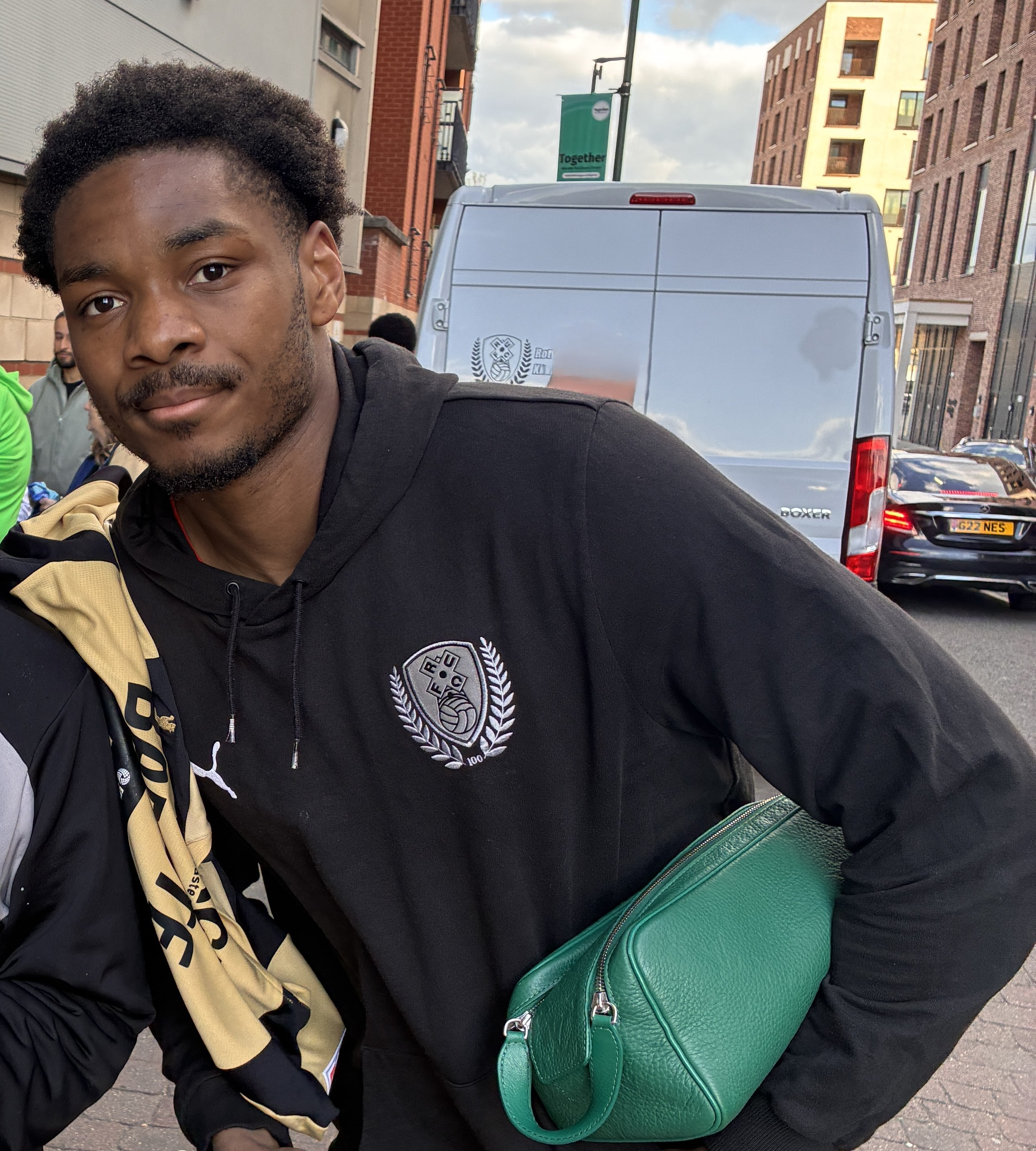
- Baptiste in 2026

Personal information
- Full name: Jamal Marcus Baptiste
- Date of birth: 11 November 2003 (age 23)
- Place of birth: Redbridge, England
- Height: 1.85 m (6 ft 1 in)
- Position: Centre-back

Team information
- Current team: Sheffield United
- Number: 33

Youth career
- 2011–2020: West Ham United

Senior career*
Years	Team	Apps	(Gls)
2020–2023	West Ham United	0	(0)
2023–2024	Manchester City	0	(0)
2023	→ Lommel (loan)	3	(0)
2024–	Sheffield United	5	(0)
2025–2026	→ Rotherham United (loan)	29	(1)

International career^{‡}
2019	England U16	6	(0)
2019	England U17	2	(0)
2021	England U19	6	(0)
- * Club domestic league appearances and goals as of 20 October 2026 (UTC) ‡ National team caps and goals as of 20:45, 13 November 2021 (UTC)

Jamal Marcus Baptiste (born 11 November 2003) is an English professional footballer who plays as a centre-back for EFL Championship club Sheffield United.

== Club career ==
Baptiste joined West Ham United at the age of eight. In the 2018–19 season, Baptiste broke into West Ham's under-18 squad, whilst still a schoolboy. Baptiste later debuted for the under-23s at the age of 15, becoming the second youngest ever player to represent West Ham's under-23 side. Upon his 17th birthday, on 11 November 2020, Baptiste signed his first professional contract with West Ham. On 23 January 2021, Baptiste made his debut, as a substitute, for West Ham in a 4–0 FA Cup win against Doncaster Rovers. On 9 December 2021, he played a full-match for West Ham in a 1–0 home defeat against Dinamo Zagreb in the Europa League.

In May 2023, Baptiste said he would be leaving West Ham at the end of the 2022–23 season as he felt he had played sufficient academy level football and was ready to play in a first-team environment. He also revealed a diagnosis of Guillain–Barré syndrome which had kept him out of the game for five months, and the help he had received with treatment from the personal doctor of West Ham chairman, David Sullivan.

On 2 September 2023, Baptiste made a move to English club Manchester City as a free agent, and on the same day, he was loaned out to Belgian side Lommel. The loan was for half a season, until the end of 2023.

Without playing for the club, he was released by Manchester City at the end of the 2023–24 season.

On 5 November 2024, he signed for Championship club Sheffield United, joining the club's under-21s side.

== International career ==
In October 2019, after previously representing England's under-16 side, Baptiste was called up for England's under-17s for the first time.

On 2 September 2021, Baptiste made his debut for England U19, starting a 2–0 victory over Italy U19s at St George's Park.

== Style of play ==
Terry Westley, academy manager at West Ham during Baptiste's formative years, has praised Baptiste's height, power and pace. West Ham defender Angelo Ogbonna has lauded Baptiste's composure, with former West Ham striker Carlton Cole comparing Baptiste to former West Ham academy graduate Rio Ferdinand after coaching Baptiste in the club's academy. Baptiste himself has said he models his game on Virgil van Dijk and former West Ham and England defender Matthew Upson.

== Career statistics ==
As of match played 9 December 2021

Appearances and goals by club, season and competition
Club	Season	League			FA Cup		EFL Cup		Other		Total	
Club	Season	Division	Apps	Goals	Apps	Goals	Apps	Goals	Apps	Goals	Apps	Goals
West Ham United U21	2019–20	—			—		—		1 (Note: Appearance(s) in EFL Trophy)	0	1	0
West Ham United U21	2020–21	—			—		—		3	0	3	0
West Ham United U21	Total		0	0	0	0	0	0	4	0	4	0
West Ham United	2020–21	Premier League	0	0	1	0	0	0	0	0	1	0
West Ham United	2021–22	Premier League	0	0	0	0	0	0	1 (Note: Appearance(s) in UEFA Europa League)	0	1	0
West Ham United	2022–23	Premier League	0	0	0	0	0	0	0	0	0	0
West Ham United	Total		0	0	1	0	0	0	1	0	2	0
Career total			0	0	1	0	0	0	5	0	6	0
