= Brandon Cover =

Jamaican footballer

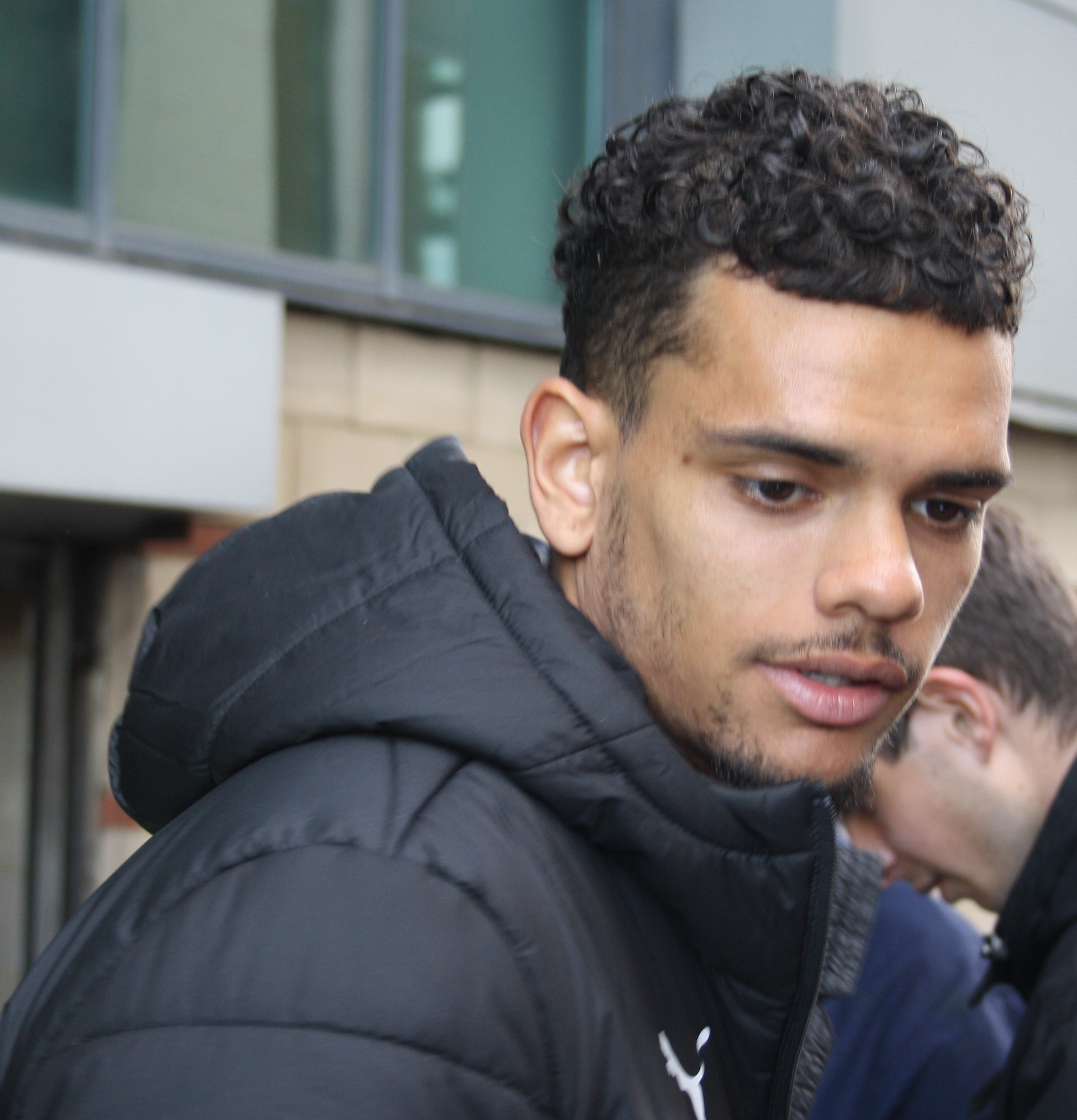
- Cover in 2026

Personal information
- Full name: Brandon Ashley Cover
- Date of birth: 25 September 2003 (age 23)
- Place of birth: Colchester, England
- Height: 1.87 m (6 ft 2 in)
- Positions: Midfielder; full-back

Team information
- Current team: Rotherham United
- Number: 28

Youth career
- 2010–2024: Leicester City

Senior career*
Years	Team	Apps	(Gls)
2024–2026	Leicester City	0	(0)
2024–2025	→ Port Vale (loan)	19	(2)
2025	→ Fleetwood Town (loan)	8	(0)
2026–	Rotherham United	17	(1)

International career^{‡}
2023	Jamaica U23	3	(0)
2023–	Jamaica	5	(0)
- * Club domestic league appearances and goals as of 18:23, 19 September 2026 (UTC) ‡ National team caps and goals as of 21:45, 2 October 2026 (UTC)

Brandon Ashley Cover (born 25 September 2003) is a professional footballer who plays as a midfielder or full-back for EFL League Two club Rotherham United. Born in England, he plays for the Jamaica national team.

Cover began his career at Leicester City, making his professional debut in January 2024. He played on loan at Port Vale and Fleetwood Town, before being sold to Rotherham United in February 2026.

== Club career ==
=== Leicester City ===
Cover joined the Leicester City youth academy at the age of seven. In June 2022, he signed a scholarship contract with Leicester City and also began training with the first-team under Brendan Rodgers. He signed a professional contract with the club in October 2022. He was praised by coach Ben Petty for his performance at right-back in an EFL Trophy defeat at Fleetwood Town in November 2023. On 27 January 2024, Cover made his first-team debut under Enzo Maresca in a 3–0 FA Cup win over Birmingham City at the King Power Stadium. He played every minute of the under-21 team's 2023–24 Premier League 2 campaign and went on to train with the first-team under new manager Steve Cooper in pre-season.

On 30 August 2024, Cover joined League Two club Port Vale on loan for the 2024–25 season. He made his club and league debut one day later in a 2–3 home loss against Doncaster Rovers. He started his time at Vale Park at right-back for the "Valiants" and earned praise from manager Darren Moore for defending against highly rated winger James Berry and helping to keep a clean sheet against Chesterfield on 14 September. He scored his first professional goal on 28 September as a matchwinner in a 2–1 home win over Swindon Town in the league. He was sent back to Leicester on 22 January 2025 after having scored two goals in 20 appearances with the Vale now having Mitch Clark, Kyle John and Tom Sang all fit and available to play at right-back.

On 31 January 2025, Cover returned to League Two on loan, joining Fleetwood Town for the remainder of the 2024–25 season. He said that the move to Highbury Stadium was perfect for his development. He made four starts and four substitute appearances for Fleetwood. Cover signed his second professional contract with Leicester in September 2025.

=== Rotherham United ===
On 2 February 2026, Cover joined League One side Rotherham United for an undisclosed fee. He made five starts and five substitute appearances in the second half of the 2025–26 season, which culminated in relegation.

== International career ==
Born in England, Cover is of Jamaican descent through his father. On 19 June 2023, he made his senior debut for Jamaica as a substitute in a 2–1 friendly loss to Jordan at the Stadion Wiener Neustadt. He was called up to the Jamaica U23s for the 2023 Central American and Caribbean Games. He was next called up for the 2026 Unity Cup.

== Style of play ==
Cover is a versatile player who can play as a midfielder or at full-back. He is composed on the ball and tends to make tough tackles.

== Career statistics ==
=== Club ===
As of match played 19 September 2026

Appearances and goals by club, season and competition
Club	Season	League			FA Cup		EFL Cup		Other		Total	
Club	Season	Division	Apps	Goals	Apps	Goals	Apps	Goals	Apps	Goals	Apps	Goals
Leicester City U21	2022–23	—			—		—		2 (Note: Appearances in EFL Trophy)	0	2	0
Leicester City U21	2023–24	—			—		—		3	0	3	0
Leicester City U21	Total		0	0	0	0	0	0	5	0	5	0
Leicester City	2023–24	Championship	0	0	1	0	0	0	—		1	0
Leicester City	2024–25	Premier League	0	0	0	0	0	0	—		0	0
Leicester City	2025–26	Championship	0	0	0	0	0	0	—		0	0
Leicester City	Total		0	0	1	0	0	0	0	0	1	0
Port Vale (loan)	2024–25	League Two	19	2	1	0	0	0	0	0	20	2
Fleetwood Town (loan)	2024–25	League Two	8	0	—		—		—		8	0
Rotherham United	2025–26	League One	10	0	—		—		—		10	0
Rotherham United	2026–27	League Two	7	1	0	0	1	0	0	0	8	1
Rotherham United	Total		17	1	0	0	1	0	0	0	18	1
Career total			44	3	2	0	1	0	5	0	52	3

=== International ===
As of match played 2 October 2026

Appearances and goals by national team and year
National team	Year	Apps	Goals
Jamaica	2023	1	0
Jamaica	2026	4	0
Total		5	0
