= Lenny Agbaire =

Scottish footballer

Personal information
- Full name: Lenny Nosa Oboghene Agbaire
- Date of birth: 4 March 2005 (age 21)
- Place of birth: Croydon, London, England
- Position: Defender

Team information
- Current team: Rotherham United
- Number: 18

Youth career
- 2015–2022: Celtic

Senior career*
Years	Team	Apps	(Gls)
2022–2025	Celtic B	52	(5)
2025	→ Ayr United (loan)	12	(0)
2025–	Rotherham United	18	(0)
- * Club domestic league appearances and goals as of 2 May 2026 (UTC)

Lenny Nosa Oboghene Agbaire (born 4 March 2005) is a Scottish professional footballer who plays as defender for EFL League Two side Rotherham United.

== Club career ==
=== Celtic ===
Agbaire scored his first goal for the B Team on 11 November 2023, in a 2–1 win against Broomhill in the Lowland League. On 22 May 2024, he signed a new two-year contract at Celtic.

On 9 January 2025, Agbaire joined Scottish Championship side Ayr United on loan until the end of the season. He made his debut for the club on 14 January 2025, in a 2–0 win against Dunfermline Athletic. He scored his first goal for the club on 18 January 2025, in a 8–0 win against Broxburn Athletic in the Scottish Cup.

=== Rotherham United ===
On 15 July 2025, Agbaire joined League One side Rotherham United on a three-year contract for an undisclosed fee. He made his debut for the club on 2 August 2025, in a 2–1 win against Port Vale.

== International career ==
On 3 October 2025, Agbaire received his first call-up to the Scotland U21 side.

== Career statistics ==
As of match played 4 November 2025

Appearances and goals by club, season and competition
Club	Season	League			National cup (Note: Includes Scottish Cup)		League cup (Note: Includes EFL Cup)		Other		Total	
Club	Season	Division	Apps	Goals	Apps	Goals	Apps	Goals	Apps	Goals	Apps	Goals
Celtic B	2022–23	Lowland League	4	0	—		—		0	0	4	0
Celtic B	2023–24	Lowland League	29	4	—		—		0	0	29	4
Celtic B	2024–25	Lowland League	19	1	—		—		1 (Note: Appearances in Scottish Challenge Cup)	0	20	1
Celtic B	Total		52	5	0	0	0	0	1	0	53	5
Ayr United (loan)	2024–25	Scottish Championship	12	0	2	1	0	0	2 (Note: Appearances in Scottish Premiership play-offs)	0	16	1
Rotherham United	2025–26	League One	6	0	0	0	1	0	0	0	7	0
Career total			70	5	2	1	1	0	3	0	76	6
