= Denzel Hall =

Jamaican footballer (born 2001)

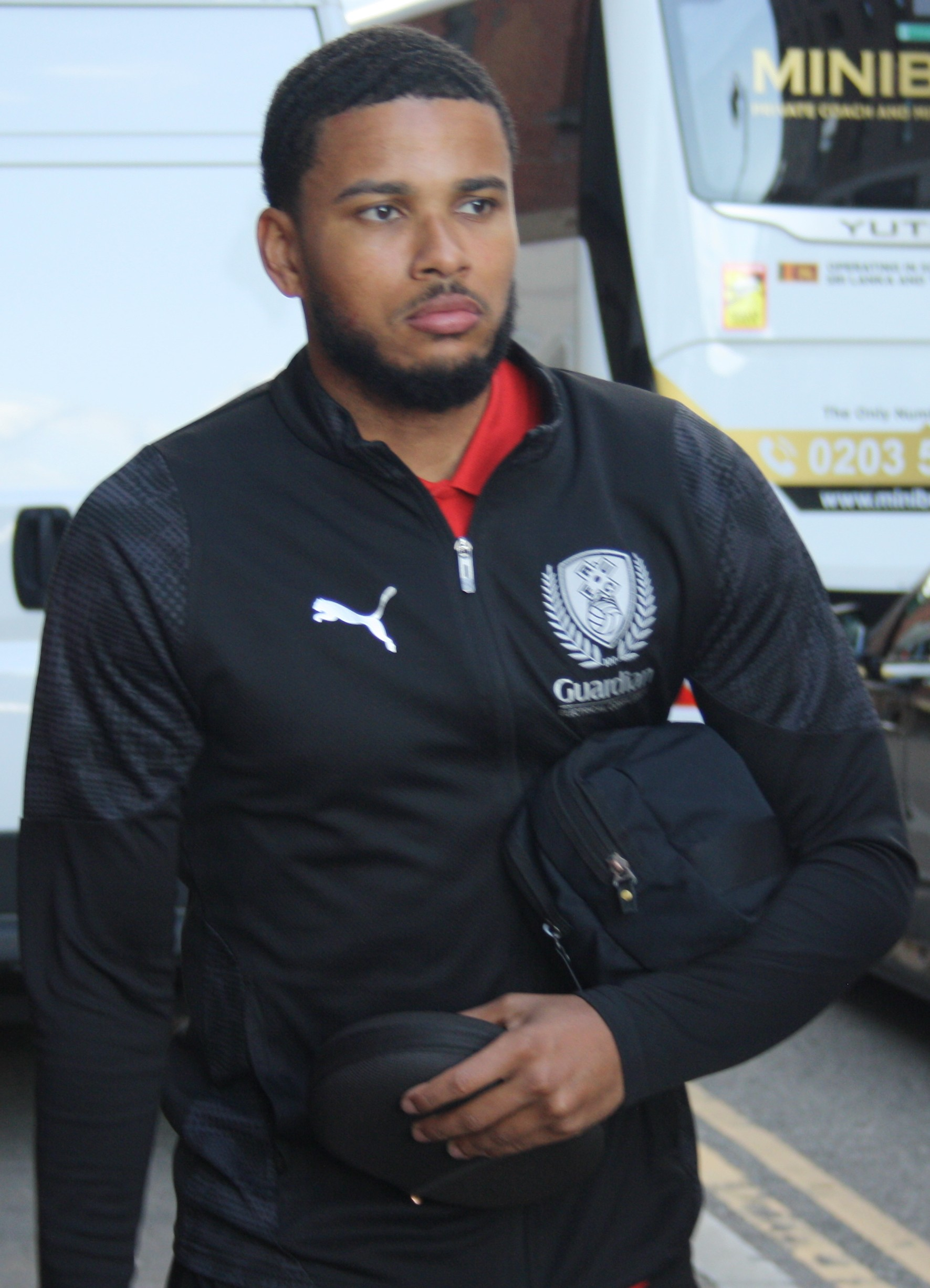
- Hall in 2026

Personal information
- Full name: Denzel Fransico Hall
- Date of birth: 22 May 2001 (age 25)
- Place of birth: Rotterdam, Netherlands
- Height: 1.80 m (5 ft 11 in)
- Position: Right back

Team information
- Current team: Rotherham United
- Number: 12

Youth career
- 2008–2021: Feyenoord

Senior career*
Years	Team	Apps	(Gls)
2021–2023	Feyenoord	2	(0)
2022–2023	→ ADO Den Haag (loan)	32	(1)
2023–2025	Heerenveen	29	(0)
2025–	Rotherham United	34	(3)

International career^{‡}
2015	Netherlands U15	1	(0)
2017	Netherlands U16	6	(0)
2017	Netherlands U17	1	(0)
2026–	Jamaica	1	(0)
- * Club domestic league appearances and goals as of 24 September 2026 ‡ National team caps and goals as of 15 November 2026

Denzel Fransico Hall (born 22 May 2001) is a professional footballer who plays as a right back for EFL League Two club Rotherham United. Born in the Netherlands, he represents the Jamaica national team.

== Club career ==
Born in Rotterdam, Hall came through the Feyenoord Academy and, in December 2020, signed a contract until summer 2024. He made his Eredivisie debut as an 85th-minute substitute in a 4–1 win at NEC Nijmegen on 23 January 2022.

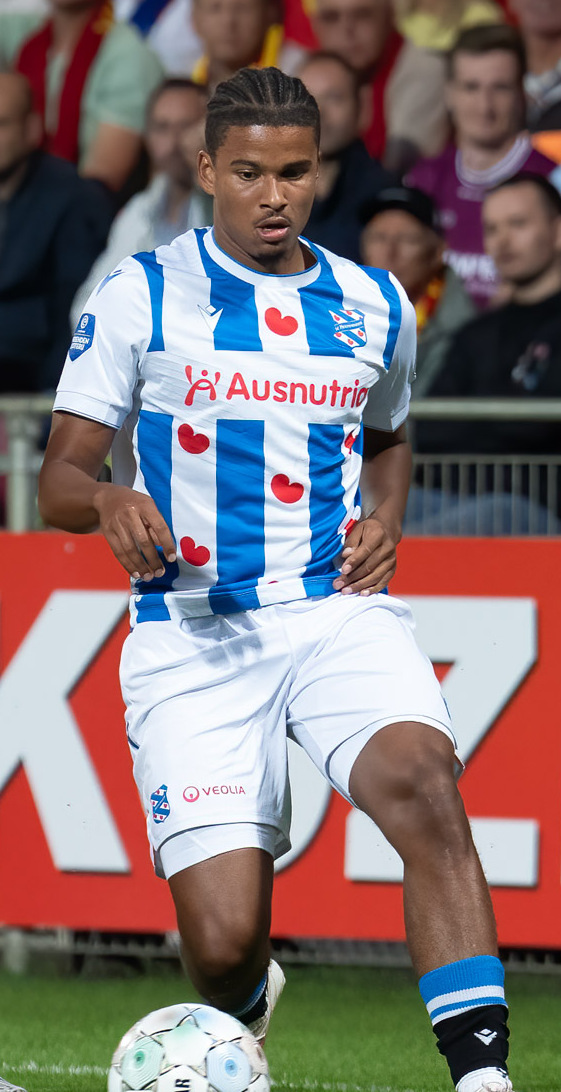
Hall playing for Heerenveen in 2023

On 28 July 2022, Hall was loaned to ADO Den Haag. On 28 October 2022, he scored his first senior goal in ADO Den Haag's 2–1 loss to Helmond Sport.

On 31 July 2023, Hall signed a four-year contract with Heerenveen.

On 25 July 2025, Hall signed for League One club Rotherham United on a three-year deal for an undisclosed fee. On 6 September 2025, Hall scored the only goal in a 1–0 win at home to Exeter City.

== International career ==
Born in the Netherlands, Hall is of Jamaican descent through his father. He played 6 games for the Netherlands national under-16 football team.

== Career statistics ==
As of match played 28 August 2022

Appearances and goals by club, season and competition
Club	Season	League			Cup		Europe		Other		Total	
Club	Season	Division	Apps	Goals	Apps	Goals	Apps	Goals	Apps	Goals	Apps	Goals
Feyenoord	2021–22	Eredivisie	2	0	0	0	0	0	—		2	0
ADO Den Haag (loan)	2022–23	Eerste Divisie	4	0	0	0	—		—		4	0
Career total			6	0	0	0	0	0	0	0	6	0
