= Rotherham United F.C. =

Association football club in England

Rotherham United
- Full name: Rotherham United Football Club
- Nickname: The Millers
- Founded: 27 May 1925; 101 years ago
- Ground: New York Stadium
- Capacity: 12,021
- Chairman: Tony Stewart
- Head coach: Alex Bruce
- League: EFL League Two
- 2025–26: EFL League One, 22nd of 24th (relegated)
- Website: themillers.co.uk
Home colours	Away colours	Third colours

Rotherham United Football Club, nicknamed The Millers, is a professional association football club based in Rotherham, South Yorkshire, England. The club competes in EFL League Two, the fourth tier of English football. The club's colours were initially yellow and black, but changed to red and white around 1930. They have played home matches at the New York Stadium since 2012, having briefly moved to the Don Valley Stadium from their original home at Millmoor in 2008.

The club was formed as a merger between Rotherham County and Rotherham Town in 1925 and were immediately placed in the Football League. They won promotion as champions of the Third Division North in 1950–51 and were beaten finalists in the inaugural League Cup final in 1961, losing to Aston Villa 3–2 on aggregate. After seventeen seasons in the Second Division, relegations followed in 1968 and 1973. Promotion from the Fourth Division was secured in 1974–75 and the club went on to win the Third Division title in 1980–81. Relegations in 1983 and 1988 gave Rotherham the opportunity to win the Fourth Division title in 1988–89, though they had to win another promotion in 1991–92 following relegation the previous season. They beat Shrewsbury Town 2–1 in the 1996 final of the Football League Trophy.

Under the stewardship of Ronnie Moore, Rotherham secured back-to-back promotions in 1999–2000 and 2000–01. They stayed in the second tier for four seasons, though were relegated twice in three years by 2007. The club again secured back-to-back promotions, this time under Steve Evans, securing automatic promotion from League Two in 2012–13 and promotion from League One via the play-offs in 2013–14. The club moved between the Championship and League One for six successive seasons between 2016–17 and 2021–22, winning the play-offs in 2018 as well as the 2022 EFL Trophy final. In the 2025–26 season, Rotherham were relegated to League Two for the first time since the 2012–13 season.

== History ==
The first Rotherham United kit (1925)

The club's roots go back to 1877, when the club was formed as Thornhill Football Club (later Thornhill United). George Cook was the trainer around this time. For many years the leading team in the area was Rotherham Town, who spent three seasons in the Football League while Thornhill United were still playing in the Sheffield & Hallamshire League. By the turn of the century, however, Town had resigned from the Football League and gone out of business; a new club of the same name later joined the Midland League. Meanwhile, Thornhill's fortunes were on the rise to the extent that in 1905 they laid claim to being the pre-eminent club in the town and changed their name to Rotherham County. For a period both clubs competed in the Midland League, finishing first and second in 1911–12. Rotherham County became members of the second division of the Football league in 1919 whilst Rotherham Town failed to become elected to the third division northern section the following year. By 1925 County's fortunes had declined and they had to seek re-election to the third division. By this time it had become clear that to have two professional clubs in the town was not sustainable. Talks had begun in February 1925 and in early May the two clubs merged to form Rotherham United. Days later the reformed club was formally re-elected to the Football League under its new name.

The red and white kit was adopted around 1930 after playing in amber and black, but there was no improvement in the club's fortunes: in 1931 they again had to apply for re-election. Immediately after the Second World War things looked up. The Millers won the only post-war edition of the Football League Third Division North Cup in 1946 beating Chester 5–4 on aggregate. They then finished as runners-up three time in succession between 1947 and 1949 and then were champions of Division Three (North) in 1951. Rotherham reached their highest ever league position of third in the Football League Second Division in 1955, when only goal average denied them a place in the top flight after they finished level on points with champions Birmingham City and runners-up Luton Town. During that season they had notable results including a 6–1 win over Liverpool. In 1961 the Millers beat Aston Villa 2–0 at Millmoor in the inaugural League Cup final first leg; they lost the second leg 3–0 however at Villa Park. The second leg was played the season after due to Villa having a 'Congested Fixture List'. The club held on to its place in Division Two until 1968 and then went into a decline that took them down to Division Four in 1973. In 1975 they were promoted back to the Third Division finishing in the 3rd promotion spot in the Fourth Division. The Millers won the Division Three title in the 1980–81 season, and missed out on a second consecutive promotion by four points, finishing seventh In the second tier (then Division 2) 1981–82. They have not finished this high since. This season also saw Rotherham accomplish their highest-scoring second-tier league double, beating Chelsea 6–0 at home (31 October 1981) and 4–1 away at Stamford Bridge (20 March 1982).

During the 1990s Rotherham were promoted and relegated between the Football League's lowest two divisions and they slipped into the Fourth Division in 1991, just two years after being promoted, but reclaimed their status in the third tier (renamed Division Two for the 1992–93 season due to the launch of the FA Premier League) by finishing third in the Fourth Division in 1992. They survived at this level for five years, never looking like promotion contenders, before being relegated in 1997. In 1996 Rotherham United made their first trip to Wembley, beating Shrewsbury 2–1 to win the Football League Trophy, with two goals from Nigel Jemson giving Rotherham the win, with over 20,000 Rotherham United fans following them. In 1997, just after relegation to Division Three, Ronnie Moore took charge of Rotherham United. His first season ended in a mid-table finish and then his second in a play-off semi-final defeat on penalties to Leyton Orient. In 1999–2000 as Rotherham finished as Division Three runners-up and gained promotion to Division Two, where they finished runners-up and won a second successive promotion.

Chart of historic table positions of Rotherham United in the league

Rotherham managed to remain in Division One for four seasons, and after relegation to League One in 2005, Mick Harford took over as the Millers' manager, but was sacked after a run of 17 games without a win. Harford was replaced by youth team coach, Alan Knill. Early in 2006 it was announced that the club faced an uncertain future unless a funding gap in the region of £140,000 per month could be plugged. An intervention at the latest possible time by a consortium of local businessmen kept them in business. The final match of the 2005–06 season, home to Milton Keynes Dons, was a winner-take-all relegation showdown where a scoreless draw kept Rotherham up. Rotherham United began their second successive year in League One with a 10-point deficit as a result of the CVA which saved the club from liquidation. The club initially pulled the points back but, after losing key playmaker Lee Williamson and star striker Will Hoskins in the January transfer window, the Millers sat 13 points adrift of safety, making the threat of relegation inevitable. This resulted in Knill being sacked on 1 March, with Mark Robins becoming caretaker manager.

Robins's position was made permanent on 6 April 2007, but he was not able to save Rotherham from relegation. The Millers spent the majority of the 2007–08 season in the automatic promotion places but in mid-March 2008 it was revealed that Rotherham had again entered administration and would be deducted 10 points. Local businessman Tony Stewart then took over as chairman for the 2008–09 season and took the club out of administration via a Creditors Voluntary Agreement, resulting in a 17-point deduction. The Millers were subsequently forced to leave Millmoor, their home of over 100 years, for the Don Valley Stadium in Sheffield, after disputes with the landlords. The Millers had a successful season under the new regime, wiping out the point deficit and being in contention for a play-off place. Rotherham were also involved in two cup runs, reaching the Football League Trophy Northern Final and the League Cup last 16. This included victories over higher league opposition in the form of Wolverhampton Wanderers, Southampton, Sheffield Wednesday, Leicester City and Leeds United.

Mark Robins kept the majority of the team together from the 2008–09 campaign, whilst bolstering his squad with high calibre signings in the form of Nicky Law and the prolific goalscorer Adam Le Fondre. The 2009–10 season started well until Robins controversially departed to rivals Barnsley in September, leaving the Millers at the top of the league. Former manager Ronnie Moore replaced him and led the club to their first ever play-off final and first trip to the new Wembley Stadium, where they lost 3–2 loss. In March 2011, following poor form he left Rotherham by mutual consent, and Andy Scott replaced him until he was sacked in March 2012. Steve Evans succeeded him, in the first season at the New York Stadium, and won promotion by finishing second in League Two. In the 2013–14 League One season, Rotherham gained a place in the League One play-offs, where they defeated Preston North End in the semi-finals to set up a second play-off final at Wembley Stadium in four years. In the final against Leyton Orient, the game went to a penalty shoot-out, where two saves from Adam Collin secured a second successive promotion for the club.

In the 2014–15 Championship season, Rotherham's first after a nine-year absence, their survival was jeopardised by a points deduction for fielding the ineligible Farrend Rawson during their home win against Brighton & Hove Albion, Rawson's loan had expired two days prior to the match, and despite the club insisting it was an external administrative error, they were subsequently thrown back into a relegation battle. Safety was secured in the penultimate game of the season with a 2–1 home victory against Reading. Rotherham sold key players from their promotion winning campaigns before the 2015–16 season, including Ben Pringle, Craig Morgan and Kari Arnason. Evans left the club in September and former Leeds United manager Neil Redfearn was appointed as his replacement, being sacked in February 2016 after a run of six defeats in eight games. Neil Warnock was appointed as manager for the rest of the season, and the club stayed up, finishing 21st. Warnock left the club in May 2016 after not agreeing a contract extension. Alan Stubbs became the new Rotherham boss in June 2016, but was sacked in October. Rotherham replaced Stubbs with Kenny Jackett, who himself was replaced with Paul Warne, as Rotherham finished the season bottom of the league and were relegated to League One. As a result, they finished on 24 points, making them hold the current record for the lowest amount of points in a single season in the second division of English football, beating Blackpool FC and Stockport County's 26 points finish.

At the first attempt, Rotherham returned to the Championship, defeating Shrewsbury in the 2018 play-off final. Rotherham were relegated from the Championship the following season on the penultimate game of the campaign. In the 2019–20 season, Rotherham were promoted through points per game in 2nd place behind Coventry City. They were relegated back to League One at the end of the 2020–21 season as they suffered an 88th-minute equaliser against Cardiff City, which sent them down at Derby County's expense. In the 2021–22 season, the Millers were promoted back to the Championship as runners-up, defeating Gillingham 2–0 on the final day of the season. The club also won the 2021–22 EFL Trophy at Wembley Stadium after defeating Sutton United 4–2 after extra time. Early in the 2022–23 season, manager Paul Warne departed for Derby County, being replaced by Exeter City boss Matt Taylor. At the end of the 2023–24 season, Rotherham were relegated back to League One. They suffered a second relegation in three years in the 2025–26 season, returning to the fourth tier for the first time in thirteen years.

== Kit and sponsorship ==
Since 2015, the naming rights to the stadium are currently owned by local multimillion-pound company AESSEAL.

Since 2026, the kits have been supplied by Hummel International.

== Stadium ==
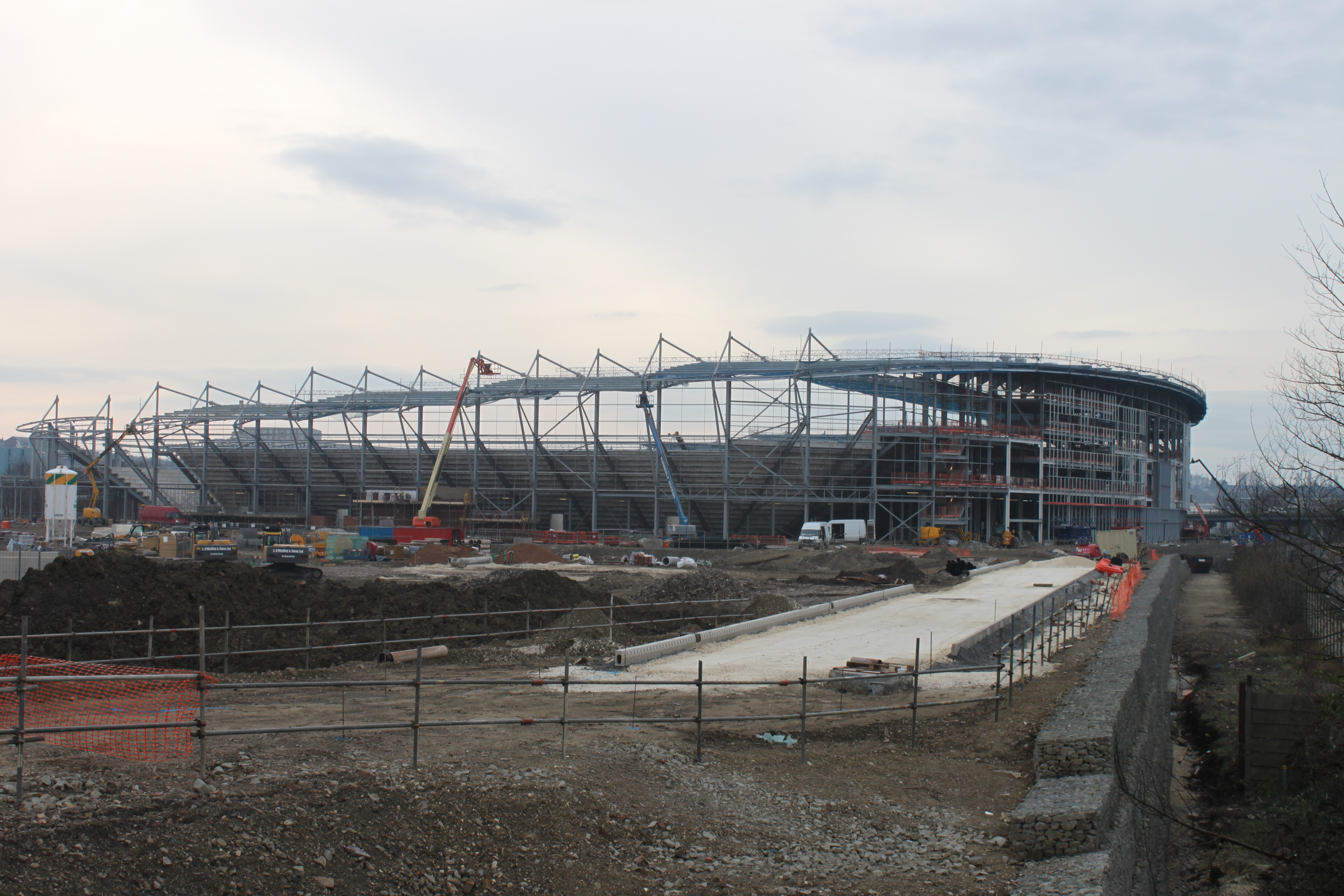
New York Stadium mid-construction (4 Feb 2012)

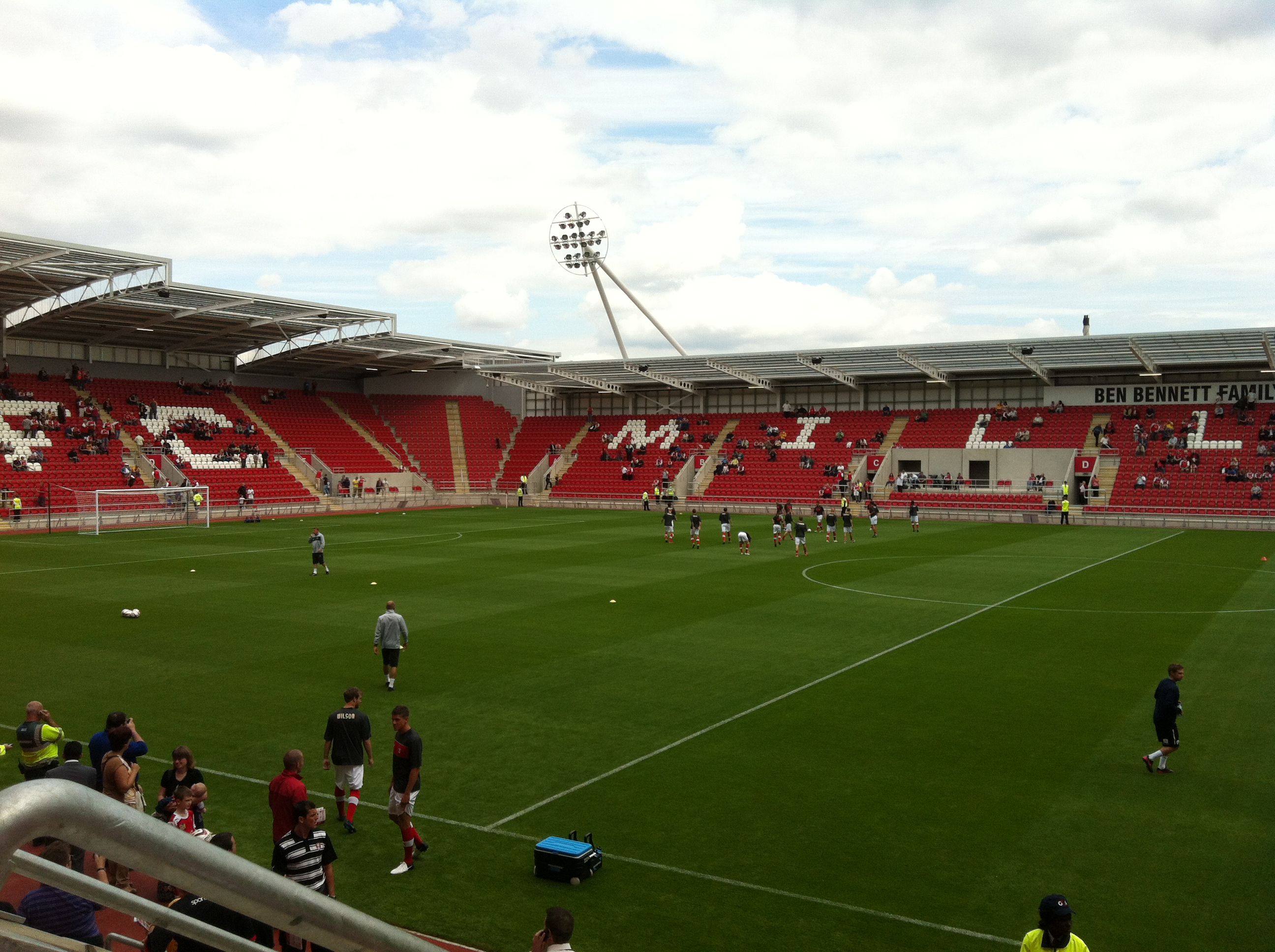
New York Stadium

The club's traditional home was Millmoor in Rotherham where the team played from 1907 to 2008. On one side of the ground is the site of the new Main Stand which remains unfinished. It was hoped that the 4,500 capacity stand which is single tiered, all seated and covered, would be completed sometime during the 2006–07 season, but this had not come to fruition by the time the ground became disused in 2008. On the other side of the ground is the Millmoor Lane Stand, which has a mixture of covered and open seating. Roughly each section on this side is about a third of the length of the pitch. The covered seating in the middle of this stand looks quite distinctive, with several supporting pillars and an arched roof. Both ends are former terraces, with several supporting pillars and have now been made all seated. The larger of the two is the Tivoli End, which was used by home fans. It was noticeable that the pitch sloped up towards this end. The ground also benefits from a striking set of floodlights, the pylons of which are some of the tallest in the country at approximately 124 feet (38 m) high. Following the failure of the owners of the club and the owners of Millmoor to reach a lease agreement the club left for the Don Valley Stadium in Sheffield in 2008.

Whilst a new purpose-built community stadium was being built in Rotherham, the club relocated to the Don Valley Stadium in nearby Sheffield for four seasons from 2008–09 to 2011–12.

In January 2010 the club announced that their new stadium, later named the AESSEAL New York Stadium, would be built on the former Guest and Chrimes foundry site in Rotherham town centre. Preparation work on the site began in February 2010 to make way for the foundations to be put in place and for the old factory to be knocked down to make way for the stadium. Construction started in June 2011 and the first game played at the stadium was a pre-season match between Rotherham and Barnsley, held on 21 July 2012. The Millers won 2–1; the first goal in the stadium was scored by Jacob Mellis of Barnsley, and David Noble scored Rotherham's first goal in their new home. The New York Stadium made its league debut on 18 August 2012, in which Rotherham beat Burton Albion 3–0, Daniel Nardiello scoring the first competitive goal in the ground.

== Supporters ==
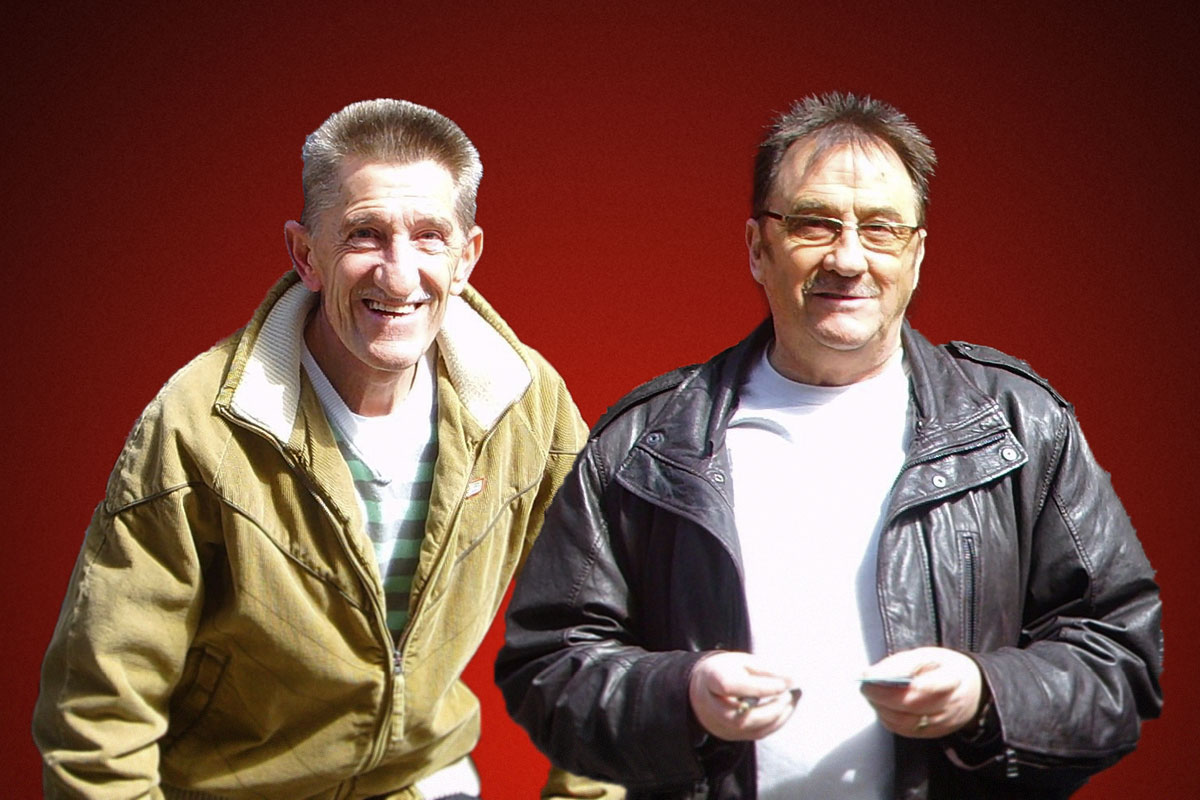
The Chuckle Brothers were appointed as honorary life presidents of Rotherham United F. C. in 2007.

Supporters of Rotherham United include:

- Paul and Barry Chuckle – of the Chuckle Brothers comedy duo, are l honorary life president of the club since 2007, the club appeared in the episode Football Heroes (series 8 episode 5) of their tv series ChuckleVision.

- Howard Webb MBE – former Premier League and FIFA referee, born in Rotherham, who has stated that he has supported the club since childhood.
- Chris Wolstenholme – bassist for the rock band Muse, who grew up in Rotherham and has confirmed his support for the club, following in the footsteps of his father and grandfather.
- Matt Nicholls – drummer for the band Bring Me the Horizon, who has spoken publicly about his lifelong support for Rotherham United.

== Records and statistics ==
- Highest league finish: 3rd, 1954–55 Football League Second Division
- Best FA Cup performance: Fifth round, 1952–53, 1967–68
- Record league victory: 8–0 v. Oldham Athletic, Millmoor, Division 3 North, 26 May 1947
- Record cup victory: 6–0 v. Spennymoor United, FA Cup second round, 17 December 1977, v. Wolverhampton Wanderers, FA Cup first round, 16 November 1985, v. King's Lynn, FA Cup second round, 6 December 1997
- Record defeat: 1–11 v. Bradford City, Division 3 North, 25 August 1928
- Record home attendance at Millmoor: 25,170 v. Sheffield United, Football League Second Division, 13 December 1952
- Record home attendance at Don Valley Stadium: 7,082 v. Aldershot Town, Football League Two play-offs, 19 May 2010
- Record home attendance at the New York Stadium: 11,758 v. Sheffield United, Football League One, 7 September 2013
- Most played opponents in league and cup matches: Lincoln City (94), Doncaster Rovers (84), Crewe Alexandra (79), Bradford City (78), York City (78)
- Opponents with most victories against in league and cup matches: Lincoln City (49), Doncaster Rovers (40), Bradford City (37), Rochdale (36), Chester City (35)
- Opponents with most defeats against in league and cup matches: Chesterfield (41), Wrexham (31), Darlington (30), Walsall (29), Crewe Alexandra (29), Huddersfield Town (29)
- Opponents with most draws against in league and cup matches: Swansea City (25), Doncaster Rovers (22), Lincoln City (21), Walsall (21), Crewe Alexandra (20), York City (20)
- Record league points: 91, Division 2, 2000–01
- Record league goals: 114, Division 3 (N), 1946–47
- Record league goal-scorer: Gladstone Guest, 130 league goals, between 1946 and 1956
- Record cup goal-scorer: Alan Crawford, 18 goals, between 1974 and 1979
- Highest league scorer in a season: Wally Ardron, 38 goals, 1946/47
- Most goals in one match: Jack Shaw, 5 goals v. Darlington, FA Cup, 25 November 1950, won 7–2
- Most internationally capped player: Kári Árnason (36 caps for Iceland)
- Record appearances: Danny Williams, 461 league matches, 39 cup matches, 621 in total
- Youngest player: Kevin Eley, 16 years 71 days, 15 May 1984
- Record transfer fee: £1,000,000 Sam Nombe from Exeter City
- Record fee received: £1,600,000 from Cardiff City for Danny Ward
- Record gate receipts: £106,182 v. Southampton, FA Cup third round, 16 January 2002

== Players ==
=== First-team squad ===
As of 23 October 2026

Note: Flags indicate national team as defined under FIFA eligibility rules; some limited exceptions apply. Players may hold more than one non-FIFA nationality.

No.	Pos.	Nation	Player
1	GK	ENG	Ted Cann
2	DF	IRL	Joe Rafferty
3	DF	SCO	Ewan Otoo
4	MF	ENG	Josh Austerfield
5	DF	TTO	Kieran Ngwenya
6	MF	ENG	Ossama Ashley
7	FW	POR	Fábio Tavares
8	MF	ENG	Kian Spence
9	FW	WAL	Tom Bradshaw
10	FW	ENG	Paul Mullin (captain)
11	DF	CUW	Ar'jany Martha
12	DF	JAM	Denzel Hall
13	GK	USA	Julian Eyestone (on loan from Brentford)
14	DF	ENG	Sonny Aljofree
15	MF	ENG	Jayce Fitzgerald (on loan from Manchester United)
16	DF	IRL	Emmanuel Adegboyega
17	DF	COD	Marvin Kaleta

No.	Pos.	Nation	Player
18	DF	SCO	Lenny Agbaire
20	MF	GRE	Klaidi Lolos (on loan from Peterborough United)
22	MF	ENG	Jamie Jellis
23	MF	FRA	Aaron Nemane
24	DF	ENG	Jili Buyabu (on loan from Sheffield United)
26	DF	ENG	Hamish Douglas
28	DF	JAM	Brandon Cover
30	FW	ENG	Reece Wilson
33	DF	ENG	Brandon Williams
34	MF	ENG	Lewis Clarke
35	MF	ENG	Cohen Lee
36	DF	ENG	Harrison Duncan
37	MF	ENG	James Clarke
38	MF	ENG	Kane Richardson
39	MF	ENG	Dean Gardner
40	MF	ENG	Josh Thornton

== Club management ==
=== Coaching positions ===
As of 7 August 2026

- Director of Football: Steve McClaren
- Director of Football Recruitment: Rob Scott
- Head Coach: Alex Bruce
- Assistant Manager: Steve Agnew
- First Team & Development Coach: Richard Wood
- Goalkeeping Coach: Richard Hartis
- Lead Scout: Warren Spalding
- Head of Performance: Ross Burbeary
- PHD Sports Science Lead: Sam Laycock
- Performance Analyst: Matt Dixon
- Physiotherapists: TBC
- Club Doctor: Dr S. Basu
- Honorary Medical Officers: Dr J. Roberts and Dr S. Sepehri
- Academy Manager: Richard Hairyes
- Head of Academy Coaching: Callum Gilmartin
- Lead Professional Development Phase Coach: Donovan Gethfield
- Lead Youth Development Phase Coach: Jamie Yates
- Lead Foundation Phase Coach: Dan McKenzie
- Head of Academy Physiotherapy: Adrian Littlejohn
- Academy Sports Scientist: Reiss Turton
- Head of Academy Recruitment: Scott Duncanson
- Head of Education and Safeguarding: Matt Ottley
- Academy Player Care Lead: Michael Deaville

=== Managerial history ===
As of 7 August 2026

Name	Nat	From	To	P	W	D	L	Win %
Billy Heald		1 August 1925	1 March 1929	165	55	38	72	33.33
Stan Davies	(Wales)	1 March 1929	31 May 1930	59	18	12	29	30.51
Billy Heald		1 August 1930	31 December 1933	150	49	27	74	32.67
Reg Freeman	(England)	1 January 1934	1 August 1952	523	252	97	174	48.18
Andy Smailes	(England)	1 August 1952	31 October 1958	278	109	50	119	39.21
Tom Johnston	(Scotland)	1 December 1958	1 July 1962	174	63	47	64	36.21
Danny Williams	(England)	1 July 1962	1 February 1965	125	53	21	51	42.40
Jack Mansell	(England)	1 August 1965	31 May 1967	96	34	27	35	35.42
Tommy Docherty	(Scotland)	1 November 1967	30 November 1968	52	16	17	19	30.77
Jim McAnearney	(Scotland)	1 December 1968	1 May 1973	240	92	66	82	38.33
Jimmy McGuigan	(Scotland)	1 May 1973	13 November 1979	341	131	91	119	38.42
Ian Porterfield	(Scotland)	30 December 1979	6 June 1981	71	32	21	18	45.07
Emlyn Hughes	(England)	1 July 1981	21 March 1983	84	31	21	32	36.90
George Kerr	(Scotland)	21 March 1983	31 May 1985	124	44	30	50	35.48
Norman Hunter	(England)	18 June 1985	9 December 1987	137	43	41	53	31.39
John Breckin	(England)	9 December 1987	23 December 1987	2	0	0	2	0.00
Dave Cusack	(England)	23 December 1987	1 April 1988	17	5	8	4	29.41
Billy McEwan	(Scotland)	1 April 1988	1 January 1991	147	54	42	51	36.73
Phil Henson	(England)	1 January 1991	14 September 1994	199	75	55	69	37.69
John McGovern / Archie Gemmill	(Scotland)	14 September 1994	31 July 1996	104	36	31	37	34.62
Danny Bergara	(Uruguay)	1 August 1996	24 May 1997	50	7	14	29	14.00
Ronnie Moore	(England)	24 May 1997	31 January 2005	398	143	121	134	35.93
Alan Knill (caretaker)	(England)	31 January 2005	7 April 2005	74	20	19	35	27.03
Mick Harford	(England)	7 April 2005	10 December 2005	26	5	8	13	19.23
Alan Knill	(England)	10 December 2005	1 March 2007	64	18	17	29	28.13
Mark Robins	(England)	1 March 2007	9 September 2009	129	56	30	43	43.41
Steve Thornber (caretaker)	(England)	9 September 2009	26 September 2009	3	1	2	0	33.33
Ronnie Moore	(England)	26 September 2009	21 March 2011	87	36	21	30	41.38
Andy Liddell (caretaker)	(England)	25 March 2011	15 April 2011	4	1	1	2	25.00
Andy Scott	(England)	16 April 2011	17 March 2012	46	15	14	17	32.61
Darren Patterson (caretaker)	(Northern Ireland)	19 March 2012	11 April 2012	5	4	0	1	80.00
Steve Evans	(Scotland)	9 April 2012	28 September 2015	173	72	45	56	41.62
Eric Black (caretaker)	(Scotland)	1 October 2015	9 October 2015	1	0	0	1	0.00
Neil Redfearn	(England)	9 October 2015	8 February 2016	21	5	2	14	23.81
Neil Warnock	(England)	11 February 2016	18 May 2016	16	6	6	4	37.50
Alan Stubbs	(England)	1 June 2016	19 October 2016	14	1	3	10	7.14
Paul Warne (caretaker)	(England)	19 October 2016	21 October 2016	0	0	0	0	—
Kenny Jackett	(Wales)	21 October 2016	28 November 2016	5	0	1	4	0.00
Paul Warne	(England)	28 November 2016	22 September 2022	176	63	37	76	35.80
Richard Wood / Lee Peltier (caretaker)	(England)	22 September 2022	4 October 2022	1	0	0	1	0.00
Matt Taylor	(England)	4 October 2022	13 November 2023	55	10	18	27	18.18
Wayne Carlisle (caretaker)	(Northern Ireland)	13 November 2023	11 December 2023	4	0	2	2	0.00
Leam Richardson	(England)	11 December 2023	17 April 2024	24	2	4	18	8.33
Steve Evans	(Scotland)	17 April 2024	29 March 2025	50	19	10	21	38.00
Matt Hamshaw	(England)	30 March 2025	18 March 2026	53	16	12	25	30.19
Lee Clark	(England)	18 March 2026	2 May 2026	8	1	2	5	12.50
Alex Bruce	(Northern Ireland)	29 June 2026	Present	0	0	0	0	—

=== Board of directors and ownership ===
- Chairman: Tony Stewart
- Vice-chairman: Richard Stewart
- Chief Executive: Paul Douglas
- Operations Director: Julie Hunt
- Commercial Director: Steve Coakley
- Financial Director: Karen Thomas

== Honours ==
League

- Third Division North / Third Division / Second Division / League One (level 3)
  - Champions: 1950–51, 1980–81
  - 2nd place promotion: 2000–01, 2019–20, 2021–22
  - Play-off winners: 2014, 2018
- Fourth Division / Third Division / League Two (level 4)
  - Champions: 1988–89
  - 2nd place promotion: 1991–92, 1999–2000, 2012–13
  - 3rd place promotion: 1974–75

Cup

- Football League Cup
  - Runners-up: 1960–61
- Football League Trophy / EFL Trophy
  - Winners: 1995–96, 2021–22
- Football League Third Division North Cup
  - Winners: 1945–46
