= List of English football transfers summer 2026 =

The 2026 English football summer transfer window ran from 15 June to 23:00 BST on 1 September 2026. Players without a club could be signed at any time, clubs could sign players on loan dependent on their league's regulations, and clubs could sign a goalkeeper on an emergency loan if they had no registered senior goalkeeper available. This list includes transfers featuring at least one club from either the Premier League or the EFL that were completed after the end of the winter 2025–26 transfer window on 2 February 2026 and before the end of the 2026 summer window.

== Transfers ==
All players and clubs without a flag are English. While Cardiff City, Swansea City and Wrexham (Championship), and Newport County (League Two) are affiliated with the Football Association of Wales and thus take the Welsh flag, they each play in an English league, and so their transfers are included here.

Date	Player	Moving from	Moving to	Fee
6 February 2026	Emmanuel Agbadou	Wolverhampton Wanderers	Beşiktaş	Undisclosed
7 February 2026	Jhon Arias	Wolverhampton Wanderers	Palmeiras	Undisclosed
9 February 2026	Onel Hernández	Unattached	Port Vale	Free
9 February 2026	Grant Ward	Unattached	Port Vale	Free
13 February 2026	Matt Phillips	Unattached	Stevenage	Free
26 February 2026	Zain Silcott-Duberry	Unattached	Sheffield Wednesday	Free
27 February 2026	Trent Koné-Doherty	Liverpool	Molde	Free
27 February 2026	Josh Sargent	Norwich City	Toronto FC	£15.5m
5 March 2026	Angus MacDonald	Unattached	Barrow	Free
20 March 2026	Kaiyne Woolery	Unattached	Tranmere Rovers	Free
26 March 2026	Ryan Watson	Unattached	Tranmere Rovers	Free
27 March 2026	Nathan Redmond	Unattached	Blackburn Rovers	Free
10 June 2026	Vito Mannone	Unattached	Crawley Town	Free
15 June 2026	Dipo Akinyemi	Derry City	York City	Undisclosed
15 June 2026	Chuba Akpom	Ajax	Ipswich Town	Undisclosed
15 June 2026	Moussa Baradji	Yverdon-Sport	Blackburn Rovers	Undisclosed
15 June 2026	Connor Barrett	Walsall	Wigan Athletic	Undisclosed
15 June 2026	Jake Beesley	Burton Albion	Bradford City	Undisclosed
15 June 2026	Modou Kéba Cissé	LASK	Aston Villa	£4m
15 June 2026	Costinha	Olympiacos	Brighton & Hove Albion	£11m
15 June 2026	Isaac Fletcher	Barrow	Shrewsbury Town	Undisclosed
15 June 2026	Ryan Glover	Barnet	Stockport County	Undisclosed
15 June 2026	Ewen Jaouen	Reims	Newcastle United	£18.5m
15 June 2026	Cédric Kipré	Reims	Ipswich Town	Undisclosed
15 June 2026	Cyle Larin	Mallorca	Southampton	Undisclosed
15 June 2026	George Long	Norwich City	Southampton	Undisclosed
15 June 2026	Florentino Luís	Benfica	Burnley	£20.8m
15 June 2026	Ollie Norburn	Notts County	Oldham Athletic	Undisclosed
15 June 2026	Frankie Maguire	Boston United	York City	Undisclosed
15 June 2026	Daniel Peretz	Bayern Munich	Southampton	Undisclosed
15 June 2026	Max Power	Bradford City	Wigan Athletic	Undisclosed
15 June 2026	Jeremy Sarmiento	Brighton & Hove Albion	Middlesbrough	Undisclosed
15 June 2026	Jannik Schuster	Red Bull Salzburg	Brentford	£12m
15 June 2026	Callum Stead	Barnet	Cambridge United	Undisclosed
15 June 2026	David Watson	Kilmarnock	Bolton Wanderers	Undisclosed
15 June 2026	Zadok Yohanna	AIK	Brighton & Hove Albion	£21.5m
16 June 2026	Jenson Metcalfe	Bradford City	Millwall	Undisclosed
17 June 2026	Edon Pruti	Sutton United	Grimsby Town	Undisclosed
17 June 2026	Barney Stewart	Falkirk	West Bromwich Albion	Undisclosed
18 June 2026	Harrison Jones	Sunderland	Peterborough United	Undisclosed
18 June 2026	Charlie McCann	Barrow	Cheltenham Town	Undisclosed
18 June 2026	Jimmy-Jay Morgan	Chelsea	West Bromwich Albion	£4m
18 June 2026	Víctor Muñoz	Osasuna	Liverpool	£34.5m
18 June 2026	Isiah Noel-Williams	Hemel Hempstead Town	Barnet	Undisclosed
18 June 2026	Jan Paul van Hecke	Brighton & Hove Albion	Tottenham Hotspur	£52m
19 June 2026	Jack Maskell	Darlington	Barnet	Undisclosed
19 June 2026	Adam Phillips	Barnsley	Bradford City	Undisclosed
19 June 2026	Ricardo Santos	Swansea City	Sheffield Wednesday	Undisclosed
19 June 2026	Jackson Smith	Barnsley	Port Vale	Undisclosed
20 June 2026	Sam Field	Queens Park Rangers	Norwich City	Undisclosed
20 June 2026	Boy Kemper	NAC Breda	Queens Park Rangers	Undisclosed
20 June 2026	Keiber Lamadrid	Deportivo La Guaira	West Ham United	Undisclosed
22 June 2026	Bobby Clark	Red Bull Salzburg	Derby County	£6m
22 June 2026	Junior Eccleston	Sutton United	Chesterfield	Undisclosed
23 June 2026	Yahya Bamba	Forest Green Rovers	Newport County	Undisclosed
23 June 2026	Kyreece Lisbie	Colchester United	Reading	Undisclosed
23 June 2026	Tom Moore	Southport	Accrington Stanley	Undisclosed
23 June 2026	Jett Murphy	Chelmsford City	West Ham United	Free
23 June 2026	Jordan Shipley	Port Vale	Cheltenham Town	Undisclosed
23 June 2026	Fin Stevens	FC St. Pauli	Leyton Orient	Undisclosed
24 June 2026	Armando Dobra	Chesterfield	Leyton Orient	Undisclosed
24 June 2026	Matt Ingram	Oxford United	West Bromwich Albion	Undisclosed
25 June 2026	Collin Andeng Ndi	Southend United	Peterborough United	Undisclosed
25 June 2026	Andre Brooks	Sheffield United	Norwich City	Undisclosed
25 June 2026	Sam Greenwood	Pogoń Szczecin	Bristol City	Undisclosed
25 June 2026	Piero Hincapié	Bayer Leverkusen	Arsenal	£34.5m
25 June 2026	Sam Tickle	Wigan Athletic	Bristol City	Undisclosed
26 June 2026	Zak Johnson	Sunderland	York City	Undisclosed
26 June 2026	Bobby Kamwa	Newport County	Bristol Rovers	Undisclosed
26 June 2026	Sonny Perkins	Leyton Orient	Wigan Athletic	Undisclosed
26 June 2026	Gibson Yah	Volendam	Bristol City	Undisclosed
27 June 2026	Jonah Kusi-Asare	Bayern Munich	Fulham	Undisclosed
27 June 2026	Jordi Liongola	La Louvière	Sheffield Wednesday	Undisclosed
27 June 2026	Darius Lipsiuc	Stoke City	Notts County	Undisclosed
27 June 2026	Sven Sprangler	St Johnstone	Walsall	Undisclosed
29 June 2026	Rasmus Højlund	Manchester United	Napoli	£38m
29 June 2026	Donyell Malen	Aston Villa	Roma	£21.6m
29 June 2026	Arijanet Muric	Ipswich Town	Sassuolo	Undisclosed
29 June 2026	Frank Onyeka	Brentford	Coventry City	Undisclosed
29 June 2026	Curtis Tilt	Bradford City	Burton Albion	Undisclosed
30 June 2026	Sinclair Armstrong	Bristol City	Göztepe	Undisclosed
30 June 2026	Ethan Brierley	Brentford	Huddersfield Town	Undisclosed
30 June 2026	Ivor Pandur	Hull City	Rangers	£6m
30 June 2026	Udoka Godwin-Malife	Burton Albion	Reading	Undisclosed
30 June 2026	Ivan Mesík	Heracles	Charlton Athletic	Undisclosed
30 June 2026	Stefan Mols	Tamworth	Accrington Stanley	Undisclosed
30 June 2026	Aidon Shehu	Hull City	Panathinaikos	£2.5m
30 June 2026	Pascal Struijk	Leeds United	Brighton & Hove Albion	£20m
1 July 2026	Will Aimson	Wigan Athletic	Salford City	Free
1 July 2026	Jack Aitchison	Exeter City	Bristol Rovers	Free
1 July 2026	Zane Albarus	Brighton & Hove Albion	Gillingham	Free
1 July 2026	Joe Anderson	Barrow	Accrington Stanley	Free
1 July 2026	Danny Andrew	Exeter City	Fleetwood Town	Free
1 July 2026	Josh Andrews	Gillingham	Grimsby Town	Free
1 July 2026	Pele Arganese-McDermott	Tottenham Hotspur	Crawley Town	Free
1 July 2026	Taye Ashby-Hammond	Stevenage	Barnet	Free
1 July 2026	Leon Ayinde	Ipswich Town	Doncaster Rovers	Free
1 July 2026	Odin Bailey	Stockport County	Portsmouth	Free
1 July 2026	Lewis Baker	Stoke City	Bursaspor	Free
1 July 2026	Kofi Balmer	Motherwell	Bristol Rovers	Free
1 July 2026	Enzo Barrenechea	Aston Villa	Benfica	£10.4m
1 July 2026	Harrison Biggins	Shrewsbury Town	Newport County	Free
1 July 2026	James Brophy	Cambridge United	Gillingham	Free
1 July 2026	Neill Byrne	Bradford City	Doncaster Rovers	Free
1 July 2026	Jeremiah Chilokoa-Mullen	Dunfermline Athletic	Wigan Athletic	Undisclosed
1 July 2026	Mitch Clark	Port Vale	Swindon Town	Free
1 July 2026	Callum Connolly	Stockport County	Bradford City	Free
1 July 2026	James Connolly	Crewe Alexandra	Walsall	Free
1 July 2026	Brandon Comley	Walsall	Barnet	Free
1 July 2026	Andy Cook	Bradford City	Grimsby Town	Free
1 July 2026	Matthew Craig	Tottenham Hotspur	Port Vale	Free
1 July 2026	Marc Cucurella	Chelsea	Real Madrid	£47.5m
1 July 2026	Andrew Dallas	Barnsley	Walsall	Free
1 July 2026	Ben Davies	Rangers	Bolton Wanderers	Free
1 July 2026	Josh Davison	Tranmere Rovers	Shrewsbury Town	Free
1 July 2026	Kyle Dempsey	Bolton Wanderers	Port Vale	Free
1 July 2026	Christian Doidge	Forest Green Rovers	Newport County	Free
1 July 2026	Janoi Donacien	Chesterfield	Northampton Town	Free
1 July 2026	Andre Dozzell	Portsmouth	D.C. United	Free
1 July 2026	Martin Dúbravka	Burnley	Tottenham Hotspur	Free
1 July 2026	Stephen Duke-McKenna	Harrogate Town	Crawley Town	Free
1 July 2026	Gwion Edwards	Morecambe	Exeter City	Free
1 July 2026	Owura Edwards	Colchester United	Peterborough United	Free
1 July 2026	Callum Elder	Derby County	Lincoln City	Free
1 July 2026	Bilal El Khannouss	Leicester City	VfB Stuttgart	Undisclosed
1 July 2026	Emmanuel Emegha	Strasbourg	Chelsea	£22m
1 July 2026	Akin Famewo	Hull City	Bolton Wanderers	Undisclosed
1 July 2026	Craig Farquhar	Crystal Palace	Barnet	Free
1 July 2026	Priestley Farquharson	Walsall	Crawley Town	Free
1 July 2026	Ashley Fletcher	Blackpool	Huddersfield Town	Free
1 July 2026	Keenan Forson	Southend United	Oldham Athletic	Free
1 July 2026	Joe Foulkes	Kidderminster Harriers	Grimsby Town	Free
1 July 2026	Ethan Galbraith	Swansea City	Stoke City	£10m
1 July 2026	James Gibbons	Cambridge United	Notts County	Free
1 July 2026	Jordan Gibson	Doncaster Rovers	Crewe Alexandra	Free
1 July 2026	Macaulay Gillesphey	Charlton Athletic	Bradford City	Undisclosed
1 July 2026	Charlie Goode	Stevenage	Milton Keynes Dons	Free
1 July 2026	Will Goodwin	Oxford United	Gillingham	Free
1 July 2026	Anthony Gordon	Newcastle United	Barcelona	£69.3m
1 July 2026	Josh Gordon	Walsall	Exeter City	Free
1 July 2026	Kyron Gordon	Rochdale	Stockport County	Free
1 July 2026	Liam Gordon	Motherwell	Gillingham	Free
1 July 2026	Wes Harding	Millwall	Plymouth Argyle	Free
1 July 2026	Kadeem Harris	Salford City	Gillingham	Free
1 July 2026	Alex Hartridge	Burton Albion	Plymouth Argyle	Free
1 July 2026	Conor Hazard	Plymouth Argyle	Wycombe Wanderers	Free
1 July 2026	Isaac Heath	Everton	Cambridge United	Free
1 July 2026	Krisztián Hegyi	West Ham United	Sparta Prague	Free
1 July 2026	Karl Hein	Arsenal	Werder Bremen	Free
1 July 2026	Bailey Hobson	Chesterfield	Harrogate Town	Free
1 July 2026	James Husband	Blackpool	Doncaster Rovers	Free
1 July 2026	Svante Ingelsson	Sheffield Wednesday	Stoke City	Undisclosed
1 July 2026	Jérémy Jacquet	Rennes	Liverpool	£55m
1 July 2026	Tom James	Leyton Orient	Bristol Rovers	Free
1 July 2026	Raúl Jiménez	Fulham	Wolverhampton Wanderers	Free
1 July 2026	George Johnston	Bolton Wanderers	Luton Town	Free
1 July 2026	Arkell Jude-Boyd	Cheltenham Town	Shrewsbury Town	Free
1 July 2026	Olaf Kobacki	Sheffield Wednesday	Wisła Płock	Undisclosed
1 July 2026	Ibrahima Konaté	Liverpool	Real Madrid	Free
1 July 2026	Billy Koumetio	Dundee	Charlton Athletic	Undisclosed
1 July 2026	Ciarán Kelly	Bradford City	Bristol Rovers	Free
1 July 2026	Frankie Kent	Heart of Midlothian	Oxford United	Free
1 July 2026	Charlie Lakin	Walsall	Barnet	Free
1 July 2026	Sam Long	Bromley	Salford City	Free
1 July 2026	Josh Magennis	Exeter City	Stevenage	Free
1 July 2026	James Maxwell	Doncaster Rovers	Northampton Town	Free
1 July 2026	Charlie McArthur	Newcastle United	York City	Free
1 July 2026	Jon McCracken	Dundee	Bradford City	Free
1 July 2026	George McEachran	Grimsby Town	Chesterfield	Free
1 July 2026	Cameron McGeehan	Northampton Town	Barnsley	Free
1 July 2026	David McGoldrick	Barnsley	Mansfield Town	Free
1 July 2026	Zech Medley	Fleetwood Town	York City	Free
1 July 2026	Jasper Moon	Burton Albion	Port Vale	Free
1 July 2026	Stephan Negru	Oxford United	Swindon Town	Free
1 July 2026	Dan Neil	Sunderland	Rangers	Free
1 July 2026	Zack Nelson	Luton Town	AFC Wimbledon	Free
1 July 2026	Elliott Nevitt	Gillingham	Oldham Athletic	Free
1 July 2026	Lee Nicholls	Huddersfield Town	Preston North End	Undisclosed
1 July 2026	Ilmari Niskanen	Exeter City	Blackpool	Free
1 July 2026	Cameron Norman	Tranmere Rovers	Newport County	Free
1 July 2026	Will Norris	Wycombe Wanderers	Salford City	Free
1 July 2026	Eoghan O'Connell	Barnsley	Stockport County	Free
1 July 2026	Francis Okoronkwo	Everton	Doncaster Rovers	Free
1 July 2026	Marco Palestra	Atalanta	Chelsea	£43m
1 July 2026	Byron Pendleton	Birmingham City	Shrewsbury Town	Free
1 July 2026	Joe Powell	Rotherham United	Salford City	Free
1 July 2026	Ben Purrington	Cambridge United	Bristol Rovers	Free
1 July 2026	Sean Raggett	Rotherham United	Colchester United	Free
1 July 2026	Arthur Read	Colchester United	York City	Free
1 July 2026	Callum Roberts	Scunthorpe United	Notts County	Free
1 July 2026	Andy Robertson	Liverpool	Tottenham Hotspur	Free
1 July 2026	Frankie Runham	Chelsea	Ipswich Town	Undisclosed
1 July 2026	Jon Russell	Barnsley	Mansfield Town	Free
1 July 2026	Nazariy Rusyn	Sunderland	Karpaty Lviv	£600,000
1 July 2026	Max Sanders	Crewe Alexandra	Notts County	Free
1 July 2026	Olly Sanderson	Fulham	Stevenage	Free
1 July 2026	Dan Sassi	Blackpool	Newport County	Free
1 July 2026	Harvey Saunders	Tranmere Rovers	Northampton Town	Free
1 July 2026	Gus Scott-Morriss	Southend United	Oldham Athletic	Free
1 July 2026	Joel Senior	Bristol Rovers	Tranmere Rovers	Free
1 July 2026	Steven Sessegnon	Wigan Athletic	AFC Wimbledon	Free
1 July 2026	Richard Smallwood	Tranmere Rovers	Bristol Rovers	Free
1 July 2026	Marcos Senesi	Bournemouth	Tottenham Hotspur	Free
1 July 2026	Mark Shelton	Barnet	York City	Free
1 July 2026	Bernardo Silva	Manchester City	Real Madrid	Free
1 July 2026	Lewis Simper	Sutton United	Walsall	Free
1 July 2026	Jacob Slater	Brighton & Hove Albion	Tranmere Rovers	Free
1 July 2026	Callum Slattery	Motherwell	Sheffield Wednesday	Free
1 July 2026	Jhon Solís	Girona	Birmingham City	Undisclosed
1 July 2026	Djibril Soumaré	Braga	Stoke City	Undisclosed
1 July 2026	Tony Springett	Norwich City	Leyton Orient	Free
1 July 2026	Pierce Sweeney	Exeter City	Cheltenham Town	Free
1 July 2026	James Storer	Wolverhampton Wanderers	Plymouth Argyle	Free
1 July 2026	Dan Sweeney	Stevenage	AFC Wimbledon	Free
1 July 2026	Fábio Tavares	Burton Albion	Rotherham United	Free
1 July 2026	Terry Taylor	Charlton Athletic	Stevenage	Free
1 July 2026	Josh Thomas	Swansea City	Fleetwood Town	Free
1 July 2026	Joe Tomlinson	Milton Keynes Dons	Cheltenham Town	Free
1 July 2026	Kieran Trippier	Newcastle United	Wolverhampton Wanderers	Free
1 July 2026	Alejo Véliz	Tottenham Hotspur	Bahia	Undisclosed
1 July 2026	Matty Virtue	Fleetwood Town	Swindon Town	Free
1 July 2026	Leo Walta	Sirius	Swansea City	Undisclosed
1 July 2026	Evan Weir	Walsall	Peterborough United	Free
1 July 2026	Harvey White	Stevenage	Plymouth Argyle	Free
1 July 2026	Zac Williams	Crewe Alexandra	Barnet	Free
1 July 2026	Moussa Yeo	Red Bull Salzburg	Swansea City	Undisclosed
2 July 2026	Jacob Brown	Luton Town	Reading	Free
2 July 2026	Jack Butland	Rangers	Hull City	Undisclosed
2 July 2026	Mateus Fernandes	West Ham United	Tottenham Hotspur	£85m
2 July 2026	Luke Graham	Dundee	Stoke City	Undisclosed
2 July 2026	Hayden Hackney	Middlesbrough	Everton	£16m
2 July 2026	Cian Hayes	Peterborough United	Rochdale	Undisclosed
2 July 2026	Jake Leake	Oldham Athletic	Colchester United	Free
2 July 2026	Abraham Odoh	Peterborough United	Salford City	Undisclosed
2 July 2026	Jack Price	Brackley Town	Shrewsbury Town	Free
2 July 2026	Jack Simpson	Leyton Orient	Chesterfield	Free
2 July 2026	Isaac Smith	Manchester City	Barnsley	Undisclosed
2 July 2026	Luca Stephenson	Liverpool	Bolton Wanderers	Undisclosed
2 July 2026	Michael Svoboda	Venezia	Brighton & Hove Albion	£4.3m
2 July 2026	Sil Swinkels	Aston Villa	Sheffield Wednesday	Undisclosed
2 July 2026	Kane Thompson-Sommers	Milton Keynes Dons	Fleetwood Town	Undisclosed
2 July 2026	Joseph Wheeler-Henry	Chelsea	Brentford	Undisclosed
3 July 2026	Nathan Aké	Manchester City	Fenerbahçe	£7m
3 July 2026	Jude Arthurs	Bromley	Crawley Town	Free
3 July 2026	Patrick Bauer	AFC Wimbledon	Cambridge United	Free
3 July 2026	Nathan Baxter	Watford	Leyton Orient	Undisclosed
3 July 2026	Cohen Bramall	Luton Town	Milton Keynes Dons	Free
3 July 2026	Ilias Bronkhorst	Excelsior	Huddersfield Town	Free
3 July 2026	Henry Cartwright	Leicester City	Bradford City	Undisclosed
3 July 2026	Steve Cook	Queens Park Rangers	Wycombe Wanderers	Free
3 July 2026	Dael Fry	Middlesbrough	Birmingham City	Free
3 July 2026	Akeel Higgins	West Bromwich Albion	Wigan Athletic	Undisclosed
3 July 2026	Macaulay Langstaff	Millwall	Salford City	Undisclosed
3 July 2026	Lennon MacLorg	Charlton Athletic	Gillingham	Free
3 July 2026	Myles Peart-Harris	Oxford United	Middlesbrough	Free
3 July 2026	Jed Wallace	West Bromwich Albion	Bristol City	Free
4 July 2026	Azeem Abdulai	Leyton Orient	Hibernian	Undisclosed
4 July 2026	Daniel Barlaser	Middlesbrough	Milton Keynes Dons	Free
4 July 2026	Matthew Dennis	Notts County	Burton Albion	Undisclosed
4 July 2026	Kasey Palmer	Hull City	Luton Town	Undisclosed
4 July 2026	Erik Ring	Lincoln City	Kilmarnock	Undisclosed
4 July 2026	Jahmai Simpson-Pusey	Manchester City	1. FC Köln	Undisclosed
4 July 2026	Jay Turner-Cooke	FC Halifax Town	Shrewsbury Town	Free
5 July 2026	Christy Grogan	Stockport County	Derry City	Undisclosed
5 July 2026	Eliezer Mayenda	Sunderland	Rennes	£22m
5 July 2026	Jimi Tauriainen	Chelsea	Horsens	Free
5 July 2026	Bazoumana Touré	TSG Hoffenheim	Newcastle United	£42m
6 July 2026	Giorgi Chakvetadze	Watford	Udinese	Undisclosed
6 July 2026	Tyrique George	Chelsea	Everton	£18m
6 July 2026	Alfie Pond	Wolverhampton Wanderers	Chesterfield	Undisclosed
6 July 2026	Merlin Röhl	SC Freiburg	Everton	£17.3m
6 July 2026	Mathis Servais	KV Mechelen	Millwall	Undisclosed
6 July 2026	Sandro Tonali	Newcastle United	Tottenham Hotspur	£92.5m
7 July 2026	Jaidon Anthony	Burnley	Brentford	£15m
7 July 2026	Alfie Devine	Tottenham Hotspur	Preston North End	Undisclosed
7 July 2026	Paul Digby	Dundee	Colchester United	Free
7 July 2026	Eoin Kenny	Dundalk	Portsmouth	Undisclosed
7 July 2026	Julian Larsson	Burton Albion	Helsingborgs IF	Undisclosed
7 July 2026	Aaron Nemane	Milton Keynes Dons	Rotherham United	Free
8 July 2026	Emile Acquah	Dundee	Notts County	Undisclosed
8 July 2026	Noah Chilvers	Ross County	Oldham Athletic	Undisclosed
8 July 2026	Emersonn	Toulouse	Ipswich Town	Undisclosed
8 July 2026	Nesta Guinness-Walker	Northampton Town	Aberdeen	Free
8 July 2026	Angus Gunn	Nottingham Forest	San Jose Earthquakes	Free
8 July 2026	Will Jenkins	South Shields	Rochdale	Undisclosed
8 July 2026	Geovany Quenda	Sporting CP	Chelsea	£40m
8 July 2026	Harry Wilson	Fulham	Leeds United	Free
9 July 2026	Barry Bannan	Millwall	Sheffield Wednesday	Undisclosed
9 July 2026	Louie Barry	Aston Villa	Sheffield Wednesday	Undisclosed
9 July 2026	Kamil Conteh	Bristol Rovers	Bromley	Undisclosed
9 July 2026	Laurence Maguire	Milton Keynes Dons	Rochdale	Free
9 July 2026	Illan Meslier	Leeds United	Arsenal	Free
9 July 2026	Óscar Mingueza	Celta Vigo	Crystal Palace	Free
9 July 2026	Ruel Sotiriou	Hapoel Jerusalem	Chesterfield	Free
9 July 2026	Sean Steur	Ajax	Newcastle United	£23m
9 July 2026	Cole Stockton	Salford City	Accrington Stanley	Free
9 July 2026	Mark Sykes	Bristol City	Millwall	Free
9 July 2026	Calum Ward	Motherwell	Queens Park Rangers	Undisclosed
9 July 2026	Callum Wilson	West Ham United	Brentford	Free
10 July 2026	Ossama Ashley	Salford City	Rotherham United	Free
10 July 2026	Pierce Charles	Sheffield Wednesday	Manchester City	Undisclosed
10 July 2026	Lisav Eissat	Maccabi Haifa	Bristol City	Undisclosed
10 July 2026	Shamal George	Wycombe Wanderers	Bromley	Free
10 July 2026	Isaac Hayden	Queens Park Rangers	Leyton Orient	Free
10 July 2026	Chanse Headman	Harrogate Town	Bromley	Undisclosed
10 July 2026	Jamie Jellis	Walsall	Rotherham United	Free
10 July 2026	Kyle Joseph	Hull City	Middlesbrough	Undisclosed
10 July 2026	Jacob Mendy	Peterborough United	Bromley	Free
10 July 2026	Nik Prelec	Oxford United	Jagiellonia Białystok	Undisclosed
10 July 2026	Jed Ward	Bristol Rovers	Walsall	Undisclosed
10 July 2026	Cauley Woodrow	Luton Town	Wycombe Wanderers	Undisclosed
11 July 2026	Bradley Collins	Coventry City	Bristol City	Free
11 July 2026	Tom Lockyer	Bristol Rovers	Melbourne Victory	Free
11 July 2026	Joe Lumley	Bristol City	Sheffield Wednesday	Free
11 July 2026	Jeremy Monga	Leicester City	Manchester City	£10m
11 July 2026	Rafiki Saïd	Standard Liège	Wolverhampton Wanderers	Undisclosed
11 July 2026	Loum Tchaouna	Burnley	Coventry City	Undisclosed
11 July 2026	Deon Woodman	Wealdstone	Bromley	Undisclosed
12 July 2026	Lluc Castell	Espanyol	Burnley	Undisclosed
13 July 2026	Victor Adeboyejo	Mansfield Town	Bromley	Free
13 July 2026	Jack Cooper-Love	Burton Albion	Emmen	Undisclosed
13 July 2026	Ryan Delaney	Swindon Town	Oldham Athletic	Free
13 July 2026	Andrey Santos	Chelsea	Manchester United	£48m
13 July 2026	Rocco Robert Shein	Fredrikstad	Portsmouth	Undisclosed
13 July 2026	Michael Smith	Preston North End	Mansfield Town	Free
13 July 2026	Ryan Wintle	Cardiff City	Milton Keynes Dons	Free
14 July 2026	Elliot Bonds	Fleetwood Town	Salford City	Undisclosed
14 July 2026	Andy Cannon	Wrexham	Fleetwood Town	Free
14 July 2026	Murphy Cooper	Queens Park Rangers	Plymouth Argyle	Undisclosed
14 July 2026	Karl Darlow	Leeds United	Manchester United	Free
14 July 2026	Tyrese Noslin	Telstar	Barnsley	Undisclosed
14 July 2026	Álvaro Rodríguez	Elche	Bournemouth	£25.7m
14 July 2026	Eseosa Sule	West Bromwich Albion	St Mirren	Undisclosed
14 July 2026	Charlie Taylor	Southampton	Derby County	Free
14 July 2026	Youri Tielemans	Aston Villa	Manchester United	£35m
14 July 2026	James Tilley	Wycombe Wanderers	AFC Wimbledon	Undisclosed
14 July 2026	Luka Vušković	Tottenham Hotspur	Brighton & Hove Albion	£46m
15 July 2026	Elkan Baggott	Ipswich Town	Millwall	Undisclosed
15 July 2026	Lewis Dobbin	Aston Villa	Southampton	£9m
15 July 2026	Thomas Meunier	Lille	Sunderland	Free
15 July 2026	Amani Richards	Leicester City	Barnsley	Undisclosed
15 July 2026	Silko Thomas	Leicester City	Wycombe Wanderers	Free
15 July 2026	Leandro Trossard	Arsenal	Beşiktaş	£15.3m
15 July 2026	Harry Winks	Leicester City	Cagliari	Undisclosed
16 July 2026	Aurèle Amenda	Eintracht Frankfurt	Coventry City	£17m
16 July 2026	Conor Chaplin	Ipswich Town	Leicester City	Free
16 July 2026	Diego Coppola	Brighton & Hove Albion	Paris FC	Undisclosed
16 July 2026	Christ Makosso	Luton Town	Auxerre	Undisclosed
16 July 2026	Alex McCarthy	Southampton	Leicester City	Free
16 July 2026	Yeimar Mosquera	Aston Villa	Vitória de Guimarães	Undisclosed
16 July 2026	Timothée Pembélé	Sunderland	Le Havre	Undisclosed
16 July 2026	Isaac Schmidt	Leeds United	Young Boys	Undisclosed
16 July 2026	Omar Haktab Traoré	Udinese	Watford	Undisclosed
16 July 2026	David Tutonda	Rochdale	Accrington Stanley	Free
16 July 2026	Max Watters	Barnsley	Port Vale	Free
16 July 2026	Joe White	Newcastle United	Crewe Alexandra	Free
16 July 2026	Harry Wood	Shelbourne	Stockport County	Undisclosed
17 July 2026	Danny Anisjko	Nottingham Forest	Chesterfield	Free
17 July 2026	Christopher Atherton	Chelsea	Ipswich Town	Undisclosed
17 July 2026	Matt Baker	Newport County	Notts County	Undisclosed
17 July 2026	Žan Celar	Queens Park Rangers	Basel	Undisclosed
17 July 2026	Maxime Estève	Burnley	RB Leipzig	£27.3m
17 July 2026	Reigan Heskey	Manchester City	1. FC Köln	£8m
17 July 2026	Jack Hunt	Wigan Athletic	York City	Free
17 July 2026	Remeao Hutton	Gillingham	Chesterfield	Free
17 July 2026	Johan Manzambi	SC Freiburg	Aston Villa	£52m
17 July 2026	Shaun McWilliams	Rotherham United	Cheltenham Town	Free
17 July 2026	Tarik Muharemović	Sassuolo	Leeds United	£34.1m
17 July 2026	Taylor Perry	Shrewsbury Town	Exeter City	Free
17 July 2026	Kerr Smith	Aston Villa	Inverness Caledonian Thistle	Free
17 July 2026	Tai Sodje	Buxton	Walsall	Undisclosed
17 July 2026	Kai Wagner	Birmingham City	Philadelphia Union	Undisclosed
18 July 2026	Gbemi Arubi	Dundalk	Burton Albion	Undisclosed
18 July 2026	Wyll Stanway	Barrow	Cheltenham Town	Undisclosed
19 July 2026	Karlan Grant	West Bromwich Albion	Charlton Athletic	Free
19 July 2026	Billy Mitchell	Millwall	Sheffield Wednesday	Free
20 July 2026	Matt Doherty	Wolverhampton Wanderers	Sheffield United	Free
20 July 2026	João Gomes	Wolverhampton Wanderers	Aston Villa	£38m
20 July 2026	Isaac Hutchinson	Bristol Rovers	Doncaster Rovers	Undisclosed
20 July 2026	Tynan Thompson	Tottenham Hotspur	Manchester United	£8m
20 July 2026	Lorent Tolaj	Plymouth Argyle	Bristol City	Undisclosed
21 July 2026	Karoy Anderson	Charlton Athletic	Blackpool	Undisclosed
21 July 2026	Jordan Davies	Fleetwood Town	Tranmere Rovers	Free
21 July 2026	Abdul Fatawu	Leicester City	Ipswich Town	£20m
21 July 2026	Kyōgo Furuhashi	Birmingham City	LA Galaxy	Undisclosed
21 July 2026	Tariq Lamptey	Fiorentina	Queens Park Rangers	Free
21 July 2026	Ryan Leak	Unattached	Walsall	Free
21 July 2026	Joseph Olowu	Stockport County	Leyton Orient	Undisclosed
21 July 2026	Morgan Rogers	Aston Villa	Chelsea	£117m
21 July 2026	Derensili Sanches Fernandes	Excelsior	Huddersfield Town	Undisclosed
21 July 2026	Ryan Trevitt	Brentford	Wigan Athletic	Free
21 July 2026	Kayne van Oevelen	Volendam	Ipswich Town	Undisclosed
21 July 2026	Matty Warhurst	Manchester City	Northampton Town	Undisclosed
21 July 2026	Óscar Zambrano	Maribor	Hull City	Undisclosed
22 July 2026	Filip Bilbija	SC Paderborn	Derby County	Free
22 July 2026	Casemiro	Manchester United	Inter Miami	Free
22 July 2026	Tom Dele-Bashiru	Watford	Aris Thessaloniki	Undisclosed
22 July 2026	Issa Diop	Fulham	Ipswich Town	Undisclosed
22 July 2026	Elijah Just	Motherwell	Swansea City	Undisclosed
22 July 2026	Will Lankshear	Tottenham Hotspur	Middlesbrough	£10m
22 July 2026	Connor Lemonheigh-Evans	Milton Keynes Dons	Northampton Town	Free
23 July 2026	Elliot Anderson	Nottingham Forest	Manchester City	£116m
23 July 2026	Harrison Bettoni	Wigan Athletic	Chelsea	Undisclosed
23 July 2026	Gaizka Larrazabal	Casa Pia	Bolton Wanderers	Free
23 July 2026	Danny McNamara	Millwall	Charlton Athletic	Free
23 July 2026	Marko Milovanović	Almería	Portsmouth	£3m
23 July 2026	Alex Mitchell	Charlton Athletic	Plymouth Argyle	Undisclosed
23 July 2026	Xaver Schlager	RB Leipzig	Nottingham Forest	Free
23 July 2026	Matt Targett	Newcastle United	Hull City	Free
23 July 2026	Christos Tzolis	Club Brugge	Arsenal	£34m
24 July 2026	Aladji Bamba	Monaco	Newcastle United	£34m
24 July 2026	Daniel Bielica	NAC Breda	Portsmouth	Undisclosed
24 July 2026	Iker Bravo	Udinese	Watford	Undisclosed
24 July 2026	Malcolm Ebiowei	Unattached	Crawley Town	Free
24 July 2026	Jack Evans	Harrogate Town	Notts County	Undisclosed
24 July 2026	Luca Kjerrumgaard	Udinese	Watford	Undisclosed
24 July 2026	Klaudio Krasniqi	Glacis United	Crawley Town	Free
24 July 2026	Nigel Lonwijk	Wolverhampton Wanderers	Maccabi Haifa	Undisclosed
24 July 2026	Hidemasa Morita	Sporting CP	Hull City	Free
24 July 2026	Sam Nombe	Rotherham United	Milton Keynes Dons	Undisclosed
24 July 2026	Crysencio Summerville	West Ham United	Al-Hilal	£55m
24 July 2026	Conor Townsend	Ipswich Town	West Bromwich Albion	Free
24 July 2026	Sam Waller	Harrogate Town	Rochdale	Free
25 July 2026	Andrei Coubiș	Universitatea Cluj	Lincoln City	Undisclosed
25 July 2026	Jackson Izquierdo	Crystal Palace	Crawley Town	Free
25 July 2026	Daizen Maeda	Celtic	Ipswich Town	£10m
25 July 2026	Terence Vancooten	Burton Albion	Stevenage	Undisclosed
26 July 2026	Millenic Alli	Luton Town	Charlton Athletic	Undisclosed
26 July 2026	Jack Harrison	Leeds United	New England Revolution	Undisclosed
26 July 2026	Kyrell Lisbie	Peterborough United	Millwall	Undisclosed
27 July 2026	Fraser Bryden	Crusaders	Chesterfield	Undisclosed
27 July 2026	Kaheim Dixon	Charlton Athletic	Novi Pazar	Undisclosed
27 July 2026	Tom Ince	Watford	Tranmere Rovers	Free
27 July 2026	Jack McEvilly	Burnley	Tranmere Rovers	Free
27 July 2026	JJ McKiernan	Lincoln City	Bromley	Undisclosed
27 July 2026	Ben Osborn	Derby County	Stockport County	Free
27 July 2026	Olly Scott	Aldershot Town	Tranmere Rovers	Free
27 July 2026	Sam Sherring	Milton Keynes Dons	Rochdale	Free
27 July 2026	Luka Smyth	VPS	Notts County	Undisclosed
27 July 2026	Charlie Veevers	Burnley	Tranmere Rovers	Free
28 July 2026	Jake Batty	Swindon Town	Fleetwood Town	Free
28 July 2026	Luke Brooke-Smith	Wellington Phoenix	Portsmouth	Undisclosed
28 July 2026	Cian Doyle	Bray Wanderers	Grimsby Town	Undisclosed
28 July 2026	Nolan Galves	Rodez	West Bromwich Albion	Undisclosed
28 July 2026	Harrison Male	York City	Tranmere Rovers	Free
28 July 2026	Noah Mawene	Preston North End	Fleetwood Town	Free
28 July 2026	Luke Molyneux	Doncaster Rover	Salford City	Undisclosed
28 July 2026	Omari Mrisho	Huddersfield Town	Crawley Town	Free
28 July 2026	James Pradic	Preston North End	Fleetwood Town	Free
28 July 2026	Ugo Raghouber	Lille	Burnley	Undisclosed
28 July 2026	Kjell Scherpen	Union Saint-Gilloise	Ipswich Town	Undisclosed
28 July 2026	Zain Silcott-Duberry	Sheffield Wednesday	Rochdale	Free
28 July 2026	Reece Smith	Harrogate Town	Walsall	Undisclosed
28 July 2026	Jordan Thomas	Cheltenham Town	Doncaster Rovers	Free
28 July 2026	Luis Vázquez	Anderlecht	Birmingham City	Undisclosed
29 July 2026	Sebastian Berhalter	Vancouver Whitecaps	Middlesbrough	Undisclosed
29 July 2026	Kelvin Ehibhatiomhan	Reading	AC Horsens	Undisclosed
29 July 2026	Nick Freeman	Shrewsbury Town	Gillingham	Free
29 July 2026	Danny Imray	Crystal Palace	Wrexham	Undisclosed
29 July 2026	Alassana Jatta	Notts County	Casa Pia	Undisclosed
29 July 2026	Luca Koleosho	Burnley	Paris FC	Undisclosed
29 July 2026	Paul Mullin	Wrexham	Rotherham United	Free
29 July 2026	Samuel Tabares	Southampton	Gillingham	Free
30 July 2026	Courtney Baker-Richardson	Newport County	Tranmere Rovers	Free
30 July 2026	Tyler Fredricson	Manchester United	Lausanne-Sport	Undisclosed
30 July 2026	Maxence Lacroix	Crystal Palace	Chelsea	£52m
30 July 2026	Kristoffer Lund	Palermo	Birmingham City	Undisclosed
30 July 2026	Callum Marshall	West Ham United	Luton Town	Undisclosed
30 July 2026	John Stones	Manchester City	Inter Milan	Free
30 July 2026	Connal Trueman	Milton Keynes Dons	Sheffield Wednesday	Free
31 July 2026	Luca Ashby-Hammond	Plymouth Argyle	Stockport County	Free
31 July 2026	Liam Cullen	Swansea City	Leicester City	Undisclosed
31 July 2026	Sam Gale	Gillingham	Barnsley	Undisclosed
31 July 2026	Ashley Maynard-Brewer	Dundee United	Sheffield Wednesday	Free
31 July 2026	Aaron McGowan	Tranmere Rovers	Port Vale	Free
31 July 2026	Lewis Montsma	Dundee	Port Vale	Free
31 July 2026	Martín Payero	Udinese	Watford	Undisclosed
31 July 2026	Federico Ravaglia	Bologna	Watford	Undisclosed
31 July 2026	Samuel Silvera	Middlesbrough	Milton Keynes Dons	Free
1 August 2026	Mamadou Sangaré	Lens	Brentford	Undisclosed
1 August 2026	António Silva	Benfica	Bournemouth	£25.7m
1 August 2026	Danny Welbeck	Brighton & Hove Albion	Chelsea	£5m
2 August 2026	Tariq Al-Sadi	Unattached	Leyton Orient	Free
2 August 2026	Valentín Barco	Strasbourg	Chelsea	£34m
2 August 2026	Danny Batth	Derby County	Millwall	Free
3 August 2026	Harry Boyes	Southend United	York City	Undisclosed
3 August 2026	Gonzalo García	Real Madrid	Fulham	£34m
3 August 2026	Jordan Henderson	Brentford	Chelsea	Free
3 August 2026	Lukáš Horníček	Braga	Newcastle United	£25.7m
3 August 2026	Conor McManus	Brentford	Gillingham	Undisclosed
3 August 2026	César Palacios	Real Madrid	Fulham	Undisclosed
3 August 2026	Will Vaulks	Oxford United	Tranmere Rovers	Undisclosed
4 August 2026	Ahmed Abdullahi	Sunderland	Eyüpspor	Undisclosed
4 August 2026	Max Arfsten	Columbus Crew	Middlesbrough	Undisclosed
4 August 2026	Dom Ballard	Leyton Orient	Bristol City	Undisclosed
4 August 2026	Thomas Hill	Harrogate Town	Oldham Athletic	Free
4 August 2026	Florentino Luís	Burnley	Ipswich Town	Undisclosed
4 August 2026	Kieran Ngwenya	Dunfermline Athletic	Rotherham United	Free
4 August 2026	Ewan Otoo	Dunfermline Athletic	Rotherham United	Free
4 August 2026	Freddie Potts	West Ham United	Club Brugge	Undisclosed
4 August 2026	Carl Rushworth	Brighton & Hove Albion	Coventry City	£22m
4 August 2026	Tyreece Simpson	Stevenage	Port Vale	Free
4 August 2026	Jonny Smith	Wigan Athletic	Rochdale	Undisclosed
4 August 2026	Darlin Yongwa	Lorient	Norwich City	Free
5 August 2026	Ben Amos	Port Vale	Burnley	Free
5 August 2026	Charlie Binns	Bath City	Bristol Rovers	Free
5 August 2026	Ibane Bowat	Portsmouth	Huddersfield Town	Undisclosed
5 August 2026	Tom Bradshaw	Oxford United	Rotherham United	Free
5 August 2026	Felix Horn Myhre	Brann	West Bromwich Albion	Undisclosed
5 August 2026	Mikael Mandron	St Mirren	Stockport County	Free
5 August 2026	Jack Moylan	Lincoln City	Cardiff City	Undisclosed
5 August 2026	Christian Nørgaard	Arsenal	Everton	£7m
5 August 2026	Jayden Stockley	Port Vale	AFC Wimbledon	Undisclosed
5 August 2026	Liam Thompson	Derby County	Mansfield Town	Undisclosed
5 August 2026	Konstantinos Tzolakis	Olympiacos	Hull City	£20m
5 August 2026	Reece Welch	Everton	Bradford City	Free
5 August 2026	Benjamin Whiteman	Preston North End	Wrexham	Undisclosed
6 August 2026	Daniel Barden	Norwich City	Stevenage	Free
6 August 2026	Wes Burns	Ipswich Town	Leicester City	Undisclosed
6 August 2026	Lyndon Dykes	Charlton Athletic	Millwall	Free
6 August 2026	Archie Harris	Bournemouth	Wigan Athletic	Undisclosed
6 August 2026	Kaelan Majekodunmi	Olympic Kingsway	Swindon Town	Free
6 August 2026	Souleyman Mandey	West Bromwich Albion	Grazer AK	Undisclosed
6 August 2026	Mohamed Salah	Liverpool	Trabzonspor	Free
6 August 2026	Ross Stewart	Southampton	Swansea City	Free
6 August 2026	James Trafford	Manchester City	Leeds United	£45m
6 August 2026	Joël Veltman	Brighton & Hove Albion	West Ham United	Free
7 August 2026	Sonny Aljofree	Manchester United	Rotherham United	Free
7 August 2026	Dean Campbell	Northampton Town	Notts County	Undisclosed
7 August 2026	Nathaniel Chalobah	Sheffield Wednesday	Charlton Athletic	Free
7 August 2026	Lee Evans	Bradford City	Northampton Town	Free
7 August 2026	Will Evans	Mansfield Town	Plymouth Argyle	Undisclosed
7 August 2026	Jens Hjertø-Dahl	Tromsø	Hull City	Undisclosed
7 August 2026	Jaze Kabia	Grimsby Town	Leyton Orient	Undisclosed
7 August 2026	Tyler Onyango	Everton	Sheffield Wednesday	Free
7 August 2026	Caleb Yirenkyi	Nordsjælland	Coventry City	£23.1m
8 August 2026	Bruno Guimarães	Newcastle United	Arsenal	£75m
8 August 2026	Saša Lukić	Fulham	Ipswich Town	Undisclosed
8 August 2026	Radek Vítek	Manchester United	Middlesbrough	Undisclosed
9 August 2026	Trevoh Chalobah	Chelsea	Como	£25.7m
9 August 2026	Lucas Digne	Aston Villa	Paris Saint-Germain	£8.5m
9 August 2026	Elliot Stroud	Mjällby AIF	Hull City	Undisclosed
10 August 2026	Abu Kamara	Hull City	Portsmouth	Undisclosed
10 August 2026	Franco Ravizzoli	Blackpool	Leicester City	Free
10 August 2026	Manor Solomon	Tottenham Hotspur	West Ham United	£5m
10 August 2026	Anthony Patterson	Sunderland	Wrexham	Undisclosed
11 August 2026	Admir Bristrić	Olimpija Ljubljana	Leicester City	Undisclosed
11 August 2026	Shea Charles	Southampton	Fulham	£26m
11 August 2026	Ousmane Diomande	Sporting CP	Nottingham Forest	£34m
11 August 2026	Roman Dixon	Everton	Walsall	Free
11 August 2026	Brennan Johnson	Crystal Palace	Everton	Undisclosed
11 August 2026	Gustavo Hamer	Sheffield United	Coventry City	Undisclosed
11 August 2026	Dwight McNeil	Everton	Crystal Palace	Undisclosed
11 August 2026	Rabby Nzingoula	Strasbourg	West Bromwich Albion	Undisclosed
11 August 2026	Luke Southwood	Bristol Rovers	Blackpool	Undisclosed
11 August 2026	Tom Wilson-Brown	Leicester City	Stockport County	Undisclosed
12 August 2026	Gabriel Breeze	Carlisle United	Cambridge United	Undisclosed
12 August 2026	Lewis Brunt	Wrexham	Bolton Wanderers	Undisclosed
12 August 2026	Pep Chavarría	Rayo Vallecano	Chelsea	£16.3m
12 August 2026	Dennis Cirkin	Sunderland	Queens Park Rangers	Free
12 August 2026	Lucas Herrington	Colorado Rapids	Hull City	Undisclosed
12 August 2026	Nobel Mendy	Rayo Vallecano	Hull City	Undisclosed
12 August 2026	Gerónimo Rulli	Marseille	Manchester City	£1.7m
12 August 2026	Sam Walker	Bradford City	Watford	Undisclosed
13 August 2026	Archie Collins	Peterborough United	Huddersfield Town	Free
13 August 2026	Cameron Dawson	Rotherham United	Bradford City	Free
13 August 2026	Liam Kelly	Milton Keynes Dons	Peterborough United	Undisclosed
13 August 2026	Vernon Masara	Burnley	Peterborough United	Undisclosed
13 August 2026	Enes Ünal	Bournemouth	Getafe	Free
13 August 2026	Ethan Williams	Manchester United	Peterborough United	Undisclosed
14 August 2026	Baba Adeeko	Wigan Athletic	Rochdale	Undisclosed
14 August 2026	Max Bird	Bristol City	Birmingham City	Undisclosed
14 August 2026	Finley Burns	Manchester City	Wigan Athletic	Free
14 August 2026	Enis Destan	Hull City	Konyaspor	Undisclosed
14 August 2026	Léo Leroy	Basel	Preston North End	Undisclosed
14 August 2026	Owen Mason	Mansfield Town	Bromley	Undisclosed
14 August 2026	Alex Mowatt	West Bromwich Albion	Derby County	Undisclosed
14 August 2026	Jeremy Petris	Watford	Aris Thessaloniki	Undisclosed
14 August 2026	Felipe Rodríguez-Gentile	Preston North End	Portland Hearts of Pine	Free
14 August 2026	Dastan Satpayev	Kairat	Chelsea	£3.4m
14 August 2026	Andreas Weimann	Derby County	Cheltenham Town	Free
15 August 2026	Arne Engels	Celtic	West Ham United	£22m
15 August 2026	Joe Gelhardt	Leeds United	Hull City	Undisclosed
15 August 2026	Lucas Gourna-Douath	Red Bull Salzburg	Hull City	Undisclosed
15 August 2026	Anan Khalaili	Union Saint-Gilloise	Crystal Palace	£21m
15 August 2026	Nestory Irankunda	Watford	Sporting CP	Undisclosed
15 August 2026	Ashley Phillips	Tottenham Hotspur	Middlesbrough	Undisclosed
15 August 2026	Cristian Romero	Tottenham Hotspur	Atlético Madrid	£34.2m
15 August 2026	Djed Spence	Tottenham Hotspur	Inter Milan	£25.6m
16 August 2026	Tatsuki Seko	Stoke City	Urawa Red Diamonds	Undisclosed
17 August 2026	Taiwo Awoniyi	Nottingham Forest	Coventry City	£9m
17 August 2026	Julio Enciso	Strasbourg	Ipswich Town	Undisclosed
17 August 2026	Joe O'Brien-Whitmarsh	Southampton	Northampton Town	Undisclosed
17 August 2026	Abdoul Ouattara	Strasbourg	Ipswich Town	Undisclosed
17 August 2026	Andy Yiadom	Reading	AFC Wimbledon	Free
18 August 2026	Tobias Brenan	Wigan Athletic	Bromley	Undisclosed
18 August 2026	Amar Dedić	Benfica	Newcastle United	£30m
18 August 2026	Maël de Gevigney	Barnsley	Silkeborg	Undisclosed
18 August 2026	Ethan Ennis	Manchester United	Stockport County	Undisclosed
18 August 2026	Zavier Gozo	Real Salt Lake	Crystal Palace	£11.1m
18 August 2026	Michael Mellon	Burnley	Stevenage	Undisclosed
18 August 2026	Rodri	Manchester City	Barcelona	£65m
18 August 2026	Tom Wooster	West Ham United	Walsall	Free
19 August 2026	Harvey Araujo	Fulham	Burton Albion	Undisclosed
19 August 2026	Sidiki Cherif	Fenerbahçe	Coventry City	Undisclosed
19 August 2026	Grégoire Coudert	Brest	Burnley	Undisclosed
19 August 2026	George Earthy	West Ham United	Reading	Undisclosed
19 August 2026	Nico Elvedi	Borussia Mönchengladbach	Leeds United	£8.5m
19 August 2026	Alfie Osbourne	Heart of Midlothian	Chelsea	Free
19 August 2026	Seb Palmer-Houlden	Gillingham	Motherwell	Undisclosed
19 August 2026	Tijjani Reijnders	Manchester City	Al-Qadsiah	£52m
19 August 2026	Matteo Ruggeri	Atlético Madrid	Aston Villa	£17m
19 August 2026	Zion Suzuki	Parma	Aston Villa	£30m
20 August 2026	Anel Ahmedhodžić	Feyenoord	Burnley	Undisclosed
20 August 2026	Ryan Hedges	Blackburn Rovers	Derby County	Free
20 August 2026	George Hirst	Ipswich Town	Stoke City	Undisclosed
21 August 2026	Dan Bentley	Wolverhampton Wanderers	Coventry City	Undisclosed
21 August 2026	Curtis Jones	Liverpool	Inter Milan	£30m
21 August 2026	Ezri Konsa	Aston Villa	Arsenal	£51m
21 August 2026	Nathan Opoku	Leicester City	Northampton Town	Undisclosed
21 August 2026	Jordi Osei-Tutu	Bolton Wanderers	Millwall	Free
21 August 2026	Brendan Wiredu	Plymouth Argyle	Salford City	Undisclosed
21 August 2026	Jake Turner	Gillingham	Newport County	Free
24 August 2026	Jules Ahoka	Antwerp	Sunderland	£8.6m
24 August 2026	Sam Byram	Leeds United	Middlesbrough	Free
24 August 2026	Sonny Finch	South Shields	Grimsby Town	Undisclosed
24 August 2026	James Furlong	Maribor	Walsall	Free
24 August 2026	Reece James	Rotherham United	Sheffield Wednesday	Free
25 August 2026	Elijah Adebayo	Luton Town	Bristol City	Free
25 August 2026	Carlos Baleba	Brighton & Hove Albion	Manchester United	£65m
25 August 2026	Jeremiah Berkeley-Agyepong	Chelsea	Reading	Undisclosed
25 August 2026	Harry Cornick	Bristol City	AFC Wimbledon	Free
25 August 2026	Jaouen Hadjam	Young Boys	Brighton & Hove Albion	Undisclosed
25 August 2026	Ki-Jana Hoever	Wolverhampton Wanderers	Sparta Prague	Undisclosed
25 August 2026	Omari Kellyman	Chelsea	Strasbourg	£5.1m
25 August 2026	Kacper Łopata	Barnsley	Lechia Gdańsk	Undisclosed
25 August 2026	Conor Masterson	Gillingham	Reading	Free
25 August 2026	Tom Myles	Rochdale	Salford City	Free
25 August 2026	Milutin Osmajić	Preston North End	Genoa	Undisclosed
25 August 2026	Sávio	Manchester City	Tottenham Hotspur	£75m
26 August 2026	Krystian Bielik	West Bromwich Albion	Cardiff City	Undisclosed
26 August 2026	Ayyoub Bouaddi	Lille	Manchester City	£81.4m
26 August 2026	Will Dennis	Bournemouth	Milton Keynes Dons	Undisclosed
26 August 2026	Josh Earl	Barnsley	Blackpool	Undisclosed
26 August 2026	Nico González	Manchester City	Newcastle United	£52m
26 August 2026	Ilari Kangasniemi	Inter Turku	Leicester City	Undisclosed
26 August 2026	Jayden Nelson	Austin FC	Bolton Wanderers	£1.64m
26 August 2026	Danny Ormerod	AFC Fylde	Peterborough United	£600,000
26 August 2026	Ethan Pinnock	Brentford	Coventry City	£6m
27 August 2026	Josh Austerfield	Salford City	Rotherham United	Undisclosed
27 August 2026	Mohamed-Ali Cho	Nice	Hull City	Undisclosed
27 August 2026	Liam Delap	Chelsea	Nottingham Forest	£45m
27 August 2026	Stephen Eustáquio	Porto	Swansea City	£3.4m
27 August 2026	Leon Goretzka	Bayern Munich	Aston Villa	Free
27 August 2026	Cathal Heffernan	Harrogate Town	Cambridge United	Undisclosed
27 August 2026	Issa Kaboré	Manchester City	Wrexham	Undisclosed
27 August 2026	Stanley Mills	Oxford United	Preston North End	Undisclosed
27 August 2026	Iyad Mohamed	Casa Pia	Portsmouth	Undisclosed
27 August 2026	Exequiel Palacios	Bayer Leverkusen	Ipswich Town	Undisclosed
27 August 2026	John Ruddy	Newcastle United	Wolverhampton Wanderers	Free
27 August 2026	George Saville	Luton Town	Bromley	Undisclosed
27 August 2026	Keven Schlotterbeck	FC Augsburg	Southampton	Undisclosed
27 August 2026	Kareem Tunde	Levante	West Bromwich Albion	Undisclosed
27 August 2026	João Virgínia	Sporting CP	Wolverhampton Wanderers	Undisclosed
28 August 2026	Gavin Bazunu	Southampton	Bolton Wanderers	Undisclosed
28 August 2026	El Hadji Malick Diouf	West Ham United	Brentford	£35m
28 August 2026	Atsuki Itō	Gent	Bolton Wanderers	Undisclosed
28 August 2026	Nicolas Jackson	Chelsea	Aston Villa	£47.5m
28 August 2026	Mamadou Jobe	Cambridge United	Stockport County	Undisclosed
28 August 2026	Imrân Louza	Watford	Panathinaikos	£7m
28 August 2026	Dylan Morgan	Torquay United	Crawley Town	Undisclosed
28 August 2026	Jack Thomson	Kilmarnock	Swindon Town	Undisclosed
28 August 2026	James Ward-Prowse	West Ham United	Southampton	£1m
29 August 2026	Coniah Boyce-Clarke	Aldershot Town	Tranmere Rovers	Free
29 August 2026	Michael Zetterer	Eintracht Frankfurt	Leeds United	Undisclosed
30 August 2026	Toby Collyer	Manchester United	West Bromwich Albion	Undisclosed
30 August 2026	Saša Kalajdžić	Wolverhampton Wanderers	LASK	Undisclosed
30 August 2026	Abdoulaye Kanté	Middlesbrough	Al-Ettifaq	Undisclosed
30 August 2026	Mikkel Ladefoged	Västerås SK	Lincoln City	Undisclosed
30 August 2026	Joe Lewis	AFC Wimbledon	Burton Albion	Free
30 August 2026	Emiliano Martínez	Aston Villa	Chelsea	£7.5m
30 August 2026	Matías Orozco	Deportivo Cali	Brighton & Hove Albion	£3.5m
30 August 2026	Ben Hamed Touré	Annecy	Barnsley	Undisclosed
30 August 2026	Ollie Watkins	Aston Villa	Al-Hilal	£51m
31 August 2026	Allan	Palmeiras	Manchester City	£32m
31 August 2026	Edvin Austbø	Viking	West Ham United	Undisclosed
31 August 2026	Stefan Bajcetic	Liverpool	Celta Vigo	Undisclosed
31 August 2026	Bradley Barcola	Paris Saint-Germain	Liverpool	£106m
31 August 2026	David Datro Fofana	Chelsea	Servette	£2.5m
31 August 2026	Daniel Muñoz	Crystal Palace	Nottingham Forest	£22m
31 August 2026	Rokas Pukštas	Hajduk Split	Middlesbrough	£4.3m
31 August 2026	Jayden Wareham	Exeter City	Wycombe Wanderers	Undisclosed
1 September 2026	Tosin Adarabioyo	Chelsea	Tottenham Hotspur	£10m
1 September 2026	David Affengruber	Elche	Fulham	Undisclosed
1 September 2026	Chema Andrés	VfB Stuttgart	Brighton & Hove Albion	£15.5m
1 September 2026	Manuel Ángel	Real Madrid	Fulham	Undisclosed
1 September 2026	Juan Riquelme Angulo	Independiente del Valle	Sunderland	Undisclosed
1 September 2026	Ilyas Ansah	Union Berlin	Hull City	£12.8m
1 September 2026	Femi Azeez	Millwall	Brighton & Hove Albion	£12.5m
1 September 2026	Beto	Everton	Fiorentina	£14.6m
1 September 2026	Myron Boadu	PSV Eindhoven	Watford	Free
1 September 2026	Luca Bombino	San Diego FC	Stoke City	Undisclosed
1 September 2026	Lucca Brughmans	Genk	Liverpool	£30m
1 September 2026	Ben Chilwell	Strasbourg	Crystal Palace	Undisclosed
1 September 2026	Cody Drameh	Hull City	Genoa	£3.4m
1 September 2026	Enzo Fernández	Chelsea	Manchester City	£125m
1 September 2026	Matias Fernandez-Pardo	Lille	Newcastle United	£51.4m
1 September 2026	Zian Flemming	Burnley	Ipswich Town	£20m
1 September 2026	Malick Fofana	Lyon	Sunderland	£30m
1 September 2026	Marc Guiu	Chelsea	RB Leipzig	£14.6m
1 September 2026	Antwoine Hackford	AFC Wimbledon	Swindon Town	Undisclosed
1 September 2026	Igor Julio	Brighton & Hove Albion	Burnley	Undisclosed
1 September 2026	Taylor Harwood-Bellis	Southampton	Aston Villa	£25m
1 September 2026	Tim Iroegbunam	Everton	Hull City	£13m
1 September 2026	Gabriel Jesus	Arsenal	Barcelona	£8.6m
1 September 2026	Jodi Jones	Notts County	Bromley	Undisclosed
1 September 2026	Eli King	Cardiff City	Gillingham	Undisclosed
1 September 2026	Kylian Kouassi	Blackpool	Colchester United	Undisclosed
1 September 2026	Dylan Levitt	Leyton Orient	Motherwell	Undisclosed
1 September 2026	Rosaire Longelo	Salford City	Notts County	Undisclosed
1 September 2026	Ainsley Maitland-Niles	Lyon	Everton	Undisclosed
1 September 2026	Filip Marschall	Stevenage	Millwall	Undisclosed
1 September 2026	Ibrahim Mbaye	Paris Saint-Germain	Aston Villa	£47m
1 September 2026	Jack McGlynn	Houston Dynamo	Stoke City	Undisclosed
1 September 2026	Glenn Middleton	Doncaster Rovers	Rochdale	Undisclosed
1 September 2026	Christos Mouzakitis	Olympiacos	Hull City	£13m
1 September 2026	Iliman Ndiaye	Everton	Manchester City	£60m
1 September 2026	Junior Nkeng	AFC Wimbledon	Charlton Athletic	Undisclosed
1 September 2026	Brooke Norton-Cuffy	Genoa	Hull City	£12m
1 September 2026	Callum O'Hare	Sheffield United	Wrexham	£6.5m
1 September 2026	Corey O'Keeffe	Barnsley	Bradford City	Undisclosed
1 September 2026	Daniel Oyegoke	Hellas Verona	Lincoln City	Undisclosed
1 September 2026	David Ozoh	Crystal Palace	Derby County	Undisclosed
1 September 2026	Nathan Patterson	Everton	Torino	Undisclosed
1 September 2026	Brayann Pereira	NEC	West Bromwich Albion	£1m
1 September 2026	Emil Riis	Bristol City	Leicester City	Undisclosed
1 September 2026	Dan Scarr	Wrexham	Salford City	Undisclosed
1 September 2026	Luís Semedo	Sunderland	Clermont	Undisclosed
1 September 2026	Tyrese Shade	Burton Albion	Portsmouth	Undisclosed
1 September 2026	Sorba Thomas	Leicester City	Hull City	Undisclosed
1 September 2026	Quinten Timber	Marseille	Crystal Palace	Undisclosed
1 September 2026	Axel Tuanzebe	Burnley	Auxerre	Undisclosed
1 September 2026	Caylan Vickers	Brighton & Hove Albion	Burton Albion	Undisclosed
1 September 2026	Fábio Vieira	Arsenal	Hamburger SV	£8.6m
1 September 2026	Deivid Washington	Chelsea	Strasborug	£6.86m
1 September 2026	Joe Whitworth	Crystal Palace	Wigan Athletic	Undisclosed
1 September 2026	Joe Worrall	Burnley	Wrexham	Undisclosed

== Loans ==
Start date	End date	Player	Moving from	Moving to
4 February 2026	30 June 2026	Tomas Kalinauskas	Burton Albion	Roda JC
5 February 2026	30 June 2026	Andreas Weimann	Derby County	Rapid Wien
9 February 2026	30 June 2026	Yan Valery	Sheffield Wednesday	Young Boys
20 February 2026	27 February 2026	Seny Dieng	Middlesbrough	Sheffield Wednesday
15 April 2026	22 April 2026	Jack Walton	Preston North End	Cambridge United
15 June 2026	30 June 2027	Zach Jeacock	Lincoln City	Northampton Town
17 June 2026	30 June 2027	Tommy Leigh	Bradford City	Bristol Rovers
18 June 2026	30 June 2027	Bruno Alves	Cruzeiro	Norwich City
19 June 2026	30 June 2027	Alfie May	Huddersfield Town	Doncaster Rovers
20 June 2026	30 June 2027	Milan Aleksić	Sunderland	Partizan
25 June 2026	30 June 2027	Tommy Simkin	Stoke City	Doncaster Rovers
27 June 2026	30 June 2027	Dion Charles	Huddersfield Town	Blackpool
30 June 2026	21 May 2027	Louie Moulden	Norwich City	Accrington Stanley
30 June 2026	30 June 2027	Matty Young	Sunderland	Huddersfield Town
1 July 2026	30 June 2027	Gassan Ahadme	Charlton Athletic	Cambridge United
1 July 2026	30 June 2027	Oliver Whatmuff	Manchester City	Stockport County
2 July 2026	30 June 2027	Logan Briggs	Leicester City	Northampton Town
2 July 2026	30 June 2027	James Debayo	Hull City	Swindon Town
2 July 2026	30 June 2027	Alex Matos	Sheffield United	Göztepe
3 July 2026	30 June 2027	Ollie Wright	Southampton	Gillingham
3 July 2026	30 June 2027	Andre Onana	Manchester United	Trabzonspor
3 July 2026	30 June 2027	Rayan Oyebade	West Ham United	Southend United
4 July 2026	30 June 2027	Hindolo Mustapha	Crystal Palace	Wigan Athletic
6 July 2026	30 June 2027	Zach Mitchell	Charlton Athletic	St Johnstone
6 July 2026	30 June 2027	Mason Terry	West Ham United	Port Vale
7 July 2026	31 December 2026	Josh Clarke	Partick Thistle	Doncaster Rovers
7 July 2026	30 June 2027	Kyliane Dong	FC Augsburg	Bolton Wanderers
7 July 2026	30 June 2027	Harry Gray	Leeds United	Sheffield Wednesday
7 July 2026	30 June 2027	Quilindschy Hartman	Burnley	Espanyol
7 July 2026	30 June 2027	Isaac Moore	Coventry City	Walsall
7 July 2026	30 June 2027	Zépiqueno Redmond	Aston Villa	Annecy
8 July 2026	30 June 2027	Romelle Donovan	Brentford	Sheffield United
8 July 2026	30 June 2027	Radu Drăgușin	Tottenham Hotspur	Fiorentina
8 July 2026	30 June 2027	Mo Faal	Wrexham	Port Vale
8 July 2026	30 June 2027	Oliver Lynch	Luton Town	Port Vale
8 July 2026	30 June 2027	Kadan Young	Aston Villa	Annecy
9 July 2026	30 June 2027	Harrison Ashby	Newcastle United	Luton Town
9 July 2026	30 June 2027	Ty Ewens-Findlay	Charlton Athletic	Crawley Town
9 July 2026	30 June 2027	Bradley Ihionvien	Peterborough United	Colchester United
9 July 2026	30 June 2027	Josh Koroma	Leyton Orient	Chesterfield
9 July 2026	30 June 2027	Joe Walsh	Queens Park Rangers	Wigan Athletic
10 July 2026	30 June 2027	Pemi Aderoju	Peterborough United	Crawley Town
10 July 2026	30 June 2027	Pierce Charles	Manchester City	Queens Park Rangers
10 July 2026	30 June 2027	Harrison Murray-Campbell	Chelsea	Kortrijk
10 July 2026	30 June 2027	Josh Stokes	Bristol City	Reading
11 July 2026	30 June 2027	Yusuf Akhamrich	Tottenham Hotspur	Leyton Orient
11 July 2026	30 June 2027	Ethon Archer	Luton Town	Bromley
11 July 2026	30 June 2027	Antonio Cordero	Newcastle United	Cádiz
11 July 2026	30 June 2027	Jesse Derry	Chelsea	Sporting CP
11 July 2026	30 June 2027	Sverre Nypan	Manchester City	Lommel
11 July 2026	30 June 2027	Ole Romeny	Oxford United	Fortuna Sittard
13 July 2026	30 June 2027	Jusef Erabi	Genk	Preston North End
13 July 2026	30 June 2027	Joe Gbodé	Luton Town	Shrewsbury Town
13 July 2026	30 June 2027	Brajan Gruda	Brighton & Hove Albion	RB Leipzig
13 July 2026	30 June 2027	Ben Krauhaus	Brentford	Falkirk
13 July 2026	30 June 2027	Victor Kristiansen	Leicester City	Panathinaikos
13 July 2026	30 June 2027	Alex Paulsen	Bournemouth	Motherwell
13 July 2026	30 June 2027	Cieran Slicker	Ipswich Town	Barnsley
14 July 2026	30 June 2027	Nathan Lowe	Stoke City	Hibernian
15 July 2026	30 June 2027	Corey Addai	Stockport County	Burton Albion
15 July 2026	30 June 2027	Lesley Ugochukwu	Burnley	Galatasaray
15 July 2026	30 June 2027	Oliwier Zych	Aston Villa	Vitória de Guimarães
16 July 2026	30 June 2027	Bobby Faulkner	Doncaster Rovers	Tranmere Rovers
16 July 2026	30 June 2027	Andrés García	Aston Villa	Getafe
16 July 2026	30 June 2027	Álex Jiménez	Bournemouth	Fiorentina
16 July 2026	30 June 2027	Makenzie Kirk	Portsmouth	Barnsley
16 July 2026	30 June 2027	Vivaldo Semedo	Watford	Alverca
17 July 2026	30 June 2027	James Beadle	Brighton & Hove Albion	Birmingham City
17 July 2026	30 June 2027	Sam Proctor	Aston Villa	Shrewsbury Town
17 July 2026	30 June 2027	Nils Ramming	Brighton & Hove Albion	Rochdale
17 July 2026	30 June 2027	Kaiden Wilson	Chelsea	Rochdale
20 July 2026	30 June 2027	Alfie McNally	Fulham	York City
21 July 2026	30 June 2027	Spike Brits	Manchester City	Sutton United
21 July 2026	30 June 2027	Oisin Gallagher	Lincoln City	Barnet
21 July 2026	30 June 2027	True Grant	Stoke City	FC Halifax Town
21 July 2026	30 June 2027	Zane Okoro	Lincoln City	Tranmere Rovers
21 July 2026	30 June 2027	Callum Perry	Coventry City	Cambridge United
21 July 2026	30 June 2027	Declan Skura	Wycombe Wanderers	Walsall
22 July 2026	30 June 2027	Norman Bassette	Coventry City	Westerlo
22 July 2026	30 June 2027	Jorge Cabezas Hurtado	Watford	Tolima
23 July 2026	30 June 2027	Alejandro Garnacho	Chelsea	Aston Villa
23 July 2026	30 June 2027	Ármin Pécsi	Liverpool	TSV Hartberg
23 July 2026	30 June 2027	Emre Tezgel	Stoke City	Wycombe Wanderers
25 July 2026	30 June 2027	Matthew Cox	Brentford	Barnet
25 July 2026	30 June 2027	Aodhan Doherty	Blackburn Rovers	Falkirk
25 July 2026	30 June 2027	Owen Goodman	Crystal Palace	Dundee
25 July 2026	30 June 2027	Alex Lowry	Wycombe Wanderers	Motherwell
25 July 2026	30 June 2027	Max Merrick	Chelsea	Hartlepool United
25 July 2026	30 June 2027	Richard Taylor	Bolton Wanderers	Bromley
27 July 2026	30 June 2027	Zain Tahir	Sheffield United	Oldham Athletic
28 July 2026	30 June 2027	Somto Boniface	Ipswich Town	Leyton Orient
28 July 2026	30 June 2027	Jili Buyabu	Sheffield United	Rotherham United
28 July 2026	30 June 2027	Harvey Cartwright	Hull City	Grimsby Town
28 July 2026	30 June 2027	Joe Gauci	Aston Villa	Lincoln City
28 July 2026	30 June 2027	Elyh Harrison	Manchester United	Greenock Morton
28 July 2026	31 December 2026	Noah Mawene	Fleetwood Town	Waterford
28 July 2026	30 June 2027	Sam Parker	Swansea City	Wycombe Wanderers
29 July 2026	30 June 2027	Tolu Arokodare	Wolverhampton Wanderers	Ajax
29 July 2026	30 June 2027	Daniel Bennie	Queens Park Rangers	Dundee United
29 July 2026	30 June 2027	Christian McFarlane	Manchester City	Leicester City
29 July 2026	30 June 2027	Jordan Williams	Portsmouth	Blackpool
30 July 2026	30 June 2027	Favour Fawunmi	Stoke City	Oldham Athletic
30 July 2026	30 June 2027	Rafiq Lamptey	Millwall	Chesterfield
31 July 2026	30 June 2027	Mason Burstow	Hull City	Sheffield Wednesday
31 July 2026	30 June 2027	Leon Chiwome	Wolverhampton Wanderers	Colchester United
31 July 2026	30 June 2027	Jesse Dempsey	Waterford	Fleetwood Town
31 July 2026	30 June 2027	Ollie Harrison	Chelsea	AFC Wimbledon
31 July 2026	30 June 2027	Hudson Sands	Chelsea	Dulwich Hamlet
1 August 2026	30 June 2027	Kamarl Grant	Millwall	Bromley
1 August 2026	30 June 2027	Osman Kamara	Blackburn Rovers	Crawley Town
1 August 2026	30 June 2027	Nicholas Michalski	Blackburn Rovers	Crawley Town
1 August 2026	30 June 2027	Sammie Szmodics	Ipswich Town	Derby County
1 August 2026	30 June 2027	Nathan Tinsdale	Hull City	Crawley Town
1 August 2026	30 June 2027	Tommy Watson	Brighton & Hove Albion	Leicester City
2 August 2026	30 June 2027	Iké Ugbo	Sheffield Wednesday	Apollon Limassol
2 August 2026	30 June 2027	Jordan Zemura	Udinese	Watford
3 August 2026	30 June 2027	Genesis Antwi	Chelsea	Strasbourg
3 August 2026	30 June 2027	Ollie Cooper	Swansea City	Notts County
3 August 2026	30 June 2027	Joseph Hungbo	Wigan Athletic	Swindon Town
3 August 2026	30 June 2027	Sam Inwood	Bolton Wanderers	Swindon Town
3 August 2026	30 June 2027	Glen Kamara	Rennes	Queens Park Rangers
4 August 2026	30 June 2027	Sheldon Kendall	Millwall	Gillingham
4 August 2026	30 June 2027	Kirsten Otchere	Leicester City	Cheltenham Town
4 August 2026	30 June 2027	Kai Payne	Wigan Athletic	Oldham Athletic
5 August 2026	30 June 2027	Charlie Binns	Bristol Rovers	Malvern Town
5 August 2026	30 June 2027	Charlie Crew	Leeds United	Walsall
6 August 2026	30 June 2027	Dajaune Brown	Derby County	Rochdale
6 August 2026	30 June 2027	Thimothée Lo-Tutala	Hull City	Colchester United
7 August 2026	30 June 2027	Finley Barbrook	Ipswich Town	Falkirk
7 August 2026	30 June 2027	Altay Bayındır	Manchester United	Celta Vigo
7 August 2026	30 June 2027	Delano Burgzorg	Middlesbrough	Preston North End
7 August 2026	30 June 2027	Keenan Gough	Charlton Athletic	Bristol Rovers
7 August 2026	30 June 2027	Alfie Merritt	Bournemouth	Newport County
7 August 2026	30 June 2027	Tanto Olaofe	Charlton Athletic	Lincoln City
7 August 2026	30 June 2027	Reiss-Alexander Russell-Denny	Tottenham Hotspur	Bristol Rovers
7 August 2026	30 June 2027	Oscar Thorn	Lincoln City	Colchester United
10 August 2026	30 June 2027	Ronald Araújo	Barcelona	Liverpool
10 August 2026	30 June 2027	Jake Evans	Leicester City	Cheltenham Town
10 August 2026	30 June 2027	Finley Munroe	Middlesbrough	Blackpool
10 August 2026	30 June 2027	Timothy Ouma	Slavia Prague	Charlton Athletic
10 August 2026	30 June 2027	Nicholas Oyekunle	Southampton	Leyton Orient
10 August 2026	30 June 2027	Ethan Sutherland	Wolverhampton Wanderers	Exeter City
11 August 2026	30 June 2027	Rio Cardines	Crystal Palace	Bristol City
11 August 2026	30 June 2027	Owen Dodgson	Stockport County	Mansfield Town
11 August 2026	30 June 2027	Julian Eyestone	Brentford	Rotherham United
11 August 2026	30 June 2027	Filip Jörgensen	Chelsea	Strasbourg
11 August 2026	30 June 2027	Alfie Gilchrist	West Bromwich Albion	Leyton Orient
11 August 2026	30 June 2027	Ryan Hardie	Wrexham	Bolton Wanderers
11 August 2026	30 June 2027	Divin Mubama	Manchester City	Southampton
11 August 2026	30 June 2027	Hindolo Mustapha	Crystal Palace	Notts County
11 August 2026	30 June 2027	Kalvin Phillips	Manchester City	Sheffield United
11 August 2026	30 June 2027	Ishé Samuels-Smith	Chelsea	Notts County
12 August 2026	30 June 2027	Benjamin Arthur	Brentford	Portsmouth
12 August 2026	30 June 2027	Evann Guessand	Aston Villa	Crystal Palace
13 August 2026	30 June 2027	Harry Howell	Brighton & Hove Albion	Leicester City
13 August 2026	30 June 2027	Charlie McNeill	Sheffield Wednesday	Crewe Alexandra
13 August 2026	30 June 2027	Tylon Smith	Queens Park Rangers	New England Revolution
14 August 2026	30 June 2027	Max Alleyne	Manchester City	Burnley
14 August 2026	30 June 2027	Will Collar	Milton Keynes Dons	Burton Albion
14 August 2026	30 June 2027	Vincent Harper	Walsall	Exeter City
14 August 2026	30 June 2027	Samuel Iling-Junior	Aston Villa	Bolton Wanderers
14 August 2026	30 June 2027	Matěj Jurásek	Norwich City	Sparta Prague
14 August 2026	30 June 2027	Ryan Kavuma-McQueen	Chelsea	Portsmouth
14 August 2026	30 June 2027	Emilio Lawrence	Manchester City	Luton Town
14 August 2026	30 June 2027	Aaron Loupalo-Bi	Fulham	Fleetwood Town
14 August 2026	30 June 2027	Jaylan Pearman	Queens Park Rangers	Swindon Town
14 August 2026	30 June 2027	Ryley Reynolds	Notts County	Grimsby Town
14 August 2026	30 June 2027	Dastan Satpayev	Chelsea	Burnley
14 August 2026	30 June 2027	Milan Smit	Stoke City	Darmstadt 98
15 August 2026	30 June 2027	Calum Scanlon	Liverpool	Cardiff City
17 August 2026	30 June 2027	Kai Jennings	AFC Wimbledon	Crawley Town
17 August 2026	30 June 2027	Anthony Munda	Newcastle United	Swindon Town
18 August 2026	30 June 2027	Emeka Adiele	Utrecht	Burton Albion
18 August 2026	30 June 2027	Promise David	Union Saint-Gilloise	Brighton & Hove Albion
18 August 2026	30 June 2027	Niclas Füllkrug	West Ham United	Werder Bremen
18 August 2026	30 June 2027	Yunus Emre Konak	Brentford	Lincoln City
19 August 2026	30 June 2027	Sebastiaan Bornauw	Leeds United	Hamburger SV
19 August 2026	30 June 2027	Jordan James	Rennes	Wolverhampton Wanderers
19 August 2026	30 June 2027	Anthony Musaba	Fenerbahçe	Norwich City
19 August 2026	30 June 2027	Kosta Nedeljković	Aston Villa	Rangers
19 August 2026	30 June 2027	Joël Piroe	Leeds United	West Ham United
19 August 2026	30 June 2027	Reggie Walsh	Chelsea	Wigan Athletic
20 August 2026	30 June 2027	Ryan Barnett	Wrexham	Milton Keynes Dons
20 August 2026	30 June 2027	Charlie Gray	Manchester City	Wigan Athletic
20 August 2026	30 June 2027	Kieran Morrison	Liverpool	Sheffield Wednesday
20 August 2026	30 June 2027	Arthur Okonkwo	Wrexham	Charlton Athletic
20 August 2026	30 June 2027	Jake Reeves	AFC Wimbledon	Barnet
20 August 2026	30 June 2027	Bobby Wales	Swansea City	Dundee
21 August 2026	30 June 2027	Sontje Hansen	Middlesbrough	Gaziantep
21 August 2026	30 June 2027	Luke Harris	Fulham	Wigan Athletic
21 August 2026	30 June 2027	Ben Johnson	Ipswich Town	Stoke City
21 August 2026	30 June 2027	Divine Mukasa	Manchester City	West Ham United
21 August 2026	31 December 2026	Adam Murphy	Bristol City	Fleetwood Town
21 August 2026	30 June 2027	Moses Sesay	Southampton	Colchester United
21 August 2026	31 December 2026	Josh Stephenson	Brentford	Crewe Alexandra
21 August 2026	31 December 2026	Kane Taylor	Aston Villa	Rochdale
21 August 2026	30 June 2027	Kyle Ure	Celtic	Crewe Alexandra
21 August 2026	30 June 2027	Aaron Wan-Bissaka	West Ham United	Aston Villa
22 August 2026	30 June 2027	Benoît Badiashile	Chelsea	Napoli
22 August 2026	30 June 2027	Bradley Fink	Wycombe Wanderers	Dundee
23 August 2026	30 June 2027	Jacob Devaney	Manchester United	Hibernian
24 August 2026	30 June 2027	Tyreeq Bakinson	Leyton Orient	Plymouth Argyle
24 August 2026	30 June 2027	Philip Sanyaolu	Queens Park Rangers	Bristol Rovers
24 August 2026	30 June 2027	Ethan Wheatley	Manchester United	Lincoln City
24 August 2026	2 January 2027	Luis Brown	West Ham United	Braintree Town
25 August 2026	30 June 2027	Michele Di Gregorio	Juventus	Bournemouth
26 August 2026	30 June 2027	Ali Al-Hamadi	Ipswich Town	Sheffield Wednesday
26 August 2026	30 June 2027	Dilane Bakwa	Nottingham Forest	Lille
26 August 2026	31 December 2026	Matt Dibley-Dias	Fulham	Newport County
26 August 2026	30 June 2027	Axel Disasi	Chelsea	Crystal Palace
26 August 2026	31 December 2026	Jovan Malcolm	Stevenage	York City
26 August 2026	30 June 2027	Tommi O'Reilly	Aston Villa	Doncaster Rovers
26 August 2026	30 June 2027	Jerry Yates	Luton Town	Blackpool
27 August 2026	30 June 2027	Raees Bangura-Williams	Millwall	Cambridge United
27 August 2026	30 June 2027	Omar Marmoush	Manchester City	Tottenham Hotspur
27 August 2026	30 June 2027	Connor O'Riordan	Blackburn Rovers	Barnsley
27 August 2026	30 June 2027	George Pratt	Blackburn Rovers	Bradford City
27 August 2026	30 June 2027	Jenson Seelt	Sunderland	Swansea City
27 August 2026	30 June 2027	Lamin Sillah	Nottingham Forest	Gillingham
28 August 2026	30 June 2027	Taylor Allen	Wycombe Wanderers	Salford City
28 August 2026	31 December 2026	Kai Andrews	Coventry City	Oxford United
28 August 2026	30 June 2027	Ben Brereton Díaz	Southampton	Sheffield United
28 August 2026	30 June 2027	Michael Golding	Leicester City	Shrewsbury Town
28 August 2026	30 June 2027	Axel Henriksson	Blackburn Rovers	Randers
28 August 2026	30 June 2027	Dylan Jones	Norwich City	Tranmere Rovers
28 August 2026	30 June 2027	Josh Knight	Portsmouth	Reading
28 August 2026	30 June 2027	Owen Moxon	Stockport County	Cambridge United
28 August 2026	30 June 2027	Mamadou Sarr	Chelsea	Real Sociedad
28 August 2026	30 June 2027	Caleb Wiley	Chelsea	Preston North End
29 August 2026	30 June 2027	Jamie Donley	Tottenham Hotspur	Luton Town
29 August 2026	30 June 2027	Rory Finneran	Newcastle United	Notts County
29 August 2026	30 June 2027	Ziyad Larkeche	Queens Park Rangers	Barnsley
29 August 2026	30 June 2027	Lucas Perri	Leeds United	Torino
30 August 2026	30 June 2027	Ben Broggio	Aston Villa	Stevenage
30 August 2026	30 June 2027	Jack Daley	Middlesbrough	Gillingham
30 August 2026	30 June 2027	Henrik Meister	Pisa	Derby County
30 August 2026	30 June 2027	Stephen Mfuni	Manchester City	Coventry City
31 August 2026	30 June 2027	Adam Aznou	Everton	Málaga
31 August 2026	30 June 2027	Joel Catesby	Everton	Accrington Stanley
31 August 2026	30 June 2027	Josh Feeney	Aston Villa	Peterborough United
31 August 2026	30 June 2027	Jayce Fitzgerald	Manchester United	Rotherham United
31 August 2026	30 June 2027	Omari Hutchinson	Nottingham Forest	Milan
31 August 2026	30 June 2027	Daniel Kanu	Charlton Athletic	Notts County
31 August 2026	30 June 2027	Louie Marsh	Sheffield United	Chesterfield
31 August 2026	30 June 2027	Kian McMahon-Brown	Burnley	Shrewsbury Town
31 August 2026	30 June 2027	Kieran Morgan	Queens Park Rangers	Bradford City
31 August 2026	30 June 2027	Lino Sousa	Aston Villa	Shrewsbury Town
31 August 2026	30 June 2027	Charlie Warren	Bolton Wanderers	Accrington Stanley
1 September 2026	30 June 2027	George Abbott	Tottenham Hotspur	Mansfield Town
1 September 2026	30 June 2027	Zach Abbott	Nottingham Forest	Southampton
1 September 2026	30 June 2027	Honest Ahanor	Atalanta	Crystal Palace
1 September 2026	30 June 2027	Damola Ajayi	Tottenham Hotspur	Barnet
1 September 2026	30 June 2027	Cameron Archer	Southampton	Auxerre
1 September 2026	30 June 2027	Maleace Asamoah	Wigan Athletic	Port Vale
1 September 2026	30 June 2027	Nathan Asiimwe	Charlton Athletic	Salford City
1 September 2026	30 June 2027	Jean-Mattéo Bahoya	Eintracht Frankfurt	Leeds United
1 September 2026	30 June 2027	Theo Bair	Auxerre	Bolton Wanderers
1 September 2026	30 June 2027	Melvin Bard	Nice	Leeds United
1 September 2026	30 June 2027	Connor Barron	Rangers	Middlesbrough
1 September 2026	30 June 2027	Lucca Brughmans	Liverpool	Genk
1 September 2026	30 June 2027	Bradley Burrowes	Aston Villa	Wigan Athletic
1 September 2026	30 June 2027	Josef Bursik	Portsmouth	AFC Wimbledon
1 September 2026	30 June 2027	Eli Campbell	Everton	Milton Keynes Dons
1 September 2026	30 June 2027	Fin Cartwright	Middlesbrough	Grimsby Town
1 September 2026	30 June 2027	Kaelan Casey	West Ham United	Stevenage
1 September 2026	30 June 2027	Eiran Cashin	Brighton & Hove Albion	Derby County
1 September 2026	30 June 2027	Sam Chambers	Leeds United	Northampton Town
1 September 2026	31 December 2026	James Collins	Lincoln City	Doncaster Rovers
1 September 2026	30 June 2026	Soumaïla Coulibaly	Strasbourg	Watford
1 September 2026	30 June 2027	Amario Cozier-Duberry	Brighton & Hove Albion	Middlesbrough
1 September 2026	30 June 2027	Sam Curtis	Sheffield United	Cambridge United
1 September 2026	30 June 2027	Kevin Danso	Tottenham Hotspur	Sunderland
1 September 2026	30 June 2027	Harvey Elliott	Liverpool	Valencia
1 September 2026	30 June 2027	Dário Essugo	Chelsea	Strasbourg
1 September 2026	30 June 2027	Antony Evans	Walsall	Huddersfield Town
1 September 2026	30 June 2027	Keyrol Figueroa	Liverpool	Port Vale
1 September 2026	30 June 2027	Ibrahim Fullah	Charlton Athletic	Milton Keynes Dons
1 September 2026	30 June 2027	Mohammed Fuseini	Union Saint-Gilloise	Derby County
1 September 2026	30 June 2027	Jack Grealish	Manchester City	Everton
1 September 2026	30 June 2027	Wilfried Gnonto	Leeds United	Fiorentina
1 September 2026	30 June 2027	Jaden Heskey	Manchester City	Sheffield Wednesday
1 September 2026	30 June 2027	Cameron Humphreys	Ipswich Town	Huddersfield Town
1 September 2026	30 June 2027	Hwang Hee-chan	Wolverhampton Wanderers	Schalke 04
1 September 2026	30 June 2027	David Kamara	Peterborough United	Tranmere Rovers
1 September 2026	30 June 2027	Liam Kitching	Coventry City	Sheffield United
1 September 2026	30 June 2027	Hugo Larsson	Eintracht Frankfurt	Fulham
1 September 2026	30 June 2027	Klaidi Lolos	Peterborough United	Rotherham United
1 September 2026	30 June 2027	Hayden Matthews	Portsmouth	Bradford City
1 September 2026	30 June 2026	Stephy Mavididi	Leicester City	Watford
1 September 2026	30 June 2027	Jakov Medić	Norwich City	Utrecht
1 September 2026	30 June 2027	Jayden Meghoma	Brentford	Portsmouth
1 September 2026	31 December 2026	Tudor Mendel-Idowu	Ipswich Town	Luton Town
1 September 2026	30 June 2027	Liam Millar	Hull City	Birmingham City
1 September 2026	30 June 2027	Branimir Mlačić	Udinese	Watford
1 September 2026	30 June 2027	Morato	Nottingham Forest	West Ham United
1 September 2026	30 June 2027	Mykhailo Mudryk	Chelsea	Tottenham Hotspur
1 September 2026	30 June 2027	George Nevett	Peterborough United	Tranmere Rovers
1 September 2026	30 June 2027	Ethan Nwaneri	Arsenal	Borussia Dortmund
1 September 2026	30 June 2027	Chiedozie Ogbene	Ipswich Town	Lincoln City
1 September 2026	30 June 2027	Mark O'Mahony	Brighton & Hove Albion	Burton Albion
1 September 2026	30 June 2027	Darío Osorio	Midtjylland	Crystal Palace
1 September 2026	30 June 2027	Josh Powell	Nottingham Forest	Northampton Town
1 September 2026	30 June 2027	Largie Ramazani	Leeds United	Burnley
1 September 2026	30 June 2027	Dujuan Richards	Chelsea	AFC Wimbledon
1 September 2026	30 June 2027	Triston Rowe	Aston Villa	Charleroi
1 September 2026	30 June 2027	Robert Sánchez	Chelsea	Como
1 September 2026	30 June 2027	Pape Matar Sarr	Tottenham Hotspur	Juventus
1 September 2026	30 June 2027	George Sebine	Huddersfield Town	Rotherham United
1 September 2026	30 June 2027	Tommy Setford	Arsenal	Stevenage
1 September 2026	30 June 2027	Mark Shelton	York City	Grimsby Town
1 September 2026	30 June 2027	Freddie Simmonds	Brighton & Hove Albion	AFC Wimbledon
1 September 2026	30 June 2027	Yukinari Sugawara	Southampton	Cagliari
1 September 2026	30 June 2027	Kōta Takai	Tottenham Hotspur	Sint-Truiden
1 September 2026	30 June 2027	Charlie Tasker	Brighton & Hove Albion	Rochdale
1 September 2026	30 June 2027	Sidnei Tavares	Blackburn Rovers	Wisła Płock
1 September 2026	30 June 2027	Jack Taylor	Stevenage	Exeter City
1 September 2026	30 June 2027	Jean-Clair Todibo	West Ham United	Lens
1 September 2026	30 June 2027	Robinio Vaz	Roma	Hull City
1 September 2026	30 June 2027	Jack Grealish	Manchester City	Everton
1 September 2026	30 June 2027	Nick Woltemade	Newcastle United	Juventus
