= 2026–27 Rotherham United F.C. season =

102nd season in existence of Rotherham United FC

Rotherham United
2026–27 season
- Chairman: Tony Stewart
- Head coach: Alex Bruce
- Stadium: New York Stadium

The 2026–27 season is the 102nd season in the history of Rotherham United Football Club and their first season back being in League Two since the 2012–13 season following relegation from League One in the preceding season. In addition to the domestic league, the club would also participate in the FA Cup, the EFL Cup, and the EFL Trophy.

Prior to the season starting, Alex Bruce was appointed as head coach on a two-year contract.

== Transfers and contracts ==
=== In ===
Date	Pos.	Player	From	Fee	Ref.
1 July 2026 (Note: The transfer was announced on 27 June, and would become official on July 1 once Tavares's contract at Burton Albion expired.)	CF	(Portugal) Fábio Tavares	(England) Burton Albion	Free	
7 July 2026	RW	(France) Aaron Nemane	(England) Milton Keynes Dons	Free	
10 July 2026	CDM	(England) Ossama Ashley	(England) Salford City	Free	
10 July 2026	CM	(England) Jamie Jellis	(England) Walsall	Free	
29 July 2026	CF	(England) Paul Mullin	(Wales) Wrexham	Free	
4 August 2026	CB	(Trinidad and Tobago) Kieran Ngwenya	(Scotland) Dunfermline Athletic	Free	
4 August 2026	CB	(Scotland) Ewan Otoo	(Scotland) Dunfermline Athletic	Free	
5 August 2026	CF	(Wales) Tom Bradshaw	(England) Oxford United	Free	
7 August 2026	CB	(England) Sonny Aljofree	(England) Manchester United	Free	
27 August 2026	CM	(England) Josh Austerfield	(England) Salford City	Undisclosed	
15 September 2026	CB	(England) Dominic Iorfa	(England) Sheffield Wednesday	Free	
23 October 2026	LB	(England) Brandon Williams	Free agent	—N/a	

=== Loaned in ===
Date	Pos.	Player	From	Loaned until	Ref.
28 July 2026	LB	(England) Jili Buyabu	(England) Sheffield United	End of Season	
11 August 2026	GK	(United States) Julian Eyestone	(England) Brentford	End of Season	
31 August 2026	CM	(England) Jayce Fitzgerald	(England) Manchester United	End of Season	
1 September 2026	CAM	(Greece) Klaidi Lolos	(England) Peterborough United	End of Season	
1 September 2026	CF	(England) George Sebine	(England) Huddersfield Town	End of Season	

=== Loaned out ===
Date	Pos.	Player	To	Loaned until	Ref.
14 August 2026	CF	(England) Dean Gardner	(England) Matlock Town	22 October 2026 (Note: On 17 September, Gardner's initial one-month loan at Matlock Town was extended by a further month. On 24 September it was extended again by another month.)	
20 August 2026	CF	(England) Reece Wilson	(England) Bridlington Town	17 September 2026	
21 August 2026	LM	(England) Kane Richardson	(England) North Ferriby	20 October 2026 (Note: On 24 September, Richardson's initial one-month loan at North Ferriby was extended by a further month)	
31 August 2026	CAM	(England) James Clarke	(England) Ossett United	28 September 2026	
2 September 2026	RW	(Curaçao) Ar'jany Martha	(Netherlands) Telstar	End of Season (Note: Option to make the move permanent.)	
24 September 2026	CM	(England) Cohen Lee	(England) Ilkeston Town	1 January 2027 (Note: On 27 October, Lee's initial one-month loan at Ilkeston Town was extended until January.)	

=== Out ===
Date	Pos.	Player	To	Fee	Ref.
24 July 2026	CF	(England) Sam Nombe	(England) Milton Keynes Dons	Undisclosed	

=== Released / Out of Contract ===
Date	Pos.	Player	Subsequent club	Join date	Ref.
30 June 2026	CF	(England) Josh Ayres	(England) Woking	1 July 2026	
30 June 2026	RW	(England) Jack Holmes	(England) Boston United	1 July 2026	
30 June 2026	CF	(England) Jordan Hugill	(England) Hartlepool United	1 July 2026	
30 June 2026	CF	(Northern Ireland) Ciaran McGuckin	(England) Harrogate Town	1 July 2026	
30 June 2026	CM	(England) Joe Powell	(England) Salford City	1 July 2026	
30 June 2026	CB	(England) Sean Raggett	(England) Colchester United	1 July 2026	
30 June 2026	CB	(Scotland) Zak Jules	(Turkey) Eyüpspor	7 July 2026	
30 June 2026	CM	(England) Dru Yearwood	(Portugal) Chaves	13 July 2026	
30 June 2026	CDM	(England) Shaun McWilliams	(England) Cheltenham Town	17 July 2026	
30 June 2026	GK	(England) Cameron Dawson	(England) Bradford City	13 August 2026	
30 June 2026	LB	(England) Reece James	(England) Sheffield Wednesday	24 August 2026	
30 June 2026	RW	(England) Duncan Watmore	Retired		
30 June 2026	CM	(England) Josh Benson			
30 June 2026	CAM	(England) Ben Hatton			
30 June 2026	CF	(Republic of Ireland) Joshua Kayode			
30 June 2026	CDM	(Scotland) Liam Kelly			

=== New Contract ===
Date	Pos.	Player	Contract until	Ref.
8 May 2026	RB	(Republic of Ireland) Joe Rafferty	30 June 2027	
17 July 2026	CB	(England) Harrison Duncan	30 June 2028 (Note: Option for a further year in the clubs favour.)	
17 July 2026	CF	(England) Dean Gardner	30 June 2028	
17 July 2026	CM	(England) Cohen Lee	30 June 2028	

== Pre-season and friendlies ==
On 1 June, The Millers announced their first two pre-season friendlies against Sheffield United and Alfreton Town. Three days later, a third opposition was confirmed in Derby County. A fourth and fifth was later added against Parkgate and Matlock Town. On 2 July, a short trip to face Emley was confirmed. A week later, Darlington were added to the schedule.

Win Draw Loss Fixtures

10 July 2026 Friendly	Parkgate	0–1	Rotherham United	Rawmarsh
19:00 BST		Report	Ramsell 86'	Stadium: Rotherham Hospice Community Stadium

14 July 2026 Friendly	Emley	1–1	Rotherham United	Emley
19:00 BST		Report	Clarke 40'	Stadium: Fantastic Media Welfare Ground

18 July 2026 Friendly	Matlock Town	1–1	Rotherham United	Matlock
15:00 BST	Abbey 9'	Report	Trialist C 52' (pen.)	Stadium: Proctor Cars Stadium; Attendance: 776

21 July 2026 Friendly	Alfreton Town	0–1	Rotherham United	Alfreton
19:30 BST		Report	Tavares 23'	Stadium: Impact Arena Stadium; Attendance: 399

25 July 2026 Friendly	Rotherham United	0–2	Sheffield United	Rotherham
15:00 BST		Report	Chong 43'; O'Hare 53'	Stadium: AESSEAL New York Stadium; Attendance: 3,933

28 July 2026 Friendly	Darlington	0–2	Rotherham United	Darlington
19:30 BST		Report	Trialist 3'; Spence 5'	Stadium: Blackwell Meadows

4 August 2026 Friendly	Rotherham United	1–1	Derby County	Rotherham
19:30 BST	Ashley 65', (yellow card) 84'	Report	Szmodics 9' (pen.); Clark (yellow card) 83'; Eames (yellow card) 87'	Stadium: AESSEAL New York Stadium; Attendance: 2,239 (1,108 away); Referee: James Bell

== Competitions ==
=== League Two ===
==== League table ====
Pos	Team	Pld	W	D	L	GF	GA	GD	Pts	Promotion, qualification or relegation
20	Oldham Athletic	15	4	3	8	16	21	−5	15	
21	Colchester United	14	3	6	5	14	19	−5	15	
22	Rochdale	15	4	3	8	17	27	−10	15	
23	Rotherham United	14	2	6	6	18	25	−7	12	Relegation to National League
24	Crawley Town	12	2	3	7	13	21	−8	9	Relegation to National League

Updated to match(es) played on 14 November 2026. Source: EFL Official Website
Rules for classification: 1) Points; 2) Goal difference; 3) Number of goals scored; 4) Head-to-head results; 5) Wins; 6) Away goals; 7) Penalty points (sec 9.5); 8) 12-point sending off offences

==== Results summary ====
Overall								Home						Away					
Pld	W	D	L	GF	GA	GD	Pts	W	D	L	GF	GA	GD	W	D	L	GF	GA	GD
14	2	6	6	18	25	−7	12	1	5	1	13	15	−2	1	1	5	5	10	−5

Last updated: 31 October 2026.
Source: Soccerway

==== Results by round ====
Round	1	2	3	4	5	6	7	8	9	10	11	12	13	14	15^{1}	16	17	18	19	20	21	22	23	24	25	26	27	28
Ground	A	H	H	A	A	H	A	H	A	H	A	H	H	A	H	A	H	A	H	A	H	A	A	H	H	A	A	H
Result	L	D	W	D	L	D	W	D	L	L	L	D	D	L	P													
Position	16	17	13	13	18	16	14	13	17	20	23	22	22	22	P													
Points	0	1	4	5	5	6	9	10	10	10	10	11	12	12	P													

Updated to match(es) played on 5 September 2026. Source: EFL
A = Away; H = Home; W = Win; D = Draw; L = Loss; P = Postponed
Notes:
- ^{1} Matchday 15 (vs. Crawley Town) was postponed due to international call-ups.

==== Matches ====
The League Two fixtures were released on 25 June 2026.

Win Draw Loss Fixtures

15 August 2026 1	Cheltenham Town	2–1	Rotherham United	Cheltenham
15:00 BST	McCann 30'; Tomkinson (yellow card) 38'; McWilliams (yellow card) 40'; Evans 71'; Sweeney (yellow card) 73'	Report	Spence (yellow card) 35'; Buyabu 62'	Stadium: EV Charger Points Stadium; Attendance: 4,467 (942 away); Referee: Harry Wager

22 August 2026 2	Rotherham United	1–1	York City	Rotherham
15:00 BST	Otoo 20'; Buyabu (yellow card) 78'; Cover (yellow card) 90+4'	Report	Newby 40'	Stadium: AESSEAL New York Stadium; Attendance: 9,807 (2,479 away); Referee: Declan Bourne

29 August 2026 3	Rotherham United	2–1	Chesterfield	Rotherham
15:00 BST	Tavares 12'; Cover (yellow card) 17'; Bradshaw (penalty missed) 41'; Buyabu (yellow card) 43'; Mullin 90'	Report	Bonis (yellow card) 18'; Mandeville 88' (pen.)	Stadium: AESSEAL New York Stadium; Attendance: 9,291 (2,285 away); Referee: Seb Stockbridge
Note: Fixture was initially scheduled for a 15:00 kick-off, but was brought forward two hours following advice from South Yorkshire Police.

1 September 2026 4	Tranmere Rovers	2–2	Rotherham United	Birkenhead
19:45 BST	Okoro 16'; Faulkner (yellow card) 74' (red card) 90+4'; Ince 87'; Davies (yellow card) 90+5'; McGee (yellow card) 90+6'	Report	Otoo (yellow card) 34'; Aljofree (yellow card) 69'; Nemane 84'; Bradshaw 90+6' (pen.)	Stadium: Prenton Park; Attendance: 6,137 (538 away); Referee: Martin Woods

5 September 2026 5	Bristol Rovers	1–0	Rotherham United	Bristol
15:00 BST	Leigh 32'; Mola (yellow card) 73'	Report	Fitzgerald (yellow card) 57'; Austerfield (yellow card) 74'; Ngwenya (yellow card) 90+5'	Stadium: Memorial Stadium; Attendance: 9,226 (462 away); Referee: Darren Drysdale

12 September 2026 6	Rotherham United	3–3	Salford City	Rotherham
15:00 BST	Hall (yellow card) 26'; Cover 33'; Mullin 35' (pen.); Ashley 55'; Austerfield (yellow card) 64'; Buyabu (yellow card) 73'	Report	Graydon 9'; Powell 31'; Cesay (yellow card) 44'; Odah (yellow card) 55' (yellow-red card) 69'; Langstaff 74' (pen.)	Stadium: AESSEAL New York Stadium; Attendance: 7,528 (381 away); Referee: Dean Whitestone

19 September 2026 7	Northampton Town	0–1	Rotherham United	Northampton
15:00 BST	Dyche (yellow card) 72'; Fornah (yellow card) 85'	Report	Austerfield (yellow card) 48'; Ashley (yellow card) 66'; Mullin 73' (pen.)	Stadium: Sixfields Stadium; Attendance: 5,771 (716 away); Referee: Will Finnie

26 September 2026 8	Rotherham United	1–1	Crewe Alexandra	Rotherham
15:00 BST	Bradshaw (yellow card) 41'; Mullin 44'	Report	Stephenson (yellow card) 13'; Iorfa 21' (o.g.); Ure (yellow card) 65'	Stadium: AESSEAL New York Stadium; Attendance: 7,860 (624 away); Referee: David Rock

3 October 2026 9	Exeter City	1–0	Rotherham United	Exeter
15:00 BST	Woodhouse (yellow card) 43'; Scully 51'; Cummins (yellow card) 90+2'	Report	Iorfa (yellow card) 58'	Stadium: St James Park; Attendance: 5,631 (310 away); Referee: Lewis Sandoe

10 October 2026 10	Rotherham United	1–4	Gillingham	Rotherham
15:00 BST	Mullin 17'; Eyestone (yellow card) 66'; Iorfa (yellow card) 75'; Aljofree (yellow card) 88'	Report	Hale 34', 67' (pen.); Brophy (yellow card) 47'; Dobbs (yellow card) 51'; Sillah 60'; Eaves 89' (pen.)	Stadium: AESSEAL New York Stadium; Attendance: 7,492 (565 away); Referee: William Davis

17 October 2026 11	Fleetwood Town	2–0	Rotherham United	Fleetwood
12:30 BST	Rooney 46'; Helm (yellow card) 65'; Coughlan (yellow card) 66', (goal) 80'; Lynch (yellow card) 89'; McCann (yellow card) 90+1'	Report	Cover (yellow card) 38'; Douglas (yellow card) 62'; Lolos (yellow card) 89'; Iorfa (yellow card) 90+1'	Stadium: Highbury Stadium; Referee: Steven Copeland
Note: Fixture was initially scheduled for a 15:00 kick-off, but was brought forward for live Sky Sports broadcasting.

20 October 2026 12	Rotherham United	2–2	Newport County	Rotherham
19:45 BST (UTC+1)	Mullin 4' (pen.), (yellow card) 42'; Nemane 12'; Jellis (yellow card) 16'; Douglas (yellow card) 89'	Report	Biggins 28' (pen.); Garner (yellow card) 42', (goal) 54'	Stadium: New York Stadium; Attendance: 6,524; Referee: Callum Jones

24 October 2026 13	Rotherham United	3–3	Shrewsbury Town	Rotherham
15:00 BST	Mullin 16', 18'; Spence (red card) 21'; Bradshaw 76'; Hall (yellow card) 90+4'	Report	Davison 24'; Ruffels 59'; Boyle 67'; McMahon-Brown (red card) 83'	Stadium: AESSEAL New York Stadium; Attendance: 7,562; Referee: James Oldham

31 October 2026 14	Swindon Town	2–1	Rotherham United	Swindon
15:00 GMT	Thomson 45+3'; Hungbo 81'	Report	Buyabu (red card) 4'; Ngwenya (yellow card) 72'; Iorfa (red card) 79'; Hall 87', (yellow card) 90+5'	Stadium: Nigel Eady County Ground; Attendance: 7,515 (406 away); Referee: Isaac Searle

14 November 2026 15	Rotherham United	Postponed	Crawley Town	Rotherham
15:00 GMT				Stadium: AESSEAL New York Stadium
Note: Fixture was postponed due to international call-ups.

21 November 2026 16	Grimsby Town	v	Rotherham United	Cleethorpes
15:00 GMT				Stadium: Blundell Park

28 November 2026 17	Rotherham United	v	Oldham Athletic	Rotherham
15:00 GMT				Stadium: AESSEAL New York Stadium

1 December 2026 18	Barnet	v	Rotherham United	Edgware
19:45 GMT				Stadium: The Hive Stadium

12 December 2026 19	Rotherham United	v	Walsall	Rotherham
15:00 GMT				Stadium: AESSEAL New York Stadium

19 December 2026 20	Port Vale	v	Rotherham United	Burslem
15:00 GMT				Stadium: Vale Park

26 December 2026 21	Rotherham United	v	Rochdale	Rotherham
15:00 GMT				Stadium: AESSEAL New York Stadium

29 December 2026 22	Accrington Stanley	v	Rotherham United	Accrington
19:45 GMT				Stadium: Wham Stadium

1 January 2027 23	Colchester United	v	Rotherham United	Colchester
15:00 GMT				Stadium: JobServe Community Stadium

9 January 2027 24	Rotherham United	v	Port Vale	Rotherham
15:00 GMT				Stadium: AESSEAL New York Stadium

16 January 2027 25	Rotherham United	v	Fleetwood Town	Rotherham
15:00 GMT				Stadium: AESSEAL New York Stadium

19 January 2027 26	Newport County	v	Rotherham United	Newport
20:00 GMT				Stadium: Rodney Parade
Note: Fixture was initially scheduled for a 19:45 kick-off, but was pushed back fifteen minutes for live Sky Sports broadcasting.

23 January 2027 27	Shrewsbury Town	v	Rotherham United	Shrewsbury
15:00 GMT				Stadium: Croud Meadow

30 January 2027 28	Rotherham United	v	Swindon Town	Rotherham
12:30 GMT				Stadium: AESSEAL New York Stadium
Note: Fixture was initially scheduled for a 15:00 kick-off, but was brought forward for live Sky Sports broadcasting.

=== FA Cup ===
Rotherham were drawn away to Bromley in the first round and home to Bristol Rovers in the second round.

Win Draw Loss Fixtures

7 November 2026 First round	Bromley	0–2	Rotherham United	Bromley
15:00 GMT	Mendy (yellow card) 30'	Report	Aljofree 45+1'; Bradshaw 56'	Stadium: The CopperJax Community Stadium; Attendance: 2,044 (303 away); Referee: Sam Mulhall

5 December 2026 Second round	Rotherham United	v	Bristol Rovers	Rotherham
15:00 GMT				Stadium: AESSEAL New York Stadium

=== EFL Cup ===
The draw for the first round was made on 25 June.

Win Draw Loss Fixtures

8 August 2026 First round	Rotherham United	1–4	West Bromwich Albion	Rotherham
17:30 BST	Cover (yellow card) 78'; Tavares 87', (yellow card) 90+2'	Report	Morgan 8', 61'; Whitwell 24'; Myhre 55'	Stadium: AESSEAL New York Stadium; Attendance: 4,850 (2,495 away); Referee: Tom Reeves

=== EFL Trophy ===
==== Group stage ====
Rotherham were drawn against Bradford City, York City and Newcastle United U21 into Northern Group C.

Pos	Div	Team	Pld	W	PW	PL	L	GF	GA	GD	Pts	Qualification
1	L1	Bradford City	3	3	0	0	0	10	1	+9	9	Advance to Round 2
2	ACA	Newcastle United U21	3	2	0	0	1	5	3	+2	6	Advance to Round 2
3	L2	Rotherham United	3	0	1	0	2	1	6	−5	2	
4	L2	York City	3	0	0	1	2	2	8	−6	1	

Source: EFL

Win Draw Loss Fixtures

22 September 2026 Group stage	York City	1–1 (4–5 p)	Rotherham United	Huntington
19:00 BST	Medley 44'; Palmer (yellow card) 50'	Report	Buyabu 57'	Stadium: LNER Community Stadium; Attendance: 1,955 (354 away); Referee: Dale Baines
	Penalties
	Read (penalty scored); Akinyemi (penalty scored); Stiver (penalty scored); Malcolm (penalty missed); Farrar (penalty scored)		Mullin (penalty scored); Fitzgerald (penalty scored); Rafferty (penalty scored); Hall (penalty scored); Buyabu (penalty scored)

6 October 2026 Group stage	Rotherham United	0–4	Bradford City	Rotherham
19:00 BST	Buyabu (yellow card) 17'; Fitzgerald (yellow card) 43'; Austerfield (yellow card) 81'		Swan 3', 62'; Humphrys 11'; Powell 86' (pen.)	Stadium: AESSEAL New York Stadium; Attendance: 1,498; Referee: Jamie Robinson

3 November 2026 Group stage	Rotherham United	0–1	Newcastle United U21	Rotherham
19:00 GMT	Spence (yellow card) 60'; Aljofree (yellow card) 63'	Report	Thompson 34'; Johnson (yellow card) 85'	Stadium: AESSEAL New York Stadium; Attendance: 805 (72 away); Referee: Sunny Singh Gill

== Statistics ==
=== Appearances and goals ===
As of match played 7 November 2026

Players with no appearances are not included on the list; italics indicate a loaned in player

No.	Pos	Nat	Player	Total		League Two		FA Cup		EFL Cup		EFL Trophy	
No.	Pos	Nat	Player	Apps	Goals	Apps	Goals	Apps	Goals	Apps	Goals	Apps	Goals
1	GK	(England) ENG	Ted Cann	10	0	5+0	0	1+0	0	1+0	0	3+0	0
2	DF	(Republic of Ireland) IRL	Joe Rafferty	10	0	4+3	0	0+0	0	0+1	0	2+0	0
3	DF	(Scotland) SCO	Ewan Otoo	9	1	7+0	1	0+0	0	1+0	0	1+0	0
4	MF	(England) ENG	Josh Austerfield	14	0	10+1	0	1+0	0	0+0	0	0+2	0
5	DF	(Trinidad and Tobago) TTO	Kieran Ngwenya	13	0	6+5	0	1+0	0	0+0	0	1+0	0
6	MF	(England) ENG	Ossama Ashley	11	1	6+2	1	0+0	0	1+0	0	1+1	0
7	FW	(Portugal) POR	Fábio Tavares	9	2	7+0	1	0+0	0	1+0	1	1+0	0
8	MF	(England) ENG	Kian Spence	15	0	8+3	0	0+0	0	1+0	0	3+0	0
9	FW	(Wales) WAL	Tom Bradshaw	18	3	4+10	2	1+0	1	0+0	0	2+1	0
10	FW	(England) ENG	Paul Mullin	17	8	12+2	8	0+0	0	1+0	0	0+2	0
11	DF	(Curaçao) CUW	Ar'jany Martha	5	0	0+4	0	0+0	0	0+1	0	0+0	0
12	DF	(Jamaica) JAM	Denzel Hall	19	1	14+0	1	1+0	0	1+0	0	1+2	0
13	GK	(United States) USA	Julian Eyestone	9	0	9+0	0	0+0	0	0+0	0	0+0	0
14	DF	(England) ENG	Sonny Aljofree	16	1	11+2	0	1+0	1	1+0	0	1+0	0
15	MF	(England) ENG	Jayce Fitzgerald	14	0	5+5	0	1+0	0	0+0	0	3+0	0
16	DF	(Republic of Ireland) IRL	Emmanuel Adegboyega	7	0	2+2	0	0+0	0	1+0	0	2+0	0
17	DF	(England) ENG	Marvin Kaleta	4	0	1+1	0	0+0	0	0+0	0	1+1	0
18	DF	(Scotland) SCO	Lenny Agbaire	2	0	2+0	0	0+0	0	0+0	0	0+0	0
19	FW	(England) ENG	George Sebine	5	0	0+3	0	1+0	0	0+0	0	1+0	0
20	FW	(Greece) GRE	Klaidi Lolos	5	0	0+3	0	0+1	0	0+0	0	1+0	0
22	MF	(England) ENG	Jamie Jellis	5	0	3+1	0	0+0	0	1+0	0	0+0	0
23	FW	(France) FRA	Aaron Nemane	16	2	6+5	2	1+0	0	0+1	0	2+1	0
24	DF	(England) ENG	Jili Buyabu	17	2	12+2	1	0+0	0	1+0	0	2+0	1
26	DF	(England) ENG	Hamish Douglas	5	0	2+1	0	0+0	0	0+0	0	2+0	0
27	DF	(England) ENG	Dominic Iorfa	9	0	8+0	0	0+0	0	0+0	0	1+0	0
28	MF	(Jamaica) JAM	Brandon Cover	14	1	10+1	1	1+0	0	0+1	0	0+1	0
33	DF	(England) ENG	Brandon Williams	4	0	0+2	0	1+0	0	0+0	0	1+0	0
36	DF	(England) ENG	Harrison Duncan	1	0	0+0	0	0+0	0	0+0	0	0+1	0
38	MF	(England) ENG	Kane Richardson	2	0	0+0	0	0+0	0	0+0	0	1+1	0
39	FW	(England) ENG	Dean Gardner	1	0	0+0	0	0+1	0	0+0	0	0+0	0

=== Disciplinary record ===
As of match played 7 November 2026

Rank	Number	Position	Nationality	Player	League Two			FA Cup			EFL Cup			EFL Trophy			Total		
Rank	Number	Position	Nationality	Player	Yellow card	(yellow card) (yellow-red card)	Red card	Yellow card	(yellow card) (yellow-red card)	Red card	Yellow card	(yellow card) (yellow-red card)	Red card	Yellow card	(yellow card) (yellow-red card)	Red card	Yellow card	(yellow card) (yellow-red card)	Red card
1	24	LB	(England)	Jili Buyabu	3	0	1	0	0	0	0	0	0	1	0	0	4	0	1
2	27	CB	(England)	Dominic Iorfa	3	0	1	0	0	0	0	0	0	0	0	0	3	0	1
3	4	CM	(England)	Josh Austerfield	3	0	0	0	0	0	0	0	0	1	0	0	4	0	0
3	28	CDM	(Jamaica)	Brandon Cover	3	0	0	0	0	0	1	0	0	0	0	0	4	0	0
5	12	RB	(Netherlands)	Denzel Hall	3	0	0	0	0	0	0	0	0	0	0	0	3	0	0
5	14	CB	(England)	Sonny Aljofree	2	0	0	0	0	0	0	0	0	1	0	0	3	0	0
7	5	CB	(Trinidad and Tobago)	Kieran Ngwenya	2	0	0	0	0	0	0	0	0	0	0	0	2	0	0
7	8	CM	(England)	Kian Spence	1	0	0	0	0	0	0	0	0	1	0	0	2	0	0
7	15	CM	(England)	Jayce Fitzgerald	1	0	0	0	0	0	0	0	0	1	0	0	2	0	0
7	26	CB	(England)	Hamish Douglas	2	0	0	0	0	0	0	0	0	0	0	0	2	0	0
11	3	CB	(Scotland)	Ewan Otoo	1	0	0	0	0	0	0	0	0	0	0	0	1	0	0
11	6	CDM	(England)	Ossama Ashley	1	0	0	0	0	0	0	0	0	0	0	0	1	0	0
11	7	CF	(Portugal)	Fábio Tavares	0	0	0	0	0	0	1	0	0	0	0	0	1	0	0
11	9	CF	(Wales)	Tom Bradshaw	1	0	0	0	0	0	0	0	0	0	0	0	1	0	0
11	10	CF	(England)	Paul Mullin	1	0	0	0	0	0	0	0	0	0	0	0	1	0	0
11	13	GK	(United States)	Julian Eyestone	1	0	0	0	0	0	0	0	0	0	0	0	1	0	0
11	20	CF	(Greece)	Klaidi Lolos	1	0	0	0	0	0	0	0	0	0	0	0	1	0	0
11	22	CM	(England)	Jamie Jellis	1	0	0	0	0	0	0	0	0	0	0	0	1	0	0
Total					30	0	2	0	0	0	2	0	0	5	0	0	37	0	2
