= Julian Eyestone =

American soccer player

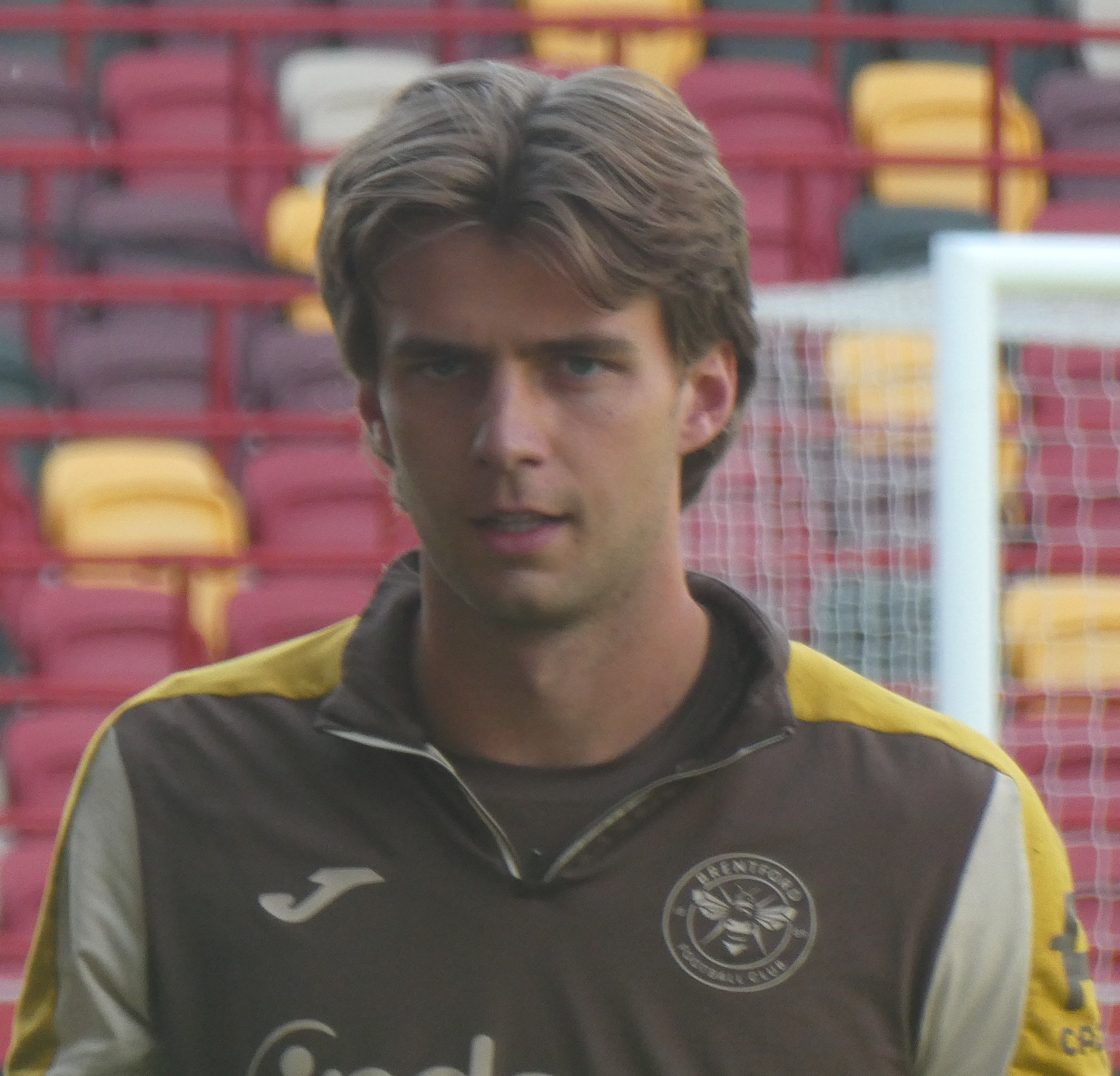
- Eyestone prior to a Brentford B match in 2026

Personal information
- Full name: Julian Ryan Eyestone
- Date of birth: May 21, 2006 (age 20)
- Place of birth: Dallas, Texas, United States
- Height: 6 ft 6 in (1.98 m)
- Position: Goalkeeper

Team information
- Current team: Rotherham United (on loan from Brentford)
- Number: 13

Youth career
- –2015: Solar
- 2015–2023: FC Dallas
- 2024–2025: Brentford

College career
Years	Team	Apps	(Gls)
2023	Duke Blue Devils	18	(0)

Senior career*
Years	Team	Apps	(Gls)
2022–2023	North Texas SC	9	(0)
2025–	Brentford	0	(0)
2026–	→ Rotherham United (loan)	1	(0)

International career^{‡}
2024	United States U19	2	(0)
2024–2025	United States U20	5	(0)
2026–	United States U21	1	(0)
- * Club domestic league appearances and goals as of 16:21, 12 September 2026 (UTC) ‡ National team caps and goals as of 21:44, June 9, 2026 (UTC)

Julian Ryan Eyestone (born May 21, 2006) is an American professional soccer player who plays as a goalkeeper for EFL League Two club Rotherham United, on loan from Premier League club Brentford.

Eyestone is a product of the FC Dallas academy and the Duke Blue Devils and gained his first senior experience with North Texas SC. He began his professional career in England with Brentford in 2024. Eyestone has been capped by the United States at youth level.

== Club career ==
=== Youth and college years ===
A goalkeeper, Eyestone began his youth career with Solar. He joined the FC Dallas academy in 2015 and progressed sufficiently to begin training "on and off" with the first team squad at age 15. Eyestone furthered his progression with 9 MLS Next Pro appearances for North Texas SC (the FC Dallas reserve team) during the 2022 and 2023 seasons. His MLS Next Pro performances were such that he was named in the squad for the 2023 MLS Next All-Star Game.

Eyestone departed to join college team Duke Blue Devils in 2023 and made 18 appearances during the 2023 ACC season. His performances saw him named to the ACC All-Freshman and All-ACC Second teams. In December 2023, Eyestone announced on social media that in order to pursue a professional career, he would forego the remainder of his college eligibility.

=== Brentford ===
On June 21, 2024, Eyestone joined the B team at Premier League club Brentford and signed a three-year contract, with the option of a further year, on a free transfer. He was included in the first team squad for its final 2024–25 pre-season match and remained an unused substitute. Shortly after the beginning of the regular season, Eyestone kept a clean sheet on a starting appearance in a first team friendly. He was an unused substitute for the first team on two occasions during the 2024–25 regular season and took part in first team training. Eyestone made 24 B team appearances during the season and was part of the Professional U21 Development League-winning squad.

Eyestone was promoted into the first team squad in July 2025 signed a new six-year contract, with the option of two further years. He was an unused substitute on one occasion during the 2025–26 season and was part of the B team squad that finished as winners of the Professional U21 Development League league phase.

On August 11, 2026, Eyestone joined League Two club Rotherham United on loan until the end of the 2026–27 season.

== International career ==
Eyestone was called into United States U17 training camps in November 2021, August 2022 and April 2023. He won two friendly caps for the U19 team during the 2023–24 season. Eyestone won his maiden call into the U20 squad for the 2024 CONCACAF U20 Championship and made one appearance during the team's run to the final. Eyestone won his maiden call into the U21 squad for a pair of friendlies in June 2026. He made his debut in the second match, a 1–0 defeat to Uzbekistan U23. After training goalkeeper Diego Kochen withdrew due to injury, Eyestone was called into the extended senior squad for the remainder of its 2026 World Cup campaign.

== Personal life ==
Eyestone attended Lone Star High School. As of April 2025, Eyestone was studying online for a liberal arts degree with the University of Pennsylvania.

== Career statistics ==
As of match played September 12, 2026

Appearances and goals by club, season and competition
Club	Season	League			National cup (Note: Includes FA Cup)		League cup (Note: Includes EFL Cup)		Other		Total	
Club	Season	Division	Apps	Goals	Apps	Goals	Apps	Goals	Apps	Goals	Apps	Goals
North Texas SC	2022	MLS Next Pro	1	0	―		―		0	0	1	0
North Texas SC	2023	MLS Next Pro	8	0	―		―		―		8	0
North Texas SC	Total		9	0	―		―		0	0	9	0
Brentford	2024–25	Premier League	0	0	0	0	0	0	―		0	0
Brentford	2025–26	Premier League	0	0	0	0	0	0	―		0	0
Brentford	Total		0	0	0	0	0	0	―		9	0
Rotherham United (loan)	2026–27	League Two	1	0	0	0	―		0	0	1	0
Career total			10	0	0	0	0	0	0	0	10	0

== Honors ==
Brentford B

- London Senior Cup: 2021–22
