= Fábio Tavares (footballer, born 2001) =

Portuguese footballer

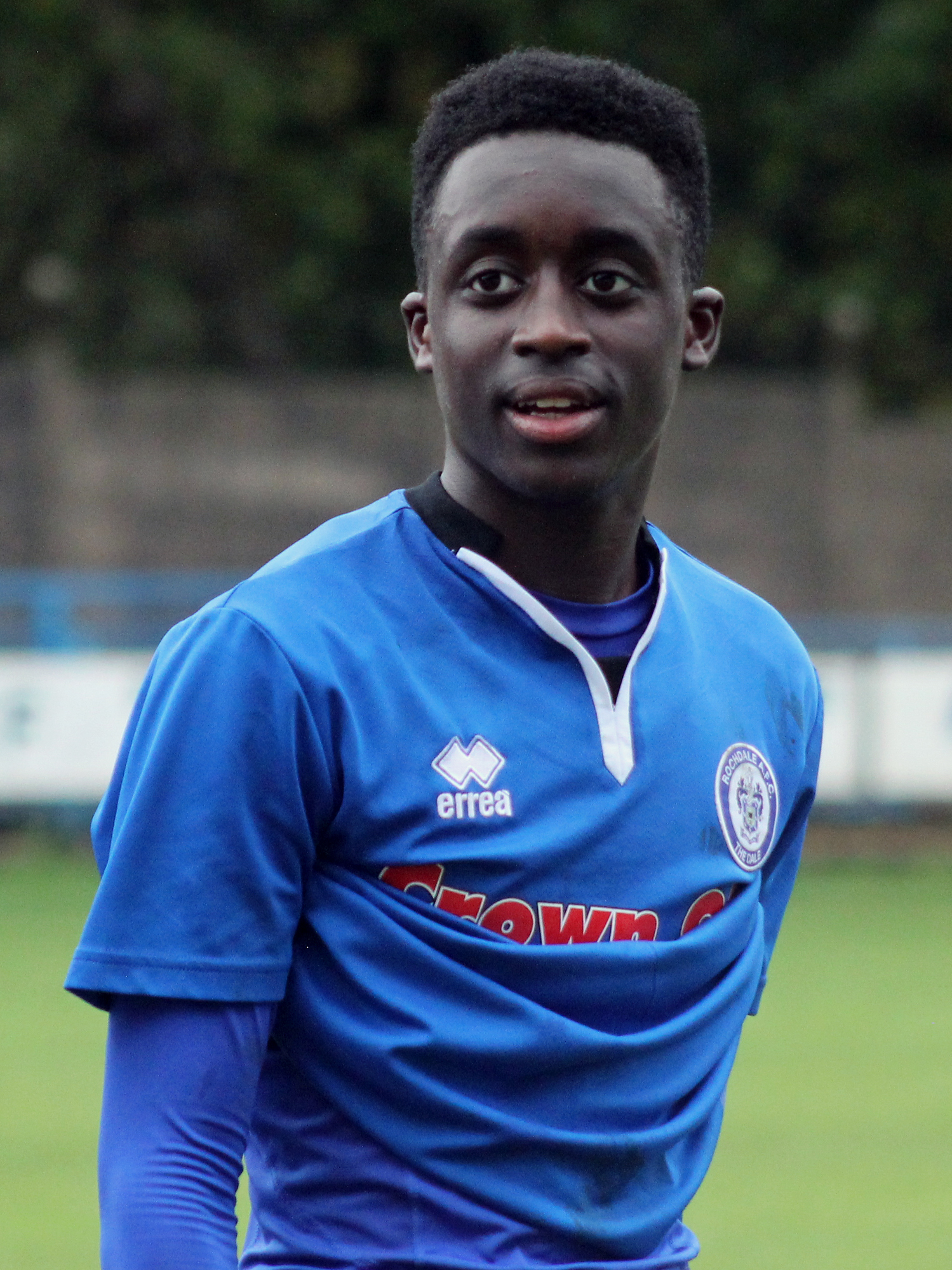
- Tavares playing for Rochdale U18 in October 2017

Personal information
- Full name: Fábio André Tavares Desidério
- Date of birth: 22 January 2001 (age 25)
- Place of birth: Matosinhos, Porto, Portugal
- Height: 1.78 m (5 ft 10 in)
- Position: Forward

Team information
- Current team: Rotherham United
- Number: 7

Youth career
- 2016–2019: Rochdale

Senior career*
Years	Team	Apps	(Gls)
2019–2021	Rochdale	26	(2)
2020	→ Curzon Ashton (loan)	3	(1)
2021–2025	Coventry City	22	(2)
2025	→ Burton Albion (loan)	10	(2)
2025–2026	Burton Albion	27	(4)
2026–	Rotherham United	4	(1)
- * Club domestic league appearances and goals as of 16 April 2026

Fábio André Tavares Desidério (born 22 January 2001) is a Portuguese professional footballer who plays as a forward for EFL League Two club Rotherham United.

== Career ==
=== Rochdale ===
On 28 June 2019, Tavares signed his first professional contract with Rochdale. Tavares made his professional debut for Rochdale in a 3-0 EFL League One loss to Wycombe Wanderers on 28 September 2019. On 21 February 2020, Tavares joined National League North side Curzon Ashton on loan until the end of the season.

=== Coventry City ===
On 1 February 2021, Tavares signed for Coventry City on a two-and-a-half-year contract for an undisclosed fee.

On 19 February 2022, Tavares made his first-team debut for Coventry as an 85th minute substitute (replacing Martyn Waghorn) against Barnsley at the CBS Arena. On 26 February 2022, Tavares scored his first goal for Coventry in a 1-1 draw against Preston North End at the CBS Arena. Tavares came on for his second appearance as a substitute in the 94th minute (replacing Callum O'Hare), and scored a magnificent equaliser with the last kick of the game in the 98th minute. Preston failed to clear a free kick deep in stoppage time, and Tavares bent a sublime right-footed shot into the top corner to salvage the game.

On 31 January 2025, Tavares joined League One side Burton Albion on loan for the remainder of the season.

=== Burton Albion ===
On 7 May 2026, the club said the player would leave in the summer once his contract expired.

=== Rotherham United ===
On 27 June 2026, Tavares joined League Two club Rotherham United on a two-year deal.

On 8 August 2026, Tavares scored his first goal for Rotherham in a 1-4 loss to West Bromwich Albion in a 1st round League Cup match.

== Career statistics ==
As of 15 August 2026

Club statistics
Club	Season	League			FA Cup		League Cup		Other		Total	
Club	Season	Division	Apps	Goals	Apps	Goals	Apps	Goals	Apps	Goals	Apps	Goals
Rochdale	2019–20	League One	14	1	4	0	0	0	3 (Note: Appearances in the EFL Trophy)	1	21	2
Rochdale	2020–21	League One	12	1	1	0	2	0	3	1	18	2
Rochdale	Total		26	2	5	0	2	0	6	2	39	4
Curzon Ashton (loan)	2019–20	National League North	3	1	0	0	—				3	1
Coventry City	2020–21	Championship	0	0	0	0	0	0	—		0	0
Coventry City	2021–22	Championship	7	1	0	0	0	0	—		7	1
Coventry City	2022–23	Championship	9	0	1	0	1	0	—		11	0
Coventry City	2023–24	Championship	5	1	5	2	0	0	—		10	3
Coventry City	2024–25	Championship	1	0	0	0	1	0	—		2	0
Total			22	2	6	2	2	0	0	0	30	4
Burton Albion (loan)	2024–25	League One	10	2	0	0	0	0	0	0	10	2
Burton Albion	2025–26	League One	27	4	3	3	2	0	3	1	35	8
Rotherham United	2026–27	League Two	1	0	0	0	1	1	0	0	2	1
Career totals			89	15	14	5	7	1	9	3	119	20
