= Kieran Ngwenya =

Professional footballer (born 2002)

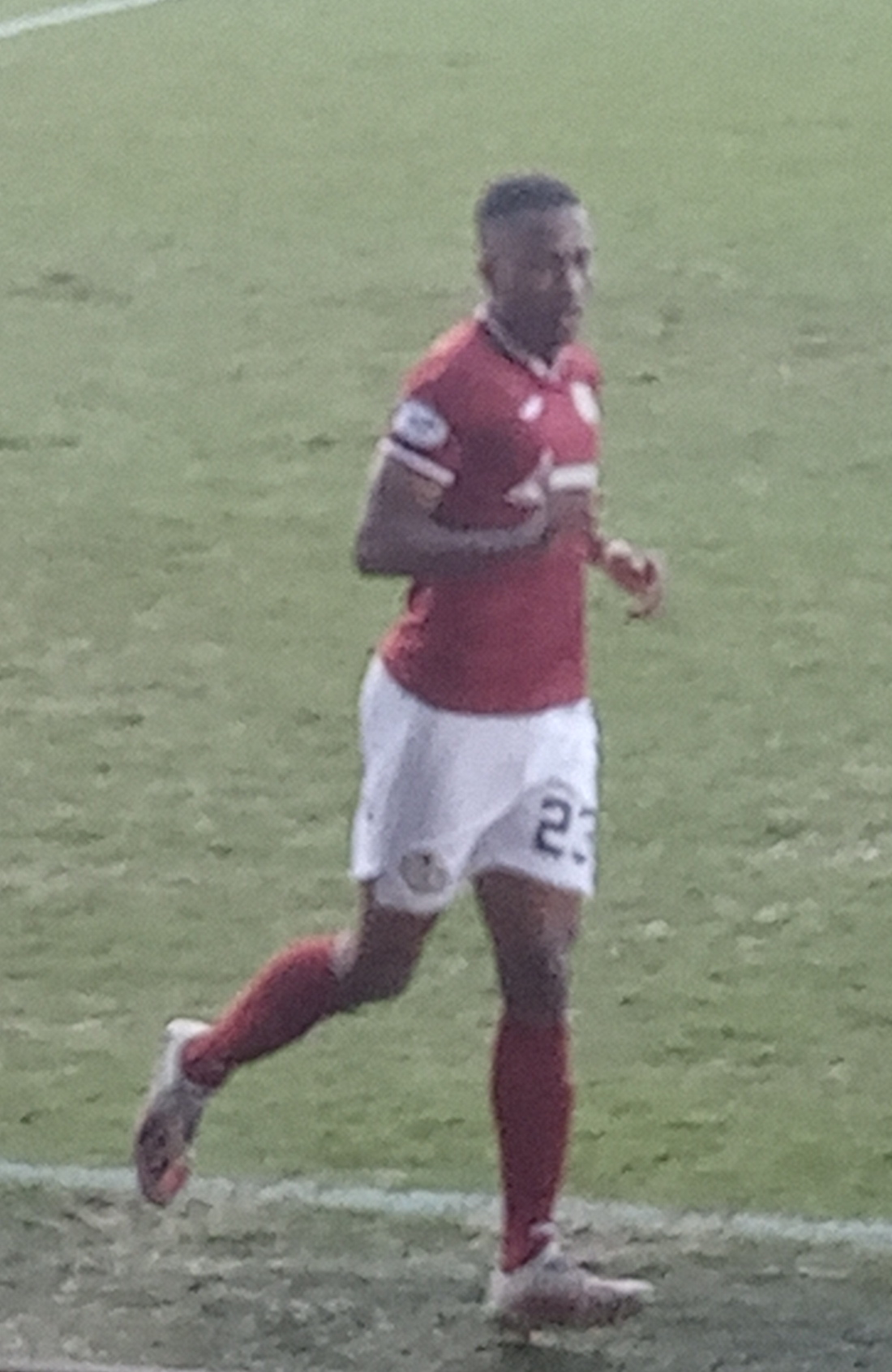
- Ngwenya playing for Kelty Hearts

Personal information
- Full name: Kieran Tendelo Ngwenya
- Date of birth: 25 September 2002 (age 24)
- Place of birth: Glasgow, Scotland
- Height: 1.83 m (6 ft 0 in)
- Position: Centre-back

Team information
- Current team: Rotherham United
- Number: 5

Youth career
- Tynecastle
- –2020: Aberdeen

Senior career*
Years	Team	Apps	(Gls)
2020–2024	Aberdeen	2	(0)
2021	→ Cove Rangers (loan)	7	(0)
2021–2022	→ Kelty Hearts (loan)	25	(0)
2022–2023	→ Raith Rovers (loan)	25	(0)
2023–2024	→ Partick Thistle (loan)	16	(0)
2024–2026	Dunfermline Athletic	41	(4)
2026–	Rotherham United	3	(0)

International career^{‡}
2021–2023	Malawi	2	(0)
2026–	Trinidad and Tobago	1	(0)
- * Club domestic league appearances and goals as of 4 August 2026 ‡ National team caps and goals as of 31 May 2026

Kieran Tendelo Ngwenya (born 25 September 2002) is a professional footballer who plays as a centre-back for EFL League Two club Rotherham United. Born in Scotland, he represented Malawi internationally before making his debut for the Trinidad and Tobago national team in 2026.

== Club career ==
=== Aberdeen ===
Born in Glasgow, Ngwenya moved to Edinburgh shortly after his fourth birthday and attended Stewart's Melville College. During his youth, he played for Tynecastle before joining the academy of Aberdeen.

Ngwenya made his professional debut for Aberdeen in a league victory over Ross County in December 2020, aged 18.

=== Loan spells ===
In March 2021, Ngwenya joined Scottish League One club Cove Rangers on loan. He made seven appearances during his spell with the club.

In September 2021, he joined Kelty Hearts on loan. The move provided Ngwenya with his first prolonged spell of senior football. He made 27 appearances in all competitions, scoring once and providing four assists.

In July 2022, Ngwenya joined Scottish Championship club Raith Rovers on an initial six-month loan agreement. He made 30 appearances in all competitions during his time at Stark's Park.

Ngwenya returned to the Scottish Championship in August 2023, joining Partick Thistle on a season-long loan. He made 21 appearances in all competitions for the club.

=== Dunfermline Athletic ===
On 27 June 2024, Ngwenya joined Dunfermline Athletic on a two-year contract following his departure from Aberdeen.

Ngwenya made 61 appearances in league and cup competitions during his two seasons at Dunfermline. His final season at the club included four goals in 15 regular-season Scottish Championship appearances, as well as appearances during Dunfermline's play-off and cup campaigns.

Ngwenya had a loyal supporters group who often attended games with a flag displaying Ngwenya on top of a Yemen flag (The colours of Dunfermline Athletic)

He left Dunfermline following the expiration of his contract in May 2026.

=== Rotherham United ===
On 4 August 2026, Ngwenya signed for EFL League Two club Rotherham United on a two-year contract. The signing was announced as being subject to English Football League, Football Association and international clearance.

He became Rotherham's eighth signing of the summer and joined the club shortly after his former Dunfermline teammate Ewan Otoo.

== International career ==
Born in Scotland, Ngwenya is eligible to represent both Malawi and Trinidad and Tobago through his parents.

He made his senior international debut for Malawi in June 2021, starting a 2–0 friendly defeat against Tanzania. He also represented Malawi against Bangladesh.

Ngwenya was called up to the Trinidad and Tobago squad for a series of international fixtures in May 2026. He made his debut for Trinidad and Tobago against South Korea, playing the full match in a 5–0 defeat on 31 May 2026.

Ngwenya is a dual international, having represented two senior national teams.

== Playing style ==
Ngwenya is a versatile left-footed defender who can play as a central defender or left-back. During his career with Dunfermline, he was also used in more advanced roles on the left side of the pitch.

== Career statistics ==
As of matches played 4 August 2026

Appearances and goals by club, season and competition
Club	Season	League			National cup		League Cup		Other		Total	
Club	Season	Division	Apps	Goals	Apps	Goals	Apps	Goals	Apps	Goals	Apps	Goals
Aberdeen	2020–21	Scottish Premiership	2	0	0	0	0	0	0	0	2	0
Aberdeen	2021–22	Scottish Premiership	0	0	0	0	0	0	0	0	0	0
Aberdeen	2022–23	Scottish Premiership	0	0	0	0	0	0	0	0	0	0
Aberdeen	2023–24	Scottish Premiership	0	0	0	0	0	0	0	0	0	0
Aberdeen	Total		2	0	0	0	0	0	0	0	2	0
Cove Rangers (loan)	2020–21	Scottish League One	7	0	0	0	0	0	0	0	7	0
Kelty Hearts (loan)	2021–22	Scottish League Two	25	0	2	0	0	0	1 (Note: Appearance in the Scottish Challenge Cup)	0	28	0
Raith Rovers (loan)	2022–23	Scottish Championship	25	0	3	0	0	0	1	0	29	0
Partick Thistle (loan)	2023–24	Scottish Championship	16	0	1	0	1	0	0	0	18	0
Dunfermline Athletic	2024–25	Scottish Championship	26	0	2	0	4	0	2	0	34	0
Dunfermline Athletic	2025–26	Scottish Championship	15	4	—		—		—		15	4
Dunfermline Athletic	Total		41	4	2	0	4	0	2	0	49	4
Rotherham United	2026–27	EFL League One	0	0	0	0	0	0	0	0	0	0
Career total			116	4	8	0	5	0	4	0	133	4
