= Jili Buyabu =

English footballer (born 2003)

Personal information
- Full name: Jili Buyabu
- Date of birth: 9 August 2003 (age 23)
- Place of birth: Enfield, England
- Height: 1.82 m (6 ft 0 in)
- Positions: Left-back; left wing-back

Team information
- Current team: Rotherham United (on loan from Sheffield United)
- Number: 24

Youth career
- Crystal Palace

Senior career*
Years	Team	Apps	(Gls)
2021	Hornchurch	13	(2)
2021–	Sheffield United	1	(0)
2024	→ Motherwell (loan)	0	(0)
2024–2025	→ Rochdale (loan)	22	(0)
2025–2026	→ Forest Green Rovers (loan)	35	(7)
2026–	→ Rotherham United (loan)	2	(1)
- * Club domestic league appearances and goals as of 23:42, 23 August 2026 (UTC)

Jili Buyabu (born 9 August 2003) is an English professional footballer who plays as a left-back or left wing-back for EFL League Two club Rotherham United, on loan from EFL Championship club Sheffield United.

== Career ==
Buyabu began his career with Hornchurch in the Isthmian League in September 2021. After an impressive start with Hornchurch, he transferred to Sheffield United on 21 December 2021 signing a two-and-a-half-year contract. In December 2022, he started training with their senior side. He made his professional debut with Sheffield United as a substitute in a 2–1 win over Birmingham City on 8 May 2023.

He was loaned to Scottish Premiership club Motherwell on 1 February 2024. On 21 February 2024, Buyabu returned to his parent club Sheffield United from Motherwell for personal reasons.

On 12 October 2024, Buyabu joined National League side Rochdale on an initial one-month loan deal. On 7 November 2024, this was extended until the end of January 2025 and on 1 February, extended until the end of the season.

On 14 August 2025, Buyabu returned on loan to the National League, this time joining Forest Green Rovers on a season-long loan deal.

On 28 July 2026, Buyabu joined League Two club Rotherham United on a season-long loan for the 2026–27 season.

== Career statistics ==
As of match played 30 August 2023

Appearances and goals by club, season and competition
Club	Season	League			FA Cup		EFL Cup		Other		Total	
Club	Season	Division	Apps	Goals	Apps	Goals	Apps	Goals	Apps	Goals	Apps	Goals
Hornchurch	2021–22	IL Premier Division	13	2	3	1	—		1 (Note: Appearance in FA Trophy)	0	17	3
Sheffield United	2022–23	Championship	1	0	0	0	0	0	—		1	0
Sheffield United	2023–24	Premier League	0	0	0	0	1	0	—		1	0
Motherwell	2023-24	Scottish Premiership	0	0	0	0	0	0	1	0	1	0
Career total			14	2	3	1	1	0	2	0	20	3
