= Jayce Fitzgerald =

English association football player (born 2007)

Personal information
- Full name: Jayce John Fitzgerald
- Date of birth: 9 May 2007 (age 19)
- Place of birth: Salford, England
- Height: 5 ft 10 in (1.79 m)
- Position: Midfielder

Team information
- Current team: Rotherham United (on loan from Manchester United)
- Number: 15

Youth career
- –: Manchester United

Senior career*
Years	Team	Apps	(Gls)
2024–	Manchester United	0	(0)
2026–	→ Rotherham United (loan)	10	(0)

International career
2022	England U16	1	(0)
2023–	England U17	4	(0)
- * Club domestic league appearances and goals as of 00:15 (UTC) 1 June 2024

Jayce John Fitzgerald (born 9 May 2007) is an English professional footballer who plays as a midfielder for EFL League Two club Rotherham United, on loan from Premier League club Manchester United.

== Career ==
Fitzgerald grew up in Salford.

=== Manchester United ===
Fitzgerald joined the youth academy at Manchester United as a youngster.

He was included in the Manchester United first team substitutes for the EFL Cup tie on 30 October 2024 against Leicester City.

==== Loan to Rotherham United ====
On 31 August 2026, Fitzgerald joined EFL League Two side Rotherham United on a season-long loan.

== Career statistics ==
=== Club ===
As of match played 4 November 2025

Appearances and goals by club, season and competition
Club	Season	League			FA Cup		EFL Cup		Continental		Other		Total	
Club	Season	Division	Apps	Goals	Apps	Goals	Apps	Goals	Apps	Goals	Apps	Goals	Apps	Goals
Manchester United	2024–25	Premier League	0	0	0	0	0	0	0	0	0	0	0	0
Manchester United U21	2024–25	—			—		—		—		1 (Note: Appearance(s) in EFL Trophy)	0	1	0
Manchester United U21	2025–26	—			—		—		—		3	0	3	0
Manchester United U21	Total		—		—		—		—		4	0	4	0
Career total			0	0	0	0	0	0	0	0	4	0	4	0
