= 2018–19 Bristol City F.C. season =

Bristol City
2018–19 season
- Owner: Steve Lansdown
- Chairman: John Lansdown
- Head Coach: Lee Johnson
- Stadium: Ashton Gate
- Championship: 8th
- FA Cup: Fifth round (vs. Wolverhampton Wanderers)
- EFL Cup: First round (vs. Plymouth Argyle)
- Top goalscorer: League: Famara Diedhiou (12); All: Famara Diedhiou (12)
- Highest home attendance: 25,556
- Lowest home attendance: 9,865
- Average home league attendance: 21,080
- Biggest win: 3–0 v Queens Park Rangers (21 August 2018, League)
- Biggest defeat: 0–2 v Middlesbrough (18 August 2018, League)
Home colours	Away colours	Third colours

The 2018–19 season was Bristol City's 121st season as a professional football club and their fourth consecutive season back in the Championship. Along with competing in the Championship, the club will also participated in the FA Cup and EFL Cup. The season was a largely successful one for the club, with City finishing in 8th place, just four points outside the playoff positions and the club's highest finish in the Championship since a 4th place finish in the 2007–08 season.

== Statistics ==
As of 5 May 2019

No.	Pos	Nat	Player	Total		Championship		FA Cup		League Cup	
No.	Pos	Nat	Player	Apps	Goals	Apps	Goals	Apps	Goals	Apps	Goals
1	GK	(England) ENG	Frank Fielding	7	0	5+0	0	2+0	0	0+0	0
2	DF	(Italy) ITA	Eros Pisano	16	2	11+3	2	0+1	0	1+0	0
3	DF	(England) ENG	Jay Dasilva	30	0	20+7	0	2+0	0	1+0	0
4	DF	(England) ENG	Adam Webster	45	3	41+1	3	2+0	0	0+1	0
5	DF	(Australia) AUS	Bailey Wright	14	0	9+2	0	3+0	0	0+0	0
6	DF	(England) ENG	Nathan Baker	17	0	12+4	0	1+0	0	0+0	0
7	MF	(England) ENG	Korey Smith	6	0	3+2	0	0+0	0	1+0	0
8	MF	(England) ENG	Josh Brownhill	47	6	43+0	5	2+1	1	0+1	0
9	FW	(Senegal) SEN	Famara Diedhiou	41	13	32+6	13	2+1	0	0+0	0
10	FW	(England) ENG	Matty Taylor	35	4	10+22	4	0+2	0	1+0	0
11	MF	(Republic of Ireland) IRL	Callum O'Dowda	35	5	20+11	4	3+0	1	1+0	0
12	MF	(England) ENG	Liam Walsh	8	0	3+4	0	0+0	0	1+0	0
14	FW	(Austria) AUT	Andreas Weimann	44	10	38+4	10	0+1	0	0+1	0
15	MF	(Wales) WAL	Marley Watkins	17	2	5+11	2	0+0	0	1+0	0
16	MF	(England) ENG	Hakeeb Adelakun	5	0	3+2	0	0+0	0	0+0	0
17	DF	(England) ENG	Lloyd Kelly	33	1	25+6	1	0+1	0	1+0	0
18	FW	(England) ENG	Antoine Semenyo	3	0	1+2	0	0+0	0	0+0	0
19	MF	(Sweden) SWE	Niclas Eliasson	34	3	19+12	2	3+0	1	0+0	0
20	FW	(England) ENG	Jamie Paterson	42	5	30+10	5	1+1	0	0+0	0
21	MF	(England) ENG	Marlon Pack	46	2	44+0	2	1+1	0	0+0	0
22	DF	(Czech Republic) CZE	Tomáš Kalas	39	0	36+0	0	2+1	0	0+0	0
24	GK	(England) ENG	Max O'Leary	14	0	12+1	0	0+0	0	1+0	0
28	MF	(Wales) WAL	Joe Morrell	4	0	0+1	0	3+0	0	0+0	0
32	DF	(England) ENG	Jack Hunt	33	1	30+1	1	1+0	0	1+0	0
33	GK	(Finland) FIN	Niki Mäenpää	27	0	26+0	0	1+0	0	0+0	0
34	GK	(New Zealand) NZL	Stefan Marinovic	1	0	1+0	0	0+0	0	0+0	0
40	FW	(Sudan) SDN	Mo Eisa	6	0	0+5	0	0+0	0	1+0	0
45	MF	(England) ENG	Kasey Palmer	15	2	2+11	2	2+0	0	0+0	0
Players who left during the season:
3	DF	(England) ENG	Joe Bryan	2	0	1+0	0	1+0	0	0+0	0

=== Goals record ===
As of 5 May 2019

Rank	No.	Nat.	Po.	Name	Championship	FA Cup	League Cup	Total
1	9	(Senegal)	CF	Famara Diedhiou	13	0	0	13
2	14	(Austria)	CF	Andreas Weimann	10	0	0	10
3	8	(England)	CM	Josh Brownhill	5	1	0	6
4	11	(Republic of Ireland)	LM	Callum O'Dowda	4	1	0	5
5	10	(England)	CF	Matty Taylor	4	0	0	4
5	20	(England)	AM	Jamie Paterson	5	0	0	5
7	4	(England)	CB	Adam Webster	3	0	0	3
7	19	(Sweden)	RM	Niclas Eliasson	2	1	0	3
9	2	(Italy)	RB	Eros Pisano	2	0	0	2
9	15	(Wales)	RW	Marley Watkins	2	0	0	2
9	21	(England)	CM	Marlon Pack	2	0	0	2
9	45	(England)	CM/AM	Kasey Palmer	2	0	0	2
13	17	(England)	LB	Lloyd Kelly	1	0	0	1
13	32	(England)	RB	Jack Hunt	1	0	0	1
Own Goals					3	0	0	3
Total					59	3	0	62

=== Disciplinary record ===
As of 5 May 2019

Rank	No.	Nat.	Po.	Name	Championship			FA Cup			League Cup			Total		
Rank	No.	Nat.	Po.	Name	Booked	(yellow card) (yellow-red card)	Sent off (straight red)	Booked	(yellow card) (yellow-red card)	Sent off (straight red)	Booked	(yellow card) (yellow-red card)	Sent off (straight red)	Booked	(yellow card) (yellow-red card)	Sent off (straight red)
1	21	(England)	CM	Marlon Pack	12	0	0	1	0	0	0	0	0	13	0	0
2	32	(England)	RB	Jack Hunt	10	0	0	0	0	0	0	0	0	10	0	0
3	14	(Austria)	CF	Andreas Weimann	6	0	0	0	0	0	1	0	0	7	0	0
4	8	(England)	CM	Josh Brownhill	4	1	0	0	0	0	0	0	0	4	1	0
5	2	(Italy)	RB	Eros Pisano	5	0	0	0	0	0	0	0	0	5	0	0
5	17	(England)	LB	Lloyd Kelly	5	0	0	0	0	0	0	0	0	5	0	0
7	4	(England)	CB	Adam Webster	4	0	0	0	0	0	0	0	0	4	0	0
7	10	(England)	CF	Matty Taylor	4	0	0	0	0	0	0	0	0	4	0	0
7	15	(Wales)	RW	Marley Watkins	4	0	0	0	0	0	0	0	0	4	0	0
7	22	(Czech Republic)	CB	Tomáš Kalas	3	0	0	1	0	0	0	0	0	4	0	0
11	5	(Australia)	CB	Bailey Wright	2	0	0	1	0	0	0	0	0	3	0	0
11	9	(Senegal)	CF	Famara Diedhiou	3	0	0	0	0	0	0	0	0	3	0	0
13	11	(Republic of Ireland)	LM	Callum O'Dowda	2	0	0	0	0	0	0	0	0	2	0	0
13	18	(England)	CF	Antoine Semenyo	1	0	1	0	0	0	0	0	0	1	0	1
13	45	(England)	CM	Kasey Palmer	2	0	0	0	0	0	0	0	0	2	0	0
16	1	(England)	GK	Frank Fielding	1	0	0	0	0	0	0	0	0	1	0	0
16	3	(England)	LB	Jay Dasilva	1	0	0	0	0	0	0	0	0	1	0	0
16	12	(England)	CM	Liam Walsh	1	0	0	0	0	0	0	0	0	1	0	0
16	19	(Sweden)	RM	Niclas Eliasson	1	0	0	0	0	0	0	0	0	1	0	0
16	20	(England)	AM	Jamie Paterson	1	0	0	0	0	0	0	0	0	1	0	0
16	24	(England)	GK	Max O'Leary	1	0	0	0	0	0	0	0	0	1	0	0
Total					73	1	1	3	0	0	1	0	0	76	1	1

== Transfers ==
=== Transfers in ===
Date from	Position	Nationality	Name	From	Fee	Ref.
1 July 2018	RW	(Wales)	Marley Watkins	Norwich City	£1,000,000	
1 July 2018	CB	(England)	Adam Webster	Ipswich Town	Undisclosed	
2 July 2018	RW	(England)	Hakeeb Adelakun	Scunthorpe United	Free transfer	
3 July 2018	RW	(Austria)	Andreas Weimann	Derby County	Undisclosed	
6 July 2018	RB	(England)	Jack Hunt	Sheffield Wednesday	Undisclosed	
23 July 2018	CF	(Sudan)	Mohamed Eisa	Cheltenham Town	£1,500,000	
1 August 2018	GK	(Finland)	Niki Mäenpää	Brighton & Hove Albion	Free transfer	
7 March 2019	GK	(New Zealand)	Stefan Marinovic	(Canada) Vancouver Whitecaps FC	Free(Free Agent) Transfer	

=== Transfers out ===
Date from	Position	Nationality	Name	To	Fee	Ref.
1 July 2018	CF	(Sweden)	Gustav Engvall	(Belgium) KV Mechelen	Undisclosed	
1 July 2018	CB	(England)	Aden Flint	Middlesbrough	Undisclosed (Believed to be £7,000,000)	
1 July 2018	CF	(Cameroon)	Paul Garita	(Belgium) Charleroi	Released	
1 July 2018	LB	(England)	Scott Golbourne	Shrewsbury Town	Released	
1 July 2018	CB	(Iceland)	Hörður Björgvin Magnússon	(Russia) CSKA Moscow	Undisclosed	
1 July 2018	CM	(England)	Gary O'Neil	Bolton Wanderers	Released	
1 July 2018	AM	(England)	Bobby Reid	(Wales) Cardiff City	£10,000,000	
1 July 2018	GK	(England)	Luke Steele	Nottingham Forest	Released	
7 August 2018	CF	(Bosnia and Herzegovina)	Milan Đurić	(Italy) Salernitana	Undisclosed	
9 August 2018	LB	(England)	Joe Bryan	Fulham	£6,000,000	
9 November 2018	CB	(Poland)	Kacper Łopata	Brighton & Hove Albion	Undisclosed	
19 December 2018	CM	(Germany)	Jens Hegeler	Free agent	Mutual consent	
3 January 2019	CF	(England)	Shawn McCoulsky	Forest Green Rovers	Undisclosed	
18 May 2019	LB	(England)	Lloyd Kelly	A.F.C. Bournemouth	£13,000,000	

=== Loans in ===
Start date 2018	Position	Nationality	Name	From	End date	Ref.
9 August 2018	LB	(England)	Jay Dasilva	Chelsea	31 May 2019	
23 August 2018	CB	(Czech Republic)	Tomáš Kalas	Chelsea	31 May 2019	
9 January 2019	AM	(England)	Kasey Palmer	Chelsea	31 May 2019	

=== Loans out ===
Start date	Position	Nationality	Name	To	End date	Ref.
2 July 2018	RB	(England)	Zak Vyner	Rotherham United	31 May 2019	
10 July 2018	LM	(England)	Jonny Smith	Tranmere Rovers	31 May 2019	
17 July 2018	MF	(England)	George Dowling	Eastleigh	21 December 2018	
18 July 2018	CF	(England)	Antoine Semenyo	(Wales) Newport County	31 May 2019	
27 July 2018	CF	(England)	Freddie Hinds	(Wales) Wrexham	23 November 2018	
27 July 2018	WG	(England)	George Nurse	Weston-super-Mare	February 2019	
28 July 2018	CB	(England)	Harvey Smith	Hereford	31 May 2019	
30 July 2018	CM	(England)	Tyreeq Bakinson	(Wales) Newport County	31 May 2019	
3 August 2018	CB	(England)	Aden Baldwin	Cheltenham Town	1 January 2019	
10 August 2018	CB	(England)	Aaron Parsons	Weston-super-Mare	September 2018	
10 August 2018	CF	(England)	Shawn McCoulsky	Southend United	3 January 2019	
30 August 2018	LM	(England)	Jake Andrews	Torquay United	31 May 2019	
30 August 2018	RM	(England)	Opi Edwards	Torquay United	September 2018	
31 August 2018	RB	(England)	Taylor Moore	Southend United	31 May 2019	
31 August 2018	LB	(England)	Cameron Pring	(Wales) Newport County	January 2019	
13 September 2018	CF	(Northern Ireland)	Rory Holden	Barrow	October 2018	
21 September 2018	CF	(The Gambia)	Saikou Janneh	Torquay United	31 May 2019	
21 September 2018	GK	(Sierra Leone)	Alhaji Sesay	Dorchester Town	21 October 2018	
29 September 2018	MF	(Wales)	Connor Lemonheigh-Evans	Torquay United	31 May 2019	
14 November 2018	GK	(Sierra Leone)	Alhaji Sesay	Gloucester City	30 November 2018	
30 November 2018	GK	(England)	Joe Wollacott	Gloucester City	31 May 2019	
21 December 2018	CM	(England)	George Dowling	Weston-super-Mare	January 2019	
21 December 2018	CB	(England)	Aaron Parsons	Weston-super-Mare	January 2019	
3 January 2019	CF	(Northern Ireland)	Rory Holden	Rochdale	31 May 2019	
3 January 2019	LB	(England)	Cameron Pring	Cheltenham Town	31 May 2019	
4 January 2019	CF	(England)	Freddie Hinds	Bath City	February 2019	
6 February 2019	DF	(Wales)	Joe Low	Dorchester Town	Work experience	
29 March 2019	DF	(England)	Jack Spark	Gloucester City	31 May 2019	

== Competitions ==
=== Pre-season friendlies ===
The Robins revealed they would face Bitton, Cheltenham Town, Shrewsbury Town and Bournemouth.

8 July 2018 Friendly	Bitton	0–4	Bristol City	Bitton
14:00 BST		Report	Taylor 20'; Paterson 44'; Adelakun 56'; Holden 78'	Stadium: Recreation Ground

10 July 2018 Friendly	Bristol City	4–2	Cheltenham Town	Weston-super-Mare
19:30 BST	Taylor 5'; Eliasson 34', 37'; Webster 39'	Report	Mullins 43'; Dawes 62'	Stadium: Woodspring Stadium

14 July 2018 Friendly	Bristol City	1–1	Shrewsbury Town	Bristol
13:00 BST	O'Dowda 15'	Report	Payne 20'	Stadium: Ashton Gate

17 July 2018 Friendly	RB Linense	2–2	Bristol City	La Línea de la Concepción, Spain
20:00 CEST	Ahmed 76'; Carrasco 89'	Report	Diédhiou 31', 55'	Stadium: Estadio Municipal de La Línea de la Concepción

21 July 2018 Friendly	Rayo Vallecano	1–0	Bristol City	Marbella, Spain
20:00 CEST	Alex Moreno 90'	Report		Stadium: Marbella Football Centre

27 July 2018 Friendly	Bristol City	1–1	Bournemouth	Bristol
19:00 BST	Weimann 38'	Report	King 15'	Stadium: Ashton Gate

=== Championship ===
==== League table ====
Pos	Team	Pld	W	D	L	GF	GA	GD	Pts	Promotion, qualification or relegation
5	Aston Villa (O, P)	46	20	16	10	82	61	+21	76	Qualification for Championship play-offs (Note: Four teams play for one spot and promotion to the Premier League.)
6	Derby County	46	20	14	12	69	54	+15	74	Qualification for Championship play-offs
7	Middlesbrough	46	20	13	13	49	41	+8	73	
8	Bristol City	46	19	13	14	59	53	+6	70	
9	Nottingham Forest	46	17	15	14	61	54	+7	66	
10	Swansea City	46	18	11	17	65	62	+3	65	
11	Brentford	46	17	13	16	73	59	+14	64 (Note: Brentford were awarded a 1–0 win over Bolton due to Bolton's inability to hold the fixture.)	

Source: Sky Sports Archived 25 September 2019 at the Wayback Machine
Rules for classification: 1) Points; 2) Goal difference; 3) Number of goals scored; 4) Head-to-head results
(O) Play-off winners; (P) Promoted

==== Results by matchday ====
Matchday	1	2	3	4	5	6	7	8	9	10	11	12	13	14	15	16	17	18	19	20	21	22	23	24	25	26	27	28	29	30	31	32	33	34	35	36	37	38	39	40	41	42	43	44	45	46
Ground	H	A	H	A	A	H	H	A	A	H	A	H	A	H	H	A	H	A	A	H	A	H	A	H	H	A	H	A	H	A	H	A	H	A	H	H	A	A	H	H	A	H	A	H	A	A
Result	D	D	L	W	W	W	W	L	L	D	D	L	W	W	L	L	L	L	W	D	W	D	D	D	W	W	W	W	W	W	W	L	L	D	L	D	W	W	D	W	L	D	L	L	W	D
Position	13	14	19	11	9	6	3	5	8	8	10	13	10	8	11	12	13	14	14	14	13	14	13	12	11	11	7	7	6	6	5	6	6	6	7	6	7	5	6	5	6	7	8	8	8	8

Updated to match(es) played on 4 May 2019. Source: BBC Sport
A = Away; H = Home; W = Win; D = Draw; L = Loss

==== Result summary ====
Overall								Home						Away					
Pld	W	D	L	GF	GA	GD	Pts	W	D	L	GF	GA	GD	W	D	L	GF	GA	GD
46	19	13	14	59	53	+6	70	8	8	7	28	26	+2	11	5	7	31	27	+4

Last updated: 4 May 2019.
Source: BBC Sport

==== Matches ====
On 21 June 2018, the EFL Championship fixtures for the forthcoming season were announced.

4 August 2018 1	Bristol City	1–1	Nottingham Forest	Bristol
15:00 BST	Weimann 5'	Report	Murphy 46'	Stadium: Ashton Gate Stadium; Attendance: 22,395; Referee: Darren Bond

11 August 2018 2	Bolton Wanderers	2–2	Bristol City	Bolton
15:00 BST	Buckley 57'; Magennis 60'	Report	Weimann 64'; Paterson 81'	Stadium: University of Bolton Stadium; Attendance: 14,112; Referee: John Brooks

18 August 2018 3	Bristol City	0–2	Middlesbrough	Bristol
15:00 BST		Report	Braithwaite 13'; Assombalonga 32'	Stadium: Ashton Gate Stadium; Attendance: 19,455; Referee: Oliver Langford

21 August 2018 4	Queens Park Rangers	0–3	Bristol City	Shepherd's Bush
19:45 BST		Report	Taylor 41'; Weimann 50', 90'	Stadium: Loftus Road; Attendance: 11,739; Referee: Peter Bankes

25 August 2018 5	Swansea City	0–1	Bristol City	Swansea
15:00 BST		Report	Weimann 1'	Stadium: Liberty Stadium; Attendance: 20,522; Referee: Gavin Ward

2 September 2018 6	Bristol City	4–1	Blackburn Rovers	Bristol
13:30 BST	Brownhill 38'; Watkins 55'; Diédhiou 73'; Pack 82'	Report	Mulgrew 13'	Stadium: Ashton Gate Stadium; Attendance: 19,769; Referee: David Webb

15 September 2018 7	Bristol City	1–0	Sheffield United	Bristol
15:00 BST	Watkins 81'	Report		Stadium: Ashton Gate Stadium; Attendance: 20,540; Referee: John Brooks

18 September 2018 8	West Bromwich Albion	4–2	Bristol City	West Bromwich
19:45 BST	Rodriguez 16' (pen.), 28'; Gayle 24'; Barnes 63'	Report	Kelly 60'; Diédhiou 68'	Stadium: The Hawthorns; Attendance: 22,051; Referee: Jeremy Simpson

21 September 2018 9	Wigan Athletic	1–0	Bristol City	Wigan
19:45 BST	Powell 52'	Report		Stadium: DW Stadium; Attendance: 10,192; Referee: Oliver Langford

28 September 2018 10	Bristol City	1–1	Aston Villa	Bristol
20:00 BST	Brownhill 16'	Report	Bjarnason 45+3'	Stadium: Ashton Gate Stadium; Attendance: 21,224; Referee: Tim Robinson

3 October 2018 11	Rotherham United	0–0	Bristol City	Rotherham
19:45 BST		Report		Stadium: New York Stadium; Attendance: 8,187; Referee: Gavin Ward

7 October 2018 12	Bristol City	1–2	Sheffield Wednesday	Bristol
13:30 BST	Taylor 80' (pen.)	Report	João 64', 66'	Stadium: Ashton Gate Stadium; Attendance: 20,102; Referee: Andy Davies

20 October 2018 13	Brentford	0–1	Bristol City	Brentford
15:00 BST	Mepham (yellow card) 50', (yellow card) 58' (red card); Yennaris (yellow card) 82'; Sawyers (yellow card) 84'; Maupay (yellow card) 90'	Report	Weimann (yellow card) 45'; Pack (yellow card) 50'; Kelly (yellow card) 65'; Eliasson 89'	Stadium: Griffin Park; Attendance: 11,182; Referee: Robert Jones

24 October 2018 14	Bristol City	1–0	Hull City	Bristol
19:45 BST	Diédhiou 90+3'	Report		Stadium: Ashton Gate Stadium; Attendance: 19,149; Referee: Peter Bankes

27 October 2018 15	Bristol City	0–1	Stoke City	Bristol
15:00 BST		Report	Fletcher 33'	Stadium: Ashton Gate Stadium; Attendance: 22,456; Referee: Andrew Madley

3 November 2018 16	Reading	3–2	Bristol City	Reading
15:00 GMT	Méïté 8'; Kelly 45+1'; Bacuna (yellow card) 59', (goal) 66'; Rinomhota (yellow card) 69'; Yiadom (yellow card) 87'; Baldock (yellow card) 90+1'; Gunter (yellow card) 90+6'	Report	Pack 23'; Brownhill 45+3'; Walsh (yellow card) 59'; Weimann (yellow card) 84'	Stadium: Madejski Stadium; Attendance: 14,455; Referee: James Linington

10 November 2018 17	Bristol City	0–1	Preston North End	Bristol
15:00 GMT	Hunt (yellow card) 88'	Report	Robinson 35'; Johnson (yellow card) 75'; Earl (yellow card) 79'	Stadium: Ashton Gate Stadium; Attendance: 19,797; Referee: Geoff Eltringham

24 November 2018 18	Leeds United	2–0	Bristol City	Leeds
19:45 BST	Alioski (yellow card) 27'; Roofe 69'; Hernández 86'	Report	Brownhill (yellow card) 11' (yellow-red card) 55'	Stadium: Elland Road; Attendance: 34,333; Referee: Scott Duncan

28 November 2018 19	Ipswich Town	2–3	Bristol City	Ipswich
19:45 GMT	Sears 32', 58'	Report	Białkowski 55' (o.g.); Paterson 59'; Diédhiou 64'	Stadium: Portman Road; Attendance: 13,726; Referee: David Webb

2 December 2018 20	Bristol City	1–1	Millwall	Bristol
13:30 GMT	Cooper 52' (o.g.)	Report	Williams 78'	Stadium: Ashton Gate Stadium; Attendance: 18,814; Referee: Darren England

8 December 2018 21	Birmingham City	0–1	Bristol City	Birmingham
15:00 GMT		Report	Diédhiou 63'	Stadium: St Andrew's; Attendance: 20,961; Referee: John Brooks

15 December 2018 22	Bristol City	2–2	Norwich City	Bristol
17:30 GMT	Diédhiou 45'; O'Dowda 53'	Report	Stiepermann 39'; Aarons 78'	Stadium: Ashton Gate; Attendance: 19,851; Referee: Roger East

22 December 2018 23	Derby County	1–1	Bristol City	Derby
15:00 GMT	Waghorn 37'	Report	Paterson 24'; Pisano (yellow card) 90+4'	Stadium: Pride Park; Attendance: 26,719; Referee: Darren Bond

26 December 2018 24	Bristol City	1–1	Brentford	Bristol
15:00 GMT	Pisano 20'	Report	Maupay (yellow card) 26', (goal) 53'	Stadium: Ashton Gate Stadium; Attendance: 21,207; Referee: David Webb

29 December 2018 25	Bristol City	1–0	Rotherham United	Bristol
15:00 GMT	Hunt (yellow card) 44'; Dasilva (yellow card) 71'; Webster 86'	Report	Jones (yellow card) 51' (yellow-red card) 64'; Towell (red card) 72'; Manning (yellow card) 90+5'	Stadium: Ashton Gate Stadium; Attendance: 21,207; Referee: Scott Duncan

1 January 2019 26	Stoke City	0–2	Bristol City	Stoke
15:00 GMT	Woods (yellow card) 45'; Martina (yellow card) 62'; Williams (yellow card) 90+2'	Report	Diédhiou 39'; O'Dowda 81'; Pack (yellow card) 45'	Stadium: bet365 Stadium; Attendance: 23,912; Referee: Paul Tierney

12 January 2019 27	Bristol City	2–1	Bolton Wanderers	Bristol
15:00 GMT	Taylor 64'; Palmer 66'	Report	Magennis (yellow card) 44'; Buckley 58'; Lowe (yellow card) 69'	Stadium: Ashton Gate Stadium; Attendance: 19,730; Referee: Steve Martin

19 January 2019 28	Nottingham Forest	0–1	Bristol City	Nottingham
15:00 GMT	Benalouane (yellow card) 45'; Janko (yellow card) 88'	Report	Diédhiou 70'	Stadium: City Ground; Attendance: 28,922; Referee: Jeremy Simpson

2 February 2019 29	Bristol City	2–0	Swansea City	Bristol
15:00 GMT	Weimann 46'; O'Dowda 74'	Report	Byers (yellow card) 63'	Stadium: Ashton Gate Stadium; Attendance: 23,560; Referee: Andy Woolmer

9 February 2019 30	Blackburn Rovers	0–1	Bristol City	Blackburn
15:00 GMT	Travis (yellow card) 25'	Report	Wright (yellow card) 37'; Brownhill (yellow card) 75'; Pisano 80'; Fielding (yellow card) 90+3'	Stadium: Ewood Park; Attendance: 13,593; Referee: James Linington

12 February 2019 31	Bristol City	2–1	Queens Park Rangers	Bristol
19:45 GMT	Pack (yellow card) 62'; Pisano (yellow card) 69'; Eliasson 73'; Diédhiou 90+3' (pen.)	Report	Smith 45'; Hall (yellow card) 90+1'; Leistner (yellow card) 90+2'; Bidwell (yellow card) 90+7'	Stadium: Ashton Gate Stadium; Attendance: 19,183; Referee: Tony Harrington

23 February 2019 32	Norwich City	3–2	Bristol City	Norwich
15:00 GMT	McLean 36', 66'; Godfrey 55'; Trybull (yellow card) 70'	Report	Paterson 12'; O'Dowda 37'; Kalas (yellow card) 38'; Watkins (yellow card) 90+5'; Palmer (yellow card) 90+6'	Stadium: Carrow Road; Attendance: 26,338; Referee: Gavin Ward

26 February 2019 33	Bristol City	1–2	Birmingham City	Bristol
19:45 GMT	Pack (yellow card) 29'; Diédhiou (yellow card) 46' (goal) 66'; Pisano (yellow card) 58'	Report	Mahoney 42'; Morrison 47'; Jota (yellow card) 85'; Colin (yellow card) 90+6'	Stadium: Ashton Gate Stadium; Attendance: 19,777; Referee: Geoff Eltringham

2 March 2019 34	Preston North End	1–1	Bristol City	Preston
15:00 GMT	Johnson 42'	Report	Kelly (yellow card) 41'; O'Dowda (yellow card) 50'; Diédhiou 69'; Pack (yellow card) 84'	Stadium: Deepdale; Attendance: 12,863; Referee: Jeremy Simpson

9 March 2019 35	Bristol City	0–1	Leeds United	Bristol
15:00 GMT	Semenyo (yellow card) 34'; Wright (yellow card) 61'; Diédhiou (yellow card) 81'; Webster (yellow card) 87'	Report	Bamford 9'; Cooper (yellow card) 19'; Ayling (yellow card) 80'; Alioski (yellow card) 88'; Douglas (yellow card) 90'	Stadium: Ashton Gate Stadium; Attendance: 24,832; Referee: Peter Bankes

12 March 2019 36	Bristol City	1–1	Ipswich Town	Bristol
19:45 GMT	Webster 32'; Hunt (yellow card) 90'	Report	Dozzell (yellow card) 30'; Kelly 68' (o.g.); Edwards (yellow card) 76'; El Mizouni (yellow card) 83'	Stadium: Ashton Gate Stadium; Attendance: 18,411; Referee: Darren Bond

30 March 2019 37	Sheffield United	2–3	Bristol City	Sheffield
15:00 GMT	Sharp 6'; Norwood (yellow card) 66'; Hogan 71'	Report	Hunt (yellow card) 15'; Pack (yellow card) 24'; Weimann 30', 77', 83' (yellow card) 79'; Palmer (yellow card) 88'	Stadium: Bramall Lane; Attendance: 30,030; Referee: James Linington

2 April 2019 38	Middlesbrough	0–1	Bristol City	Middlesbrough
19:45 BST	Saville (yellow card) 66'	Report	Webster 31' (yellow card) 49'; Pack (yellow card) 66'; Hunt (yellow card) 86'	Stadium: Riverside Stadium; Attendance: 21,016; Referee: Gavin Ward

6 April 2019 39	Bristol City	2–2	Wigan Athletic	Bristol
15:00 BST	Webster (yellow card) 32'; Taylor 65'; Palmer 68'	Report	James 37'; Fox (yellow card) 40'; Byrne 90+3'	Stadium: Ashton Gate Stadium; Attendance: 20,931; Referee: Keith Stroud

9 April 2019 40	Bristol City	3–2	West Bromwich Albion	Bristol
19:45 BST	Brownhill 2'; Hunt (yellow card) 13' (goal) 19'; Weimann 16'; Taylor (yellow card) 90+4'	Report	Gayle 47'; Holgate (yellow card) 70'; Rodriguez 74'	Stadium: Ashton Gate Stadium; Attendance: 20,581; Referee: Simon Hooper

13 April 2019 41	Aston Villa	2–1	Bristol City	Aston
15:00 GMT	McGinn (yellow card) 20'; Abraham 55' (pen.); Hourihane 66'	Report	Pack (yellow card) 19'; Taylor (yellow card) 21'; Hunt (yellow card) 44'; Weimann (yellow card) 54'; O'Leary (yellow card) 55'; Diédhiou 74'; Webster (yellow card) 87'	Stadium: Villa Park; Attendance: 41,418; Referee: Scott Duncan

19 April 2019 42	Bristol City	1–1	Reading	Bristol
12:30 BST	Brownhill 72'	Report	Méïté 48'	Stadium: Ashton Gate Stadium; Attendance: 23,309; Referee: Oliver Langford

22 April 2019 43	Sheffield Wednesday	2–0	Bristol City	Owlerton
15:00 BST	Bannan 17'; João 39' (yellow card) 69'	Report	Diédhiou (yellow card) 25'; Weimann (yellow card) 78'	Stadium: Hillsborough Stadium; Attendance: 23,998; Referee: Robert Jones

27 April 2019 44	Bristol City	0–2	Derby County	Bristol
15:00 BST	Semenyo (red card) 59'	Report	Lawrence 18' (yellow card) 63'; Bogle (yellow card) 21' (goal) 77'; Mount (yellow card) 29'; Bennett (yellow card) 90+3'	Stadium: Ashton Gate Stadium; Attendance: 25,556; Referee: Darren Bond

30 April 2019 45	Millwall	1–2	Bristol City	Bermondsey
19:45 BST	Gregory 41'; Williams (penalty missed) 73'	Report	Brownhill (yellow card) 24'; Walsh (yellow card) 45+2'; Palmer (yellow card) 58'; Paterson 76'; Diédhiou 81'	Stadium: The Den; Attendance: 12,261; Referee: Andrew Madley

5 May 2019 46	Hull City	1–1	Bristol City	Kingston upon Hull
12:30 BST	Irvine 55'; Stewart (yellow card) 78'; Henriksen (yellow card) 90+1'	Report	Kalas (yellow card) 17'; Pack (yellow card) 29'; Henriksen 90' (o.g.)	Stadium: KCOM Stadium; Attendance: 12,165; Referee: John Brooks

=== FA Cup ===
The third round draw was made live on BBC One by Ruud Gullit and Paul Ince from Stamford Bridge on 3 December 2018. The fourth round draw was made live on BBC One by Robbie Keane and Carl Ikeme from Wolverhampton on 7 January 2019. The fifth round draw was broadcast on 28 January 2019 live on BBC One, Alex Scott and Ian Wright conducted the draw.

5 January 2019 Third round	Bristol City	1–0	Huddersfield Town	Bristol
17:30 GMT	Brownhill 72'	Report		Stadium: Ashton Gate Stadium; Referee: Peter Bankes

25 January 2019 Fourth round	Bristol City	2–1	Bolton Wanderers	Bristol
19:45 GMT	O'Dowda 8'; Eliasson 30'; Pack (yellow card) 66'	Report	Beevers 6'; Noone (yellow card) 63'; Murphy (yellow card) 69'; Ameobi (yellow card) 87'	Stadium: Ashton Gate Stadium; Referee: Stuart Attwell

17 February 2019 Fifth round	Bristol City	0–1	Wolverhampton Wanderers	Bristol
13:00 GMT	Wright (yellow card) 52'; Kalas (yellow card) 75'	Report	Cavaleiro 28'; Moutinho (yellow card) 83'; Gibbs-White (yellow card) 86'	Stadium: Ashton Gate Stadium; Attendance: 24,394; Referee: Martin Atkinson

=== EFL Cup ===
On 15 June 2018, the draw for the first round was made in Vietnam.

14 August 2018 First round	Bristol City	0–1	Plymouth Argyle	Bristol
19:45 BST		Report	Songo'o 27'	Stadium: Ashton Gate Stadium; Attendance: 9,865; Referee: Kevin Johnson
