= Tyreeq Bakinson =

English footballer (born 1998)

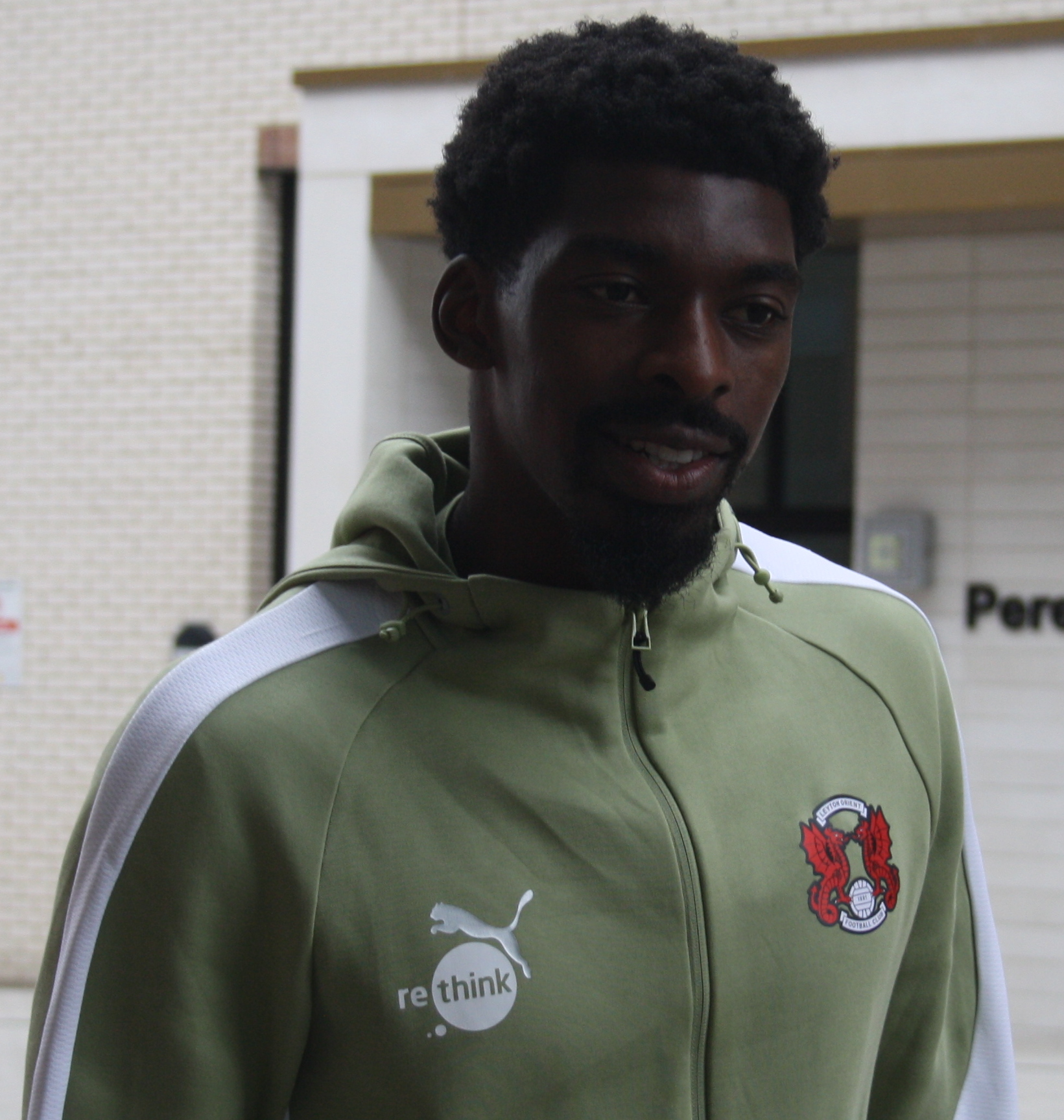
- Bakinson in 2025

Personal information
- Full name: Tyreeq Jamal Adeshina Oliveira Bakinson
- Date of birth: 10 October 1998 (age 28)
- Place of birth: Camden, England
- Height: 6 ft 3 in (1.91 m)
- Position: Midfielder

Team information
- Current team: Plymouth Argyle (on loan from Leyton Orient)
- Number: 19

Youth career
- –2016: Luton Town

Senior career*
Years	Team	Apps	(Gls)
2016–2017	Luton Town	1	(0)
2017–2022	Bristol City	47	(5)
2018–2019	→ Newport County (loan)	30	(1)
2020	→ Plymouth Argyle (loan)	14	(2)
2022	→ Ipswich Town (loan)	17	(2)
2022–2024	Sheffield Wednesday	34	(1)
2024	→ Charlton Athletic (loan)	15	(1)
2024–2025	Wycombe Wanderers	25	(0)
2025–	Leyton Orient	38	(2)
2026–	→ Plymouth Argyle (loan)	10	(0)
- * Club domestic league appearances and goals as of 17:02, 24 October 2026 (UTC)

Tyreeq Jamal Adeshina Oliveira Bakinson (born 10 October 1998) is an English professional footballer who plays as a midfielder for EFL League One club Plymouth Argyle, on loan from fellow EFL League One club Leyton Orient.

== Career ==
=== Luton Town ===
Born in Camden, Greater London, Bakinson joined Luton Town as an under-10 and progressed through the club's youth system, before signing a three-and-a-half-year professional contract on 7 March 2016. He was a member of the under-18 team that won the Youth Alliance South East title and the Youth Alliance Cup in 2015–16, and also reached the quarter-finals of the FA Youth Cup, in which they lost 1–0 to Blackburn Rovers. Bakinson made his professional debut on the final day of 2015–16 as a 76th-minute substitute for Pelly Ruddock Mpanzu in a 4–1 win at home to Exeter City.

Bakinson was named in the starting lineup for the first time to make his first appearance of 2016–17 in a 2–1 win away to Gillingham in the EFL Trophy on 30 August 2016.

=== Bristol City ===
On 31 August 2017, Bakinson signed for Championship club Bristol City on a three-year contract, with the option of a one-year extension, for an undisclosed fee. He made his debut as an 80th-minute substitute in a 4–1 win over Premier League team Crystal Palace in the EFL Cup fourth round on 24 October 2017.

Bakinson joined League Two club Newport County on 30 July 2018 on a six-month loan. He made his debut for Newport on 14 August in a 4–1 away win over Cambridge United in the EFL Cup first round and scored his first goal on 8 September in a 1–0 win away to Oldham Athletic. He was introduced as an extra-time substitute in the 2019 League Two play-off final at Wembley Stadium on 25 May 2019, as Newport lost 1–0 to Tranmere Rovers.

He was loaned to another League Two club, Plymouth Argyle, on 3 January 2020 until the end of the 2019–20 season. Bakinson scored his first goal for Plymouth on 1 February in a 1–0 home win over his former loan club Newport County.

His first goal for Bristol City was the team's second goal in a 2–2 away draw with Barnsley on 17 October 2020.

On 20 January 2022, Bakinson joined League One club Ipswich Town on loan until the end of the season with the club having the option to make the deal permanent.

=== Sheffield Wednesday ===
On 21 July 2022, he joined EFL League One club Sheffield Wednesday for an undisclosed fee. He made his debut against Milton Keynes Dons on the 6 August 2022, replacing Josh Windass on the 77th minute. His first goal for the club came the following week, with a late winner against Charlton Athletic. On 17 May 2024, it was confirmed he would be released following the expiration of his contract.

==== Charlton Athletic (loan) ====
On 5 January 2024, Bakinson was loaned to Charlton Athletic for the rest of the season.

On 17 May 2024, Sheffield Wednesday announced the player would leave in the summer when his contract expired.

=== Wycombe Wanderers ===
On 1 July 2024, Bakinson signed for League One side Wycombe Wanderers.

=== Leyton Orient ===
On 11 July 2025, Bakinson signed for League One side Leyton Orient, signing a three-year contract for an undisclosed fee.

== Career statistics ==
As of match played 24 October 2026

Appearances and goals by club, season and competition
Club	Season	League			FA Cup		EFL Cup		Other		Total	
Club	Season	Division	Apps	Goals	Apps	Goals	Apps	Goals	Apps	Goals	Apps	Goals
Luton Town	2015–16	League Two	1	0	0	0	0	0	—		1	0
Luton Town	2016–17	League Two	0	0	0	0	0	0	4 (Note: Appearance(s) in EFL Trophy)	0	4	0
Luton Town	2017–18	League Two	0	0	—		0	0	1	0	1	0
Luton Town	Total		1	0	0	0	0	0	5	0	6	0
Bristol City	2017–18	Championship	0	0	0	0	1	0	—		1	0
Bristol City	2018–19	Championship	0	0	—		—		—		0	0
Bristol City	2019–20	Championship	0	0	0	0	0	0	—		0	0
Bristol City	2020–21	Championship	34	4	2	0	3	0	—		39	4
Bristol City	2021–22	Championship	13	1	0	0	1	0	—		14	1
Bristol City	Total		47	5	2	0	5	0	—		54	5
Newport County (loan)	2018–19	League Two	30	1	7	0	2	0	3 (Note: Two appearances in EFL Trophy, one in League Two play-offs)	0	42	1
Plymouth Argyle (loan)	2019–20	League Two	14	2	—		—		—		14	2
Ipswich Town (loan)	2021–22	League One	17	2	0	0	0	0	—		17	2
Sheffield Wednesday	2022–23	League One	26	1	3	0	2	0	1	0	32	1
Sheffield Wednesday	2023–24	Championship	8	0	0	0	2	1	—		10	1
Sheffield Wednesday	Total		34	1	3	0	4	1	1	0	42	2
Charlton Athletic (loan)	2023–24	League One	15	1	—		—		—		15	1
Wycombe Wanderers	2024–25	League One	25	0	4	0	3	0	2	0	34	0
Leyton Orient	2025–26	League One	38	2	1	0	1	0	3	0	43	2
Plymouth Argyle	2026–27	League One	10	0	0	0	1	0	2	1	13	1
Career total			231	14	17	0	16	1	16	1	280	16
