= Killian Cahill =

Irish footballer (born 2003)

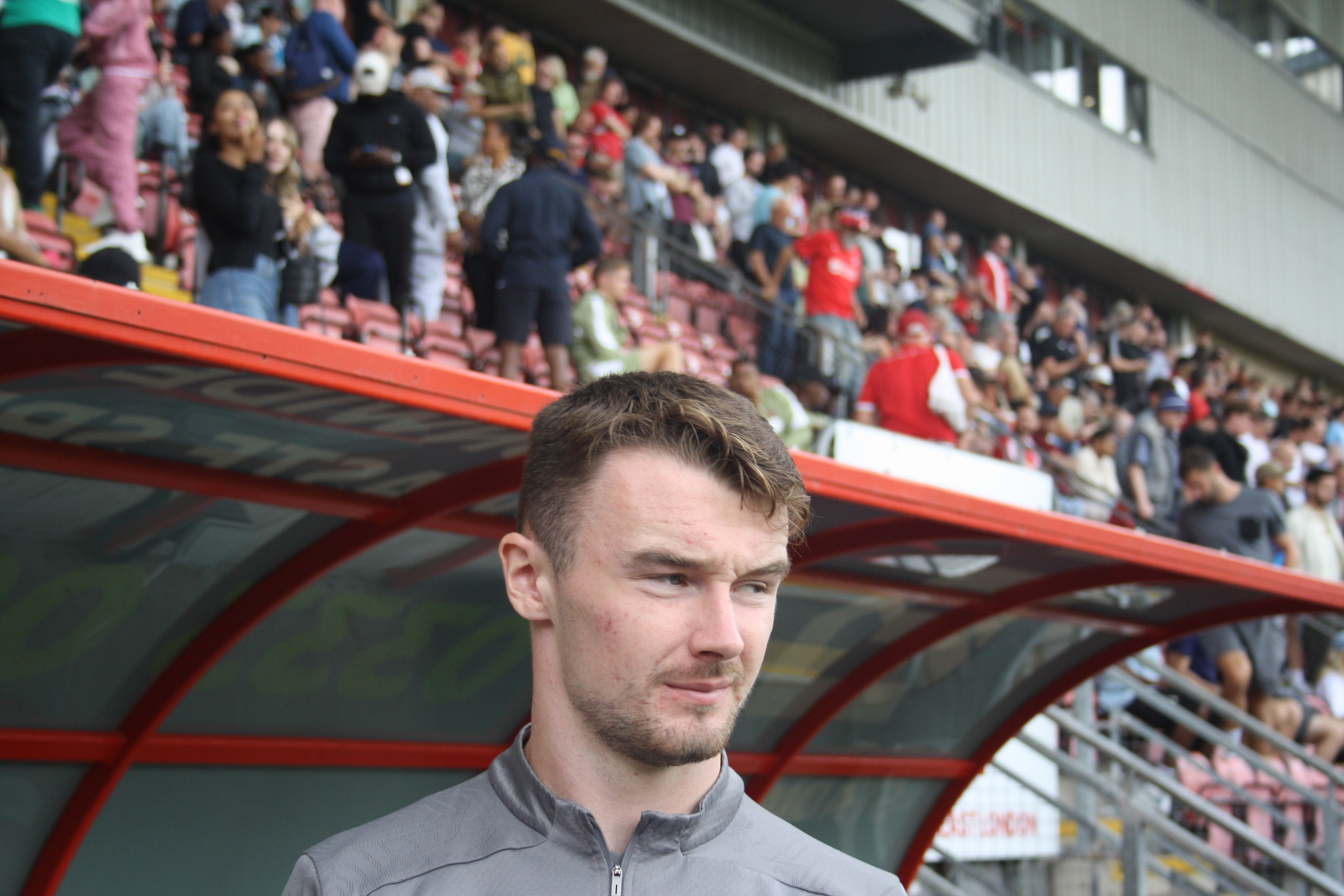
- Cahill in 2025

Personal information
- Full name: Killian Cahill
- Date of birth: 3 November 2003 (age 22)
- Place of birth: Skryne, Republic of Ireland
- Height: 1.90 m (6 ft 3 in)
- Position: Goalkeeper

Team information
- Current team: Leyton Orient
- Number: 33

Youth career
- –2022: Shamrock Rovers
- 2022–2025: Brighton & Hove Albion

Senior career*
Years	Team	Apps	(Gls)
2025–	Leyton Orient	16	(0)

International career
2023–2024	Republic of Ireland U21	2	(0)
- * Club domestic league appearances and goals as of 31 January 2026 (UTC)

Killian Cahill (born 3 November 2003) is an Irish professional footballer who plays as a goalkeeper for EFL League One club Leyton Orient. He is a former Republic of Ireland under-21 international.

== Early life ==
From Skryne in County Meath, he attended St Patrick's Classical School in Navan until he received a scholarship to Ashfield College, Dublin.

== Club career ==
Cahill played for Skryne Tara AFC and went on to the Shamrock Rovers Academy from the age of 12 years-old. He was part of the Under-19 League of Ireland Championship winning team in 2021. He joined the Brighton & Hove Albion academy from Shamrock Rovers in 2022, and appeared as an unused substitute for Brighton in the Premier League during the 2024–25 season. He also featured in the EFL Trophy for the Brighton U21 side that season.

Cahill joined Leyton Orient of EFL League One from Brighton in June 2025 on a two-year contract. He made his debut for Leyton Orient on 12 August 2025 in a 1–0 defeat at home to Wycombe Wanderers in the EFL Cup.

== International career ==
Cahill is a former Republic of Ireland under-21 international, earning 2 caps between 2023 and 2024. On 5 May 2026, Cahill was called up to the Republic of Ireland senior team for a friendly against Grenada in Murcia, Spain.

== Personal life ==
He is the son of Irish national record holder and international long jumper, Terri Hogan, who competed at the 1993 World Athletics Championships and Olympic hurdler Sean Cahill, who competed at the 1996 Olympic Games. He has siblings Niamh and Ciaran.

== Career statistics ==
As of match played on 8 November 2025

Appearances and goals by club, season and competition
Club	Season	League			FA Cup		EFL Cup		Other		Total	
Club	Season	Division	Apps	Goals	Apps	Goals	Apps	Goals	Apps	Goals	Apps	Goals
Brighton & Hove Albion U21	2024–25	—	—		—		—		5 (Note: 3 appearances in EFL Trophy and 2 appearances in National League Cup)	0	5	0
Leyton Orient	2025–26	EFL League One	5	0	1	0	1	0	2 (Note: Appearances in EFL Trophy)	0	9	0
Career total			5	0	1	0	1	0	7	0	14	0
