= Will Dennis =

English footballer (born 2000)

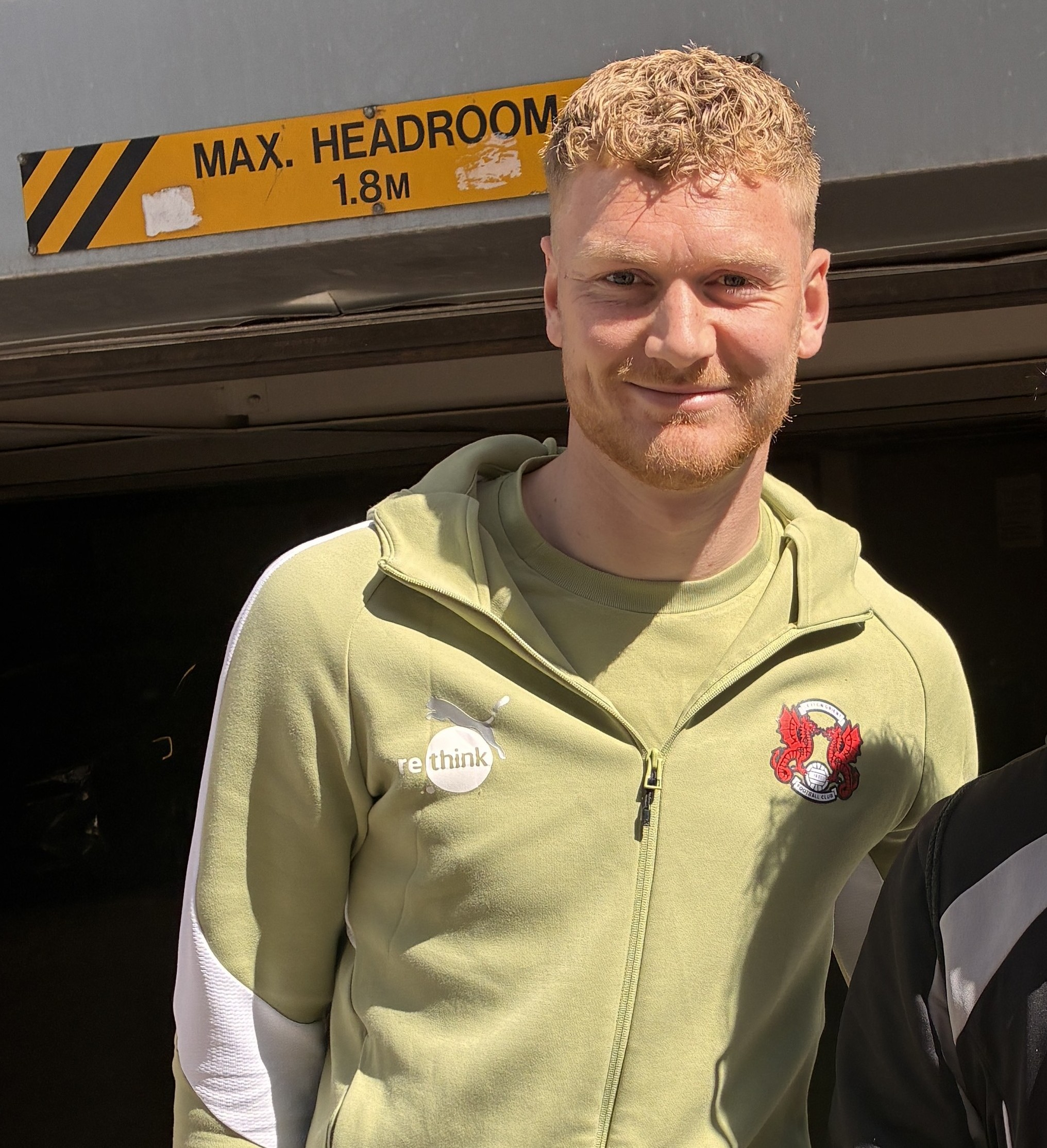
- Dennis in 2026

Personal information
- Full name: William Jonathon Dennis
- Date of birth: 10 July 2000 (age 26)
- Place of birth: Bedford, England
- Height: 1.88 m (6 ft 2 in)
- Position: Goalkeeper

Team information
- Current team: Milton Keynes Dons
- Number: 23

Youth career
- Luton Town
- –2016: Watford
- 2016–2017: Bournemouth

Senior career*
Years	Team	Apps	(Gls)
2017–2026	Bournemouth	0	(0)
2017	→ Guernsey (loan)	13	(0)
2018	→ Weymouth (loan)	20	(0)
2021	→ Wealdstone (loan)	1	(0)
2023	→ Slough Town (loan)	21	(0)
2023–2024	→ Kilmarnock (loan)	36	(0)
2026	→ Leyton Orient (loan)	15	(0)
2026–	Milton Keynes Dons	10	(0)
- * Club domestic league appearances and goals as of 12:09, 22 November 2026 (UTC)

William Jonathon Dennis (born 10 July 2000) is an English professional footballer who plays as a goalkeeper for EFL League One club Milton Keynes Dons.

== Career ==
=== Early career ===
Dennis started his career in the academy of Luton Town before moving to join the Watford academy, where he played from under-9s up to under-16s. After being released by Watford, Dennis had trials with Milton Keynes Dons, Coventry City and Stevenage.

=== AFC Bournemouth ===
Dennis joined Bournemouth at the age of 15 in 2016, turning professional 18 months later and joining the first-team at the start of the 2019–20 season. He also had spells in non-league with Guernsey and Weymouth during the 2017–18 season.

In March 2020 he signed a new three-and-a-half-year contract with the club. Later that month he was praised by manager Eddie Howe.

On 11 December 2021, Dennis signed for Wealdstone on an emergency loan. He made his debut on the same day, in a 1–0 defeat to Halifax On 18 December 2021, Dennis was recalled from his loan spell by parent club Bournemouth.

In January 2023, Dennis joined National League South club Slough Town on loan for the remainder of the season.

In June 2023 he signed on loan for Kilmarnock for the season.

In February 2026 he moved on loan to Leyton Orient.

=== Milton Keynes Dons ===
On 26 August 2026, Dennis joined League One club Milton Keynes Dons on a permanent deal, signing a three-year contract for an undisclosed fee.

== Career statistics ==
As of 21 November 2026

Appearances and goals by club, season and competition
Club	Season	League			National cup		League cup		Other		Total	
Club	Season	Division	Apps	Goals	Apps	Goals	Apps	Goals	Apps	Goals	Apps	Goals
AFC Bournemouth	2017–18	Premier League	0	0	0	0	0	0	—		0	0
AFC Bournemouth	2018–19	Premier League	0	0	0	0	0	0	—		0	0
AFC Bournemouth	2019–20	Premier League	0	0	0	0	0	0	—		0	0
AFC Bournemouth	2020–21	Championship	0	0	1	0	0	0	—		1	0
AFC Bournemouth	2021–22	Championship	0	0	0	0	0	0	—		0	0
AFC Bournemouth	2022–23	Championship	0	0	0	0	0	0	—		0	0
AFC Bournemouth	2023–24	Premier League	0	0	0	0	0	0	—		0	0
AFC Bournemouth	2024–25	Premier League	0	0	0	0	0	0	—		0	0
AFC Bournemouth	2025–26	Premier League	0	0	0	0	0	0	—		0	0
AFC Bournemouth	Total		0	0	1	0	0	0	0	0	1	0
Guernsey (loan)	2017–18	IL South Division	13	0	0	0	—		0	0	13	0
Weymouth (loan)	2017–18	SL Premier Division	20	0	0	0	—		2 (Note: One appearance in Southern League Cup, one appearance in Southern League Premier Division play-offs)	0	22	0
Wealdstone (loan)	2021–22	National League	1	0	—		—		—		1	0
Slough Town (loan)	2022–23	National League	21	0	—		—		—		21	0
Kilmarnock (loan)	2023–24	Scottish Premiership	36	0	2	0	6	0	—		44	0
Leyton Orient (loan)	2025–26	League One	15	0	—		—		—		15	0
Milton Keynes Dons	2026–27	League One	10	0	0	0	0	0	3 (Note: Appearances in the EFL Trophy)	0	13	0
Career total			116	0	3	0	6	0	5	0	130	0
