= Kaelan Casey =

English footballer (born 2004)

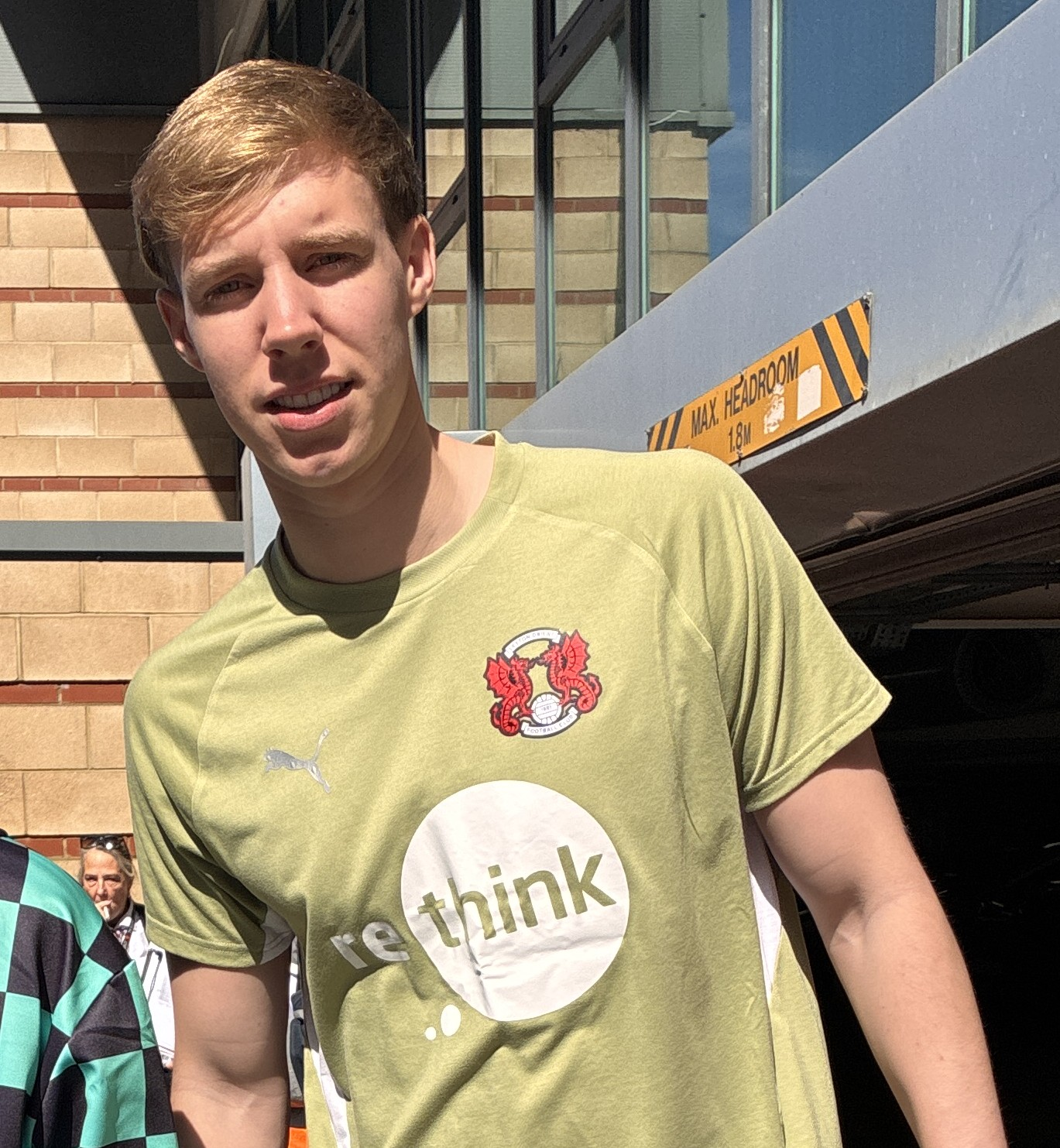
- Casey in 2026

Personal information
- Full name: Kaelan Michael Casey
- Date of birth: 28 October 2004 (age 22)
- Place of birth: Brentwood, England
- Height: 1.85 m (6 ft 1 in)
- Position: Defender

Team information
- Current team: Stevenage (on loan from West Ham United)

Youth career
- 2009–2022: West Ham United

Senior career*
Years	Team	Apps	(Gls)
2022–	West Ham United	2	(0)
2025–2026	→ Swansea City (loan)	8	(0)
2026	→ Leyton Orient (loan)	16	(0)
2026–	→ Stevenage (loan)	2	(0)

International career^{‡}
2024–2025	England U20	8	(0)
- * Club domestic league appearances and goals as of 4 November 2026 (UTC) ‡ National team caps and goals as of 19:12, 24 March 2025 (UTC)

Kaelan Michael Casey (born 28 October 2004) is an English professional footballer who plays as a defender for EFL League One club Stevenage, on loan from West Ham United.

== Club career ==
Growing up in Thurrock, Casey joined West Ham's football academy when he was five years-old. In the 2020–21 season, Casey made his debut appearances for the under-18s and played for West Ham in the EFL Trophy. By September 2022, Casey was playing regularly at the under-21 level with West Ham. On 31 May 2022 Casey had signed a professional contract with the club. Casey made his senior debut for West Ham United on 3 November 2022 in the UEFA Europa Conference League against FCSB, appearing as a second-half substitute for Ben Johnson, in a 3–0 West Ham win. Casey was a member of the team which won the 2023 FA Youth Cup defeating Arsenal 5–1 at the Emirates Stadium in April 2023. He scored West Ham's fourth goal with a header at the back post from an Oliver Scarles corner kick. He signed a new four-year contract with West Ham in August 2023.

Casey made his Premier League debut on 11 May 2024, as a late substitute for Angelo Ogbonna in a 3–1 home win against Luton Town.

On 4 August 2025, Casey joined Championship club Swansea City on loan for the 2025–26 season.

Casey signed a season long loan at Stevenage on 1 September 2026.

== International career ==
On 7 June 2024, Casey made his England U20 debut during a 2–1 win over Sweden at Stadion ŠRC Sesvete.

== Style of play ==
Casey cites Declan Rice as his role model. His father, Paul, told The Athletic that whilst he has always played as a centre-back he can also contribute in midfield.

== Personal life ==
Casey attended Shaw Primary Academy in South Ockendon in the borough of Thurrock in Essex. He is a West Ham United supporter and former season ticket holder.

== Career statistics ==
As of match played 24 October 2026

Appearances and goals by club, season and competition
Club	Season	League			FA Cup		EFL Cup		Europe		Other		Total	
Club	Season	Division	Apps	Goals	Apps	Goals	Apps	Goals	Apps	Goals	Apps	Goals	Apps	Goals
West Ham United U23	2022–23	—			—		—		—		2 (Note: Appearance(s) in EFL Trophy)	0	2	0
West Ham United U23	2023–24	—			—		—		—		5	0	5	0
West Ham United U23	2024–25	—			—		—		—		2	0	2	0
West Ham United U23	Total		—		—		—		—		9	0	9	0
West Ham United	2022–23	Premier League	0	0	0	0	0	0	1 (Note: Appearance in UEFA Europa Conference League)	0	—		1	0
West Ham United	2023–24	Premier League	1	0	0	0	0	0	0	0	—		1	0
West Ham United	2024–25	Premier League	1	0	0	0	0	0	—		—		1	0
West Ham United	2026–27	Championship	0	0	0	0	1	0	—		—		1	0
West Ham United	Total		2	0	0	0	1	0	1	0	0	0	4	0
Swansea City (loan)	2025–26	Championship	8	0	1	0	4	0	—		—		13	0
Leyton Orient (loan)	2025–26	League One	16	0	0	0	0	0	—		—		16	0
Stevenage (loan)	2026–27	League One	1	0	0	0	0	0	—		2	0	3	0
Career total			27	0	1	0	4	0	1	0	11	0	45	0

== Honours ==
West Ham United U18

- FA Youth Cup: 2022–23
- U18 Premier League South: 2023
