= Dom Ballard =

English footballer (born 2005)

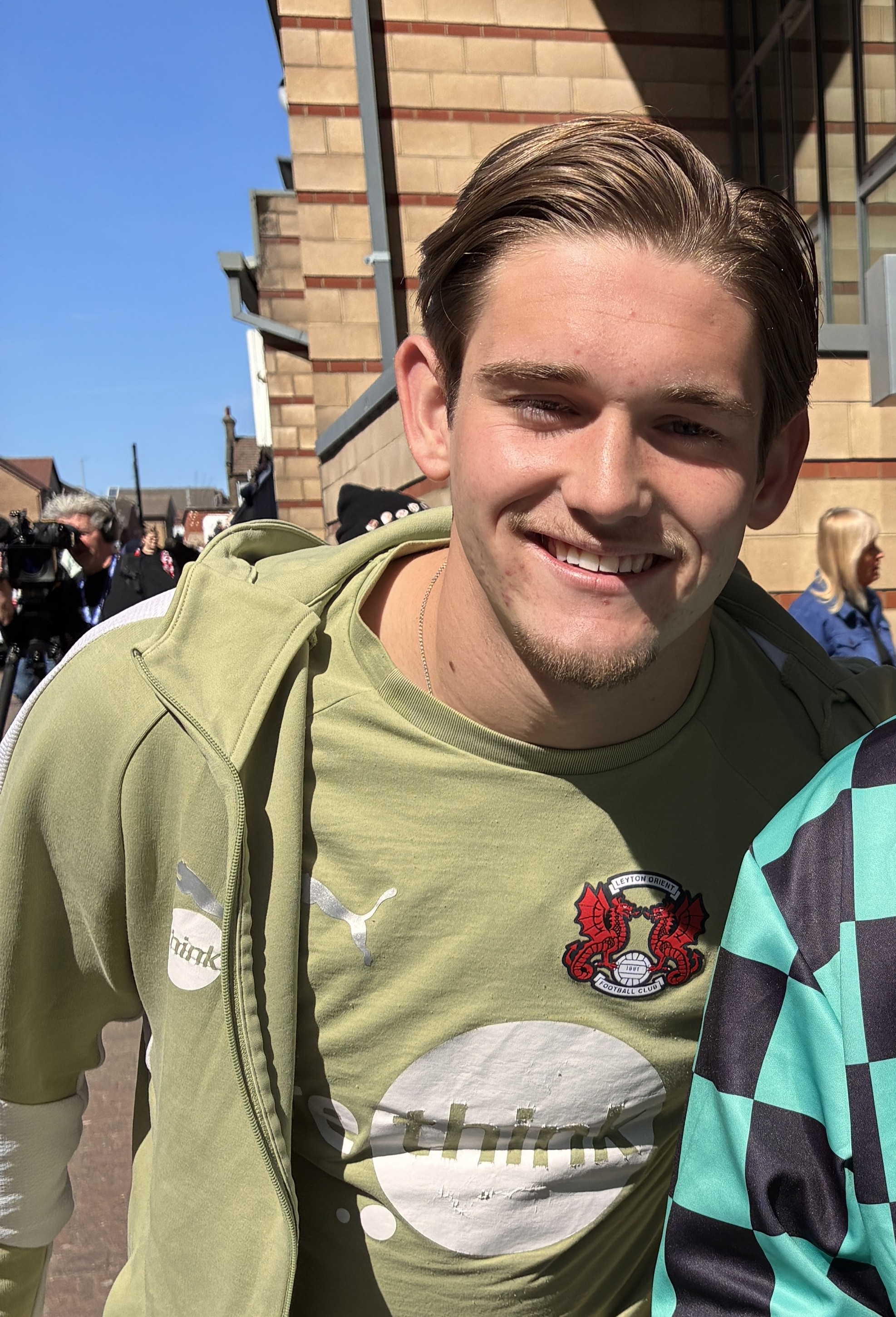
- Ballard in 2026

Personal information
- Full name: Dominic Ballard
- Date of birth: 1 April 2005 (age 21)
- Place of birth: Guildford, England
- Height: 1.78 m (5 ft 10 in)
- Position: Forward

Team information
- Current team: Bristol City
- Number: 23

Youth career
- 2013–2022: Southampton

Senior career*
Years	Team	Apps	(Gls)
2022–2025	Southampton	2	(0)
2023–2024	→ Reading (loan)	10	(3)
2024–2025	→ Blackpool (loan)	18	(1)
2025	→ Cambridge United (loan)	17	(2)
2025–2026	Leyton Orient	40	(23)
2026–	Bristol City	15	(4)

International career^{‡}
2022	England U17	3	(0)
2022	England U18	3	(3)
2023	England U19	8	(4)
2024	England U20	6	(1)
- * Club domestic league appearances and goals as of 06:05, 12 November 2026 (UTC) ‡ National team caps and goals as of 13:38, 12 December 2024 (UTC)

Dominic Ballard (born 1 April 2005) is an English professional footballer who plays as a forward for EFL Championship club Bristol City.

Ballard is a product of the Southampton academy and made his professional debut for the club in August 2022. He had loan spells at Reading, Blackpool and Cambridge United. In September 2025, Ballard joined Leyton Orient. He has represented his country at youth level.

== Early life ==
Ballard spent the formative years of his childhood living in Greece, before his family moved back to England in 2010 and settled in Berkshire. When he was first invited to train at Southampton, Ballard and his parents would commute to the south coast a couple of times a week.

== Club career ==
=== Southampton ===
Ballard signed his first professional contract with Southampton in April 2022.

On 23 August 2022, he made his senior debut and scored his first goal for Southampton's first team in a 3–0 victory against Cambridge United in the EFL Cup. On 21 May 2023, Ballard made his Premier League debut in a 3–1 defeat to Brighton & Hove Albion, replacing Joe Aribo in the 70th minute.

On 27 June 2023, Ballard signed a two-year contract extension until 2026.

==== Reading (loan) ====
On 1 September 2023, Ballard joined League One side Reading on a season-long loan. He made his debut for the club on 16 September 2023 in a 2–1 victory against Bolton Wanderers. On 19 September 2023, Ballard scored a brace during a 0–9 victory against Exeter City in the EFL Trophy. He scored his first league goal for the club on 3 October 2023 in a 3–1 defeat to Northampton Town. During a 1–2 victory against Wycombe Wanderers on 25 November 2023, Ballard was forced off in the first half after suffering a leg injury from a fall. Three days later, head coach Rubén Sellés confirmed that Ballard would be out for the season after snapping his patellar tendon.

==== Blackpool (loan) ====
On 13 August 2024, Ballard joined League One side Blackpool on a season-long loan. He made his debut for the club on 17 August 2024 in a 3–0 home defeat against Stockport County after he replaced Ashley Fletcher in the 72nd minute. On 24 August 2024, Ballard scored his first goal for the club in a 4–4 draw with Cambridge United. He suffered a shoulder injury during a 2–0 victory against Huddersfield Town on 24 September 2024, with head coach Steve Bruce later confirming Ballard was expected to be sidelined for several weeks. On 3 January 2025, he was recalled from loan and returned to Southampton.

==== Cambridge United (loan) ====
On 27 January 2025, Ballard joined League One side Cambridge United on loan for the remainder of the 2024–25 season. He made his debut for the club on 28 January 2025 in a 2–1 defeat against Rotherham United after he replaced Josh Stokes in the 67th minute. On 11 March 2025, Ballard scored his first goal for the club in a 2–1 defeat against Blackpool.

=== Leyton Orient ===
On 1 September 2025, Ballard joined Leyton Orient on a three-year contract with an option of a fourth. He was named EFL League One Player of the Month for January 2026 having scored five goals in six matches, including a perfect hat-trick against former club Reading. He was named EFL Young Player of the Month for March 2026 following six contributions across the month, including a second hat-trick of the season. At the 2026 EFL Awards, Ballard was named in the League One Team of the Season, also named as Player of the Season and Young Player of the Season.

=== Bristol City ===
On 4 August 2026, Ballard signed for Championship club Bristol City on a four-year contract, for an undisclosed transfer fee.

== International career ==
Having previously represented England U17s, Ballard made his U18 debut during a 1–0 win over the Netherlands in Pinatar on 21 September 2022.

On 6 September 2023, Ballard made his England U19 debut during a 1–0 defeat to Germany in Oliva.

On 6 September 2024, Ballard made a goalscoring England U20 debut during a 1–1 draw away to Turkey.

== Career statistics ==
=== Club ===
As of match played 7 November 2026

Appearances and goals by club, season and competition
Club	Season	League			FA Cup		EFL Cup		Other		Total	
Club	Season	Division	Apps	Goals	Apps	Goals	Apps	Goals	Apps	Goals	Apps	Goals
Southampton U23	2021–22	—	—		—		—		3 (Note: Appearances in EFL Trophy)	0	3	0
Southampton	2022–23	Premier League	2	0	1	0	1	1	—		4	1
Southampton	2023–24	Championship	0	0	0	0	0	0	—		0	0
Southampton	2024–25	Premier League	0	0	0	0	0	0	—		0	0
Southampton	Total		2	0	1	0	1	1	—		4	1
Reading (loan)	2023–24	League One	10	3	1	0	0	0	1	2	12	5
Blackpool (loan)	2024–25	League One	18	1	2	0	1	0	1	0	22	1
Cambridge United (loan)	2024–25	League One	17	2	—		—		0	0	17	2
Leyton Orient	2025–26	League One	40	23	2	0	0	0	2	0	44	23
Bristol City	2026–27	Championship	15	4	0	0	1	0	—		16	4
Career total			102	33	6	0	3	1	7	2	118	36

== Honours ==
Individual

- EFL League One Player of the Month: January 2026
- EFL Young Player of the Month: March 2026
- EFL League One Team of the Season: 2025–26
- EFL League One Player of the Season: 2025–26
- EFL League One Young Player of the Season: 2025–26
- PFA Team of the Year: 2025–26 League One
- PFA Players' Player of the Year: 2025–26 League One
