= 2025–26 Leyton Orient F.C. season =

127th season in existence of Leyton Orient FC

Leyton Orient
2025–26 season
- Chairman: Nigel Travis
- Head Coach: Richie Wellens
- Stadium: Brisbane Road
- League One: 20th
- FA Cup: Second round
- EFL Cup: First round
- EFL Trophy: Round of 32
- Top goalscorer: League: Dom Ballard (22); All: Dom Ballard (22)
- Highest home attendance: 8,794 vs Plymouth Argyle (17 February 2026, League One)
- Lowest home attendance: 1,373 vs Crawley Town (7 October 2025, EFL Trophy)
- Average home league attendance: 8,270
- Biggest win: 4–0 vs Doncaster Rovers (H) (11 October 2025, League One); 0–4 vs Burton Albion (A) (29 November 2025, League One)
- Biggest defeat: 4–0 vs Salford City (A) (5 December 2025, FA Cup)
Home colours	Away colours	Third colours

The 2025–26 season is the 127th season in the history of Leyton Orient Football Club and their third consecutive season in League One. The club are participating in League One, and also compete in the FA Cup, the EFL Cup, and the EFL Trophy.

== Kit ==
Puma continued as Kit Suppliers with financial entity Eastdil Secured. being front of shirt sponsor.

== Transfers and contracts ==
=== In ===
Date	Pos.	Player	From	Fee	Ref.
1 July 2025 (Note: The transfer was announced on 24 June, and would become official on July 1 once his contract at Brighton had expired)	GK	(Republic of Ireland) Killian Cahill	(England) Brighton & Hove Albion	Free	
1 July 2025 (Note: The transfer was announced on 27 June, and would become official on July 1 once his contract at Exeter had expired)	AM	(England) Demetri Mitchell	(England) Exeter City	Free	
4 July 2025	DM	(Scotland) Michael Craig	(England) Reading	Free	
4 July 2025	CM	(Tunisia) Idris El Mizouni	(England) Oxford United	Undisclosed	
7 July 2025	CF	(Republic of Ireland) Aaron Connolly	(England) Millwall	Free	
11 July 2025	DM	(England) Tyreeq Bakinson	(England) Wycombe Wanderers	Undisclosed	
16 July 2025	LW	(Sierra Leone) Josh Koroma	(England) Huddersfield Town	Free	
4 August 2025	LW	(England) Lemar Gordon	(England) Fulham	Undisclosed	
12 August 2025	CM	(England) Charlie Wellens	(England) Reading	Free	
1 September 2025	CF	(England) Dom Ballard	(England) Southampton	Undisclosed	
8 January 2026	CB	(England) Will Forrester	(England) Bolton Wanderers	Undisclosed	
2 February 2026	CM	(Wales) Dylan Levitt	(Scotland) Hibernian	Free Transfer	
2 February 2026	LB	(England) James Morris	(England) Watford	Free Transfer	
2 February 2026	GK	(England) Tobi Oluwayemi	(Scotland) Celtic	Undisclosed	

=== Out ===
Date	Pos.	Player	To	Fee	Ref.
4 July 2025	CM	(Northern Ireland) Ethan Galbraith	(Wales) Swansea City	£1,500,000	
8 July 2025	DM	(England) Jordan Brown	(England) Blackpool	Undisclosed	
16 July 2025	RM	(England) Charlie Pegrum	(England) Hornchurch	Undisclosed	
26 August 2025	CB	(Wales) Brandon Cooper	(England) Salford City	Free transfer	

Income: ▲ ~ £1,500,000

=== Loaned in ===
Date	Pos.	Player	From	Date until	Ref.
18 July 2025	GK	(England) Tommy Simkin	(England) Stoke City	1 January 2026 (Note: On 1 January, Simkin was recalled to his parent club Stoke)	
26 July 2025	LB	(Republic of Ireland) Tayo Adaramola	(England) Crystal Palace	5 January 2026 (Note: On 5 January, Adaramola's season-long loan from Crystal Palace was terminated)	
29 July 2025	CAM	(England) Joe White	(England) Newcastle United	5 January 2026 (Note: On 5 January, White's season-long loan from Newcastle was terminated)	
1 August 2025	CM	(Republic of Ireland) Jack Moorhouse	(England) Manchester United	2 February 2026 (Note: On 2 February, Moorhouse's initial season-long loan from Manchester United was terminated)	
8 August 2025	CF	(England) Alfie Lloyd	(England) Queens Park Rangers	16 January 2026 (Note: On 16 January, Lloyd was recalled to Queens Park Rangers from his initial season-long loan)	
16 January 2026	CB	(England) Kaelan Casey	(England) West Ham United	31 May 2026	
16 January 2026	CF	(England) Ajay Matthews	(England) Millwall	31 May 2026	
30 January 2026	GK	(Austria) Daniel Bachmann	(England) Watford	31 May 2026	
2 February 2026	GK	(England) Will Dennis	(England) Bournemouth	31 May 2026	
2 February 2026	RW	(England) Favour Fawunmi	(England) Stoke City	2 April 2026 (Note: On 2 April, Fawunmi's half-season loan from Stoke City was cut short due to sustaining an injury)	

=== Loaned out ===
Date	Pos.	Player	To	Date until	Ref.
8 August 2025	CB	(England) Phillip Chinedu	(England) Wealdstone	3 November 2025 (Note: On 10 October, Chinedu's loan at Wealdstone was extended for a further two months, However on 3 November he was recalled to the club)	
29 August 2025	CDM	(Jamaica) Makai Welch	(England) Hornchurch	26 September 2025	
9 September 2025	CAM	(England) Abdi Mohamud	(England) Waltham Abbey	3 November 2025 (Note: On 7 October, Mohamud's loan at Waltham Abbey was extended for a further month.)	
10 September 2025	GK	(England) Noah Phillips	(England) Dorking Wanderers	8 October 2025	
13 September 2025	CM	(England) Zack Hambury	(England) Welling United	11 October 2025	
19 September 2025	CM	(England) Zak O'Keefe	(England) Heybridge Swifts	18 October 2025	
11 October 2025	CAM	(England) Dan Carter	(England) Dartford	8 November 2025	
21 November 2025	LW	(England) Lemar Gordon	(England) South Shields	13 January 2026 (Note: On 22 December, Gordon's loan at South Shields was extended by a further month)	
30 December 2025	CAM	(England) Abdi Mohamud	(England) Canvey Island	26 March 2026 (Note: On 4 March, Mohamud's loan at Canvey Island was extended until the end of the regular Isthmian Premier Division season. But then on 26 March, he was recalled)	
10 January 2026	LB	(England) Luke Northwood	(England) Erith Town	7 February 2026	
17 January 2026	CM	(England) Charlie Anderson	(England) Enfield	31 May 2026 (Note: On 23 February, Anderson's loan at Enfield was extended until the end of the season)	
20 January 2026	CB	(England) Phillip Chinedu	(England) Barnet	31 May 2026	
20 January 2026	RW	(England) Diallang Jaiyesimi	(England) Barnet	31 May 2026	
23 January 2026	CM	(England) Alfie Wellens	(England) Dagenham & Redbridge	11 February 2026 (Note: On 11 February, Wellens was recalled from his loan at Dagenham & Redbridge)	
24 January 2026	CM	(England) Zak O'Keefe	(England) Welling United	31 May 2026 (Note: On 23 February, O'Keefe's loan at Welling United was extended until the end of the season)	
2 February 2026	CM	(Kenya) Zech Obiero	(England) Tranmere Rovers	31 May 2026	
5 February 2026	CDM	(Jamaica) Makai Welch	(England) Hornchurch	31 May 2026	
12 February 2026	CM	(England) Zack Hambury	(England) Canvey Island	12 March 2026	
19 February 2026	GK	(England) Noah Phillips	(England) Chelmsford City	19 March 2026	
26 February 2026	CM	(England) Alfie Wellens	(England) Chertsey Town	26 March 2026	
2 March 2026	CM	(England) Izchuckwu Okafor	(England) Enfield	30 March 2026	
6 March 2026	CF	(Equatorial Guinea) Claudio Nzang	(England) Northwood	26 April 2026	
17 March 2026	LB	(England) Tajuddin Bello	(England) Enfield	31 May 2026	
26 March 2026	LB	(England) Luke Northwood	(England) Tilbury	30 April 2026	

=== Released / Out of Contract ===
Date	Pos.	Player	Subsequent club	Joined date	Ref.
30 June 2025	CF	(England) Dan Agyei	(Turkey) Kocaelispor	1 July 2025	
30 June 2025	DM	(England) Dominic Ball	(England) Cambridge United	1 July 2025	
30 June 2025	GK	(England) Sam Howes	(England) Dagenham & Redbridge	1 July 2025	
30 June 2025	LB	(England) Jayden Sweeney	(England) Grimsby Town	1 July 2025	
30 June 2025	GK	(England) Rhys Byrne	(England) Hornchurch	1 August 2025	
30 June 2025	CF	(England) Reon Smith-Kouassi	(England) Cheshunt	7 August 2025	
30 June 2025	AM	(Greece) Thomas Avgoustidis	(England) Royston Town	8 August 2025	
30 June 2025	CF	(England) Joe Pigott	(England) Folkestone Invicta	5 September 2025	
30 June 2025	LM	(England) Randell Williams	(England) Reading	5 November 2025	
30 June 2025	CM	(England) Darren Pratley	Retired		
1 August 2025	CM	(England) Lewis Warrington	(England) Walsall	1 August 2025	
2 February 2026	CB	(Grenada) Omar Beckles	(England) Gilligham	2 February 2026	

=== New Contract ===
Date	Pos.	Player	Contract until	Ref.
28 June 2025	CB	(England) Jack Simpson	30 June 2026	
29 June 2025	CB	(Grenada) Omar Beckles	30 June 2027	
29 June 2025	GK	(England) Noah Phillips	30 June 2027	
29 June 2025	DM	(Jamaica) Makai Welch	30 June 2026	
28 July 2025	CM	(England) Dan Carter	30 June 2027 (Note: First professional contract)	
28 July 2025	CB	(England) Phillip Chinedu	30 June 2027	
17 October 2025	CM	(England) Charlie Wellens	30 June 2027 (Note: Appearance clause for a further year)	
13 November 2025	LWB	(Scotland) Theo Archibald	30 June 2026	
1 December 2025	CM	(Kenya) Zech Obiero	30 June 2028 (Note: Option for an additional year)	
4 December 2025	LW	(Republic of Ireland) Ollie O'Neill	30 June 2028	

== Pre-season and friendlies ==
On 30 May, Leyton Orient announced their first pre-season friendly, against Watford. Six days later, a double header against Barnet and Ebbsfleet United was confirmed. A fourth friendly was added, against Brentwood Town. On 12 June, a pre-season camp in Marbella was announced. A day later, a trip to Welling United was confirmed. A sixth fixture was added, against Tottenham Hotspur U21 to honor the legacy of Justin Edinburgh for the JE3 Trophy. On 18 June, Pafos were confirmed as the opponents whilst in Spain.

Win Draw Loss Fixtures

5 July 2025 Friendly	Brentwood Town	0–5	Leyton Orient	Brentwood
13:00 BST		Report	Abdulai 9'; Trialist 24'; Hambury 54'; Jaiyesimi 71'; Perkins 86'	Stadium: Brentwood Centre Arena

11 July 2025 Friendly	Pafos	1–0	Leyton Orient	Marbella, Spain
11:00 CEST	Bruno 25'	Report		Stadium: Banus Football Centre

16 July 2025 Friendly	Welling United	0–10	Leyton Orient	Northfleet
19:45 BST		Report	Mitchell 2'; Obiero 3', 28'; Connolly 30'; Abdulai 41'; Koroma 52', 66'; Perkins 69', 74'; Hambury 71'	Stadium: Stonebridge Road
Note: Fixture was originally scheduled to take place at Park View Road, but was changed due to the playing surface conditions.

19 July 2025 Friendly	Barnet	2–0	Leyton Orient	Edgware
15:30 BST		Report		Stadium: The Hive Stadium; Attendance: 0 (behind-closed-doors)
Note: Fixture was initially postponed due to a waterlogged pitch, however after a couple of hours a second referee deemed the pitch to be playable.

19 July 2025 Friendly	Ebbsfleet United	1–4	Leyton Orient	Northfleet
13:00 BST	Appiah 45+1'	Report	Connolly 7'; Clare 19'; Carter 81'; Jaiyesimi 82'	Stadium: Stonebridge Road

22 July 2025 Friendly	Leyton Orient	3–1	Tottenham Hotspur U21	Leyton
19:45 BST	Connolly 32'; Wellens 74'; Jaiyesimi 85'	Report	Thompson 65'	Stadium: Brisbane Road

25 July 2025 Friendly	Barnet XI	0–4	Leyton Orient	Edgware
12:00 BST		Report	Obiero 16'; Abdulai 35'; Jaiyesimi 55'; Carter 66'	Stadium: The Hive Stadium; Attendance: 0 (behind-closed-doors)

26 July 2025 Friendly	Leyton Orient	1–1	Watford	Leyton
15:00 BST	Bakinson 53'	Report	Sissoko 55'	Stadium: Brisbane Road; Attendance: 4,074

26 August 2025 Friendly	Leyton Orient XI	4–2	PFA XI	Leyton
13:00 BST	Wellens 7', 19'; Perkins 62'; Abdulai 72'	Report	Ward 60'; Adelakun 89'	Stadium: Brisbane Road; Attendance: 0 (behind-closed-doors)

24 February 2026 Friendly	Waltham Abbey	1–3	Leyton Orient	Waltham Abbey
TBC GMT		Report	Gordon 10'; Matthews (?); Lowe 77'	Stadium: Capershotts

== Competitions ==
=== League One ===
==== League table ====
Pos	Team	Pld	W	D	L	GF	GA	GD	Pts	Promotion, qualification or relegation
18	Peterborough United	46	15	8	23	64	68	−4	53	
19	AFC Wimbledon	46	15	8	23	51	72	−21	53	
20	Leyton Orient	46	14	10	22	59	71	−12	52	
21	Exeter City (R)	46	12	13	21	52	61	−9	49	Relegation to EFL League Two
22	Port Vale (R)	46	10	12	24	36	61	−25	42	Relegation to EFL League Two

Source: EFL Official Website
Rules for classification: 1) Points; 2) Goal difference; 3) Number of goals scored; 4) Head-to-head results; 5) Wins; 6) Away goals; 7) Penalty points (sec 9.5); 8) 12-point sending off offences
(R) Relegated

==== Results summary ====
Overall								Home						Away					
Pld	W	D	L	GF	GA	GD	Pts	W	D	L	GF	GA	GD	W	D	L	GF	GA	GD
46	14	10	22	59	71	−12	52	8	7	8	32	30	+2	6	3	14	27	41	−14

Last updated: complete.
Source: Soccerway

==== Results by round ====
Round	1	2	3	4	5	6	7	8	9	10	11	12	13	14	15	16	17	18	19	20	21	22	23	24	26	27	28	29	30	31	33	34	35	36	25^{1}	37	38	39	40	41	42	43	32^{2}	44	45	46
Ground	A	H	H	A	A	H	A	H	A	H	A	H	A	H	A	H	H	A	H	A	H	A	A	H	H	H	A	A	H	A	H	A	H	A	A	H	A	H	A	A	H	A	H	H	A	H
Result	L	W	D	W	L	L	W	D	L	L	L	W	L	W	L	W	D	W	D	L	W	L	L	L	D	W	L	L	L	D	L	W	L	L	W	W	W	W	D	D	L	L	D	L	L	D
Position	24	16	14	9	13	16	12	14	14	17	17	13	15	14	20	16	16	12	12	13	11	12	16	18	18	16	16	18	18	18	22	19	21	21	19	19	16	16	17	15	15	19	17	19	20	20
Points	0	3	4	7	7	7	10	11	11	11	11	14	14	17	17	20	21	24	25	25	28	28	28	28	29	32	32	32	32	33	33	36	36	36	39	42	45	48	49	50	50	50	51	51	51	52

Source: EFL
A = Away; H = Home; W = Win; D = Draw; L = Loss; P = Postponed
Notes:
- ^{1} Matchday 25 (vs. Stevenage) was postponed due to a frozen pitch.
- ^{2} Matchday 32 (vs. Mansfield Town) was postponed due to their FA Cup progression to the fourth round.

==== Matches ====
On 26 June, the League One were released, with Orient travelling to Huddersfield Town on the opening weekend.

Win Draw Loss Fixtures

2 August 2025 1	Huddersfield Town	3–0	Leyton Orient	Huddersfield
15:00 BST	Low 7'; Gooch (yellow card) 9'; Whatmough (yellow card) 42'; Harness (yellow card) 45+5'; May 55' (pen.); Roosken 90+5'	Report		Stadium: Kirklees Stadium; Attendance: 17,062; Referee: Simon Mather

9 August 2025 2	Leyton Orient	2–0	Wigan Athletic	Leyton
15:00 BST	Sessegnon 18' (o.g.); Koroma 60'	Report	Sessegnon (yellow card) 38', (red card) 85'	Stadium: Brisbane Road; Attendance: 8,111; Referee: Neil Hair

16 August 2025 3	Leyton Orient	2–2	Stockport County	Leyton
15:00 BST	Connolly (yellow card) 21', (goal) 57'; Happe (yellow card) 35'; O'Neill 90+3'	Report	Norwood (yellow card) 21'; Lowe 29'; Diamond (yellow card) 34'; Olowu 36'	Stadium: Brisbane Road; Attendance: 7,651; Referee: Ruebyn Ricardo

19 August 2025 4	Plymouth Argyle	0–1	Leyton Orient	Plymouth
19:45 BST	Benarous (yellow card) 72'	Report	Happe (yellow card) 39'; Koroma 63'; Simkin (yellow card) 70'	Stadium: Home Park; Attendance: 15,422 (420 away); Referee: Benjamin Speedie

23 August 2025 5	Mansfield Town	4–1	Leyton Orient	Mansfield
15:00 BST	Hendry 15', 29'; Cargill (yellow card) 42'; Evans (yellow card) 50', (goal) 59'; Bolton 90+5'	Report	Koroma 37'; El Mizouni (yellow card) 51' (yellow-red card) 62'	Stadium: Field Mill; Attendance: 7,537; Referee: Carl Brook

30 August 2025 6	Leyton Orient	0–1	Northampton Town	Leyton
15:00 BST	Adaramola (yellow card) 40'; James (yellow card) 45+2'; Koroma (yellow card) 54'; Beckles (yellow card) 90+5'; Connolly (yellow card) 90+6'	Report	Hoskins 58'	Stadium: Brisbane Road; Attendance: 8,009; Referee: Jacob Miles

6 September 2025 7	Port Vale	2–3	Leyton Orient	Burslem
15:00 BST	Croasdale 7'; Cole 52'	Report	Connolly 13'; Ballard 44'; Wellens 90+5'	Stadium: Vale Park; Attendance: 7,721; Referee: Ross Joyce

13 September 2025 8	Leyton Orient	1–1	Bolton Wanderers	Leyton
15:00 BST	Mitchell (yellow card) 29'; Simpson (yellow card) 39', (goal) 69'; James (yellow card) 89'	Report	Dacres-Cogley (yellow card) 28'; Johnston (yellow card) 87'; Cozier-Duberry 90+4'	Stadium: Brisbane Road; Attendance: 8,731; Referee: David Rock

20 September 2025 9	Reading	2–1	Leyton Orient	Reading
15:00 BST	Marriott 21'; Williams (yellow card) 45+5'; Ahmed (yellow card) 51'; Wing (yellow card) 76'; Fraser 79'; Garcia (yellow card) 90+5'; Ritchie (yellow card) 90+8'	Report	El Mizouni 48'; James (yellow card) 50'; Abdulai (yellow card) 84'; Koroma (yellow card) 90+1'	Stadium: Madejski Stadium; Attendance: 12,553; Referee: Ollie Yates

27 September 2025 10	Leyton Orient	2–3	Stevenage	Leyton
12:30 BST	Connolly 24'; Ballard 68'	Report	White 26'; Freestone 54'; Piergianni 61'; Goode (yellow card) 90+4'	Stadium: Brisbane Road; Attendance: 7,898; Referee: Andrew Humphries
Note: Fixture was originally scheduled for a 15:00 kick-off, but was moved live Sky Sports broadcasting.

4 October 2025 11	Cardiff City	4–3	Leyton Orient	Cardiff
15:00 BST	Robinson 20', 71'; Kpakio (yellow card) 30'; Lawlor 52'; Willock (yellow card) 57'; Salech 69'		Connolly 29', (yellow card) 78'; El Mizouni 54'; Clare (yellow card) 57'; Ballard 61'	Stadium: Cardiff City Stadium; Attendance: 18,528; Referee: Matthew Corlett

11 October 2025 12	Leyton Orient	4–0	Doncaster Rovers	Leyton
15:00 BST	Ballard 2', 49', 72'; Connolly 20'; El Mizouni (yellow card) 90+6'	Report	McGrath (yellow card) 24'	Stadium: Brisbane Road; Attendance: 8,128; Referee: Edward Duckworth

18 October 2025 13	Rotherham United	1–0	Leyton Orient	Rotherham
15:00 BST	Hugill (yellow card) 21'; Spence (yellow card) 29'; Gore (yellow card) 45+4'; Nombe 56'	Report	Clare (yellow card) 21'; El Mizouni (yellow card) 27'; Happe (yellow card) 90+5'	Stadium: New York Stadium; Attendance: 8,057; Referee: Scott Oldham

25 October 2025 14	Leyton Orient	1–0	Lincoln City	Leyton
15:00 BST	El Mizouni 62'	Report	Bayliss (yellow card) 39'; Hamer (yellow card) 90+4'	Stadium: Brisbane Road; Attendance: 8,280; Referee: Stephen Parkinson

8 November 2025 15	Wycombe Wanderers	4–1	Leyton Orient	High Wycombe
12:30 GMT	Onyedinma 4', 16'; Norris (yellow card) 10'; Casey 30'; Bell 75'; Woodrow (yellow card) 77'; Lowry (yellow card) 90+4'	Report	Connolly 11'; Abdulai (yellow card) 17'; Cahill (yellow card) 26'; James (yellow card) 34'	Stadium: Adams Park; Attendance: 4,991; Referee: Martin Woods
Note: Fixture was originally scheduled for a 15:00 kick-off, but was moved live Sky Sports broadcasting.

15 November 2025 16	Leyton Orient	2–1	Exeter City	London (Leyton)
15:00 GMT	Simpson (yellow card) 13'; Clare (yellow card) 44'; El Mizouni 76'; Bakinson 81'; Abdulai (yellow card) 90+2'	Report	Sweeney (yellow card) 16'; Wareham 38' (pen.); Brierley (yellow card) 46'	Stadium: Brisbane Road; Attendance: 8,519; Referee: Ruebyn Ricardo

22 November 2025 17	Leyton Orient	1–1	Blackpool	Leyton
15:00 GMT	Connolly 23'; Bakinson (yellow card) 33'; Adaramola (yellow card) 35' (yellow-red card) 47'; O'Neill (yellow card) 80'; Abdulai (yellow card) 90+7'	Report	Ihiekwe (yellow card) 30'; Fletcher (yellow card) 45+2', (goal) 90+4'; Horsfall (yellow card) 54'	Stadium: Brisbane Road; Attendance: 8,181; Referee: Sam Allison

29 November 2025 18	Burton Albion	0–4	Leyton Orient	Burton upon Trent
15:00 GMT	Evans (yellow card) 29'; Chauke (yellow card) 61'; Lofthouse (yellow card) 90+6'	Report	Connolly 12'; Ballard 26'; Abdulai 65'; Wellens 75'	Stadium: Pirelli Stadium; Attendance: 3,264; Referee: Paul Howard

9 December 2025 19	Leyton Orient	1–1	Luton Town	Leyton
19:45 GMT	Archibald 50'; Happe (yellow card) 62'	Report	Walsh (yellow card) 41'; Andersen (yellow card) 86'; Kodua 90+6'	Stadium: Brisbane Road; Attendance: 8,176; Referee: Darren Drysdale

13 December 2025 20	Barnsley	3–2	Leyton Orient	Barnsley
15:00 GMT	Cleary 10'; Cooper (yellow card) 27'; Russell 77'; Keillor-Dunn 85'	Report	Ballard 30' (pen.); O'Neill 38', (yellow card) 44'; Craig (yellow card) 51'; Bakinson (yellow card) 76'	Stadium: Oakwell; Attendance: 10,232; Referee: Simon Mather

20 December 2025 21	Leyton Orient	2–1	Bradford City	Leyton
15:00 GMT	Ballard 36', 58'; Bakinson (yellow card) 45'; Wellens (yellow card) 65'; Happe (yellow card) 75'	Report	Humphrys 17'; Wright (yellow card) 28'; Halliday (yellow card) 55'; Baldwin (yellow card) 77'	Stadium: Brisbane Road; Attendance: 8,693; Referee: Will Finnie

26 December 2025 22	Peterborough United	1–0	Leyton Orient	Peterborough
15:00 GMT	Collins (yellow card) 22'; Kioso (yellow card) 36'; Frith 90+4'	Report	Mitchell (yellow card) 46'; James (yellow card) 51'; Simpson (yellow card) 64'	Stadium: London Road Stadium; Attendance: 9,882; Referee: Abigail Byrne

29 December 2025 23	Luton Town	3–0	Leyton Orient	Luton
19:45 GMT	Kodua 8'; Clark 19' (pen.); Morris 37'; Mengi (yellow card) 52'; Nelson (yellow card) 90+1'	Report		Stadium: Kenilworth Road; Attendance: 11,736; Referee: Neil Hair

1 January 2026 24	Leyton Orient	1–3	AFC Wimbledon	Leyton
15:00 GMT	Ballard 6'; Obiero (yellow card) 67'; Simpson (yellow card) 89'	Report	Browne (yellow card) 17', (goal) 86'; Mitchell 24' (o.g.); Hippolyte 69'	Stadium: Brisbane Road; Attendance: 8,643

10 January 2026 26	Leyton Orient	1–1	Cardiff City	Leyton
15:00 GMT	Ballard 12'; Archibald (yellow card) 55'	Report	Salech 33'; Tanner (yellow card) 55'	Stadium: Brisbane Road; Attendance: 8,423; Referee: Scott Oldham

17 January 2026 27	Leyton Orient	3–1	Reading	Leyton
15:00 GMT	Ballard 45', 65', 85'; Archibald (yellow card) 57'; Clare (yellow card) 78'; Cahill (yellow card) 90+9'	Report	Yiadom (yellow card) 7'; Savage (yellow card) 39'; Marriott 52'; O'Connor (yellow card) 77'	Stadium: Brisbane Road; Attendance: 8,492; Referee: Elliot Bell

24 January 2026 28	Bolton Wanderers	2–1	Leyton Orient	Horwich
15:00 GMT	Osei-Tutu (yellow card) 13'; Christie (yellow card) 33'; Gale 46'; McAtee (yellow card) 70'; Burstow 90+1' (pen.)	Report	Abdulai (yellow card) 29'; Archibald 49'	Stadium: Toughsheet Community Stadium; Attendance: 20,352; Referee: Seb Stockbridge

27 January 2026 29	Doncaster Rovers	3–0	Leyton Orient	Doncaster
20:00 GMT	Bailey 34', 49'; Sterry (yellow card) 38'; Molyneux 45+1' (pen.); Sharp (yellow card) 79'	Report	Casey (yellow card) 45'; O'Neill (yellow card) 51'; Wellens (yellow card) 90+1'	Stadium: Eco-Power Stadium; Attendance: 7,033; Referee: Martin Woods
Note: Fixture was originally scheduled for a 20:00 kick-off, but was rescheduled for live Sky Sports broadcasting.

31 January 2026 30	Leyton Orient	0–1	Port Vale	Leyton
15:00 GMT	Ballard (yellow card) 34'; Casey (yellow card) 80'	Report	John 2'; Ojo (yellow card) 22'; Gordon (yellow card) 72'	Stadium: Brisbane Road; Attendance: 7,692; Referee: David Rock

7 February 2026 31	Stockport County	0–0	Leyton Orient	Edgeley
15:00 GMT	Dacres-Cogley (yellow card) 38' (yellow-red card) 80'; Pye (yellow card) 51'	Report	Happe (yellow card) 27'; Forrester (yellow card) 90+12'	Stadium: Edgeley Park; Attendance: 9,162; Referee: Andrew Humphries

17 February 2026 33	Leyton Orient	1–3	Plymouth Argyle	Leyton
19:45 GMT	Archibald (yellow card) 17'; O'Neill 45+3'; Forrester (yellow card) 77'; Koroma (yellow card) 85'; Wellens (yellow card) 90+4'	Report	Dale (yellow card) 20'; Pepple 45+1', (yellow card) 47'; Curtis 52'; Ross 70'	Stadium: Brisbane Road; Attendance: 8,794; Referee: Alex Chilowicz

21 February 2026 34	Northampton Town	1–2	Leyton Orient	Northampton
15:00 GMT	Eaves 60'; Guinness-Walker (yellow card) 65'	Report	Ballard 10'; Craig (yellow card) 45'; Morris 47'; Dennis (yellow card) 72'	Stadium: Sixfields Stadium; Attendance: 6,441; Referee: Edward Duckworth

28 February 2026 35	Leyton Orient	1–3	Barnsley	Leyton
12:30 GMT	Levitt 20'; Abdulai (yellow card) 90+3'	Report	McGoldrick 10', 53', 62'; Phillips (yellow card) 49'	Stadium: Brisbane Road; Attendance: 8,313; Referee: Carl Brook
Note: Fixture was originally scheduled for a 15:00 kick-off, but was rescheduled for live Sky Sports broadcasting.

7 March 2026 36	Bradford City	2–1	Leyton Orient	Bradford
15:00 GMT	Sarcevic 33', 79', (yellow card) 86'; Pennington (yellow card) 59'; Wright (yellow card) 61'; Tilt (yellow card) 61'; Power (yellow card) 67'; Baldwin (red card) 75'; Mullin (yellow card) 87'	Report	Koroma (yellow card) 26'; O'Neill 43'; Clare (yellow card) 44'; Fawunmi (yellow card) 54'	Stadium: Valley Parade; Attendance: 20,123; Referee: Oliver Yates

10 March 2026 25	Stevenage	1–2	Leyton Orient	Stevenage
19:45 GMT	Reid 22' (pen.); Goode (yellow card) 45+6'	Report	Clare (yellow card) 21'; Ballard 44', 55'; O'Neill (yellow card) 80'; Casey (yellow card) 88'; Archibald (yellow card) 90+2'	Stadium: Broadhall Way; Attendance: 3,559; Referee: Charles Breakspear
Note: Fixture was originally scheduled for 4 January, but it was postponed due to a frozen pitch.

14 March 2026 37	Leyton Orient	2–1	Peterborough United	Leyton
15:00 GMT	Simpson 44'; Bakinson 81'; Happe (yellow card) 84'; Archibald (yellow card) 90+7'	Report	Frith (yellow card) 45+1'; Morgan 85'; Lisbie (yellow card) 90+9'	Stadium: Brisbane Road; Attendance: 8,514; Referee: Bobby Madley

17 March 2026 38	AFC Wimbledon	2–4	Leyton Orient	Wimbledon
19:45 GMT	Nkeng 39', 45+1'; Browne (yellow card) 90+5'	Report	Ballard 15', 48', 70'; Happe (yellow card) 53'; Morris 57'	Stadium: Plough Lane; Attendance: 8,275; Referee: Alan Dale

21 March 2026 39	Leyton Orient	2–0	Wycombe Wanderers	Leyton
15:00 GMT	Mitchell 19'; Archibald (yellow card) 44'; Forrester (yellow card) 74'; Ballard (yellow card) 78'; El Mizouni 90+1'	Report	Allen (red card) 9'	Stadium: Brisbane Road; Attendance: 8,140; Referee: Simon Mather

28 March 2026 40	Exeter City	0–0	Leyton Orient	Exeter
15:00 GMT	McMillan (yellow card) 81'; Aitchison (yellow card) 90+1'	Report	Happe (yellow card) 49'; Archibald (yellow card) 83'; Forrester (yellow card) 90+2'	Stadium: St James Park; Attendance: 6,772; Referee: Tim Robinson

2 April 2026 41	Wigan Athletic	0–0	Leyton Orient	Wigan
19:45 BST	Carragher (yellow card) 56'	Report	Happe (yellow card) 49'; Abdulai (yellow card) 64'	Stadium: Brick Community Stadium; Attendance: 9,239; Referee: Tom Reeves
Note: Fixture was initially scheduled for 3 April, but was brought forward to allow extra recovery time between games.

6 April 2026 42	Leyton Orient	1–2	Huddersfield Town	Leyton
15:00 BST	Balker 20' (o.g.); Archibald (yellow card) 90+1'; Morris (yellow card) 90+11'	Report	Harness (yellow card) 38'; Radulović 45'; McGuane (yellow card) 53'; Wallace (yellow card) 85'; Ledson 90+16'	Stadium: Brisbane Road; Attendance: 8,697; Referee: Matt Corlett

11 April 2026 43	Lincoln City	2–1	Leyton Orient	Lincoln
12:30 BST	Moylan 18'; House (yellow card) 31'; Darikwa (yellow card) 45+1'; Forrester 45+5' (o.g.)	Report	Morris (yellow card) 5'; El Mizouni (yellow card) 17'; Simpson (yellow card) 37'; Abdulai (yellow card) 65'; Ballard 71'	Stadium: Sincil Bank; Attendance: 9,919; Referee: Ross Joyce
Note: Fixture was initially scheduled for a 15:00 kick-off, but was brought forward for live Sky Sports broadcasting.

14 April 2026 32	Leyton Orient	0–0	Mansfield Town	Leyton
19:45 BST			Hewitt (yellow card) 80'	Stadium: Brisbane Road; Attendance: 7,941; Referee: Ross Martin
Note: Fixture was initially scheduled for 14 February, but it was postponed due to Mansfield's FA Cup progression to the fourth round.

18 April 2026 44	Leyton Orient	0–2	Rotherham United	Leyton
15:00 BST	Morris (yellow card) 85'	Report	Gray 24'; Lee (yellow card) 38'; Rafferty (yellow card) 68'; Nombe 73'; Martha (yellow card) 78'	Stadium: Brisbane Road; Attendance: 7,816; Referee: James Bell

25 April 2026 45	Blackpool	1–0	Leyton Orient	Blackpool
15:00 BST	Taylor (penalty missed) 22'; Dennis 22' (o.g.); Casey (yellow card) 45'	Report	Morris (yellow card) 45+1'; Clare (yellow card) 58'; Forrester (yellow card) 90+2'	Stadium: Bloomfield Road; Attendance: 10,735; Referee: Darren Drysdale

2 May 2026 46	Leyton Orient	2–2	Burton Albion	Leyton
15:00 BST	Forrester 2'; Ballard 51'; Morris (yellow card) 54'	Report	Tavares 34'; Evans (yellow card) 55'; Hartridge 58'	Stadium: Brisbane Road; Attendance: 8,544; Referee: Paul Howard

=== FA Cup ===
Leyton were drawn away to Tamworth in the first round and to Salford City in the second round.

Win Draw Loss Fixtures

3 November 2025 First round	Tamworth	0–1	Leyton Orient	Tamworth
19:30 GMT		Report	Beckles (yellow card) 57'; Abdulai (yellow card) 61'; Digie 79' (o.g.)	Stadium: The Lamb Ground; Referee: Matt Corlett

5 December 2025 Second round	Salford City	4–0	Leyton Orient	Kersal
19:30 GMT	Cahill 23' (o.g.); Cesay 61' (yellow card) 90+3'; Borini 87'; N'Mai 90+1'; Mnoga (yellow card) 90+5'	Report	Clare (yellow card) 53'; Bakinson (yellow card) 90+3'	Stadium: Moor Lane; Attendance: 1,796; Referee: Ben Speedie

=== EFL Cup ===
Orient were drawn at home to Wycombe Wanderers in the first round.

Win Draw Loss Fixtures

12 August 2025 First round	Leyton Orient	0–1	Wycombe Wanderers	Leyton
19:45 BST	Bakinson (yellow card) 4'	Report	Simpson 90+4' (o.g.); Back (yellow card) 90+5'; Gregory (yellow card) 90+7'	Stadium: Brisbane Road; Attendance: 3,293; Referee: Tom Nield

=== EFL Trophy ===
Leyton Orient were drawn against Crawley Town, Peterborough United and Aston Villa U21 in the group stage. After winning the group, Orient were drawn at home to Plymouth Argyle in the round of 32.

Pos	Div	Team	Pld	W	PW	PL	L	GF	GA	GD	Pts	Qualification
1	L1	Leyton Orient	3	3	0	0	0	6	2	+4	9	Advance to Round 2
2	L1	Peterborough United	3	2	0	0	1	7	6	+1	6	Advance to Round 2
3	L2	Crawley Town	3	1	0	0	2	6	6	0	3	
4	ACA	Aston Villa U21	3	0	0	0	3	4	9	−5	0	

Source: EFL

Win Draw Loss Fixtures

2 September 2025 South Group F	Peterborough United	1–3	Leyton Orient	Peterborough
19:00 BST	Dornelly (yellow card) 33'; Mills 45+2', (yellow card) 90'	Report	Abdulai (red card) 26'; Wellens 34'; Mitchell (yellow card) 55'; Moorhouse 57'; Craig 68'; Simpson (yellow card) 90+2'	Stadium: London Road Stadium; Attendance: 2,458; Referee: Alex Chilowicz

7 October 2025 South Group F	Leyton Orient	2–1	Crawley Town	Leyton
19:00 BST	Mitchell 40'; Edmonds-Green (yellow card) 49'; Connolly 90+3'	Report	Flower 3'; Anderson (yellow card) 38'; Malone (yellow card) 43'	Stadium: Brisbane Road; Attendance: 1,373; Referee: Darren Drysdale

28 October 2025 South Group F	Leyton Orient	1–0	Aston Villa U21	Leyton
19:00 GMT	Jaiyesimi 78'	Report		Stadium: Brisbane Road; Referee: Aaron Farmer

2 December 2025 Round of 32	Leyton Orient	0–1	Plymouth Argyle	Leyton
19:00 GMT	Koroma (yellow card) 39'; Obiero (yellow card) 54'	Report	Tolaj 90+3'	Stadium: Brisbane Road; Referee: Sam Mulhall

== Statistics ==
=== Appearances and goals ===
Players with no appearances are not included on the list; italics indicated loaned in player

No.	Pos	Nat	Player	Total		League One		FA Cup		EFL Cup		EFL Trophy	
No.	Pos	Nat	Player	Apps	Goals	Apps	Goals	Apps	Goals	Apps	Goals	Apps	Goals
2	DF	(Wales) WAL	Tom James	37	0	23+12	0	1+0	0	0+0	0	0+1	0
3	DF	(England) ENG	James Morris	17	2	17+0	2	0+0	0	0+0	0	0+0	0
4	DF	(England) ENG	Jack Simpson	41	2	25+10	2	1+0	0	1+0	0	2+2	0
5	DF	(England) ENG	Dan Happe	42	0	32+8	0	2+0	0	0+0	0	0+0	0
6	DF	(England) ENG	Will Forrester	17	1	17+0	1	0+0	0	0+0	0	0+0	0
7	FW	(Republic of Ireland) IRL	Ollie O'Neill	36	4	27+6	4	1+0	0	0+1	0	0+1	0
8	MF	(Tunisia) TUN	Idris El Mizouni	27	5	18+6	5	1+0	0	0+0	0	1+1	0
9	FW	(England) ENG	Ajay Matthews	4	0	2+2	0	0+0	0	0+0	0	0+0	0
10	FW	(Republic of Ireland) IRL	Aaron Connolly	24	9	20+1	8	2+0	0	0+0	0	0+1	1
11	MF	(England) ENG	Demetri Mitchell	33	2	18+11	1	0+0	0	1+0	0	2+1	1
12	GK	(England) ENG	Will Dennis	15	0	14+1	0	0+0	0	0+0	0	0+0	0
14	MF	(Scotland) SCO	Michael Craig	32	1	18+9	0	2+0	0	1+0	0	2+0	1
15	MF	(England) ENG	Tyreeq Bakinson	43	2	28+10	2	0+1	0	1+0	0	1+2	0
16	DF	(England) ENG	Kaelan Casey	16	0	9+7	0	0+0	0	0+0	0	0+0	0
17	FW	(Sierra Leone) SLE	Josh Koroma	38	3	16+17	3	1+1	0	0+0	0	2+1	0
18	DF	(England) ENG	Rarmani Edmonds-Green	9	0	3+3	0	0+0	0	1+0	0	2+0	0
20	FW	(England) ENG	Sonny Perkins	21	0	5+11	0	0+1	0	0+1	0	1+2	0
21	GK	(England) ENG	Tobi Oluwayemi	3	0	3+0	0	0+0	0	0+0	0	0+0	0
22	MF	(Scotland) SCO	Azeem Abdulai	41	1	18+19	1	2+0	0	1+0	0	1+0	0
23	FW	(England) ENG	Lemar Gordon	2	0	0+0	0	0+0	0	1+0	0	0+1	0
24	MF	(Wales) WAL	Dylan Levitt	8	1	7+1	1	0+0	0	0+0	0	0+0	0
25	MF	(England) ENG	Charlie Wellens	42	3	23+13	2	1+0	0	1+0	0	3+1	1
28	DF	(England) ENG	Sean Clare	39	0	26+8	0	2+0	0	0+0	0	1+2	0
32	FW	(England) ENG	Dom Ballard	44	23	40+0	23	2+0	0	0+0	0	1+1	0
33	GK	(Republic of Ireland) IRL	Killian Cahill	21	0	16+0	0	2+0	0	1+0	0	2+0	0
35	MF	(England) ENG	Zack Hambury	2	0	0+0	0	0+0	0	0+0	0	0+2	0
44	MF	(Scotland) SCO	Theo Archibald	24	2	14+9	2	0+0	0	0+0	0	1+0	0
Player(s) who featured but departed out on loan:
27	FW	(England) ENG	Diallang Jaiyesimi	12	1	4+4	0	0+0	0	0+1	0	2+1	1
29	MF	(Kenya) KEN	Zech Obiero	8	0	1+4	0	0+0	0	0+1	0	1+1	0
31	MF	(Jamaica) JAM	Makai Welch	1	0	0+0	0	0+0	0	0+0	0	0+1	0
34	DF	(England) ENG	Phillip Chinedu	3	0	0+1	0	0+0	0	0+0	0	2+0	0
Player(s) who featured but departed the club during the season:
1	GK	(England) ENG	Tommy Simkin	15	0	13+0	0	0+0	0	0+0	0	2+0	0
3	DF	(Republic of Ireland) IRL	Tayo Adaramola	19	0	14+1	0	0+1	0	0+1	0	2+0	0
9	FW	(England) ENG	Alfie Lloyd	12	0	1+7	0	0+2	0	0+0	0	2+0	0
19	DF	(Grenada) GRN	Omar Beckles	26	0	20+2	0	2+0	0	0+0	0	2+0	0
19	FW	(England) ENG	Favour Fawunmi	7	0	4+3	0	0+0	0	0+0	0	0+0	0
21	MF	(Republic of Ireland) IRL	Jack Moorhouse	24	1	10+10	0	0+0	0	1+0	0	2+1	1
30	MF	(England) ENG	Joe White	6	0	0+3	0	0+0	0	1+0	0	0+2	0
