= George Dowling =

English association football player

Personal information
- Full name: George Philip Denzil Dowling
- Date of birth: 1 August 1998 (age 28)
- Place of birth: Bedminster, Bristol, England
- Height: 1.73 m (5 ft 8 in)
- Position: Midfielder

Team information
- Current team: Frome Town

Youth career
- 2006–2016: Bristol City

Senior career*
Years	Team	Apps	(Gls)
2016–2019	Bristol City	2	(0)
2016	→ Weston-super-Mare (loan)	8	(0)
2017–2018	→ Torquay United (loan)	21	(2)
2018	→ Eastleigh (loan)	2	(0)
2018–2019	→ Weston-super-Mare (loan)	3	(0)
2019	Weston-super-Mare		
2019–2025	Swindon Supermarine		
2025–	Frome Town		
- * Club domestic league appearances and goals as of 1 July 2025

George Philip Denzil Dowling (born 1 August 1998) is an English professional footballer who plays as a midfielder for Frome Town.

== Club career ==
Having watched his first match at Ashton Gate at the age of six, George Dowling grew up supporting Bristol City. He then joined the club's academy when he was just eight years old and signed his first professional contract on 27 October 2015. He made his debut for the club on 30 April 2016, coming on as a 70th-minute substitute for Bobby Reid in a 4–0 Championship win over Huddersfield Town.

On 4 August 2016, six players, including Dowling were loaned out by Bristol City on short-term deals. Dowling and teammate Shawn McCoulsky both joined National League South side Weston-super-Mare on a two-month loan period. He made his debut for the club two days later in a 3–1 win over Whitehawk and made a total of eight appearances before returning to Bristol.

Following the expiration of his loan with Weston–super–Mare, Dowling returned to Bristol where he continued to play for the club's U23 side. On 11 May 2017, he started and scored in a comeback victory over Barnet's U23 side which saw Bristol lift the Central League Cup (South) trophy.

On 31 August 2017, Dowling joined National League side Torquay United on an initial one-month loan deal. Despite enduring an injury-ridden spell, Dowling's loan was later extended until the end of the season.

On 17 July 2018, Dowling joined National League side Eastleigh on loan until January 2019. On 21 December 2018, he was loaned out to Weston-super-Mare for one month.

On 3 February 2019, Dowling was found guilty of grievous bodily harm. He was released by Bristol City in the summer of 2019. On 19 September 2019, Dowling returned to Weston-super-Mare. He left the club on 18 December 2019 to join fellow league side Swindon Supermarine.

== Career statistics ==
As of match played 14 April 2018

Appearances and goals by club, season and competition
Club	Season	League			FA Cup		League Cup		Other		Total	
Club	Season	Division	Apps	Goals	Apps	Goals	Apps	Goals	Apps	Goals	Apps	Goals
Bristol City	2015–16	Championship	2	0	0	0	0	0	—		2	0
Bristol City	2016–17	Championship	0	0	0	0	0	0	—		0	0
Bristol City	2017–18	Championship	0	0	0	0	0	0	—		0	0
Bristol City	Total		2	0	0	0	0	0	—		2	0
Weston-super-Mare (loan)	2016–17	National League South	3	0	0	0	—		0	0	3	0
Torquay United (loan)	2017–18	National League	21	2	0	0	—		1 (Note: Appearance in the FA Trophy)	0	22	2
Career total			26	2	0	0	0	0	1	0	27	2
