= Idris El Mizouni =

Tunisian footballer (born 2000)

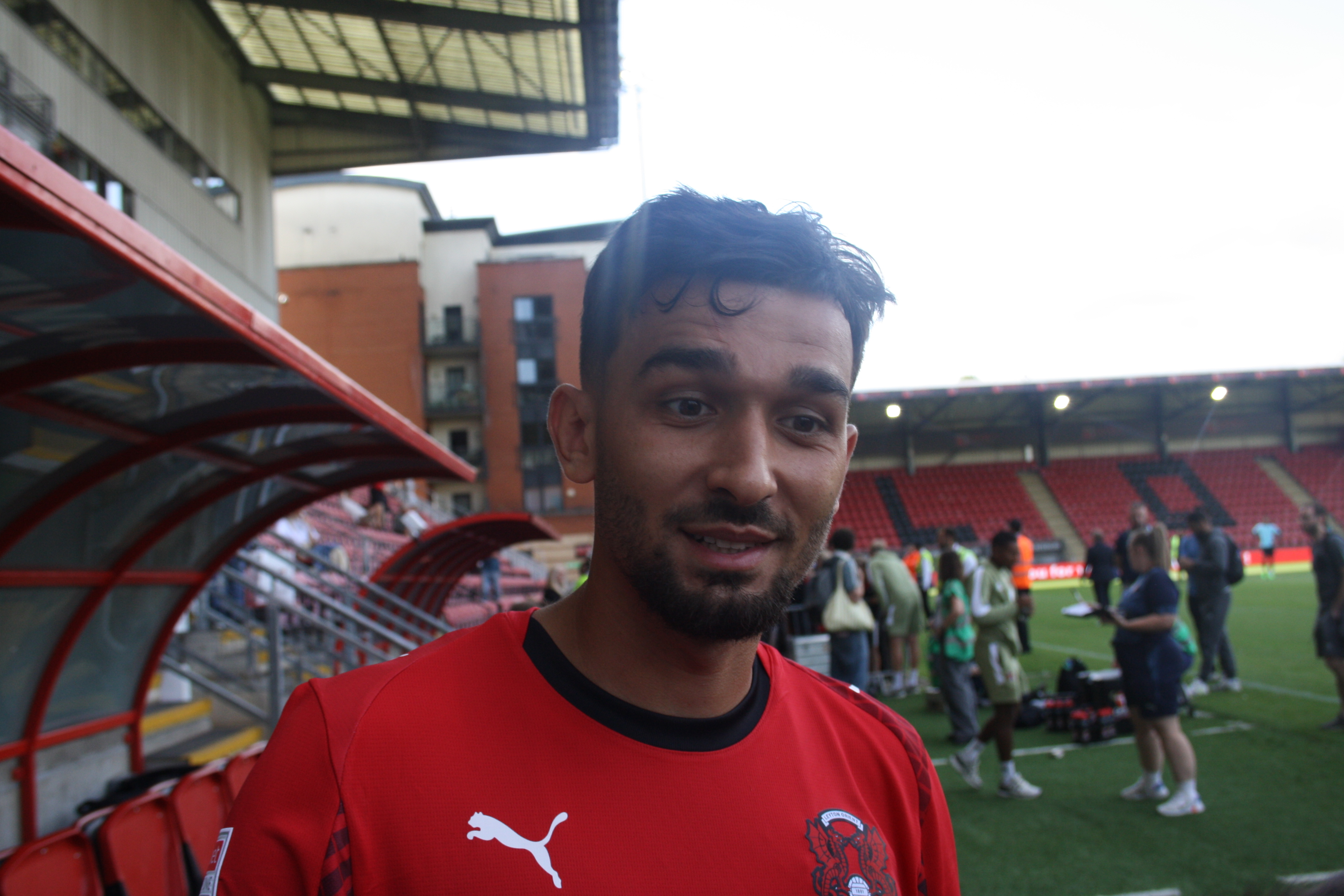
- El Mizouni in 2025

Personal information
- Full name: Idris El Mizouni
- Date of birth: 26 September 2000 (age 26)
- Place of birth: Paris, France
- Height: 6 ft 1 in (1.85 m)
- Position: Attacking midfielder

Team information
- Current team: Leyton Orient
- Number: 8

Youth career
- ACBB
- AS Meudon
- 2017–2019: Ipswich Town

Senior career*
Years	Team	Apps	(Gls)
2019–2024	Ipswich Town	12	(0)
2019–2020	→ Cambridge United (loan)	7	(1)
2020	→ Cambridge United (loan)	11	(0)
2021	→ Grimsby Town (loan)	6	(0)
2022–2024	→ Leyton Orient (loan)	81	(4)
2024–2025	Oxford United	28	(1)
2025–	Leyton Orient	36	(5)

International career^{‡}
2018	Tunisia U23	2	(1)
2019–2024	Tunisia	2	(0)
- * Club domestic league appearances and goals as of 16:44, 25 October 2026 (UTC) ‡ National team caps and goals as of 19:30, 20 November 2024 (UTC)

Idris El Mizouni (born 26 September 2000) is a professional footballer who plays as an attacking midfielder for EFL League One club Leyton Orient. Born in France, he has played for the Tunisia national team.

== Club career ==
=== Ipswich Town ===
Born in Paris, El Mizouni came through the academy at Ipswich. He signed his first professional contract on 20 December 2018, signing a two-and-a-half-year contract at Ipswich until 2021, with the option of an additional year extension. He made his professional debut for the club on 12 March 2019, in a 1–1 draw against Bristol City at Ashton Gate. El Mizouni made four appearances in his debut season at Portman Road, having progressed through the club's under-18 and under-23 sides into the first team over the course of the 2018–19 season. His progress earned him his first call up to the senior Tunisia squad in June 2019, making him the first player in the club's history to be capped for Tunisia at senior level.

He scored his first professional goal on 4 December 2019, scoring the opening goal in a 1–1 draw with Peterborough United at the London Road Stadium in an EFL Trophy second round tie, with Ipswich going on to win the match 6–5 on penalties.

==== Cambridge United (loans) ====
On 23 January 2020, El Mizouni joined League Two club Cambridge United on loan for the remainder of the 2019–20 season. He made his debut for the club on 25 January, appearing as a second-half substitute in a 1–1 draw with Morecambe. He scored his first goal on 11 February, netting a 20-yard free-kick in a 0–2 away win over Scunthorpe United. His loan spell at Cambridge was ended on 2 March after suffering medial ligament damage to his knee during a 2–1 loss to Carlisle United on 29 February, ruling him out of action for the rest of the season. He made seven appearances during his loan spell at the club, scoring once.

On 22 September 2020, El Mizouni rejoined Cambridge United on a season-long loan for the 2020–21 season. He made his first appearance of the 2020–21 season as a second-half substitute in a 0–0 draw with Tranmere Rovers on 26 September. He did not feature as regularly during his second loan with Cambridge, only making three league starts between September and December. On 3 January, Ipswich took the option to recall El Mizouni from his loan spell. He made 15 appearances in all competitions during his second loan at Cambridge.

==== Grimsby Town (loan) ====
On 29 January 2021, El Mizouni joined Grimsby Town on loan for the rest of the 2020–21 season. He made his debut for Grimsby the following day in a match against Stevenage. In March, El Mizouni suffered a hamstring injury, potentially ruling him out for the remainder of the season.

==== Return to Ipswich ====
On 10 May 2021, Ipswich announced that they had taken up the option to extend El Mizouni's contract by an additional year, keeping him under contract until 2022. On 9 November 2021, El Mizouni signed a new two-and-a-half-year contract with Ipswich, keeping him at the club until 2024, with the option of an additional one-year extension. The following match after signing his new contract, he scored a stunning winner from 30 yards out in a 2–1 win against Oldham Athletic in an FA Cup first round replay, with the goal winning him the Goal of the Round award and a place in the Team of the Round for the FA Cup first round.

==== Leyton Orient (loan) ====
On 12 August 2022, El Mizouni joined League Two Leyton Orient on loan for the 2022–23 season. Leyton Orient won League Two. On 5 July 2023, it was announced that he would be loaned to Orient again for the whole of 2023–24, this time in League One.

On 3 June 2024, Ipswich said it had extended the player's contract by another 12 months.

=== Oxford United ===
On 9 July 2024, El Mizouni signed for EFL Championship side Oxford United.

=== Return to Leyton Orient ===
On 4 July 2025, El Mizouni returned to League One side Leyton Orient on a permanent three-year deal for an undisclosed club record fee.

== International career ==
Mizouni was born in France and qualifies to play for Tunisia at international level through his father. In 2018 he was called up to the Tunisia Olympic squad for friendlies in preparation for the Africa U-23 Cup of Nations qualifiers. He won his first cap in a friendly match against Italy U23 in Vicenza on 15 October 2018. He scored his first international goal in a 4–1 loss to Egypt U23 on 15 November 2018.

He made his senior international debut in a friendly on 7 June 2019, coming on as an 81st-minute substitute in a 2–0 win over Iraq at the Stade Olympique de Rades stadium in Radès. After making his international debut for his country, he stated "I'm really proud to have been called up, to be able to wear the shirt fills me with pride and happiness."

== Career statistics ==
=== Club ===
As of match played 15 November 2025

Appearances and goals by club, season and competition
Club	Season	Division	League		FA Cup		EFL Cup		Other		Total	
Club	Season	Division	Apps	Goals	Apps	Goals	Apps	Goals	Apps	Goals	Apps	Goals
Ipswich Town	2018–19	Championship	4	0	0	0	0	0	—		4	0
Ipswich Town	2019–20	League One	3	0	1	0	0	0	5 (Note: Appearances in EFL Trophy)	1	9	1
Ipswich Town	2020–21	League One	0	0	0	0	0	0	0	0	0	0
Ipswich Town	2021–22	League One	5	0	3	1	1	0	3	0	12	1
Ipswich Town	2022–23	League One	0	0	0	0	1	0	0	0	1	0
Ipswich Town	Total		12	0	4	1	2	0	8	1	26	2
Cambridge United (loan)	2019–20	League Two	7	1	0	0	0	0	0	0	7	1
Cambridge United (loan)	2020–21	League Two	11	0	1	0	0	0	3	0	15	0
Cambridge United (loan)	Total		18	1	1	0	0	0	3	0	22	1
Grimsby Town (loan)	2020–21	League Two	6	0	0	0	0	0	0	0	6	0
Leyton Orient (loan)	2022–23	League Two	41	3	1	0	0	0	2	0	44	3
Leyton Orient (loan)	2023–24	League One	40	1	2	0	1	0	2	1	45	2
Leyton Orient (loan)	Total		81	4	3	0	1	0	4	1	89	5
Oxford United	2024–25	Championship	25	1	1	0	2	0	0	0	28	1
Leyton Orient	2025–26	League One	14	4	1	0	0	0	2	0	17	4
Career total			156	10	10	1	5	0	17	2	188	13

=== International ===
As of match played 7 June 2019

Appearances and goals by national team and year
National team	Year	Apps	Goals
Tunisia	2019	1	0
Total		1	0

== Honours ==
Leyton Orient

- EFL League Two: 2022–23

Individual

- EFL League Two Team of the Season: 2022–23
- PFA Team of the Year: 2022–23 League Two
- Leyton Orient Players’ Player of the Season: 2022–23
