= 2024–25 Rotherham United F.C. season =

100th season in existence of Rotherham United FC

Rotherham United
2024–25 season
- Chairman: Tony Stewart
- Manager: Steve Evans (until 30 March); Matt Hamshaw (from 30 March)
- Stadium: New York Stadium
- League One: 13th
- FA Cup: First round
- EFL Cup: Second round
- EFL Trophy: Quarter-finals
- Top goalscorer: League: Jonson Clarke-Harris; Sam Nombe (4 each); All: Jordan Hugill; Sam Nombe (5 each)
- Average home league attendance: 9,359
Home colours	Away colours	Third colours

The 2024–25 season is the 100th season in the history of Rotherham United Football Club and their first season back in League One since the 2021–22 season, following relegation from the Championship in the previous season. In addition to the domestic league, the club would also participate in the FA Cup, the EFL Cup, and the EFL Trophy.

== Transfers ==
=== In ===
Date	Pos.	Player	From	Fee	Ref.
1 July 2024 (Note: The transfer was announced on 15 May, and would become official on July 1 once his Peterborough United contract expired)	CF	Jonson Clarke-Harris (JAM)	Peterborough United (ENG)	Free	
1 July 2024 (Note: The transfer was announced on 24 June, and would become official on July 1 once his Sheffield Wednesday contract expired)	GK	Cameron Dawson (ENG)	Sheffield Wednesday (ENG)	Free	
1 July 2024 (Note: The transfer was announced on 22 May, and would become official on July 1 once his Sheffield Wednesday contract expired)	LB	Reece James (ENG)	Sheffield Wednesday (ENG)	Free	
1 July 2024 (Note: The transfer was announced on 18 June, and would become official on July 1 once his Exeter City contract expired)	CB	Zak Jules (SCO)	Exeter City (ENG)	Free	
1 July 2024 (Note: The transfer was announced on 31 May, and would become official on July 1 once his Coventry City contract expired)	CM	Liam Kelly (SCO)	Coventry City (ENG)	Free	
1 July 2024 (Note: The transfer was announced on 24 June, and would become official on July 1 once his Stevenage contract expired)	RM	Alex MacDonald (SCO)	Stevenage (ENG)	Free	
1 July 2024 (Note: The transfer was announced on 20 May, and would become official on July 1 once his Northampton Town contract expired)	CM	Shaun McWilliams (ENG)	Northampton Town (ENG)	Free	
1 July 2024 (Note: The transfer was announced on 29 May, and would become official on July 1 once his Burton Albion contract expired)	AM	Joe Powell (ENG)	Burton Albion (ENG)	Free	
1 July 2024 (Note: The transfer was announced on 20 May, and would become official on July 1 once his Portsmouth contract expired)	RB	Joe Rafferty (IRL)	Portsmouth (ENG)	Free	
1 July 2024 (Note: The transfer was announced on 24 May, and would become official on July 1 once his Portsmouth contract expired)	CB	Sean Raggett (ENG)	Portsmouth (ENG)	Free	
27 July 2024	RM	Jack Holmes (ENG)	Stamford (ENG)	Free	

=== Out ===
Date	Pos.	Player	To	Fee	Ref.
14 June 2024 (Note: The transfer was announced on 18 May, and would become official on June 14 once the transfer window re-opens)	GK	Viktor Johansson (SWE)	Stoke City (ENG)	Undisclosed	
24 June 2024	RB	Peter Kioso (IRL)	Oxford United (ENG)	Undisclosed	
9 August 2024	CM	Oliver Rathbone (ENG)	Wrexham (WAL)	Undisclosed	
3 January 2025	CB	Jamie McCart (SCO)	Heart of Midlothian (SCO)	Undisclosed	
11 January 2025	DM	Christ Tiéhi (CIV)	Diósgyőri (HUN)	Undisclosed	
31 January 2025	LB	Cohen Bramall (ENG)	Portsmouth (ENG)	Undisclosed	

=== Loaned in ===
Date	Pos.	Player	From	Date until	Ref.
10 July 2024	RW	Joseph Hungbo (ENG)	1. FC Nürnberg (GER)	3 January 2025 (Note: On 3 January, Hungbo was recalled back to Nürnberg)	
18 July 2024	CF	Esapa Osong (ENG)	Nottingham Forest (ENG)	2 January 2025 (Note: On 2 January, Esapa Osong was recalled back to Nottingham Forest)	
15 August 2024	RW	Mallik Wilks (ENG)	Sheffield Wednesday (ENG)	End of Season	
24 January 2025	CM	Louie Sibley (ENG)	Oxford United (ENG)	End of Season	
31 January 2025	CM	Dan Gore (ENG)	Manchester United (ENG)	End of Season	
3 February 2025	DM	Pelly Ruddock Mpanzu (COD)	Luton Town (ENG)	End of Season	

=== Loaned out ===
Date	Pos.	Player	To	Date until	Ref.
26 July 2024	CF	Joshua Kayode (IRL)	Shrewsbury Town (ENG)	12 January 2025 (Note: On 12 January, Kayode was recalled back from his loan at Shrewsbury)	
10 August 2024	CF	Josh Ayres (ENG)	Buxton (ENG)	7 September 2024	
19 September 2024	CF	Ciaran McGuckin (NIR)	Yeovil Town (ENG)	25 October 2024 (Note: On 25 October, McGuckin was recalled back from his loat at Yeovil)	
4 October 2024	CB	Hamish Douglas (ENG)	Warrington Town (ENG)	8 April 2025 (Note: On 7 November, Douglas' loan at Warrington was extended by a further two-months Then on 17 January it was extended again for a further month Then on 27 February, it was extended until the end of season. On 8 April, he was then recalled back to the club)	
29 October 2024	CF	Josh Ayres (ENG)	Sheffield (ENG)	1 January 2025 (Note: On 4 December, Ayres' loan at Sheffield was extended until January, Then on 3 January, it was extended again for a further month)	
8 February 2025	CF	Josh Ayres (ENG)	Matlock Town (ENG)	18 March 2025 (Note: On 18 March, Ayres was recalled back from his loan at Matlock)	
13 March 2025	CM	Ben Hatton (ENG)	Warrington Town (ENG)	End of Season	
20 March 2025	CF	Josh Ayres (ENG)	Emley (ENG)	17 April 2025	

=== Released / Out of Contract ===
Date	Pos.	Player	Subsequent club	Join date	Ref.
30 June 2024	RM	Curtis Durose (ENG)	Matlock Town (ENG)	4 July 2024	
30 June 2024	CB	Grant Hall (ENG)	Swindon Town (ENG)	10 July 2024	
30 June 2024	CM	Jamie Lindsay (SCO)	Bristol Rovers (ENG)	12 July 2024	
12 July 2024	CF	Tom Eaves (ENG)	Northampton Town (ENG)	12 July 2024	
30 June 2024	GK	Nathaniel Ford (ENG)	FC Halifax Town (ENG)	9 August 2024	
30 June 2024	CM	Cafú (POR)	Kasımpaşa (TUR)	10 August 2024	
30 June 2024	CM	Sam Clucas (ENG)	Oldham Athletic (ENG)	31 October 2024	
30 June 2024	LM	Shane Ferguson (NIR)	Derry City (NIR)	11 December 2024	
30 June 2024	LB	Tyler Blackett (ENG)			
30 June 2024	LB	Tolaji Bola (ENG)			
30 June 2024	CM	Joel Holvey (ENG)			
30 June 2024	CB	Sean Morrison (ENG)			
30 June 2024	RB	Lee Peltier (ENG)			

== Pre-season and friendlies ==
On 24 May, Rotherham confirmed their first pre-season friendly, against Sheffield United. Six days later, a second friendly was announced with the annually meeting with Parkgate. Alfreton Town was later confirmed as a third pre-season opponent. On 10 June, a trip to face Spalding United was added to the schedule. Two days later, Doncaster Rovers were added to the schedule. A sixth and seventh was confirmed with trips to Grimsby Town and Stamford.

Win Draw Loss Fixtures

5 July 2024 Friendly	Parkgate	0–7	Rotherham United	Parkgate
19:00 BST		Report	Kayode 11', 24'; Nombe 50', 57', 60', 68'; Eaves 64'	Stadium: Roundwood Sports Complex

13 July 2024 Friendly	Cove Rangers	0–1	Rotherham United	St Andrews, Scotland
14:00 BST		Report	Own goal	Stadium: University of St Andrews

19 July 2024 Friendly	Stamford	2–4	Rotherham United	Stamford
19:30 BST	Simms; Holmes 48'	Report	Trialist (?), 61'; Hugill 51'; Jules 68'	Stadium: Zeeco Stadium

20 July 2024 Friendly	Spalding United	1–1	Rotherham United	Spalding
15:00 BST	5'		Nombe 12'	Stadium: Sir Halley Stewart Field

23 July 2024 Friendly	Alfreton Town	0–3	Rotherham United	Alfreton
19:30 BST		Report	Trialist 31'; Odoffin 49'; Powell 53'	Stadium: North Street; Attendance: 501

27 July 2024 Friendly	Rotherham United	1–2	Sheffield United	Rotherham
15:00 BST	Hungbo 47'	Report	Souza 10'; Marsh 89'	Stadium: New York Stadium; Attendance: 6,291; Referee: Darren Drysdale

30 July 2024 Friendly	Grimsby Town	2–2	Rotherham United	Cleethorpes
19:30 BST	Rodgers 2'; Gardner 87'	Report	Clarke-Harris 13', 55' (pen.)	Stadium: Blundell Park; Attendance: 2,017

3 August 2024 Friendly	Rotherham United	0–0	Doncaster Rovers	Rotherham
15:00 BST		Report		Stadium: New York Stadium; Attendance: 4,816; Referee: Thomas Bramall
Note: Richard Wood's testimonial match

27 November 2024 Friendly	Doncaster Rovers	2–3	Rotherham United	Doncaster
		Report		Stadium: Eco-Power Stadium; Attendance: 0 (Behind closed doors)

19 March 2025 Friendly	Leyton Orient	3–0	Southampton XI	Leyton
15:00 GMT	Clare 8'; O'Neill 44'; Hambury 90'	Report		Stadium: Brisbane Road; Attendance: 0 (Behind closed doors)

== Competitions ==
=== League One ===
==== League table ====
Pos	Team	Pld	W	D	L	GF	GA	GD	Pts
11	Lincoln City	46	16	13	17	64	56	+8	61
12	Barnsley	46	17	10	19	69	73	−4	61
13	Rotherham United	46	16	11	19	54	59	−5	59
14	Stevenage	46	15	12	19	42	50	−8	57
15	Wigan Athletic	46	13	17	16	40	42	−2	56

Source: EFL Official Website
Rules for classification: 1) Points; 2) Goal difference; 3) Number of goals scored; 4) Head-to-head results; 5) Wins; 6) Away goals; 7) Penalty points (sec 9.5); 8) 12-point sending off offences

==== Results summary ====
Overall								Home						Away					
Pld	W	D	L	GF	GA	GD	Pts	W	D	L	GF	GA	GD	W	D	L	GF	GA	GD
45	15	11	19	52	58	−6	56	10	5	7	33	29	+4	5	6	12	19	29	−10

Last updated: 27 April 2025.
Source: Soccerway

==== Results by round ====
Round	1	2	3	4	5	6	7	8	9	10	11	12	13	14	15	17	18	20	21	22	23	24	25	16^{1}	27	28	29	30	31	19^{2}	32	33	34	35	36	37	26^{3}	39	40	41	38^{4}	42	43	44	45	46
Ground	A	H	A	H	A	H	H	A	A	H	A	H	A	H	A	A	H	H	A	H	H	A	A	H	H	A	H	A	H	A	A	H	A	H	A	H	H	H	A	H	A	A	H	A	A	H
Result	L	D	L	W	D	D	L	D	W	W	D	L	L	W	L	L	W	W	L	L	D	W	D	W	W	L	W	L	L	D	L	L	W	W	L	D	L	L	W	W	W	L	D	L	D	W
Position	20	18	21	17	15	17	21	19	17	17	15	16	17	14	15	18	18	17	18	18	17	17	16	15	13	13	13	15	15	14	14	14	14	14	14	14	14	16	15	14	12	13	13	13	13	13
Points	0	1	1	4	5	6	6	7	10	13	14	14	14	17	17	17	20	23	23	23	24	27	28	31	34	34	37	37	37	38	38	38	41	44	44	45	45	45	48	51	54	54	55	55	56	59

Source: EFL
A = Away; H = Home; W = Win; D = Draw; L = Loss; P = Postponed
Notes:
- ^{1} Matchday 16 (vs. Bolton Wanderers) was postponed due to international call-ups.
- ^{2} Matchday 19 (vs. Blackpool) was postponed due to safery concerns from Storm Darragh.
- ^{3} Matchday 26 (vs. Wycombe Wanderers) was postponed due to Wycombe's FA Cup involvements.
- ^{4} Matchday 38 (vs. Bolton Wanderers) was postponed due to international call-ups.

==== Matches ====
On 26 June, the League One fixtures were announced.

Win Draw Loss Fixtures

10 August 2024 1	Exeter City	1–0	Rotherham United	Exeter
17:30 BST	Yfeko (yellow card) 64'; Watts 71'; Borges (yellow card) 90+3'	Report	Raggett (yellow card) 81'	Stadium: St James Park; Referee: Paul Howard

17 August 2024 2	Rotherham United	0–0	Bristol Rovers	Rotherham
15:00 BST	MacDonald (yellow card) 12'; McCart (yellow card) 32'; Clarke-Harris (yellow card) 80'	Report	Sotiriou (yellow card) 44'; Moore (yellow card) 90'	Stadium: New York Stadium; Attendance: 9,414; Referee: Neil Hair

24 August 2024 3	Wycombe Wanderers	2–0	Rotherham United	High Wycombe
15:00 BST	Scowen (yellow card) 8'; Humphreys 70'; Sadlier 87' (pen.)	Report	McCart (yellow card) 23'; Wilks (yellow card) 25'	Stadium: Adams Park; Attendance: 4,272; Referee: Carl Brook

31 August 2024 4	Rotherham United	2–1	Huddersfield Town	Rotherham
12:30 BST	Tiéhi (yellow card) 45+2'; Clarke-Harris 77' (pen.); Wilks 90', (yellow card) 90+1'	Report	Lonwijk (yellow card) 9'; Evans (yellow card) 47'; Sørensen (yellow card) 68'; Ward (red card) 72'; Hodge 74'	Stadium: New York Stadium; Attendance: 10,404; Referee: Seb Stockbridge
Note: Fixture was initially scheduled for a 15:00 kick-off, but was moved for live Sky Sports broadcast.

7 September 2024 5	Charlton Athletic	1–1	Rotherham United	Charlton
15:00 BST	Mitchell (yellow card) 43'; Aneke 72'	Report	Kelly 58'	Stadium: The Valley; Attendance: 13,569; Referee: Simon Mather

14 September 2024 6	Rotherham United	2–2	Burton Albion	Rotherham
15:00 BST	Clarke-Harris 39'; Humphreys 57'; Odoffin (yellow card) 74'	Report	Orsi 25'; Vancooten (yellow card) 54'; Cooper Love 71'	Stadium: New York Stadium; Attendance: 8,704; Referee: Ben Speedie

21 September 2024 7	Rotherham United	0–2	Birmingham City	Rotherham
15:00 GMT	Tiéhi (yellow card) 26'; Hungbo (yellow card) 78'; Raggett (yellow card) 83'	Report	Iwata (yellow card) 13', (goal) 14'; Stansfield 22'; Cochrane (yellow card) 75'	Stadium: New York Stadium; Attendance: 10,335; Referee: Edward Duckworth

28 September 2024 8	Shrewsbury Town	1–1	Rotherham United	Shrewsbury
15:00 GMT	Lloyd 22'; Benning (yellow card) 69'; Feeney (yellow card) 88'	Report	James (yellow card) 25'; Wilks (yellow card) 33'; Clarke-Harris 70' (pen.)	Stadium: New Meadow; Attendance: 6,001; Referee: Sam Purkiss

1 October 2024 9	Cambridge United	0–1	Rotherham United	Cambridge
19:45 GMT	Digby (yellow card) 32'; Brophy (yellow card) 64'; Nlundulu (yellow card) 76'; Loft (yellow card) 90+4'	Report	Nombe 90+2'; Hugill (yellow card) 90+4'	Stadium: Abbey Stadium; Attendance: 5,085; Referee: Darren Drysdale

5 October 2024 10	Rotherham United	2–1	Reading	Rotherham
15:00 BST	Nombe 49', (yellow card) 90+2'; Odoffin 56'; James (yellow card) 61'; Dawson (yellow card) 77'	Report	Wing 26'; Garcia (yellow card) 44'; Ehibhatiomhan (yellow card) 47' (yellow-red card) 68'; Smith (yellow card) 57'; Craig (yellow card) 83'	Stadium: New York Stadium; Attendance: 8,907; Referee: Ben Toner

12 October 2024 11	Peterborough United	3–3	Rotherham United	Peterborough
15:00 BST	Dornelly 17', (yellow card) 32'; Wallin (yellow card) 22'; Randall (yellow card) 48'; Rafferty 50' (o.g.); Fernandez 53'	Report	Nombe 19'; Wilks 23', (yellow card) 35'; Clarke-Harris 45+1'	Stadium: London Road Stadium; Attendance: 8,859; Referee: Elliot Bell

19 October 2024 12	Rotherham United	0–1	Wrexham	Rotherham
15:00 BST	Powell (yellow card) 75'	Report	Mullin 1', (yellow card) 45+3'; Scarr (yellow card) 45+1'; Palmer (yellow card) 53'	Stadium: New York Stadium; Attendance: 11,235; Referee: Ben Atkinson

22 October 2024 13	Leyton Orient	1–0	Rotherham United	Leyton
19:45 BST	Kelman (yellow card) 45+2'; Happe 68'; James (yellow card) 75'	Report	Powell (yellow card) 61'	Stadium: Brisbane Road; Attendance: 6,314; Referee: Alex Chilowicz

26 October 2024 14	Rotherham United	2–0	Stevenage	Rotherham
15:00 BST	Odoffin (yellow card) 25'; Tiéhi (yellow card) 45'; Hugill 70'; Wilks 72'; Rafferty (yellow card) 90+1'	Report	Freestone (yellow card) 49'; King (yellow card) 54'; Pressley (yellow card) 90+2'	Stadium: New York Stadium; Attendance: 8,896; Referee: Sunny Singh Gill

8 November 2024 15	Barnsley	2–0	Rotherham United	Barnsley
19:15 GMT	Russell 32'; Humphrys 86'; Connell (yellow card) 89'	Report	Kelly (yellow card) 76'	Stadium: Oakwell; Attendance: 14,731; Referee: Thomas Kirk
Note: Fixture was initially scheduled for 9 November, but was moved for live Sky Sports broadcast. The fixture was later moved again to mitigate the risk of a possible postponement due to international call-ups.

23 November 2024 17	Crawley Town	1–0	Rotherham United	Crawley
15:00 GMT	Swan 21'; Anderson (yellow card) 46'; Mullarkey (yellow card) 57'; Wollacott (yellow card) 84'	Report	McWilliams (yellow card) 60'; Raggett (yellow card) 90'	Stadium: Broadfield Stadium; Attendance: 3,631; Referee: Matthew Corlett

3 December 2024 18	Rotherham United	2–1	Lincoln City	Rotherham
19:45 GMT	Nombe 21'; Jules (yellow card) 48'; Rafferty (yellow card) 56'; Raggett 77'; Odoffin (yellow card) 90+6'	Report	Makama 50'; Darikwa (yellow card) 60'; Erhahon (yellow card) 68'; Hackett (yellow card) 90+7'; Draper (yellow card) 90+8'	Stadium: New York Stadium; Attendance: 8,995; Referee: Martin Woods

14 December 2024 20	Rotherham United	3–0	Northampton Town	Rotherham
15:00 GMT	Clarke-Harris 3', 34'; Green 49'; Powell (yellow card) 54'	Report	Hoskins (yellow card) 44'; Waghorn (yellow card) 72'	Stadium: New York Stadium; Attendance: 8,745; Referee: Elliot Bell

21 December 2024 21	Mansfield Town	1–0	Rotherham United	Mansfield
15:00 GMT	Oshilaja 27'; Lewis (yellow card) 59'	Report		Stadium: Field Mill; Attendance: 8,401; Referee: Zac Kennard-Kettle

26 December 2024 22	Rotherham United	0–1	Wigan Athletic	Rotherham
15:00 GMT	Rafferty (yellow card) 55'	Report	Adeeko 45+3'; Weir (yellow card) 90+3'	Stadium: New York Stadium; Attendance: 9,509; Referee: Martin Coy

29 December 2024 23	Rotherham United	1–1	Stockport County	Rotherham
12:30 GMT	Odoffin 19', (yellow card) 39'; Jules (yellow card) 35'; Clarke-Harris (yellow card) 41'	Report	Barry 13'; Wootton (yellow card) 38'; Connolly (yellow card) 40'	Stadium: New York Stadium; Attendance: 10,194; Referee: Leigh Doughty
Note: Fixture was initially scheduled for a 15:00 kick-off, but was moved for live Sky Sports broadcast.

1 January 2025 24	Lincoln City	0–1	Rotherham United	Lincoln
15:00 GMT		Report	Rafferty (yellow card) 75'; Powell 85'	Stadium: Sincil Bank; Attendance: 9,222; Referee: Ben Speedie

4 January 2025 25	Huddersfield Town	0–0	Rotherham United	Huddersfield
15:00 GMT	Lees (yellow card) 54'; Wiles (yellow card) 65'; Roosken (red card) 82'	Report	Jules (yellow card) 31'; Nombe (yellow card) 89'	Stadium: Kirklees Stadium; Attendance: 18,353; Referee: Alex Chilowicz

11 January 2025 16	Rotherham United	3–1	Bolton Wanderers	Rotherham
12:30 GMT	Humphreys (yellow card) 15'; Wilks 34' (pen.); James 45+6'; Nombe 76'	Report	Santos (yellow card) 33'; McAtee 86'	Stadium: New York Stadium; Attendance: 10,258; Referee: Alan Young
Note: Fixture was originally scheduled for 16 November, but was postponed due to international call-ups within the Bolton squad.

18 January 2025 27	Rotherham United	4–2	Charlton Athletic	Rotherham
15:00 GMT	Green 9'; MacDonald 14'; Jules 45+4'; Wilks 53'		Leaburn 45'; Godden 90+2'	Stadium: New York Stadium; Attendance: 9,589; Referee: Darren Drysdale

25 January 2025 28	Burton Albion	4–2	Rotherham United	Burton upon Trent
15:00 GMT	Böðvarsson 8', 41'; McKiernan (yellow card) 27', (goal) 47'; Sweeney 39'; Armer (yellow card) 67'	Report	Sibley 2'; Green 61'	Stadium: Pirelli Stadium; Attendance: 3,733; Referee: Tom Reeves

28 January 2025 29	Rotherham United	2–1	Cambridge United	Rotherham
19:45 GMT	Wilks 53'; Sibley (yellow card) 59'; Odoffin 69'	Report	Kachunga (yellow card) 4'; Loft 49'; Gibbons (yellow card) 83'	Stadium: New York Stadium; Attendance: 8,162; Referee: Ross Joyce

1 February 2025 30	Birmingham City	2–1	Rotherham United	Bordesley
15:00 GMT	Stansfield 54', 81' (pen.); May (yellow card) 86'; Hanley (yellow card) 90+1'	Report	Odoffin (yellow card) 40'; Nombe 44'; Humphreys (yellow card) 73'; Phillips (yellow card) 80'	Stadium: St Andrew's; Attendance: 34,393; Referee: Farai Hallam

8 February 2025 31	Rotherham United	1–2	Shrewsbury Town	Rotherham
15:00 GMT	Odoffin 76'; Humphreys (yellow card) 89'	Report	Perry 68'; Marquis 77'	Stadium: New York Stadium; Attendance: 8,820; Referee: Dale Baines

11 February 2025 19	Blackpool	0–0	Rotherham United	Blackpool
19:45 GMT	Silvera (yellow card) 11'	Report	Hugill (yellow card) 77'	Stadium: Bloomfield Road; Attendance: 8,216; Referee: Seb Stockbridge
Note: Fixture was originally scheduled for 7 December, but was postponed due to safety concerns from Storm Darragh.

15 February 2025 32	Reading	2–1	Rotherham United	Reading
15:00 GMT	Knibbs 24', 90+4' (pen.), (yellow card) 90+5'	Report	Humphreys (yellow card) 17'; James (yellow card) 35'; Nombe 57' (pen.)	Stadium: Select Car Leasing Stadium; Attendance: 10,034; Referee: Thomas Parsons

22 February 2025 33	Rotherham United	0–1	Barnsley	Rotherham
12:30 GMT	Wilks (yellow card) 90+6'	Report	Phillips 52' (pen.); Connell (yellow card) 72'	Stadium: New York Stadium; Attendance: 10,755; Referee: Oliver Yates
Note: Fixture was initially scheduled for a 15:00 kick-off, but was moved for live Sky Sports broadcasting.

1 March 2025 34	Bristol Rovers	2–3	Rotherham United	Horfield
15:00 GMT	Sotiriou 5'; Martin (yellow card) 48'; Swinkels 72'; Butcher (yellow card) 85'; Thomas (yellow card) 90+1'	Report	Nombe 36', 90+2'; Jules 52'	Stadium: Memorial Stadium; Attendance: 7,799; Referee: Edward Duckworth

4 March 2025 35	Rotherham United	1–0	Leyton Orient	Rotherham
19:45 GMT	Sweeney 60' (o.g.); McWilliams (yellow card) 90+1'	Report	Abdulai (yellow card) 90+1'	Stadium: New York Stadium; Attendance: 8,106; Referee: Lewis Smith

8 March 2025 36	Wrexham	1–0	Rotherham United	Wrexham
15:00 GMT	Smith 48'	Report	Wilks (yellow card) 81'	Stadium: Racecourse Ground; Attendance: 13,245; Referee: Jeremy Simpson

15 March 2025 37	Rotherham United	1–1	Exeter City	Rotherham
15:00 GMT	James 45'	Report	Hartridge 56'; Watts (yellow card) 70'	Stadium: New York Stadium; Attendance: 8,438; Referee: Martin Coy

18 March 2025 26	Rotherham United	2–3	Wycombe Wanderers	Rotherham
19:45 GMT	Sibley 66'; Clarke-Harris 90+5' (pen.)	Report	Bradley (yellow card) 52', (goal) 90'; Low (yellow card) 61'; Kone 69'; Kodua 90+2'	Stadium: New York Stadium; Attendance: 7,798; Referee: Simon Mather
Note: Fixture was originally scheduled for 11 January, but was postponed due to Wycombe's FA Cup progression.

29 March 2025 39	Rotherham United	0–4	Crawley Town	Rotherham
15:00 GMT	Sibley (yellow card) 21'; Wilks (yellow card) 59'; Nombe (yellow card) 88'	Report	Doyle 23', 52'; Ibrahim (yellow card) 59'; Holohan 84'; Camará 87'	Stadium: New York Stadium; Attendance: 8,177; Referee: Leigh Doughty

1 April 2025 40	Northampton Town	0–2	Rotherham United	Sixfields
19:45 BST	Eyoma (yellow card) 40'; Perry (yellow card) 75'	Report	Mpanzu 22'; Powell (yellow card) 53'; Nombe 65'; Hugill (yellow card) 84'	Stadium: Sixfields Stadium; Attendance: 5,720; Referee: Scott Simpson

5 April 2025 41	Rotherham United	2–1	Blackpool	Rotherham
15:00 BST	Odoffin 20'; Wilks (yellow card) 59'; Nombe (yellow card) 71'; Rafferty 90'	Report	Beesley (yellow card) 51'; Carey 82' (pen.); Beesley (red card) 90'	Stadium: New York Stadium; Attendance: 9,172; Referee: Elliot Bell

8 April 2025 38	Bolton Wanderers	0–1	Rotherham United	Horwich
19:45 BST	Baxter (yellow card) 85'	Report	Nombe 11'	Stadium: Toughsheet Community Stadium; Attendance: 19,218; Referee: Ross Joyce
Note: Fixture was initially scheduled for 22 March, but was move due to international call-ups within the Bolton squad.

12 April 2025 42	Stockport County	3–1	Rotherham United	Edgeley
15:00 BST	Diamond 42'; Hills 60'; Wootton 73'	Report	Wilks 9'	Stadium: Edgeley Park; Attendance: 10,390; Referee: Lee Swabey

18 April 2025 43	Rotherham United	3–3	Mansfield Town	Rotherham
15:00 BST	Wilks 17', 66'; Nombe 36'; Douglas (yellow card) 90+7'	Report	Maris 8'; Cargill (yellow card) 24'; Reed (yellow card) 27'; Flint 77'; Bowery 87'; Oshilaja (yellow card) 90+5'	Stadium: New York Stadium; Attendance: 10,665; Referee: David Rock

21 April 2025 44	Wigan Athletic	1–0	Rotherham United	Wigan
15:00 BST	Carragher 36'; Mellish (yellow card) 47'	Report	Sibley (yellow card) 34'	Stadium: Brick Community Stadium; Attendance: 9,391; Referee: Greg Rollason

27 April 2025 45	Stevenage	1–1	Rotherham United	Stevenage
14:00 BST	Piergianni (yellow card) 86'; Sweeney 90+2'	Report	Nombe 8'; Rafferty (yellow card) 30'; Kelly (yellow card) 35'	Stadium: Broadhall Way; Attendance: 4,092; Referee: Andy Davies
Note: Fixture was initially scheduled for 26 April, but was re-arranged due to Stevenage also having a fixture on the preceding Thursday.

=== FA Cup ===
Rotherham United were drawn at home to Cheltenham Town in the first round.

Win Draw Loss Fixtures

2 November 2024 First round	Rotherham United	1–3	Cheltenham Town	Rotherham
15:00 BST	Wilks 37'; Powell (yellow card) 46'; Odoffin (yellow card) 71'	Report	Kinsella (yellow card) 21'; Colwill 36', 45'; Archer 58'; Young (yellow card) 60'	Stadium: New York Stadium; Attendance: 2,770; Referee: Adam Herczeg

=== EFL Cup ===
On 27 June, the draw for the first round was made, with Rotherham being drawn at home against Crewe Alexandra. In the second round, they were drawn away to Fleetwood Town.

Win Draw Loss Fixtures

13 August 2024 First round	Rotherham United	2–1	Crewe Alexandra	Rotherham
19:45 BST	Raggett (yellow card) 1'; Nombe 55'; Odoffin 86'	Report	Holíček 50'; Lunt (yellow card) 54'	Stadium: New York Stadium; Attendance: 2,182; Referee: Scott Oldham

27 August 2024 Second round	Fleetwood Town	2–1	Rotherham United	Fleetwood
19:45 BST	Graydon 16', 29'; Sarpong-Wiredu (yellow card) 50'; Lonergan (yellow card) 56'; Virtue (yellow card) 64'; Bonds (yellow card) 87'	Report	McCart 2'; Odoffin (yellow card) 86'; Clarke-Harris (yellow card) 88'	Stadium: Highbury Stadium; Attendance: 1,744; Referee: Ross Joyce

=== EFL Trophy ===
In the group stage, Rotherham were drawn into Northern Group H alongside Bradford City, Mansfield Town and Newcastle United U21. Rotherham were drawn at home against Tranmere Rovers in the round of 32, away to Chesterfield in the round of 16 and home against Bradford City in the quarter-finals.

==== Group stage ====
Pos	Div	Team	Pld	W	PW	PL	L	GF	GA	GD	Pts	Qualification
1	L1	Rotherham United	3	3	0	0	0	6	1	+5	9	Advance to Round 2
2	L2	Bradford City	3	1	0	1	1	5	3	+2	4	Advance to Round 2
3	L1	Mansfield Town	3	1	0	0	2	3	5	−2	3	
4	ACA	Newcastle United U21	3	0	1	0	2	3	8	−5	2	

Source: EFL

Win Draw Loss Fixtures

20 August 2024 Group stage	Rotherham United	2–0	Mansfield Town	Rotherham
19:00 BST	Hugill 3', 54'; Bramall (yellow card) 52'; MacDonald (red card) 69'; James (yellow card) 73'	Report	McLaughlin (yellow card) 45+1'; Macdonald (yellow card) 90+2'	Stadium: New York Stadium; Attendance: 2,265; Referee: Scott Jackson

8 October 2024 Group stage	Rotherham United	3–1	Newcastle United U21	Rotherham
19:00 GMT	Hugill 20', 45+2', (yellow card) 72'; Holmes (yellow card) 31'; Duncan (yellow card) 41'; Bramall (yellow card) 56'; Hatton (yellow card) 62'; McWilliams (yellow card) 63'; Osong 82'	Report	Thompson (yellow card) 53'; Emerson 59'	Stadium: New York Stadium; Attendance: 1,613; Referee: Ruebyn Ricardo

19 November 2024 Group stage	Bradford City	0–1	Rotherham United	Bradford
19:30 GMT	Diabate (yellow card) 56'; Walker (yellow card) 63'; Smallwood (yellow card) 76'	Report	McWilliams 5'; Kelly (yellow card) 69'	Stadium: Valley Parade; Attendance: 1,640; Referee: Jacob Miles
Note: Fixture was initially scheduled for 12 November, but was pushed back a week.

==== Knoutout stages ====
10 December 2024 Round of 32	Rotherham United	3–2	Tranmere Rovers	Rotherham
19:00 GMT	Clarke-Harris 24' (pen.); Jules 48'; Nombe (yellow card) 82'; Odoffin 90'	Report	Jennings (yellow card) 47'; Bradshaw (red card) 54'; Dennis 85'; Patrick 90+8'	Stadium: New York Stadium; Attendance: 1,093; Referee: Scott Tallis

14 January 2025 Round of 16	Chesterfield	0–0 (3–4 p)	Rotherham United	Chesterfield
19:00 GMT	Dobra (yellow card) 90+1'	Report	Kelly (yellow card) 52'; Odoffin (yellow card) 57'; Jules (yellow card) 69'; Nombe (yellow card) 90+3'	Stadium: SMH Group Stadium; Attendance: 3,517; Referee: Scott Oldham
	Penalties
	Banks (penalty scored); Dobra (penalty scored); Drummond (penalty missed); Cook (penalty scored); Oldaker (penalty missed)		Clarke-Harris (penalty scored); Nombe (penalty scored); Odoffin (penalty scored); Powell (penalty missed); Humphreys (penalty scored)

4 February 2025 Quarter-Finals	Rotherham United	0–1	Bradford City	Rotherham
19:30 GMT	Raggett (yellow card) 90+1'	Report	Smallwood 58' (pen.); Byrne (yellow card) 90+1'; Walker (yellow card) 90+6'	Stadium: New York Stadium; Attendance: 3,073; Referee: Adam Herczeg

== Statistics ==
=== Appearances and goals ===
As of match played 27 April 2025

Players with no appearances are not included on the list
Italics indicate a loaned in player

No.	Pos	Nat	Player	Total		League One		FA Cup		EFL Cup		EFL Trophy	
No.	Pos	Nat	Player	Apps	Goals	Apps	Goals	Apps	Goals	Apps	Goals	Apps	Goals
1	GK	(England) ENG	Cameron Dawson	22	0	14+1	0	1+0	0	2+0	0	4+0	0
2	DF	(Republic of Ireland) IRL	Joe Rafferty	43	1	37+1	1	1+0	0	0+0	0	4+0	0
4	MF	(Scotland) SCO	Liam Kelly	22	1	14+3	1	0+1	0	1+1	0	2+0	0
5	DF	(England) ENG	Sean Raggett	11	1	6+3	1	0+0	0	1+0	0	1+0	0
6	DF	(England) ENG	Reece James	50	2	42+1	2	0+0	0	1+1	0	5+0	0
7	MF	(England) ENG	Joe Powell	54	1	43+2	1	1+0	0	2+0	0	3+3	0
8	FW	(England) ENG	Sam Nombe	49	14	39+3	13	0+1	0	1+1	1	0+4	0
9	FW	(Jamaica) JAM	Jonson Clarke-Harris	33	8	19+10	7	0+0	0	2+0	0	2+0	1
10	FW	(England) ENG	Jordan Hugill	35	5	7+21	1	1+0	0	0+0	0	5+1	4
11	FW	(England) ENG	Andre Green	16	3	8+5	3	0+0	0	0+0	0	3+0	0
12	FW	(England) ENG	Mallik Wilks	44	10	38+2	9	1+0	1	1+0	0	2+0	0
14	MF	(Scotland) SCO	Alex MacDonald	19	1	8+7	1	0+1	0	2+0	0	1+0	0
15	MF	(England) ENG	Louie Sibley	21	2	15+5	2	0+0	0	0+0	0	1+0	0
16	DF	(Scotland) SCO	Zak Jules	29	3	22+0	2	1+0	0	0+0	0	6+0	1
17	MF	(England) ENG	Shaun McWilliams	30	1	12+11	0	0+0	0	1+1	0	4+1	1
18	MF	(England) ENG	Dan Gore	2	0	0+2	0	0+0	0	0+0	0	0+0	0
20	GK	(England) ENG	Dillon Phillips	34	0	31+1	0	0+0	0	0+0	0	2+0	0
22	MF	(England) ENG	Hakeem Odoffin	51	7	43+0	5	1+0	0	1+1	1	4+1	1
23	MF	(England) ENG	Jack Holmes	35	0	3+24	0	1+0	0	1+0	0	3+3	0
24	DF	(England) ENG	Cameron Humphreys	45	1	38+1	1	1+0	0	1+0	0	3+1	0
25	MF	(Democratic Republic of the Congo) COD	Pelly Ruddock Mpanzu	17	1	17+0	1	0+0	0	0+0	0	0+0	0
28	FW	(Republic of Ireland) IRL	Joshua Kayode	11	0	1+10	0	0+0	0	0+0	0	0+0	0
32	DF	(England) ENG	Hamish Douglas	2	0	0+2	0	0+0	0	0+0	0	0+0	0
34	FW	(Northern Ireland) NIR	Ciaran McGuckin	3	0	1+2	0	0+0	0	0+0	0	0+0	0
35	FW	(England) ENG	Ben Hatton	5	0	0+0	0	0+1	0	0+0	0	2+2	0
37	DF	(England) ENG	Jake Hull	2	0	0+0	0	0+0	0	0+0	0	0+2	0
38	MF	(England) ENG	Kane Richardson	1	0	0+0	0	0+0	0	0+0	0	0+1	0
39	DF	(England) ENG	Harrison Duncan	1	0	0+0	0	0+0	0	0+0	0	1+0	0
41	FW	(England) ENG	Josh Ayres	1	0	0+0	0	0+0	0	0+0	0	0+1	0
Player(s) who featured whilst on loan but returned to parent club during the season:
19	FW	(England) ENG	Esapa Osong	10	1	1+5	0	0+0	0	0+2	0	2+0	1
21	FW	(England) ENG	Joseph Hungbo	18	0	5+8	0	0+1	0	1+0	0	2+1	0
Player(s) who featured but departed the club permanently during the season:
3	DF	(England) ENG	Cohen Bramall	20	0	5+10	0	1+0	0	1+0	0	3+0	0
27	MF	(Ivory Coast) CIV	Christ Tiéhi	20	0	13+3	0	1+0	0	1+0	0	1+1	0
30	DF	(Scotland) SCO	Jamie McCart	20	1	13+3	0	0+0	0	2+0	1	0+2	0
