= Ben Hatton =

English footballer (born 2005)

Personal information
- Full name: Benjamin George Hatton
- Date of birth: 1 November 2005 (age 21)
- Position: Midfielder

Team information
- Current team: Worksop Town

Youth career
- Rotherham United

Senior career*
Years	Team	Apps	(Gls)
2024–	Rotherham United	3	(0)
2025	→ Warrington Town (loan)	2	(0)
2026	→ North Ferriby (loan)	1	(0)
- → Worksop Town (loan)
- * Club domestic league appearances and goals as of 18:25, 8 February 2026 (UTC)

Benjamin George Hatton (born 1 November 2005) is an English Professional footballer who plays as a midfielder for National League North side Worksop Town.

== Career ==
Hatton progressed through the Rotherham United academy, receiving his first professional contract in January 2024. In April 2024, first-team manager Leam Richardson confirmed that he would be joining the first-team picture permanently as a rookie having been training with the squad for a number of weeks. . On 10 April 2024, Hatton made his senior debut for the already relegated Millers, replacing Andy Rinomhota in the final minute of a 2–0 defeat to West Bromwich Albion.

On 13 March 2025, Hatton joined National League North side Warrington Town on loan for the remainder of the season. Following the conclusion of the 2024–25 season, Rotherham announced that they had exercised a one-year contract extension for Hatton.

Shortly after recovering from a hamstring injury picked up during his loan spell with Warrington Town, he suffered a torn hamstring in July 2025, expected to rule him out for a period in excess of three months. In February 2026, he joined Northern Premier League Division One East club North Ferriby on a one-month youth loan.

On 8 May 2026 Rotherham announced he was being released after the team's relegation to EFL League Two.

on 23rd July 2026, Hatton was unveiled by Worksop following a successful trial period

== Career statistics ==
As of match played 13 January 2026

Appearances and goals by club, season and competition
Club	Season	League			FA Cup		League Cup		Other		Total	
Club	Season	Division	Apps	Goals	Apps	Goals	Apps	Goals	Apps	Goals	Apps	Goals
Rotherham United	2023–24	Championship	3	0	0	0	0	0	—		3	0
Rotherham United	2024–25	League One	0	0	1	0	0	0	4 (Note: Appearance(s) in EFL Trophy)	0	5	0
Rotherham United	2025–26	League One	0	0	0	0	0	0	1	0	1	0
Rotherham United	Total		3	0	1	0	0	0	5	0	9	0
Warrington Town (loan)	2024–25	National League North	2	0	—		—		0	0	2	0
Career total			5	0	1	0	0	0	5	0	11	0
