= Jack Holmes (footballer) =

English footballer (born 2001)

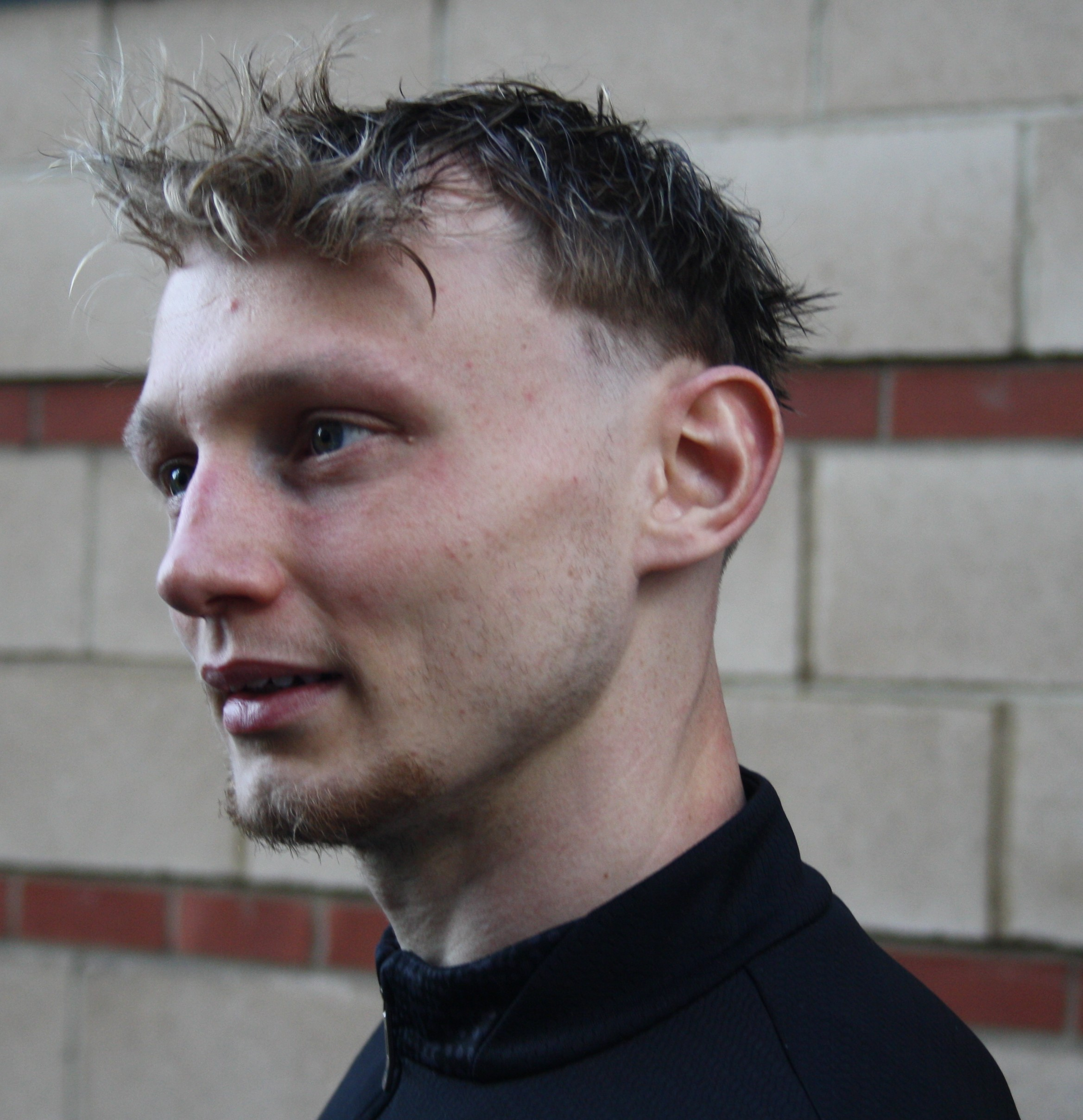
- Holmes in 2026

Personal information
- Full name: Jack Harry Holmes
- Date of birth: 19 September 2001 (age 25)
- Position: Midfielder

Team information
- Current team: Boston United
- Number: 23

Youth career
- Burton Albion

Senior career*
Years	Team	Apps	(Gls)
2019–2020	Burton Albion	0	(0)
2020	→ Halesowen Town (loan)	9	(1)
2020–2024	Halesowen Town	82	(9)
2022–2023	→ Hereford (dual reg.)	28	(2)
2024	Stamford	0	(0)
2024–2026	Rotherham United	40	(2)
2026–	Boston United	0	(0)
- * Club domestic league appearances and goals as of 06:59, 1 July 2026 (UTC)

Jack Harry Holmes (born 19 September 2001) is an English professional footballer who plays as a midfielder for National League club Boston United.

== Career ==
Holmes began his career at Burton Albion, joining Halesowen Town initially on loan in January 2020, before signing permanently in September 2020. He spent the 2022–23 season on dual registration with Hereford, leaving the club in April 2023 after saying he did not have the mentality to be in a relegation fight.

He signed for Stamford in July 2024, but later that month he moved to Rotherham United after featuring against them for Stamford in a pre-season friendly. After two seasons, he left the club after failing to agree a new contract at the end of the 2025–26 season. He joined National League club Boston United on a one-year deal with an option for a further year on 1 July 2026.

== Career statistics ==
As of end of 2025–26 season

Appearances and goals by club, season and competition
Club	Season	League			FA Cup		EFL Cup		Other		Total	
Club	Season	Division	Apps	Goals	Apps	Goals	Apps	Goals	Apps	Goals	Apps	Goals
Burton Albion	2019–20	League One	0	0	0	0	0	0	0	0	0	0
Halesowen Town (loan)	2019–20	SL Division One Central	9	1	—		—		2 (Note: Appearance(s) in FA Trophy)	0	11	1
Halesowen Town	2020–21	SL Division One Central	6	1	4	2	—		1	0	11	3
Halesowen Town	2021–22	NPL Division One Midlands	31	4	3	0	—		4 (Note: Two appearances in Birmingham Senior Cup; one appearance in FA Trophy; one appearance in Northern Premier League Division One Midlands play-offs)	0	38	4
Halesowen Town	2022–23	NPL Division One Midlands	10	2	1	0	—		3 (Note: One appearance in FA Trophy; two appearances in Northern Premier League Division One Midlands play-offs)	0	14	2
Halesowen Town	2023–24	SL Premier Division Central	35	2	3	2	—		3 (Note: Two appearances in FA Trophy; one appearance in Birmingham Senior Cup)	0	41	4
Halesowen Town	Total		82	9	11	4	0	0	11	0	104	13
Hereford (dual reg.)	2022–23	National League North	28	2	0	0	—		0	0	28	2
Rotherham United	2024–25	League One	28	0	1	0	1	0	6 (Note: Appearances in EFL Trophy)	0	36	0
Rotherham United	2025–26	League One	12	2	1	0	2	0	5	0	20	2
Rotherham United	Total		40	2	2	0	3	0	11	0	56	2
Career total			159	14	13	4	3	0	24	0	199	18
