= Sam Nombe =

English footballer (born 1998)

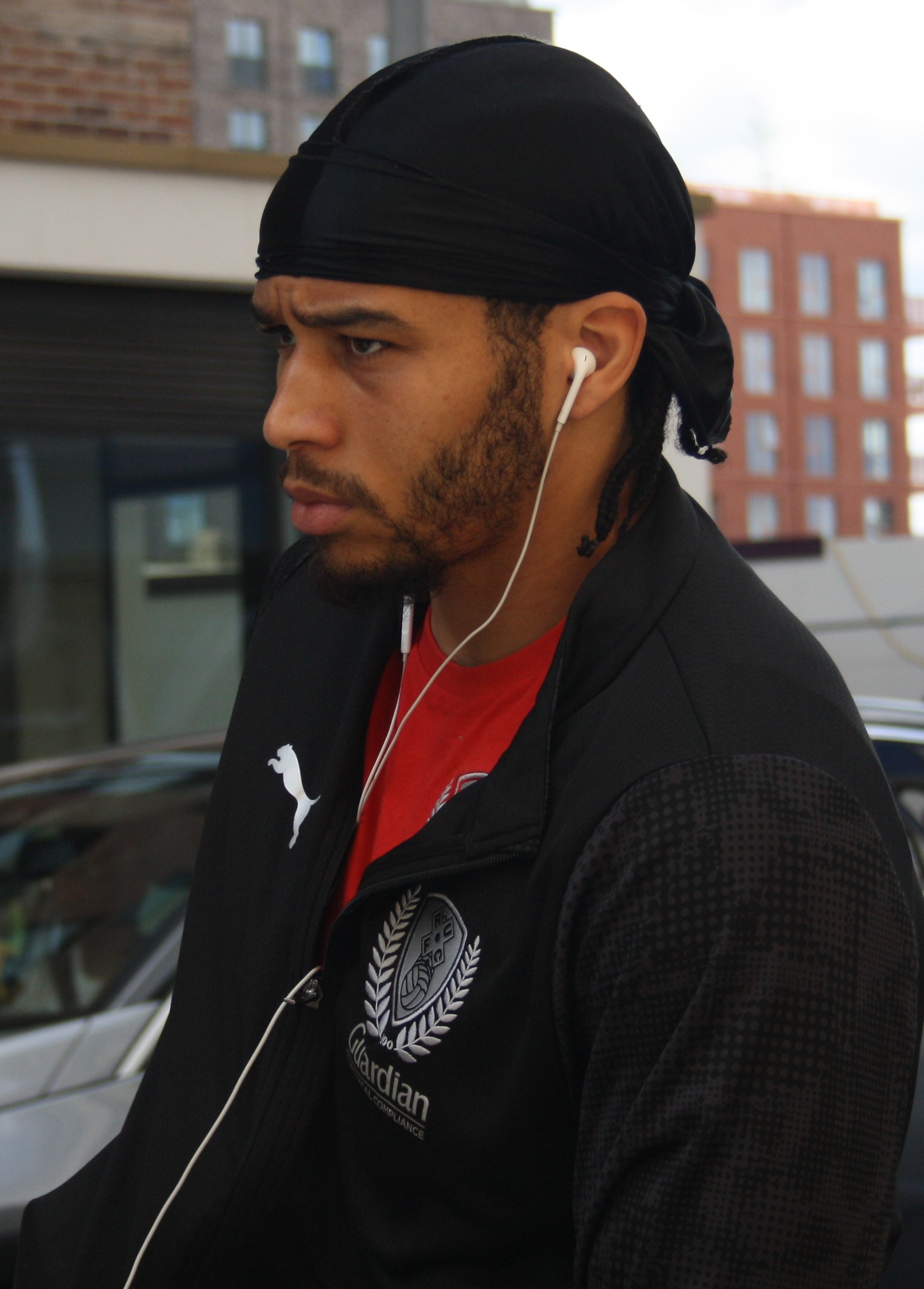
- Nombe in 2026

Personal information
- Full name: Samuel Tshiayima Nombe
- Date of birth: 22 October 1998 (age 28)
- Place of birth: Croydon, England
- Height: 5 ft 11 in (1.80 m)
- Position: Forward

Team information
- Current team: Milton Keynes Dons
- Number: 9

Youth career
- –2017: Milton Keynes Dons

Senior career*
Years	Team	Apps	(Gls)
2017–2021	Milton Keynes Dons	31	(2)
2018	→ Oxford City (loan)	9	(6)
2018–2019	→ Oxford City (loan)	11	(2)
2019	→ Maidenhead United (loan)	14	(1)
2020–2021	→ Luton Town (loan)	11	(0)
2021–2023	Exeter City	76	(23)
2023–2026	Rotherham United	115	(29)
2026–	Milton Keynes Dons	11	(1)
- * Club domestic league appearances and goals as of 16:55, 24 October 2026 (UTC)

Samuel Tshiayima Nombe (born 22 October 1998) is an English professional footballer who plays as a forward for EFL League One club Milton Keynes Dons.

== Club career ==
=== Milton Keynes Dons ===
Nombe joined Milton Keynes Dons academy at under-11 level, and on 12 May 2017 signed professional terms with the club, alongside fellow academy graduate Hugo Logan.

On 8 August 2017, Nombe made his competitive professional debut for the club, coming on as an 80th-minute substitute for Ryan Seager during an EFL Cup first round away win over Forest Green Rovers. Nombe made his league debut four days later on 12 August 2017, coming on as a 72nd-minute substitute for Robbie Muirhead in a 1–0 away defeat to Blackpool.

On 18 May 2018, following a productive first season as a professional, Nombe signed a contract extension keeping him at the club until summer 2019, which was later extended until June 2020 on 31 May 2018.

==== Oxford City (loans) ====
On 9 February 2018, Nombe joined National League South club Oxford City on loan until the end of the 2017–18 season. During his brief loan spell, Nombe scored six goals in nine appearances for the club before being recalled to Milton Keynes Dons on 23 April 2018.

On 30 October 2018 Nombe re-joined Oxford City on a short-term loan until 1 January 2019.

==== Maidenhead United (loan) ====
On 11 January 2019, Nombe joined National League club Maidenhead United on loan until the end of the season.

==== Luton Town (loan) ====
On 16 October 2020, Nombe joined Championship club Luton Town for the remainder of the 2020–21 season with an "intent and option" for a permanent transfer. At the conclusion of the season, Luton Town opted not to make Nombe's transfer permanent following limited first team opportunities in which he made only 11 league appearances.

=== Exeter City ===
On 5 July 2021, Nombe joined League Two club Exeter City for an undisclosed fee, signing a three-year contract. He scored his first goal for City on 18 September in a 2–0 home win over Sutton United, his effort minutes prior being chalked down as a Sutton own goal. Exeter secured promotion back to League One that season, with Nombe scoring eight goals despite being injured for a large part of the season.

=== Rotherham United ===
On 31 August 2023, Nombe departed Exeter after weeks of speculation, reuniting with former manager Matt Taylor, joining Championship club Rotherham United for a club-record undisclosed fee on a four-year deal.

=== Milton Keynes Dons (second spell) ===
On 24 July 2026, Nombe rejoined newly-promoted League One club Milton Keynes Dons, signing for a fee in the region of £600,000 plus add-ons. He made his second debut for the club on 8 August 2026 in a 4–1 EFL Cup first round defeat away to Norwich City.

== Career statistics ==
As of 24 October 2026

Club	Season	League			FA Cup		League Cup		Other		Total	
Club	Season	Division	Apps	Goals	Apps	Goals	Apps	Goals	Apps	Goals	Apps	Goals
Milton Keynes Dons	2017–18	League One	6	0	1	0	2	0	3 (Note: Appearance(s) in EFL Trophy)	0	12	0
Milton Keynes Dons	2018–19	League Two	0	0	0	0	1	0	1	0	2	0
Milton Keynes Dons	2019–20	League One	21	2	0	0	2	1	2	2	25	5
Milton Keynes Dons	2020–21	League One	4	0	0	0	1	0	2	1	7	1
Milton Keynes Dons	Total		31	2	1	0	6	1	8	3	46	6
Oxford City (loan)	2017–18	National League South	9	6	—		—		—		9	6
Oxford City (loan)	2018–19	National League South	11	2	2	0	—		1 (Note: Appearance(s) in FA Trophy)	1	14	3
Oxford City (loan)	Total		20	8	2	0	—		1	1	23	9
Maidenhead United (loan)	2018–19	National League	14	1	—		—		0	0	14	1
Luton Town (loan)	2020–21	Championship	11	0	1	0	0	0	0	0	12	0
Exeter City	2021–22	League Two	28	8	3	2	0	0	1	0	32	10
Exeter City	2022–23	League One	43	15	2	0	2	2	0	0	47	17
Exeter City	2023–24	League One	5	0	0	0	1	0	0	0	6	0
Exeter City	Total		76	23	5	2	3	2	1	0	85	27
Rotherham United	2023–24	Championship	41	3	1	0	—		0	0	42	3
Rotherham United	2024–25	League One	43	14	1	0	2	1	2	0	48	15
Rotherham United	2025–26	League One	31	12	1	1	0	0	0	0	32	13
Rotherham United	Total		115	29	3	1	2	1	2	0	122	31
Milton Keynes Dons	2026–27	League One	11	1	0	0	1	0	1	1	13	2
Career total			278	64	12	3	12	4	13	5	315	76

== Honours ==
Exeter City

- EFL League Two second-place promotion: 2021–22

Individual

- Milton Keynes Dons Young Player of the Year: 2019–20
