= Christ Tiéhi =

Ivorian footballer (born 1998)

Personal information
- Full name: Christ Joël Junior Tiéhi
- Date of birth: 16 June 1998 (age 28)
- Place of birth: Paris, France
- Height: 1.84 m (6 ft 0 in)
- Position: Defensive midfielder

Team information
- Current team: Maccabi Bnei Reineh
- Number: 27

Youth career
- 2009–2018: Le Havre

Senior career*
Years	Team	Apps	(Gls)
2015–2019	Le Havre II	51	(3)
2016–2019	Le Havre	0	(0)
2016	→ AD Oeiras (loan)	4	(0)
2019–2020	Woking	1	(0)
2019–2020	→ Tonbridge Angels (dual-reg.)	10	(1)
2020	Tonbridge Angels	8	(0)
2020–2021	Opava	25	(1)
2021–2023	Slovan Liberec	22	(0)
2022	→ Slavia Prague (loan)	13	(1)
2022	→ Slavia Prague B (loan)	1	(0)
2022	→ Wigan Athletic (loan)	19	(0)
2023–2025	Rotherham United	51	(2)
2025–2026	Diósgyőr	12	(0)
2025–2026	→ Baník Ostrava (loan)	5	(0)
2026–	Maccabi Bnei Reineh	11	(0)

International career
2017	Ivory Coast U20	5	(1)
- * Club domestic league appearances and goals as of 24 June 2026

Christ Joël Junior Tiéhi (born 16 June 1998) is a professional footballer who plays as a defensive midfielder for Israeli Premier League club Maccabi Bnei Reineh.

== Club career ==
A youth product of Le Havre since 2009, Tiéhi signed his first professional contract on 17 May 2018. He made his senior debut for Le Havre in a 2–0 Coupe de la Ligue win over Football Bourg-en-Bresse Péronnas 01 on 14 August 2018. During his time at Le Havre, Tiéhi also had a brief loan spell at Portuguese side, AD Oeiras in 2016.

On 23 September 2019, it was confirmed that Tiéhi had moved to Woking. On 12 October 2019, Tiéhi joined National League South side, Tonbridge Angels on a dual-registration basis, making his debut in a 5–1 victory over Braintree Town on the same day. On 6 February 2020, it was announced that Christ would be signing for Tonbridge for the remainder of the season. On 21 September 2020, despite extending his stay for the 2020–21 campaign, Tiéhi opted to return to France for personal reasons.

On 21 November 2020, Tiéhi signed for Czech First League side, Opava for the remainder of the campaign and went onto make his debut, starting in a 6–0 home defeat to Slavia Prague. On 11 August 2021, Tiéhi scored his first goal for the club, netting in Opava's 9–0 home victory over Bohumín in the Czech Cup. He went onto score once more, featuring 26 times in total for the club before leaving in September 2021.

On 7 September 2021, Tiéhi was rewarded with a move back to the Czech First League, following Opava's relegation, to join Slovan Liberec and made his debut during a 2–2 draw with Pardubice four days later.

In July 2022, Tiehi joined Slavia Prague on a half-season loan. On 13 January 2023, Tiéhi was loaned to Wigan until the end of the season.

In August 2023, Tiehi joined Rotherham United for a club-record fee, signing a three-year deal with the EFL Championship club.

On 11 January 2025, Tiéhi joined Nemzeti Bajnokság I club Diósgyőr for an undisclosed fee on a two-and-a-half year deal.

On 30 June 2025, Tiéhi joined Czech club Baník Ostrava on a loan deal with option to buy.

== International career ==
Tiéhi represented the Ivory Coast U20s at the 2017 Toulon Tournament.

== Personal life ==
Born in France, Tiéhi is the son of the Ivorian former international footballer Joël Tiéhi. His younger brother is Jean-Pierre Tiéhi.

== Career statistics ==
As of 11 January 2025

Appearances and goals by club, season and competition
Club	Season	League			National cup		League cup		Other		Total	
Club	Season	Division	Apps	Goals	Apps	Goals	Apps	Goals	Apps	Goals	Apps	Goals
Le Havre II	2015–16	CFA 3	4	0	—		—		—		4	0
Le Havre II	2016–17	CFA 2	3	0	—		—		—		3	0
Le Havre II	2017–18	CFA 2	21	0	—		—		—		21	0
Le Havre II	2018–19	CFA 2	23	3	—		—		—		23	3
Le Havre II	Total		51	3	—		—		—		51	3
Le Havre	2016–17	Ligue 2	0	0	0	0	0	0	—		0	0
Le Havre	2017–18	Ligue 2	0	0	0	0	0	0	—		0	0
Le Havre	2018–19	Ligue 2	0	0	0	0	2	0	—		2	0
Le Havre	Total		0	0	0	0	2	0	—		2	0
AD Oeiras (loan)	2016–17	Lisbon First Division	4	0	—		—		—		4	0
Woking	2019–20	National League	1	0	0	0	—		0	0	1	0
Tonbridge Angels (dual-reg.)	2019–20	National League South	10	1	0	0	—		2 (Note: Appearances in the FA Trophy)	0	12	1
Tonbridge Angels	2019–20	National League South	8	0	—		—		—		8	0
Opava	2020–21	Czech First League	19	0	0	0	—		—		19	0
Opava	2021–22	Czech National Football League	6	1	1	1	—		—		7	2
Opava	Total		25	1	1	1	—		—		26	2
Slovan Liberec	2021–22	Czech First League	22	0	0	0	—		—		22	0
Slovan Liberec	2022–23	Czech First League	0	0	0	0	—		—		0	0
Slovan Liberec	Total		22	0	0	0	—		—		22	0
Slavia Prague (loan)	2022–23	Czech First League	13	1	1	0	—		12 (Note: Appearances in the UEFA Europa Conference League)	1	26	2
Slavia Prague B (loan)	2022–23	Czech National Football League	1	0	—		—		—		1	0
Wigan Athletic (loan)	2022–23	EFL Championship	19	0	0	0	0	0	—		19	0
Rotherham United	2023–24	EFL Championship	35	2	1	0	1	0	—		37	2
Rotherham United	2024–25	League One	16	0	1	0	1	0	2 (Note: Appearance(s) in EFL Trophy)	0	20	0
Rotherham United	Total		51	2	2	0	2	0	2	0	59	2
Career total			205	8	4	1	4	0	16	1	229	9
