= Cafú (footballer, born 1993) =

Portuguese footballer

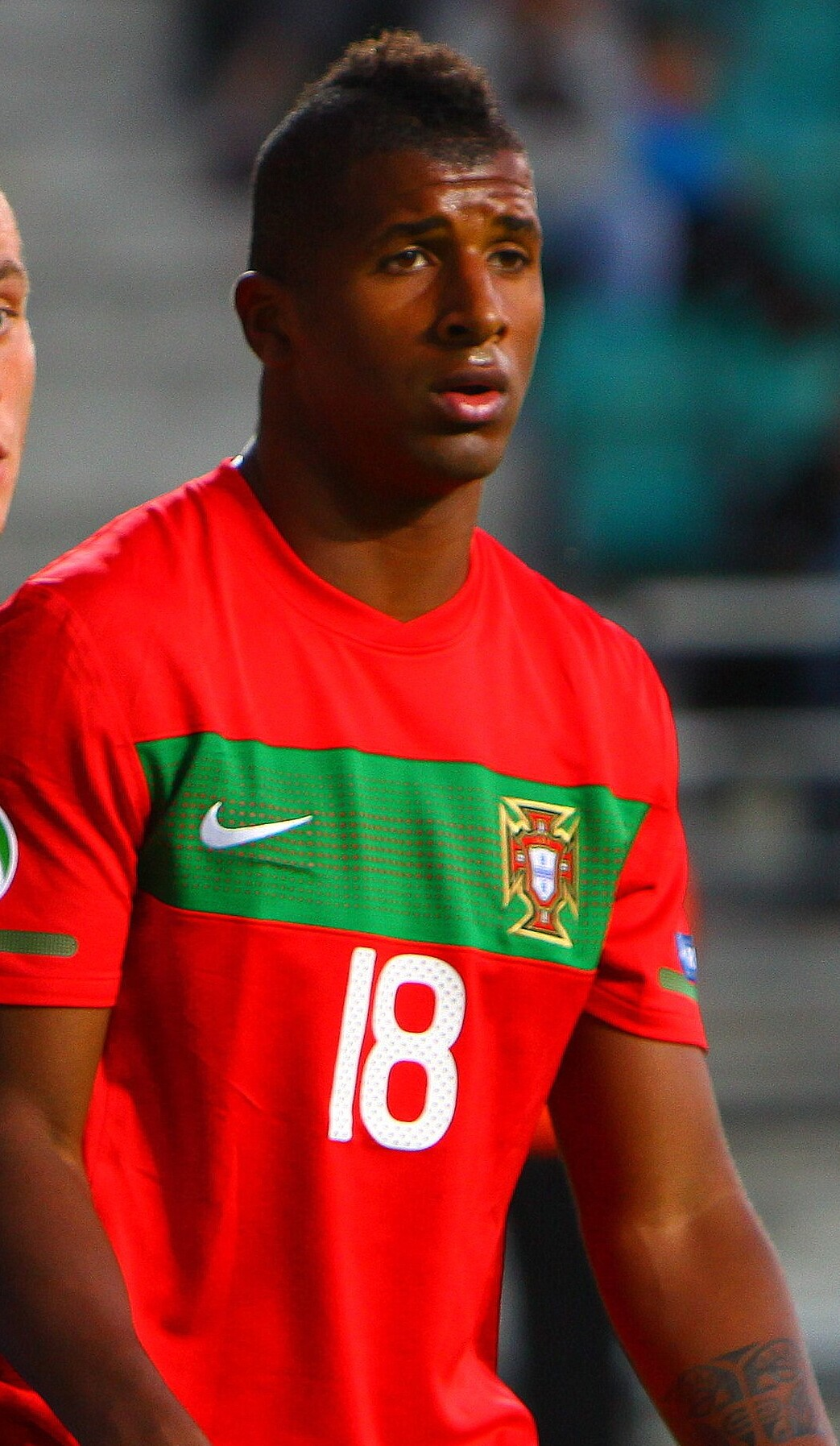
- Cafú playing for Portugal U19

Personal information
- Full name: Carlos Miguel Ribeiro Dias
- Date of birth: 26 February 1993 (age 33)
- Place of birth: Guimarães, Portugal
- Height: 1.85 m (6 ft 1 in)
- Position: Midfielder

Team information
- Current team: AEL Limassol
- Number: 88

Youth career
- 2002–2003: Futsal
- 2003–2004: Caçadores Taipas
- 2004–2008: Vitória Guimarães
- 2008–2012: Benfica

Senior career*
Years	Team	Apps	(Gls)
2012–2013	Benfica B	23	(1)
2013–2014	Vitória Guimarães B	28	(6)
2014–2016	Vitória Guimarães	61	(3)
2016–2017	Lorient	18	(0)
2017–2019	Metz	10	(0)
2018–2019	→ Legia Warsaw (loan)	38	(6)
2019–2020	Legia Warsaw	6	(0)
2019	Legia Warsaw II	1	(0)
2020–2021	Olympiacos	9	(2)
2020–2021	→ Nottingham Forest (loan)	13	(0)
2021–2023	Nottingham Forest	33	(1)
2023–2024	Rotherham United	32	(2)
2024–2026	Kasımpaşa	59	(1)
2026–	AEL Limassol	2	(0)

International career
2008	Portugal U16	4	(0)
2010	Portugal U17	1	(0)
2011	Portugal U18	3	(0)
2011–2012	Portugal U19	13	(5)
2013	Portugal U20	6	(0)
- * Club domestic league appearances and goals as of 6 September 2026

Carlos Miguel Ribeiro Dias (born 26 February 1993), known as Cafú, is a Portuguese professional footballer who plays as a midfielder for Cypriot First Division club AEL Limassol.

He played in Portugal, France, Poland, Greece, England and Turkey, winning two Ekstraklasa and Super League Greece titles with Legia Warsaw and Olympiacos respectively, as well as a double with both of those teams.

Cafú represented Portugal at youth level.

== Club career ==
=== Benfica ===
Born in Guimarães of Bissau-Guinean descent, Cafú joined local Vitória's youth system at the age of 11, signing with Benfica four years later and going on to complete his development there. He started playing as a striker, but later shifted to a defensive midfielder role.

On 19 September 2012, whilst with Benfica B, Cafú made his debut as a professional, coming on as a 46th-minute substitute for Cláudio Correa and scoring the 2–2 equaliser away against Tondela in the Segunda Liga. It was his only goal of the season, in seven starts.

=== Vitória Guimarães ===
On 26 July 2013, Cafú signed a four-year contract with former club Vitória. Having returned to his previous position, he was initially assigned to the reserve team, which he helped to promote to the second tier.

Cafú first appeared in the Primeira Liga on 17 August 2014, in a 3–1 away win over Gil Vicente where he partnered with André André and Bernard Mensah in midfield and also featured the full 90 minutes. He finished his debut campaign with 29 games, in an eventual fifth-place finish and the subsequent qualification for the UEFA Europa League.

=== Lorient ===
On 8 June 2016, Cafú signed a four-year contract with French club Lorient. His maiden appearance in Ligue 1 occurred on 18 November, in a 3–0 home loss against Monaco.

=== Metz ===
Following his team's relegation, Cafú joined Metz also in the French top division on 1 August 2017, penning a three-year deal for an undisclosed fee. He made his league debut 17 days later, playing the full 90 minutes in a 1–0 home defeat to title holders Monaco.

=== Legia Warsaw ===
On 27 February 2018, Cafú was loaned to Legia Warsaw until 30 June 2019. Subsequently, the move was made permanent.

During his spell at the Polish Army Stadium, Cafú took part in 59 competitive matches (nine goals, six assists). On 2 May 2018, he scored the 2–1 winner in the final of the Polish Cup against Arka Gdynia.

=== Olympiacos ===
On 1 February 2020, Olympiacos agreed to pay Legia €400,000 to sign Cafú. He played 14 official games during his stint, including nine in two separate editions of the Super League Greece which his side won.

=== Nottingham Forest ===
Cafú was loaned to English Championship side Nottingham Forest on 5 October 2020, until the end of the season. He was originally seen as a defensive midfielder, but manager Chris Hughton began using him in a more attacking role.

Cafú agreed to a permanent move on 2 February 2021. He scored his first goal for the club on 11 December, closing a 4–1 away win against Swansea City. The following 9 January, he came off the bench for Philip Zinckernagel to help beat Arsenal 1–0 in the third round of the FA Cup. He was unused as the Reds ended their 23-year absence from the Premier League with a 1–0 playoff final victory over Huddersfield Town on 29 May 2022.

On 14 August 2022, Cafú made his debut in the English top tier, replacing Orel Mangala late into the 1–0 home defeat of West Ham United. He was released at the end of the campaign.

=== Rotherham United ===
Cafú returned to the English second division on 8 July 2023, on a one-year deal at Rotherham United. He received two yellow cards in his first competitive game for his new team, resulting in being sent off in the 69th minute of an eventual 4–1 away loss to Stoke City. He scored his first goal the following 20 January, opening the 1–1 draw at Middlesbrough.

On 7 May 2024, after being relegated, Rotherham announced that Cafú was to be released alongside ten teammates when his contract expired on 30 June.

=== Later career ===
On 15 August 2024, Cafú signed for Turkish Süper Lig club Kasımpaşa.

== International career ==
Cafú earned 27 caps for Portugal from under-16 to under-20 levels. He was part of the under-19 squad that competed in the 2012 UEFA European Championship.

== Career statistics ==
As of match played 17 May 2026

Appearances and goals by club, season and competition
Club	Season	League			National cup (Note: Includes Taça de Portugal, Coupe de France, Polish Cup, Greek Cup, FA Cup)		League cup (Note: Includes Taça da Liga, Coupe de la Ligue, EFL Cup)		Continental		Other		Total	
Club	Season	Division	Apps	Goals	Apps	Goals	Apps	Goals	Apps	Goals	Apps	Goals	Apps	Goals
Benfica B	2012–13	Segunda Liga	23	1	—		—		—		—		23	1
Vitória Guimarães B	2013–14	Campeonato Portugal	27	6	—		—		—		—		27	6
Vitória Guimarães B	2014–15	Segunda Liga	1	0	—		—		—		—		1	0
Vitória Guimarães B	Total		28	6	0	0	0	0	0	0	0	0	28	6
Vitória Guimarães	2014–15	Primeira Liga	29	0	1	0	2	0	—		—		32	0
Vitória Guimarães	2015–16	Primeira Liga	32	3	1	0	1	0	2 (Note: Appearance(s) in UEFA Europa League)	0	—		36	3
Vitória Guimarães	Total		61	3	2	0	3	0	2	0	0	0	68	3
Lorient	2016–17	Ligue 1	18	0	2	2	1	0	—		2	0	23	2
Metz	2017–18	Ligue 1	10	0	2	1	1	0	—		—		13	1
Legia Warsaw (loan)	2017–18	Ekstraklasa	7	2	1	1	—		—		—		8	3
Legia Warsaw (loan)	2018–19	Ekstraklasa	31	4	4	2	—		6 (Note: Four appearances in UEFA Champions League, two appearances in UEFA Europa League)	0	1 (Note: Appearance in Polish Super Cup)	0	42	6
Legia Warsaw	2019–20	Ekstraklasa	6	0	0	0	—		3	0	—		9	0
Legia Warsaw	Total		44	6	5	3	0	0	9	0	1	0	59	9
Legia Warsaw II	2019–20	III liga	1	0	0	0	—		—		—		1	0
Olympiacos	2019–20	Super League Greece	7	1	3	0	—		1	0	—		11	1
Olympiacos	2020–21	Super League Greece	2	1	0	0	—		1 (Note: Appearance in UEFA Champions League)	0	—		3	1
Olympiacos	Total		9	1	3	0	—		2	0	—		14	2
Nottingham Forest (loan)	2020–21	Championship	13	0	2	0	0	0	—		—		15	0
Nottingham Forest	2020–21	Championship	18	0	0	0	0	0	—		—		18	0
Nottingham Forest	2021–22	Championship	14	1	3	0	2	0	—		1 (Note: Appearance in EFL Championship play-offs)	0	20	1
Nottingham Forest	2022–23	Premier League	1	0	0	0	1	0	—		—		2	0
Nottingham Forest	Total		46	1	5	0	3	0	—		1	0	55	1
Rotherham United	2023–24	Championship	32	2	1	0	1	0	—		—		34	2
Kasımpaşa	2024–25	Süper Lig	34	1	0	0	—		—		—		34	1
Kasımpaşa	2025–26	Süper Lig	25	0	0	0	—		—		—		25	0
Kasımpaşa	Total		59	1	0	0	—		—		—		59	1
Career total			331	22	20	6	9	0	13	0	4	0	377	28

== Honours ==
Legia Warsaw

- Ekstraklasa: 2017–18, 2019–20
- Polish Cup: 2017–18

Olympiacos

- Super League Greece: 2019–20, 2020–21
- Greek Football Cup: 2019–20

Nottingham Forest

- EFL Championship play-offs: 2022
