= 2023–24 Rotherham United F.C. season =

99th season in existence of Rotherham United FC

Rotherham United
2023–24 season
- Chairman: Tony Stewart
- Manager: Matt Taylor (until 13 November); Wayne Carlisle (interim, from 13 November to 11 December); Leam Richardson (from 11 December to 17 April); Steve Evans (from 17 April)
- Stadium: New York Stadium
- Championship: 24th (relegated)
- FA Cup: Third round
- EFL Cup: Second round
- Top goalscorer: League: Tom Eaves (6); All: Tom Eaves (6)
- Highest home attendance: 11,471 vs Leeds United, 24 November 2023, Championship
- Lowest home attendance: 2,834 vs Morecambe, 8 August 2023, EFL Cup
| Home colours | Away colours | Third colours |

The 2023–24 season was the 99th season in the history of Rotherham United, and their second consecutive season in the Championship. The club participated in the Championship, the FA Cup, and the EFL Cup.

The club were relegated from the Championship following a 1–0 loss to Plymouth Argyle at home on 5 April 2024.

== Current squad ==
As of 7 March 2024

| No. | Name | Position | Nationality | Place of birth | Date of birth (age) | Previous club | Date signed | Fee | Contract end |
Goalkeepers
| 1 | Viktor Johansson | GK | (Sweden) | Stockholm | 14 September 1998 (age 28) | Leicester City | 2 September 2020 | Free | 30 June 2025 |
| 26 | Dillon Phillips | GK | (England) | Hornchurch | 11 June 1995 (age 31) | (Wales) Cardiff City | 4 July 2023 | Free | 30 June 2025 |
| 33 | Nathaniel Ford | GK | (England) | | 8 July 2004 (age 22) | Academy | 1 July 2023 | Trainee | 30 June 2024 |
Defenders
| 3 | Cohen Bramall | LB | (England) | Crewe | 2 April 1996 (age 30) | Lincoln City | 1 July 2022 | Undisclosed | 30 June 2025 |
| 6 | Tyler Blackett | LB | (England) | Manchester | 2 April 1994 (age 32) | (United States) FC Cincinnati | 8 March 2023 | Free | 30 June 2024 |
| 20 | Grant Hall | CB | (England) | Brighton | 29 October 1991 (age 35) | Midlesbrough | 1 July 2023 | Free | 30 June 2025 |
| 21 | Lee Peltier | RB | (England) | Toxteth | 11 December 1986 (age 39) | Middlesbrough | 28 July 2022 | Free | 30 June 2024 |
| 23 | Sean Morrison | CB | (England) | Plymouth | 8 January 1991 (age 35) | (Wales) Cardiff City | 10 January 2023 | Free | 30 June 2024 |
| 24 | Cameron Humphreys | CB | (England) | Manchester | 22 August 1998 (age 28) | (Belgium) Zulte Waregem | 5 July 2022 | Free | 30 June 2025 |
| 28 | Sebastian Revan | LB | (England) | West Bromwich | 14 July 2003 (age 23) | Aston Villa | 1 September 2023 | Loan | 31 May 2024 |
| 38 | Femi Seriki | RB | (England) | Manchester | 28 April 2002 (age 24) | Sheffield United | 1 February 2024 | Loan | 31 May 2024 |
| 40 | Peter Kioso | RB | (Republic of Ireland) | Swords | 15 August 1999 (age 27) | Luton Town | 1 July 2022 | Undisclosed | 30 June 2025 |
Midfielders
| 7 | Cafú | CM | (Portugal) | Guimarães | 26 February 1993 (age 33) | Nottingham Forest | 8 July 2023 | Free | 30 June 2024 |
| 8 | Sam Clucas | CM | (England) | Lincoln | 25 September 1990 (age 36) | Stoke City | 15 September 2023 | Free | 30 June 2024 |
| 12 | Andy Rinomhota | CM | (Zimbabwe) | (England) Leeds | 21 April 1997 (age 29) | (Wales) Cardiff City | 1 February 2024 | Loan | 31 May 2024 |
| 16 | Jamie Lindsay | CM | (Scotland) | Rutherglen | 11 October 1995 (age 31) | (Scotland) Ross County | 24 July 2019 | Undisclosed | 30 June 2024 |
| 17 | Shane Ferguson | LM | (Northern Ireland) | Derry | 12 July 1991 (age 35) | Millwall | 20 July 2021 | Free | 30 June 2024 |
| 18 | Oliver Rathbone | CM | (England) | Blackburn | 10 October 1996 (age 30) | Rochdale | 4 August 2021 | Undisclosed | 30 June 2024 |
| 22 | Hakeem Odoffin | DM | (England) | Barnet | 13 April 1998 (age 28) | (Scotland) Hamilton Academical | 3 August 2021 | Undisclosed | 30 June 2024 |
| 27 | Christ Tiéhi | DM | (Ivory Coast) | (France) Paris | 16 June 1998 (age 28) | (Czech Republic) Slovan Liberec | 18 August 2023 | Undisclosed | 30 June 2026 |
| 41 | Josh Ayres | CM | (England) | | 24 November 2005 (age 20) | Academy | 1 July 2023 | Trainee | 30 June 2025 |
Forwards
| 9 | Tom Eaves | CF | (England) | Liverpool | 14 January 1992 (age 34) | Hull City | 1 July 2022 | Free | 30 June 2025 |
| 10 | Jordan Hugill | CF | (England) | Middlesbrough | 4 June 1992 (age 34) | Norwich City | 25 January 2023 | Free | 30 June 2026 |
| 11 | Andre Green | LW | (England) | Solihull | 26 July 1998 (age 28) | (Slovakia) Slovan Bratislava | 2 August 2023 | Free | 30 June 2025 |
| 14 | Charlie Wyke | CF | (England) | Middlesbrough | 6 December 1992 (age 33) | Wigan Athletic | 1 February 2024 | Loan | 31 May 2024 |
| 29 | Sam Nombe | CF | (England) | Croydon | 22 October 1998 (age 28) | Exeter City | 31 August 2023 | Undisclosed | 30 June 2027 |
| 30 | Arvin Appiah | RW | (England) | (Netherlands) Amsterdam | 5 January 2001 (age 25) | (Spain) Almería | 25 August 2023 | Loan | 31 May 2024 |
Out on Loan
| 5 | Jamie McCart | CB | (Scotland) | Bellshill | 20 June 1997 (age 29) | (Scotland) St Johnstone | 1 July 2022 | Free | 30 June 2025 |
| 15 | Tolaji Bola | LB | (England) | Camden | 4 January 1999 (age 27) | Arsenal | 10 August 2021 | Undisclosed | 30 June 2024 |
| 19 | Joshua Kayode | CF | (Republic of Ireland) | (Nigeria) Lagos | 4 May 2000 (age 26) | Academy | 1 July 2018 | Trainee | 30 June 2024 |
| 25 | Jake Hull | CB | (England) | Sheffield | 22 October 2001 (age 25) | Academy | 1 July 2020 | Trainee | 30 June 2025 |
| 34 | Curtis Durose | CM | | | 25 October 2003 (age 23) | Academy | 1 July 2022 | Trainee | 30 June 2024 |
| 35 | Ciaran McGuckin | CF | (Northern Ireland) | Leeds | 30 December 2003 (age 22) | Academy | 1 July 2022 | Trainee | 30 June 2024 |
| 36 | Hamish Douglas | CM | (England) | | 4 June 2005 (age 21) | Academy | 22 December 2022 | Trainee | 30 June 2025 |
| 37 | Joel Holvey | CF | (England) | | 20 November 2004 (age 22) | Academy | 1 July 2023 | Trainee | 30 June 2024 |

== Squad statistics ==
=== Player statistics ===
As of 2 March 2024.

Players with zero appearances have been unused substitutes in one or more games.

| No. | Pos. | Nat. | Name | Total | | League | | FA Cup | | EFL Cup | | Other | | Discipline | |
| No. | Pos. | Nat. | Name | Apps | Goals | Apps | Goals | Apps | Goals | Apps | Goals | Apps | Goals | Yellow card | Red card |
|---|---|---|---|---|---|---|---|---|---|---|---|---|---|---|---|
| 1 | GK | (Sweden) | Viktor Johansson | 36 | 0 | 35 | 0 | 1 | 0 | 0 | 0 | 0 | 0 | 4 | 0 |
| 26 | GK | (England) | Dillon Phillips | 2 | 0 | 0 | 0 | 0 | 0 | 2 | 0 | 0 | 0 | 0 | 0 |
| 3 | DF | (England) | Cohen Bramall | 30 | 1 | 27 | 1 | 1 | 0 | 2 | 0 | 0 | 0 | 4 | 0 |
| 4 | DF | (Spain) | Daniel Ayala | 5+2 | 0 | 5+2 | 0 | 0 | 0 | 0 | 0 | 0 | 0 | 2 | 2 |
| 5 | DF | (Scotland) | Jamie McCart | 2+1 | 0 | 0+1 | 0 | 0 | 0 | 2 | 0 | 0 | 0 | 0 | 0 |
| 6 | DF | (England) | Tyler Blackett | 10+2 | 1 | 10 | 1 | 0 | 0 | 0+2 | 0 | 0 | 0 | 1 | 0 |
| 15 | DF | (England) | Tolaji Bola | 1+3 | 0 | 0+2 | 0 | 0 | 0 | 1+1 | 0 | 0 | 0 | 0 | 0 |
| 20 | DF | (England) | Grant Hall | 2+4 | 1 | 2+4 | 1 | 0 | 0 | 0 | 0 | 0 | 0 | 1 | 0 |
| 21 | DF | (England) | Lee Peltier | 16+4 | 2 | 16+3 | 2 | 0+1 | 0 | 0 | 0 | 0 | 0 | 4 | 0 |
| 23 | DF | (England) | Sean Morrison | 22+6 | 2 | 19+6 | 1 | 1 | 0 | 2 | 1 | 0 | 0 | 3 | 0 |
| 24 | DF | (England) | Cameron Humphreys | 14+2 | 0 | 12+2 | 0 | 0 | 0 | 2 | 0 | 0 | 0 | 3 | 0 |
| 28 | DF | (England) | Sebastian Revan | 19+7 | 0 | 18+7 | 0 | 1 | 0 | 0 | 0 | 0 | 0 | 5 | 0 |
| 38 | DF | (England) | Femi Seriki | 1+2 | 0 | 1+2 | 0 | 0 | 0 | 0 | 0 | 0 | 0 | 0 | 0 |
| 40 | DF | (Republic of Ireland) | Peter Kioso | 7+1 | 0 | 7+1 | 0 | 0 | 0 | 0 | 0 | 0 | 0 | 0 | 0 |
| 7 | MF | (Portugal) | Cafú | 16+10 | 2 | 14+10 | 2 | 1 | 0 | 1 | 0 | 0 | 0 | 7 | 1 |
| 8 | MF | (England) | Sam Clucas | 17+8 | 1 | 16+8 | 1 | 1 | 0 | 0 | 0 | 0 | 0 | 4 | 0 |
| 11 | MF | (England) | Andre Green | 8+1 | 0 | 8+1 | 0 | 0 | 0 | 1 | 0 | 0 | 0 | 0 | 0 |
| 12 | MF | (Zimbabwe) | Andy Rinomhota | 4+2 | 0 | 4+2 | 0 | 0 | 0 | 0 | 0 | 0 | 0 | 1 | 0 |
| 16 | MF | (England) | Jamie Lindsay | 11+6 | 1 | 10+6 | 1 | 1 | 0 | 0 | 0 | 0 | 0 | 2 | 0 |
| 17 | MF | (Northern Ireland) | Shane Ferguson | 1+1 | 0 | 1+1 | 0 | 0 | 0 | 0 | 0 | 0 | 0 | 0 | 0 |
| 18 | MF | (England) | Oliver Rathbone | 30+5 | 1 | 29+3 | 1 | 0+1 | 0 | 1+1 | 0 | 0 | 0 | 6 | 0 |
| 22 | MF | (England) | Hakeem Odoffin | 27+3 | 4 | 25+3 | 4 | 1 | 0 | 1 | 0 | 0 | 0 | 4 | 0 |
| 27 | MF | (Ivory Coast) | Christ Tiéhi | 33+2 | 2 | 33 | 2 | 0+1 | 0 | 0+1 | 0 | 0 | 0 | 3 | 0 |
| 30 | MF | (England) | Arvin Appiah | 6+16 | 0 | 5+15 | 0 | 0+1 | 0 | 1 | 0 | 0 | 0 | 1 | 0 |
| 35 | MF | (Northern Ireland) | Ciaran McGuckin | 1+4 | 0 | 0+3 | 0 | 0 | 0 | 1+1 | 0 | 0 | 0 | 0 | 0 |
| 36 | MF | (England) | Hamish Douglas | 0 | 0 | 0 | 0 | 0 | 0 | 0 | 0 | 0 | 0 | 0 | 0 |
| 41 | MF | (England) | Josh Ayres | 0 | 0 | 0 | 0 | 0 | 0 | 0 | 0 | 0 | 0 | 0 | 0 |
| 9 | FW | (England) | Tom Eaves | 5+20 | 4 | 4+19 | 4 | 1 | 0 | 0+1 | 0 | 0 | 0 | 1 | 0 |
| 10 | FW | (England) | Jordan Hugill | 28+9 | 3 | 26+8 | 3 | 1 | 0 | 1+1 | 0 | 0 | 0 | 4 | 0 |
| 14 | FW | (England) | Charlie Wyke | 2+3 | 0 | 2+3 | 0 | 0 | 0 | 0 | 0 | 0 | 0 | 0 | 0 |
| 19 | FW | (Republic of Ireland) | Joshua Kayode | 1+4 | 1 | 0+4 | 0 | 0 | 0 | 1 | 1 | 0 | 0 | 0 | 0 |
| 29 | FW | (England) | Sam Nombe | 17+14 | 2 | 17+13 | 2 | 0+1 | 0 | 0 | 0 | 0 | 0 | 3 | 0 |
Players who left the club permanently during the season
| 2 | DF | (Jamaica) | Dexter Lembikisa | 24+3 | 1 | 22+3 | 1 | 1 | 0 | 1 | 0 | 0 | 0 | 3 | 0 |
| 8 | MF | (England) | Ben Wiles | 3 | 0 | 2 | 0 | 0 | 0 | 1 | 0 | 0 | 0 | 0 | 0 |
| 12 | FW | (Republic of Ireland) | Georgie Kelly | 2+17 | 1 | 1+17 | 1 | 0 | 0 | 1 | 0 | 0 | 0 | 1 | 0 |
| 14 | MF | (Nigeria) | Fred Onyedinma | 15+3 | 2 | 15+1 | 2 | 0 | 0 | 0+2 | 0 | 0 | 0 | 3 | 1 |

=== Goalscorers ===
As of 2 March 2024.

| Place | Position | Nation | Number | Name | Total | League | FA Cup | EFL Cup | Other |
|---|---|---|---|---|---|---|---|---|---|
| 1 | FW | (England) | 9 | Tom Eaves | 4 | 4 | 0 | 0 | 0 |
| = | MF | (England) | 22 | Hakeem Odoffin | 4 | 4 | 0 | 0 | 0 |
| 3 | FW | (England) | 10 | Jordan Hugill | 3 | 3 | 0 | 0 | 0 |
| 4 | MF | (Portugal) | 7 | Cafú | 2 | 2 | 0 | 0 | 0 |
| = | MF | (Nigeria) | 14 | Fred Onyedinma | 2 | 2 | 0 | 0 | 0 |
| = | DF | (England) | 21 | Lee Peltier | 2 | 2 | 0 | 0 | 0 |
| = | MF | (Ivory Coast) | 27 | Christ Tiéhi | 2 | 2 | 0 | 0 | 0 |
| = | FW | (England) | 29 | Sam Nombe | 2 | 2 | 0 | 0 | 0 |
| = | DF | (England) | 23 | Sean Morrison | 2 | 1 | 0 | 1 | 0 |
| 10 | DF | (Jamaica) | 2 | Dexter Lembikisa | 1 | 1 | 0 | 0 | 0 |
| = | DF | (England) | 3 | Cohen Bramall | 1 | 1 | 0 | 0 | 0 |
| = | DF | (England) | 6 | Tyler Blackett | 1 | 1 | 0 | 0 | 0 |
| = | MF | (England) | 8 | Sam Clucas | 1 | 1 | 0 | 0 | 0 |
| = | FW | (Republic of Ireland) | 12 | Georgie Kelly | 1 | 1 | 0 | 0 | 0 |
| = | MF | (Scotland) | 16 | Jamie Lindsay | 1 | 1 | 0 | 0 | 0 |
| = | MF | (England) | 18 | Oliver Rathbone | 1 | 1 | 0 | 0 | 0 |
| = | DF | (England) | 20 | Grant Hall | 1 | 1 | 0 | 0 | 0 |
| = | FW | (Republic of Ireland) | 19 | Joshua Kayode | 1 | 0 | 0 | 1 | 0 |

== Transfers ==
=== In ===
| Date | Pos | Player | Transferred from | Fee | Ref |
|---|---|---|---|---|---|
| 1 July 2023 | CB | (England) Grant Hall | (England) Middlesbrough | Free Transfer | |
| 4 July 2023 | GK | (England) Dillon Phillips | (Wales) Cardiff City | Free Transfer | |
| 8 July 2023 | CM | (Portugal) Cafú | (England) Nottingham Forest | Free Transfer | |
| 2 August 2023 | LW | (England) Andre Green | (Slovakia) Slovan Bratislava | Free Transfer | |
| 18 August 2023 | DM | (Ivory Coast) Christ Tiéhi | (Czech Republic) Slovan Liberec | Undisclosed | |
| 31 August 2023 | CF | (England) Sam Nombe | (England) Exeter City | Undisclosed | |
| 15 September 2023 | CM | (England) Sam Clucas | Free agent | —N/a | |
| 27 October 2023 | CB | (Spain) Daniel Ayala | Free agent | —N/a | |

=== Out ===
| Date | Pos | Player | Transferred to | Fee | Ref |
|---|---|---|---|---|---|
| 30 June 2023 | RB | (Jamaica) Wes Harding | (England) Millwall | Released | |
| 30 June 2023 | GK | (Scotland) Robbie Hemfrey | Free agent | Released | |
| 30 June 2023 | RW | (Republic of Ireland) Chiedozie Ogbene | (England) Luton Town | Free Transfer | |
| 30 June 2023 | CM | (England) Mackenzie Warne | Free agent | Released | |
| 30 June 2023 | GK | (England) Josh Vickers | (England) Derby County | Free Transfer | |
| 30 June 2023 | CB | (England) Richard Wood | (England) Doncaster Rovers | Released | |
| 7 July 2023 | CF | (Northern Ireland) Conor Washington | (England) Derby County | Undisclosed | |
| 25 August 2023 | CM | (England) Ben Wiles | (England) Huddersfield Town | Undisclosed | |
| 1 February 2024 | CF | (Republic of Ireland) Georgie Kelly | (England) Carlisle United | Undisclosed | |
| 7 March 2024 | CB | (Spain) Daniel Ayala | Free agent | Mutual Consent | |

=== Loaned in ===
| Date | Pos | Player | Loaned from | Until | Ref |
|---|---|---|---|---|---|
| 27 July 2023 | LB | (Jamaica) Dexter Lembikisa | (England) Wolverhampton Wanderers | 10 January 2024 (Note: On 10 January, Lembikisa was recalled to Wolves early from his season-long loan.) | |
| 26 July 2023 | AM | (Nigeria) Fred Onyedinma | (England) Luton Town | 10 January 2024 (Note: On 10 January, Onyedinma returned to Luton early from his season-long loan.) | |
| 25 August 2023 | RW | (England) Arvin Appiah | (Spain) Almería | End of Season | |
| 1 September 2023 | LB | (England) Sebastian Revan | (England) Aston Villa | End of Season | |
| 1 February 2024 | CM | (Zimbabwe) Andy Rinomhota | (Wales) Cardiff City | End of Season | |
| 1 February 2024 | RB | (England) Femi Seriki | (England) Sheffield United | End of Season | |
| 1 February 2024 | CF | (England) Charlie Wyke | (England) Wigan Athletic | End of Season | |

=== Loaned out ===
| Date | Pos | Player | Loaned to | Until | Ref |
|---|---|---|---|---|---|
| 18 July 2023 | RB | (Republic of Ireland) Peter Kioso | (England) Peterborough United | 2 January 2024 (Note: On 2 January, Kioso was recalled early from his loan at Peterborough.) | |
| 2 August 2023 | CM | (England) Curtis Durose | (England) Scarborough Athletic | 1 February 2024 (Note: On 4 January, Durose's loan at Scarborough was extended by a further month.) | |
| 4 August 2023 | CB | (England) Jake Hull | (England) Buxton | End of season | |
| 11 August 2023 | CF | (England) Joel Holvey | (England) Gainsborough Trinity | End of season (Note: On 5 January, Holvey's loan at Gainsborough was extended until the end of the season.) | |
| 31 August 2023 | CB | (Scotland) Jamie McCart | (England) Barnsley | End of season | |
| 1 September 2023 | CF | (Republic of Ireland) Joshua Kayode | (England) Carlisle United | End of season | |
| 22 September 2023 | CM | (England) Hamish Douglas | (England) Gainsborough Trinity | End of season (Note: On 5 January, Douglas' loan at Gainsborough was extended until the end of the season.) | |
| 23 January 2024 | LB | (England) Tolaji Bola | (England) Burton Albion | End of season | |
| 1 February 2024 | CF | (Northern Ireland) Ciaran McGuckin | (Republic of Ireland) Dundalk | End of season | |
| 19 February 2024 | CM | (England) Curtis Durose | (England) Matlock Town | End of Season | |
| 26 February 2024 | CF | (England) Ed Mare | (England) Sheppey United | 25 March 2024 | |

== Pre-season and friendlies ==
On 17 May, The Millers announced their first pre-season friendly, against Mansfield Town. Five days later, a second fixture was confirmed, against Parkgate. A third match was added against Lincoln City. In June, Premier League side Sheffield United was added to the pre-season schedule. On 6 June, a fifth and final pre-season fixture was announced, against Middlesbrough.

Also confirmed by the club was a week-long warm weather training camp in Murcia, Spain between 8 and 15 July.

Win Draw Loss Fixtures

| 7 July 2023 Friendly | Parkgate | 0–2 | Rotherham United | Parkgate |
| 19:00 BST | | Report | Bramall 26'; Kelly 35' | Stadium: Roundwood Sports Complex |

| 15 July 2023 Friendly | Elche | 1–0 | Rotherham United | Spain |
| 10:00 CEST; 09:00 BST | El Ghezouani 72' | Report |

| 19 July 2023 Friendly | Rotherham United | 0–2 | Middlesbrough | Rotherham |
| 19:00 BST | | Report | Silvera 6'; Gilbert 88' | Stadium: New York Stadium; Attendance: 2,017 (489 away); Referee: Thomas Bramall |

| 22 July 2023 Friendly | Mansfield Town | 2–4 | Rotherham United | Mansfield |
| 15:00 BST | Quinn 4'; Oates 40' | Report | Trialist 2'; Kelly 25', 55', 58' | Stadium: Field Mill; Attendance: 2,154 (437 away); Referee: Declan Bourne |

| 25 July 2023 Friendly | Rotherham United | 1–0 | Sheffield United | Rotherham |
| 19:00 BST | Trialist 12' | Report | | Stadium: New York Stadium; Attendance: 7,216 (3,779 away); Referee: Andrew Madley |

| 29 July 2023 Friendly | Lincoln City | 0–3 | Rotherham United | Lincoln |
| 15:00 BST | | Report | Rathbone 45'; Cafú 48'; Hugill 60' | Stadium: Sincil Bank; Attendance: 2,535 (465 away); Referee: Darren Drysdale |

== Competitions ==
=== Overall record ===
| Competition | First match | Last match | Starting round | Final position | Record | | | | | | | |
| Competition | First match | Last match | Starting round | Final position | Pld | W | D | L | GF | GA | GD | Win % |
|---|---|---|---|---|---|---|---|---|---|---|---|---|
| Championship | 5 August 2023 | 4 May 2024 | Matchday 1 | 24th | 46 | 5 | 12 | 29 | 37 | 89 | −52 | 10.87 |
| FA Cup | 5 January 2024 | | Third round | Third round | 1 | 0 | 0 | 1 | 0 | 1 | −1 | 0.00 |
| EFL Cup | 8 August 2023 | 29 August 2023 | First round | Second round | 2 | 0 | 1 | 1 | 2 | 7 | −5 | 0.00 |
| Total | | | | | 49 | 5 | 13 | 31 | 39 | 97 | −58 | 10.20 |

Source: Soccerway

=== Championship ===
==== League table ====
| Pos | Team | Pld | W | D | L | GF | GA | GD | Pts | Promotion, qualification or relegation |
|---|---|---|---|---|---|---|---|---|---|---|
| 19 | Blackburn Rovers | 46 | 14 | 11 | 21 | 60 | 74 | −14 | 53 | |
| 20 | Sheffield Wednesday | 46 | 15 | 8 | 23 | 44 | 68 | −24 | 53 | |
| 21 | Plymouth Argyle | 46 | 13 | 12 | 21 | 59 | 70 | −11 | 51 | |
| 22 | Birmingham City (R) | 46 | 13 | 11 | 22 | 50 | 65 | −15 | 50 | Relegated to EFL League One |
| 23 | Huddersfield Town (R) | 46 | 9 | 18 | 19 | 48 | 77 | −29 | 45 | Relegated to EFL League One |
| 24 | Rotherham United (R) | 46 | 5 | 12 | 29 | 37 | 89 | −52 | 27 | Relegated to EFL League One |

Source: EFL official website
Rules for classification: 1) Points; 2) Goal difference; 3) Number of goals scored; 4) Head-to-head results; 5) Wins; 6) Away goals; 7) Penalty points (sec 9.5); 8) Number of 12-point sending off offences; 9) Play-off (only if needed to determine promotion/relegation)
(R) Relegated

==== Results summary ====
| Overall | | | | | | | | Home | | | | | | Away | | | | | |
| Pld | W | D | L | GF | GA | GD | Pts | W | D | L | GF | GA | GD | W | D | L | GF | GA | GD |
|---|---|---|---|---|---|---|---|---|---|---|---|---|---|---|---|---|---|---|---|
| 46 | 5 | 12 | 29 | 37 | 89 | −52 | 27 | 5 | 8 | 10 | 24 | 28 | −4 | 0 | 4 | 19 | 13 | 61 | −48 |

Source: Soccerway

==== Results by round ====
| Round | 1 | 2 | 3 | 4 | 5 | 6 | 7 | 8 | 9 | 10 | 11 | 13 | 14 | 15 | 12^{1} | 16 | 17 | 18 | 19 | 20 | 21 | 22 | 23 | 24 | 25 | 26 | 27 | 28 | 30 | 31 | 32 | 33 | 29^{2} | 34 | 35 | 36 | 37 | 38 | 39 | 40 | 41 | 42 | 43 | 44 | 45 | 46 |
|---|---|---|---|---|---|---|---|---|---|---|---|---|---|---|---|---|---|---|---|---|---|---|---|---|---|---|---|---|---|---|---|---|---|---|---|---|---|---|---|---|---|---|---|---|---|---|
| Ground | A | H | A | H | H | A | A | H | A | H | A | H | A | H | H | A | H | A | A | H | H | A | A | H | H | A | H | A | H | A | H | H | A | A | H | A | A | H | A | H | H | A | A | H | A | H |
| Result | L | D | L | L | W | L | L | D | L | L | D | W | L | D | D | L | D | L | D | L | L | L | L | W | D | D | L | D | L | L | L | L | L | L | L | L | L | D | L | W | L | L | L | D | L | W |
| Position | 23 | 20 | 22 | 21 | 20 | 21 | 21 | 23 | 23 | 23 | 23 | 22 | 22 | 22 | 22 | 22 | 22 | 23 | 23 | 24 | 24 | 24 | 24 | 24 | 24 | 24 | 24 | 24 | 24 | 24 | 24 | 24 | 24 | 24 | 24 | 24 | 24 | 24 | 24 | 24 | 24 | 24 | 24 | 24 | 24 | 24 |

Source: Soccerway
A = Away; H = Home; W = Win; D = Draw; L = Loss; P = Postponed
Notes:
- ^{1} Matchday 12 (vs Ipswich Town) was postponed due to Storm Babet.
- ^{2} Matchday 29 (vs Ipswich Town) was postponed due opposition's FA Cup progression.

==== Matches ====
On 22 June, the Championship fixtures were released.

Win Draw Loss Fixtures

| 5 August 2023 1 | Stoke City | 4–1 | Rotherham United | Stoke-on-Trent |
| 15:00 BST | Hoever 5'; Brown (yellow card) 30' (goal) 90'; Pearson (yellow card) 45+2'; Vidigal 45+3', 45+8'; Johnson (yellow card) 74'; Laurent (yellow card) 88'; Thompson (yellow card) 90+5' | Report | Bramall (yellow card) 25'; Odoffin (yellow card) 28'; Morrison (yellow card) 45+2'; Peltier 46'; Cafú (yellow card) 52' (yellow-red card) 69' | Stadium: bet365 Stadium; Attendance: 22,601; Referee: John Busby |

| 12 August 2023 2 | Rotherham United | 2–2 | Blackburn Rovers | Rotherham |
| 15:00 BST | Odoffin 23'; Cafú (yellow card) 33'; Lembikisa (yellow card) 45+1'; Onyedinma 48', (yellow card) 49' (yellow-red card) 50'; Johansson (yellow card) 55' | Report | Szmodics (penalty missed) 15', (yellow card) 38', (goal) 75', 78' | Stadium: New York Stadium; Attendance: 10,828; Referee: Bobby Madley |

| 19 August 2023 3 | Sunderland | 2–1 | Rotherham United | Sunderland |
| 15:00 BST | Cirkin (yellow card) 10'; Bellingham 22', 52' (yellow card) 69' | Report | Odoffin 20'; Bramall (yellow card) 33' | Stadium: Stadium of Light; Attendance: 40,688; Referee: Gavin Ward |

| 26 August 2023 4 | Rotherham United | 1–2 | Leicester City | Rotherham |
| 15:00 BST | Onyedinma 53'; Rathbone (yellow card) 87'; Humphreys (yellow card) 90' | Report | McAteer 12', 84'; Mavididi (yellow card) 89'; Hermansen (yellow card) 90+3' | Stadium: New York Stadium; Attendance: 11,418; Referee: Simon Hooper |

| 2 September 2023 5 | Rotherham United | 2–1 | Norwich City | Rotherham |
| 15:00 BST | Lembikisa 22'; Hugill (yellow card) 36' (goal) 40'; Rathbone (yellow card) 45+1' | Report | Stacey (yellow card) 43'; Fassnacht 50' | Stadium: New York Stadium; Attendance: 11,016; Referee: Sam Barrott |

| 16 September 2023 6 | Huddersfield Town | 2–0 | Rotherham United | Huddersfield |
| 15:00 BST | Koroma 18'; Thomas 70'; Diarra (yellow card) 88' | Report | Humphreys (yellow card) 65' | Stadium: Kirklees Stadium; Attendance: 19,050; Referee: Jeremy Simpson |

| 20 September 2023 7 | Millwall | 3–0 | Rotherham United | Bermondsey |
| 19:45 BST | Longman 27' (yellow card) 64'; Flemming 58'; Bradshaw 90+3' | Report | Revan (yellow card) 63' | Stadium: The Den; Attendance: 12,563; Referee: Geoff Eltringham |

| 23 September 2023 8 | Rotherham United | 1–1 | Preston North End | Rotherham |
| 15:00 BST | Hugill 35'; Rathbone (yellow card) 38'; Clucas (yellow card) 55'; Blackett (yellow card) 69' | Report | Lindsay 45'; Potts (yellow card) 59'; Brady (yellow card) 70' | Stadium: New York Stadium; Attendance: 11,434; Referee: Sam Allison |

| 30 September 2023 9 | Cardiff City | 2–0 | Rotherham United | Cardiff |
| 15:00 BST | Siopis (yellow card) 35'; Goutas (yellow card) 46'; Etete 56'; Ng 90' | Report | | Stadium: Cardiff City Stadium; Attendance: 20,136; Referee: Leigh Doughty |

| 4 October 2023 10 | Rotherham United | 1–2 | Bristol City | Rotherham |
| 20:00 BST | Rathbone (yellow card) 43'; Blackett 86' | Report | Conway 81', 90+5'; Roberts (yellow card) 90' | Stadium: New York Stadium; Attendance: 9,221; Referee: Dean Whitestone |

| 7 October 2023 11 | Southampton | 1–1 | Rotherham United | Southampton |
| 15:00 BST | Armstrong 2'; Sulemana (yellow card) 33'; Bednarek (yellow card) 82' | Report | Peltier (yellow card) 31'; Tiéhi (yellow card) 68'; Hugill 74'; Clucas (yellow card) 76'; Lembikisa (yellow card) 84'; Kelly (yellow card) 90+2'; Appiah (yellow card) 90+4' | Stadium: St Mary's Stadium; Attendance: 28,404; Referee: John Busby |

| 25 October 2023 13 | Rotherham United | 2–0 | Coventry City | Rotherham |
| 19:45 BST | Peltier 51'; Cafú (yellow card) 60'; Lembikisa (yellow card) 66'; Rathbone 90+4' | Report | Thomas (yellow card) 90+2' | Stadium: New York Stadium; Attendance: 10,553; Referee: Lewis Smith |

| 29 October 2023 14 | Sheffield Wednesday | 2–0 | Rotherham United | Sheffield |
| 13:00 BST | Smith 11', 36'; Bernard (yellow card) 45+3'; Dawson (yellow card) 90+4' | Report | Peltier (yellow card) 39'; Tiéhi (yellow card) 47'; Hugill (yellow card) 82' | Stadium: Hillsborough Stadium; Attendance: 29,038; Referee: Andy Davies |

| 4 November 2023 15 | Rotherham United | 1–1 | Queens Park Rangers | Rotherham |
| 15:00 GMT | Bramall (yellow card) 21'; Clucas (yellow card) 37'; Kelly 70' | Report | Chair (yellow card) 19' (goal) 50' | Stadium: New York Stadium; Attendance: 10,199; Referee: Sam Barrott |

| 7 November 2023 12 | Rotherham United | 2–2 | Ipswich Town | Rotherham |
| 20:00 BST | Nombe 4'; Revan (yellow card) 76'; Tiéhi 90+2' | Report | Morsy 19' (yellow card) 82'; Taylor 87' | Stadium: New York Stadium; Attendance: 10,800; Referee: Graham Scott |
Note: The match was originally scheduled for 20 October 2023, but was postponed due to Storm Babet.

| 11 November 2023 16 | Watford | 5–0 | Rotherham United | Watford |
| 15:00 GMT | Rajović 10', 45+4'; Kayembe 54'; Porteous (yellow card) 58'; Asprilla (yellow card) 61'; Ince 86'; Matheus Martins 90+4' | Report | Cafú (yellow card) 45' | Stadium: Vicarage Road; Attendance: 17,349; Referee: Stephen Martin |

| 24 November 2023 17 | Rotherham United | 1–1 | Leeds United | Rotherham |
| 20:00 GMT | Odoffin 45+1' | Report | Summerville 6' | Stadium: New York Stadium; Attendance: 11,471; Referee: Oliver Langford |

| 28 November 2023 18 | Hull City | 4–1 | Rotherham United | Kingston upon Hull |
| 19:45 GMT | Morton 5'; Philogene 9', 48'; Twine 20'; McLoughlin (yellow card) 88' | Report | Hugill (yellow card) 41'; Hall 59'; Revan (yellow card) 62' | Stadium: MKM Stadium; Attendance: 19,766; Referee: Rebecca Welch |

| 2 December 2023 19 | Birmingham City | 0–0 | Rotherham United | Birmingham |
| 15:00 GMT | James (yellow card) 62' | Report | Lindsay (yellow card) 61'; Peltier (yellow card) 71'; Bramall (yellow card) 86' | Stadium: St Andrew's; Referee: Andy Davies |

| 9 December 2023 20 | Rotherham United | 1–2 | Swansea City | Rotherham |
| 15:00 GMT | Ayala (yellow card) 12' (yellow-red card) 17'; Nombe 64'; Rathbone (yellow card) 79'; Hall (yellow card) 86' | Report | Darling (yellow card) 18'; Lowe (yellow card) 39'; Patino 45'; Yates 73'; Humphreys (yellow card) 90+6' | Stadium: New York Stadium; Attendance: 9,414; Referee: Josh Smith |

| 12 December 2023 21 | Rotherham United | 0–2 | West Bromwich Albion | Rotherham |
| 19:45 GMT | | Report | Furlong (yellow card) 8'; Diangana 54'; Wallace 90' | Stadium: New York Stadium; Attendance: 9,567; Referee: Sam Barrott |

| 16 December 2023 22 | Plymouth Argyle | 3–2 | Rotherham United | Plymouth |
| 15:00 GMT | Azaz 45+5' (pen.), 52'; Whittaker 90+6' | Report | Lindsay 16' (yellow card) 49'; Ayala (yellow card) 25' (yellow-red card) 55'; Odoffin (yellow card) 36'; Nombe (yellow card) 45+3'; Eaves 77'; Rathbone (yellow card) 90+2'; Johansson (yellow card) 90+3' | Stadium: Home Park; Attendance: 16,025; Referee: Gavin Ward |

| 23 December 2023 23 | Leicester City | 3–0 | Rotherham United | Leicester |
| 15:00 GMT | Fatawu (yellow card) 45'; Daka 60', 65' (pen.); Casadei 72' | Report | Johansson (yellow card) 64' | Stadium: King Power Stadium; Attendance: 31,175; Referee: Darren Bond |

| 26 December 2023 24 | Rotherham United | 1–0 | Middlesbrough | Rotherham |
| 15:00 GMT | Bramall 72' | Report | | Stadium: New York Stadium; Attendance: 11,487; Referee: Andrew Kitchen |

| 29 December 2023 25 | Rotherham United | 1–1 | Sunderland | Rotherham |
| 19:45 GMT | Clucas 48'; Nombe (yellow card) 65'; Cafú (yellow card) 90+4' | Report | Bellingham (yellow card) 40'; Clarke 73' | Stadium: New York Stadium; Attendance: 11,323; Referee: Tony Harrington |

| 1 January 2023 26 | Blackburn Rovers | 2–2 | Rotherham United | Blackburn |
| 15:00 GMT | Sigurðsson 8'; Szmodics 46' | Report | Morrison 31', (yellow card) 44'; Eaves 82' | Stadium: Ewood Park; Attendance: 13,054; Referee: Jarred Gillett |

| 13 January 2024 27 | Rotherham United | 0–1 | Stoke City | Rotherham |
| 15:00 GMT | Eaves (yellow card) 86'; Cafú (yellow card) 88' | Report | Baker 45+4'; Burger (yellow card) 78'; Pearson (yellow card) 90+4'; Thompson (yellow card) 90+8' | Stadium: New York Stadium; Attendance: 11,002; Referee: Keith Stroud |

| 20 January 2024 28 | Middlesbrough | 1–1 | Rotherham United | Middlesbrough |
| 15:00 GMT | Hackney (yellow card) 45+1'; Forss 82' | Report | Morrison (yellow card) 40'; Cafú 59'; Johansson (yellow card) 69'; Clucas (yellow card) 73' | Stadium: Riverside Stadium; Attendance: 26,140; Referee: Darren Bond |

| 3 February 2024 30 | Rotherham United | 0–2 | Southampton | Rotherham |
| 15:00 GMT | | Report | Bednarek 4'; A. Armstrong 38'; Downes (yellow card) 57'; S. Armstrong (yellow card) 60' | Stadium: New York Stadium; Attendance: 11,179; Referee: Sunny Gill |

| 10 February 2024 31 | Leeds United | 3–0 | Rotherham United | Leeds |
| 15:00 GMT | Bamford 10'; Summerville 52', 60' | Report | Hugill (yellow card) 18'; Nombe (yellow card) 73' | Stadium: Elland Road; Attendance: 35,261; Referee: Andy Madley |

| 13 February 2024 32 | Rotherham United | 1–2 | Hull City | Rotherham |
| 19:45 GMT | Tiéhi 4'; Revan (yellow card) 89' | Report | Philogene (yellow card) 30'; Humphreys 71' (o.g.); Ohio 75' | Stadium: New York Stadium; Attendance: 10,668; Referee: Leigh Doughty |

| 17 February 2024 33 | Rotherham United | 0–1 | Watford | Rotherham |
| 15:00 GMT | Rinomhota (yellow card) 64'; Revan (yellow card) 68' | Report | Asprilla 58'; Hamer (yellow card) 73' | Stadium: New York Stadium; Attendance: 10,143; Referee: Andrew Kitchen |

| 20 February 2024 29 | Ipswich Town | 4–3 | Rotherham United | Ipswich |
| 19:45 GMT | Burns 9', 29'; Moore 14'; Hutchinson 90+5'; Tuanzebe (yellow card) 90+9' | Report | Eaves 2'; Odoffin (yellow card) 8', (goal) 60'; Peltier (yellow card) 62'; Cafú 90+4' (pen.) | Stadium: Portman Road; Attendance: 28,026; Referee: Keith Stroud |
Note: Fixture was originally scheduled for 27 January, but was postponed due to Ipswich's FA Cup progression.

| 24 February 2024 34 | Queens Park Rangers | 2–1 | Rotherham United | Shepherd's Bush |
| 15:00 GMT | Hayden (yellow card) 33'; Hodge (yellow card) 42'; Colback (yellow card) 54'; Smyth 61', (yellow card) 90+1'; Willock 75' | Report | Eaves 7'; Humphreys (yellow card) 38' | Stadium: Loftus Road; Attendance: 16,351; Referee: Matt Donohue |

| 2 March 2024 35 | Rotherham United | 0–1 | Sheffield Wednesday | Rotherham |
| 15:00 GMT | Odoffin (yellow card) 35' | Report | Ugbo (yellow card) 54', (goal) 66'; Smith (yellow card) 88' | Stadium: New York Stadium; Attendance: 11,541; Referee: David Webb |

| 5 March 2024 36 | Coventry City | 5–0 | Rotherham United | Coventry |
| 19:45 GMT | Simms 5', 27', 37'; Latibeaudiere 23'; Tavares 90+1' | Report | Hugill (yellow card) 54' | Stadium: Coventry Building Society Arena; Attendance: 22,092; Referee: John Busby |

| 9 March 2024 37 | Norwich City | 5–0 | Rotherham United | Norwich |
| 15:00 GMT | Sara 13', 47'; Sørensen 21'; Sainz 32'; Sargent 45+1' | Report | | Stadium: Carrow Road; Attendance: 26,111; Referee: Charles Breakspear |

| 16 March 2024 38 | Rotherham United | 0–0 | Huddersfield Town | Rotherham |
| 15:00 GMT | Rathbone (yellow card) 68'; Revan (yellow card) 74' | Report | Spencer (yellow card) 26'; Kasumu (yellow card) 36'; Thomas (yellow card) 54' (yellow-red card) 58' | Stadium: New York Stadium; Attendance: 11,033; Referee: Josh Smith |

| 29 March 2024 39 | Preston North End | 3–0 | Rotherham United | Preston |
| 15:00 GMT | Holmes 22'; Riis Jakobsen 37', 42'; Hughes (yellow card) 68'; L. Lindsay (yellow card) 74' | Report | Rathbone (yellow card) 44'; J. Lindsay (yellow card) 90+4' | Stadium: Deepdale; Attendance: 15,470; Referee: Stephen Martin |

| 1 April 2024 40 | Rotherham United | 2–1 | Millwall | Rotherham |
| 15:00 GMT | Revan 71'; Clucas (yellow card) 75'; Rinomhota (yellow card) 79'; Wyke 86' | Report | Longman 78' | Stadium: New York Stadium; Attendance: 9,803; Referee: Alex Chilowicz |

| 5 April 2024 41 | Rotherham United | 0–1 | Plymouth Argyle | Rotherham |
| 20:00 BST | | Report | Mumba 32' | Stadium: New York Stadium; Attendance: 9,863; Referee: Oliver Langford |

| 10 April 2024 42 | West Bromwich Albion | 2–0 | Rotherham United | West Bromwich |
| 20:00 BST | Thomas-Asante 23'; Swift 45+1' (pen.) | Report | Rinomhota (yellow card) 87' | Stadium: The Hawthorns; Attendance: 22,331; Referee: Geoff Eltringham |

| 13 April 2024 43 | Swansea City | 1–0 | Rotherham United | Swansea |
| 15:00 BST | Cooper (yellow card) 54'; Fulton (yellow card) 67'; Rinomhota 74' (o.g.); Grimes (yellow card) 87' | Report | Peltier (yellow card) 30'; Humphreys (yellow card) 34' | Stadium: Swansea.com Stadium; Attendance: 15,327; Referee: Leigh Doughty |

| 20 April 2024 44 | Rotherham United | 0–0 | Birmingham City | Rotherham |
| 15:00 BST | Hugill (yellow card) 51'; Humphreys (yellow card) 52'; Eaves (yellow card) 84'; Peltier (yellow card) 87' | Report | Anderson (yellow card) 63'; Stansfield (yellow card) 76' | Stadium: New York Stadium; Attendance: 11,001; Referee: Keith Stroud |

| 27 April 2024 45 | Bristol City | 2–0 | Rotherham United | Bristol |
| 15:00 BST | Conway 32'; Twine 57' | Report | | Stadium: Ashton Gate; Attendance: 22,873; Referee: Charles Breakspear |

| 4 May 2024 46 | Rotherham United | 5–2 | Cardiff City | Rotherham |
| 12:30 BST | Hugill 25', 69'; Eaves 45+2', 57' (pen.); Appiah (yellow card) 60'; Nombe 63' | Report | Phillips 38'; Tanner 47' | Stadium: New York Stadium; Attendance: 10,547; Referee: Andy Davies |

=== FA Cup ===
As a Championship side, Rotherham entered the FA Cup in the third round and were drawn away to Fulham.

Win Draw Loss Fixtures

| 5 January 2024 Third round | Fulham | 1–0 | Rotherham United | Fulham |
| 19:30 GMT | Decordova-Reid 24' | Report | | Stadium: Craven Cottage; Attendance: 15,083; Referee: Dean Whitestone |

=== EFL Cup ===
Rotherham were drawn at home to Morecambe in the first round and away to Stoke City in the second round.

Win Draw Loss Fixtures

| 8 August 2023 First round | Rotherham United | 1–1 (4–2 p) | Morecambe | Rotherham |
| 19:45 BST | Kayode 37'; Onyedinma (yellow card) 89' | Report | Mellon 22'; Moore (yellow card) 59' | Stadium: New York Stadium; Attendance: 2,834; Referee: Thomas Parsons |
| | Penalties |
| | Hugill (penalty scored); Rathbone (penalty scored); Blackett (penalty scored); Onyedinma (penalty scored) | | (penalty scored) McKiernan; (penalty scored) Davenport; (penalty missed) Brown; (penalty missed) Taylor |

| 29 August 2023 Second round | Stoke City | 6–1 | Rotherham United | Stoke-on-Trent |
| 19:45 BST | Burger 2'; Mmaee 18'; Laurent 29', 55'; Campbell 43'; Léris 72' | Report | Morrison 22' | Stadium: bet365 Stadium; Attendance: 9,410; Referee: Michael Salisbury |
