= 2022–23 Exeter City F.C. season =

Exeter City
2022–23 season
- Owner: Exeter City Supporters' Trust
- Chairman: Nick Hawker
- Manager: Matt Taylor (until 4 October); Gary Caldwell (from 24 October)
- Stadium: St James Park
- League One: 14th
- FA Cup: Second round
- EFL Cup: Second round
- EFL Trophy: Group stage
- Top goalscorer: League: Sam Nombe (15 goals); All: Sam Nombe (17 goals)
- Highest home attendance: 8,046 (vs Plymouth Argyle, 15 April)
- Lowest home attendance: 1,074 (vs Southampton U21, 4 October)
- Average home league attendance: 6,846
- Biggest win: All: 7–0 vs Cheltenham Town (9 August 2022); League: 5–0 vs Accrington Stanley (25 March 2023)
- Biggest defeat: 0–6 vs Ipswich Town (29 April 2023)
Home colours	Away colours	Third colours

The 2022–23 season was the 121st season in the existence of Exeter City Football Club and the club's first season in the League One since the 2011–12 season following their promotion in the previous season. In addition to the league, they also competed in the 2022–23 EFL Cup, being eliminated in the second round by Gillingham, and the 2022–23 EFL Trophy, failing to qualify from the group stage. The team also competed in the 2022–23 FA Cup, being eliminated in the second round by Oxford United.

== First team squad ==
Note: Flags indicate national team as has been defined under FIFA eligibility rules. Players may hold more than one non-FIFA nationality.

=== Statistics ===
As of match played on 7 May 2023

No.	Pos	Nat	Player	Total		League One		FA Cup		EFL Cup		EFL Trophy	
No.	Pos	Nat	Player	Apps	Goals	Apps	Goals	Apps	Goals	Apps	Goals	Apps	Goals
2	DF	(England) ENG	Jake Caprice	42	1	29+8	1	2+0	0	2+0	0	1+0	0
3	DF	(England) ENG	Jack Sparkes	40	2	25+10	1	1+0	0	1+1	1	2+0	0
5	DF	(England) ENG	Alex Hartridge	47	0	42+1	0	2+0	0	1+0	0	1+0	0
6	MF	(England) ENG	Rekeem Harper*	23	1	13+7	1	0+0	0	0+0	0	3+0	0
7	DF	(England) ENG	Demetri Mitchell	16	2	12+4	2	0+0	0	0+0	0	0+0	0
8	MF	(England) ENG	Archie Collins	49	6	44+1	4	2+0	1	1+1	1	0+0	0
9	FW	(England) ENG	Jay Stansfield*	39	9	28+8	9	1+1	0	0+0	0	1+0	0
10	FW	(England) ENG	Sam Nombe	47	17	34+9	15	2+0	0	1+1	2	0+0	0
11	MF	(England) ENG	Joe White*	16	0	6+10	0	0+0	0	0+0	0	0+0	0
12	DF	(England) ENG	Joshua Key	48	4	38+4	4	2+0	0	1+1	0	0+2	0
14	DF	(England) ENG	Will Aimson	18	0	18+0	0	0+0	0	0+0	0	0+0	0
15	MF	(South Africa) RSA	Kegs Chauke*	26	2	10+10	0	0+1	0	0+2	0	3+0	2
16	MF	(England) ENG	Harry Kite	44	4	32+8	3	0+1	0	2+0	1	1+0	0
17	MF	(England) ENG	Kyle Taylor	0	0	0+0	0	0+0	0	0+0	0	0+0	0
18	GK	(England) ENG	Jamal Blackman	41	0	37+1	0	2+0	0	0+0	0	1+0	0
19	FW	(England) ENG	Sonny Cox	17	1	2+10	1	0+0	0	0+2	0	3+0	0
20	FW	(Jamaica) JAM	Jevani Brown	32	14	24+3	12	2+0	2	1+0	0	0+2	0
21	MF	(England) ENG	Josh Coley	12	1	3+6	0	0+0	0	2+0	1	1+0	0
22	GK	(England) ENG	Harry Lee	2	0	0+1	0	0+0	0	0+0	0	1+0	0
23	FW	(Scotland) SCO	James Scott	15	1	4+11	1	0+0	0	0+0	0	0+0	0
26	DF	(Republic of Ireland) IRL	Pierce Sweeney	49	2	40+3	2	2+0	0	2+0	0	2+0	0
27	DF	(England) ENG	Jonathan Grounds	22	1	8+10	1	0+1	0	1+1	0	1+0	0
29	MF	(Scotland) SCO	Kevin McDonald	11	3	8+3	3	0+0	0	0+0	0	0+0	0
33	GK	(England) ENG	Gary Woods	7	0	7+0	0	0+0	0	0+0	0	0+0	0
39	DF	(England) ENG	Cheick Diabate	23	1	18+2	1	1+0	0	0+1	0	1+0	0
41	MF	(Portugal) POR	Pedro Borges	7	0	2+3	0	0+0	0	0+0	0	0+2	0
42	MF	(England) ENG	Harrison King	2	0	0+0	0	0+0	0	0+0	0	2+0	0
44	MF	(England) ENG	Gabriel Billington	2	0	0+0	0	0+0	0	0+0	0	1+1	0
45	DF	(Wales) WAL	Ed James	3	0	0+1	0	0+0	0	0+0	0	2+0	0
46	MF	(England) ENG	Joe Wragg	1	0	0+0	0	0+0	0	0+0	0	0+1	0
48	MF	(England) ENG	Alfie Clark	1	0	0+0	0	0+0	0	0+0	0	0+1	0
49	MF	(England) ENG	Mitch Beardmore	1	0	0+0	0	0+0	0	0+0	0	1+0	0
51	DF	(England) ENG	Joe O'Connor	1	0	0+0	0	0+0	0	0+0	0	0+1	0
Players who left the club during the season:
4	DF	(England) ENG	Sam Stubbs	4	0	2+0	0	0+0	0	2+0	0	0+0	0
7	FW	(England) ENG	Matt Jay	25	4	6+12	0	0+2	1	2+0	1	3+0	2
11	FW	(England) ENG	Harry Smith*	5	0	0+5	0	0+0	0	0+0	0	0+0	0
14	MF	(France) FRA	Timothée Dieng	21	3	12+5	3	2+0	0	1+0	0	1+0	0
24	GK	(Iceland) ISL	Jökull Andrésson*	1	0	1+0	0	0+0	0	0+0	0	0+0	0
34	DF	(England) ENG	Alfie Pond	1	0	0+0	0	0+0	0	0+1	0	0+0	0
40	GK	(England) ENG	Scott Brown	4	0	1+0	0	0+0	0	2+0	0	1+0	0

== Transfers ==
=== In ===
Date	Pos	Player	Transferred from	Fee	Ref
26 July 2022	GK	(England) Jamal Blackman	(England) Huddersfield Town	Free Transfer	
26 January 2023	LWB	(England) Demetri Mitchell	(Scotland) Hibernian	Undisclosed	
27 January 2023	CB	(England) Will Aimson	(England) Bolton Wanderers	Undisclosed	
31 January 2023	DM	(Scotland) Kevin McDonald	Unattached	Free Transfer	
31 January 2023	CF	(Scotland) James Scott	(England) Hull City	Free Transfer	
1 February 2023	GK	(England) Gary Woods	(Scotland) Kilmarnock	Free Transfer	

=== Out ===
Date	Pos	Player	Transferred to	Fee	Ref
27 June 2022	CB	(Wales) George Ray	(England) Barrow	Mutual consent	
30 June 2022	DM	(France) Nigel Atangana	(England) Eastleigh	Released	
30 June 2022	LB	(England) Colin Daniel	(England) Scunthorpe United	Released	
30 June 2022	AM	(England) James Dodd	(England) Weston-super-Mare	Released	
30 June 2022	CB	(England) Jordan Dyer	(England) Bath City	Released	
30 June 2022	RB	(England) Ellis Johnson	Unattached	Released	
30 June 2022	LB	(England) Callum Rowe	(England) Yeovil Town	Released	
30 June 2022	CF	(England) Ben Seymour	(England) Plymouth Parkway	Released	
30 June 2022	AM	(England) Jack Veale	Unattached	Released	
2 September 2022	CB	(England) Alfie Pond	(England) Wolverhampton Wanderers	Undisclosed	
9 January 2023	SS	(England) Matt Jay	(England) Colchester United	Undisclosed	
11 January 2023	DM	(France) Timothée Dieng	(England) Gillingham	Undisclosed	
31 January 2023	CB	(England) Sam Stubbs	(England) Bradford City	Free Transfer	
24 March 2023	LW	(England) Nelson Iseguan	(England) Tiverton Town	Mutual consent	

=== Loans in ===
Date	Pos	Player	Loaned from	On loan until	Ref
26 July 2022	CM	(South Africa) Kegs Chauke	(England) Southampton	End of Season	
24 August 2022	CM	(England) Rekeem Harper	(England) Ipswich Town	End of Season	
1 September 2022	CF	(England) Harry Smith	(England) Leyton Orient	22 October 2022 (Note: Originally a season-long loan, Smiths's loan at Exeter City was cut short for personal reasons.)	
2 September 2022	CF	(England) Jay Stansfield	(England) Fulham	End of Season	
6 January 2023	AM	(England) Joe White	(England) Newcastle United	End of Season	
24 January 2023	GK	(Iceland) Jökull Andrésson	(England) Reading	31 January 2023	

=== Loans out ===
Date	Pos	Player	Loaned to	On loan until	Ref
5 July 2022	FB	(England) Aamir Daniels	(England) Tavistock	End of Season	
5 July 2022	DF	(England) Joe O’Connor	(England) Tavistock	End of Season	
12 July 2022	GK	(England) Jack Arthur	(England) Larkhall Athletic	End of Season	
12 August 2022	CB	(England) Alfie Pond	(England) Yeovil Town	2 September 2022	(Note: On 2 September, Alfie Pond's loan at Yeovil was cut-short to materlise a permanent move to Wolverhampton Wanderers.)
13 August 2022	FW	(England) Nelson Iseguan	(England) Torquay United	1 January 2023	
16 August 2022	GK	(England) Harry Lee	(England) Dorchester Town	18 October 2022	(Note: On 16 September, Harry Lee's loan at Dorchester was extended until the end of the season.) (Note: On 18 October, Harry Lee was recalled back from his loan at Dorchester Town.)
1 September 2022	AM	(England) Josh Coley	(England) Harrogate Town	10 January 2023 (Note: On 10 January, Coley was recalled back from his loan at Harrogate.)	
28 September 2022	MF	(Portugal) Pedro Borges	(England) Plymouth Parkway	28 October 2022	
28 September 2022	DF	(England) Harrison King	(England) Plymouth Parkway	28 October 2022 (Note: Loan has been extended for an unspecified duration.)	
30 October 2022	MF	(Wales) Ed James	(England) Weymouth	1 January 2023	
26 December 2022	CF	(England) Sonny Cox	(England) Bath City	26 January 2023	
3 January 2023	MF	(England) Gabe Billington	(England) Poole Town	3 February 2023	
3 January 2023	MF	(Wales) Ed James	(England) Tiverton Town	3 February 2023	
28 January 2023	CF	(England) Sonny Cox	(England) Bath City	7 April 2023 (Note: On 7 April 2023, Sonny Cox and Pedro Borges were recalled from their loans at Bath City and Tiverton Town respectively.)	
3 February 2023	GK	(England) Harry Lee	(England) Plymouth Parkway	15 March 2023 (Note: Originally a loan until the end of the season, Harry Lee was recalled from Plymouth Parkway on the 15 March due to a long-term hamstring injury to Gary Woods.)	
5 February 2023	LW	(England) Nelson Iseguan	(England) Tiverton Town	24 March 2023	
7 March 2023	AM	(Portugal) Pedro Borges	(England) Tiverton Town	7 April 2023	

== Pre-season and friendlies ==
Southern League side Tiverton Town announced a pre-season friendly with Exeter City on 11 May 2022. Two days later, the club revealed a friendly away to Taunton Town; also of the Southern League. A behind closed doors friendly at the club's training ground against Truro City was also confirmed. On 24 May, the club confirmed a friendly fixture against Yeovil Town. A day later, Torquay United away was added to the schedule. A sixth friendly against Weston-super-Mare was also confirmed. A seventh pre-season fixture, against Bristol City was also added to the schedule.

Win Draw Loss Fixtures

1 July 2022 Friendly	Tiverton Town	2–1	Exeter City	Tiverton
19:00 BST	Purrington 53'; O'Loughlin 56'	Report	Brown 90+1'	Stadium: Ian Moorcroft Stadium

5 July 2022 Friendly	Weston-super-Mare	0–5	Exeter City	Weston-super-Mare
19:45 BST		Report	Nombe 52', 77', 79', 88'; Pond 68'	Stadium: Optima Stadium

8 July 2022 Friendly	Taunton Town	1–2	Exeter City	Taunton
19:45 BST	Warwick 80'	Report	Dieng 76', 87'	Stadium: Cygnet Health Care Stadium; Attendance: 901; Referee: Carl Peters

12 July 2022 Friendly	Exeter City	3–0	Truro City	Clyst St Mary
18:30 BST	Nombe 24'; Key 29'; Chauke 80'	Report		Stadium: Cliff Hill Training Ground; Attendance: 0 (behind-closed-doors)

16 July 2022 Friendly	Yeovil Town	1–1	Exeter City	Yeovil
15:00 BST	Knowles 19'	Report	Jay 33'	Stadium: Huish Park

19 July 2022 Friendly	Bristol City	2–2	Exeter City	Failand
16:30 BST	Conway 77', 85'	Report	Coley 11'; Hartridge 51'	Stadium: Robins High Performance Centre

23 July 2022 Friendly	Torquay United	1–0	Exeter City	Torquay
15:00 BST	McGavin 80'	Report		Stadium: Plainmoor; Attendance: 2,634

== Competitions ==
=== Overall record ===
Competition	First match	Last match	Starting round	Final position	Record							
Competition	First match	Last match	Starting round	Final position	Pld	W	D	L	GF	GA	GD	Win %
League One	30 July 2022	7 May 2023	Matchday 1	14th place	46	15	11	20	64	68	−4	32.61
FA Cup	5 November 2022	26 November 2022	First round	Second round	2	1	0	1	4	6	−2	50.00
EFL Cup	9 August 2022	23 August 2022	First round	Second round	2	1	1	0	7	0	+7	50.00
EFL Trophy	30 August 2022	18 October 2022	Group stage	Group stage	3	1	0	2	4	7	−3	33.33
Total					53	18	12	23	79	81	−2	33.96

Last updated: 7 May 2023
Source: Soccerway

=== League One ===
==== League table ====
Pos	Team	Pld	W	D	L	GF	GA	GD	Pts
11	Lincoln City	46	14	20	12	47	47	0	62
12	Shrewsbury Town	46	17	8	21	52	61	−9	59
13	Fleetwood Town	46	14	16	16	53	51	+2	58
14	Exeter City	46	15	11	20	64	68	−4	56
15	Burton Albion	46	15	11	20	57	79	−22	56
16	Cheltenham Town	46	14	12	20	45	61	−16	54
17	Bristol Rovers	46	14	11	21	58	73	−15	53

Source: EFL Official Website
Rules for classification: 1) Points; 2) Goal difference; 3) Number of goals scored; 4) Head-to-head results; 5) Wins; 6) Away goals; 7) Penalty points (sec 9.5); 8) 12-point sending off offences

==== Results summary ====
Overall								Home						Away					
Pld	W	D	L	GF	GA	GD	Pts	W	D	L	GF	GA	GD	W	D	L	GF	GA	GD
46	15	11	20	64	68	−4	56	10	5	8	36	27	+9	5	6	12	28	41	−13

Last updated: 7 May 2023.
Source: Soccerway

==== Results by round ====
Round	1	2	3	4	5	6	7	8	9	10	11	12	13	14	15	16	17	18	19	20	21	22	23	24	25	26	27	28	29	30	31	32	33	34	35	36	37	38	39	40	41	42	43	44	45	46
Ground	A	H	A	H	H	A	H	A	H	A	H	A	A	H	H	A	A	H	H	A	H	A	H	A	A	H	A	A	H	A	H	A	H	A	H	A	H	H	A	H	A	H	H	A	A	H
Result	D	W	L	W	L	D	W	L	L	W	D	W	L	L	W	D	L	W	L	D	D	L	D	W	W	D	L	W	L	L	D	L	W	D	W	L	W	W	D	L	L	L	L	L	L	W
Position	13	2	11	5	9	9	7	9	15	10	11	8	8	10	8	7	10	9	11	11	13	13	13	11	10	10	12	10	11	10	12	13	12	12	11	13	11	11	11	11	12	13	14	14	14	14

Updated to match(es) played on 7 May 2023. Source: Soccerway
A = Away; H = Home; W = Win; D = Draw; L = Loss; P = Postponed

==== Matches ====
Win Draw Loss Fixtures

On 23 June, the league fixtures were announced.

30 July 2022 1	Lincoln City	1–1	Exeter City	Lincoln
15:00 BST	Hopper 49'; Sørensen (yellow card) 90+2'	Report	Nombe 14'; Sweeney (yellow card) 32'; Dieng (yellow card) 58'	Stadium: LNER Stadium; Attendance: 8,162 (579 away); Referee: Andy Haines

6 August 2022 2	Exeter City	4–0	Port Vale	Exeter
15:00 BST	Kite 24'; Diabate (yellow card) 30'; Sweeney (yellow card) 35'; Brown 38' (pen.), 72'; Nombe 75'	Report		Stadium: St James Park; Attendance: 6,701; Referee: Charles Breakspear

13 August 2022 3	Cambridge United	2–1	Exeter City	Cambridge
15:00 BST	Digby (yellow card) 29', (goal) 88'; Dunk (yellow card) 44'; Smith 60'; Lankester (yellow card) 90+6'	Report	Brown 39'; Sweeney (yellow card) 45+1'; Coley (yellow card) 86'	Stadium: The Abbey Stadium; Attendance: 5,005 (464 away); Referee: Sam Purkiss

16 August 2022 4	Exeter City	3–1	Wycombe Wanderers	Exeter
19:45 BST	Kite 22'; Collins 38'; Dieng 74'	Report	McCleary (yellow card) 45+1'; Wheeler 50'; Scowen (yellow card) 59'; Forino (yellow card) 73'	Stadium: St James Park; Attendance: 6,832; Referee: John Busby

20 August 2022 5	Exeter City	0–1	Cheltenham Town	Exeter
15:00 BST		Report	N'Lundulu 56'; Long (yellow card) 77'; Southwood (yellow card) 79'; Williams (yellow card) 80'; Freestone (yellow card) 90+3'	Stadium: St James Park; Attendance: 5,927; Referee: Robert Lewis

27 August 2022 6	Accrington Stanley	0–0	Exeter City	Accrington
15:00 BST	Pritchard (yellow card) 81'	Report	Stubbs (yellow card) 56'	Stadium: Wham Stadium; Attendance: 2,170 (306 away); Referee: Seb Stockbridge

3 September 2022 7	Exeter City	1–0	Milton Keynes Dons	Exeter
15:00 BST	Diabate 66'; Grounds (yellow card) 83'	Report	Harvie (yellow card) 70'	Stadium: St James Park; Attendance: 5,931; Referee: Ben Toner

10 September 2022	Charlton Athletic	Postponed	Exeter City	Charlton
15:00 BST				Stadium: The Valley
Note: Fixture was postponed as a mark of respect following the passing of Queen Elizabeth II.

13 September 2022 8	Shrewsbury Town	3–2	Exeter City	Shrewsbury
19:45 BST	Pennington 21'; Bayliss 34'; Dunkley 90+3'	Report	Sweeney 17'; Grounds 20', (yellow card) 39'	Stadium: Montgomery Waters Meadow; Attendance: 4,803 (322 away); Referee: Martin Woods

17 September 2022 9	Exeter City	0–2	Burton Albion	Exeter
15:00 BST	Harper (yellow card) 68'; Key (yellow card) 90+2'	Report	Borthwick-Jackson (yellow card) 18'; Hughes (yellow card) 33'; Oshilaja 63', (yellow card) 84'; Keillor-Dunn 69'; Butcher (yellow card) 87'	Stadium: St James Park; Attendance: 6,185; Referee: Neil Hair

24 September 2022 10	Forest Green Rovers	0–4	Exeter City	Nailsworth
12:30 BST	Stevenson (yellow card) 25'; March (yellow card) 67'; Fiabema (yellow card) 80'	Report	Nombe 6'; Brown 26' (pen.), 41', 83' (pen.); Stansfield (yellow card) 75'	Stadium: The innocent New Lawn Stadium; Attendance: 2,623 (683 away); Referee: Ben Speedie
Note: This fixture was selected for broadcast live on Sky Sports

1 October 2022 11	Exeter City	2–2	Bristol Rovers	Exeter
15:00 BST	Key (yellow card) 37'; Brown 72' (pen.); Sweeney (yellow card) 77'; Nombe 81'	Report	Evans (yellow card) 15'; Finley (yellow card) 33'; Marquis 62'; Loft 90+2'	Stadium: St James Park; Attendance: 7,816; Referee: Declan Bourne
Note: Matt Taylor’s final fixture as manager of the Grecians

8 October 2022 12	Barnsley	0–2	Exeter City	Barnsley
15:00 BST		Report	Stansfield 1' 48'; Brown (yellow card) 89'	Stadium: Oakwell Stadium; Attendance: 10,384 (475 away); Referee: Martin Coy

11 October 2022 13	Charlton Athletic	4–2	Exeter City	Charlton
19:45 BST	Leaburn 20'; Hartridge 24' (o.g.); Aneke 84'; Payne 90+1'; O'Connell (yellow card) 90+5'	Report	Stansfield 37'; Nombe 90+5' (pen.)	Stadium: The Valley; Attendance: 11,411 (833 away); Referee: Craig Hicks

15 October 2022 14	Exeter City	2–4	Oxford United	Exeter
15:00 BST	Collins (yellow card) 11'; Sweeney (yellow card) 30'; Brown 65'; Stansfield (yellow card) 69'; Cox 90+2'	Report	Brannagan 12' (yellow card) 21'; Long 31'; Joseph 44', 54'	Stadium: St James Park; Attendance: 6,926; Referee: Thomas Kirk

22 October 2022 15	Exeter City	2–1	Fleetwood Town	Exeter
15:00 BST	Stansfield 30'; Nombe 90+3'	Report	Mendes Gomes 28'; Hayes (yellow card) 90+1'	Stadium: St James Park; Attendance: 5,834; Referee: Tom Nield

25 October 2022 16	Derby County	0–0	Exeter City	Derby
19:45 BST	Smith (yellow card) 17'; Sibley (yellow card) 37'	Report	Collins (yellow card) 38'; Caprice (yellow card) 70'; Jay (yellow card) 77'	Stadium: Pride Park Stadium; Attendance: 24,460 (1,197 away); Referee: Adam Herczeg
Note: Gary Caldwell’s first fixture as manager of the Grecians

31 October 2022 17	Plymouth Argyle	4–2	Exeter City	Plymouth
20:00 GMT	Whittaker 27'; Mumba 58'; Hardie 70', 84'	Report	Collins 25'; Nombe 52'	Stadium: Home Park; Attendance: 16,567 (1,617 away); Referee: Charles Breakspear
Note: This fixture was selected for broadcast live on Sky Sports

12 November 2022 18	Exeter City	3–2	Peterborough United	Exeter
15:00 GMT	Dieng 27' (yellow card) 55'; Sparkes (yellow card) 65'; Nombe 86'; Brown 90+1' (yellow card) 90+2'	Report	Clarke-Harris 40'; Mason-Clark 81'	Stadium: St James Park; Attendance: 6,489; Referee: Tom Reeves

19 November 2022 19	Exeter City	0–2	Ipswich Town	Exeter
12:00 GMT	Sparkes (yellow card) 45+1'	Report	Ladapo 11'; Harness 68' (yellow card) 86'; Burns (yellow card) 90'	Stadium: St James Park; Attendance: 7,232; Referee: Alan Young
Note: This fixture was selected for broadcast live on Sky Sports

2 December 2022 20	Morecambe	1–1	Exeter City	Morecambe
19:45 GMT	O'Connor (yellow card) 25'; Stockton 34'; Gibson (yellow card) 68'	Report	Key 36'	Stadium: Mazuma Stadium; Attendance: 3,976 (255 away); Referee: Peter Wright

10 December 2022 21	Exeter City	1–1	Sheffield Wednesday	Exeter
15:00 GMT	Key (yellow card) 43'; Caprice 56'; Brown (yellow card) 69'; Stansfield (yellow card) 71'; Dieng (yellow card) 76'	Report	McGuinness (yellow card) 73'; Paterson 90+4'	Stadium: St James Park; Attendance: 7,591; Referee: Neil Hair

17 December 2022 22	Bolton Wanderers	2–0	Exeter City	Bolton
15:00 GMT	Bradley 8'; Charles 26'	Report	Sparkes (yellow card) 90+3'	Stadium: University of Bolton Stadium; Attendance: 19,942 (874 away); Referee: Scott Oldham

26 December 2022 23	Exeter City	0–0	Portsmouth	Exeter
15:00 GMT	Stansfield (yellow card) 31'; Sparkes (yellow card) 79'; Collins (yellow card) 90+2'	Report	Dale (yellow card) 40'; Morrison (yellow card) 58'; Morrell (yellow card) 84'	Stadium: St James Park; Attendance: 7,779; Referee: Robert Lewis

29 December 2022 24	Bristol Rovers	3–4	Exeter City	Bristol
19:45 GMT	Collins (yellow card) 25', (goal) 57'; Coburn 64'; Sinclair 74' (pen.)	Report	Nombe 13', 90+2', (yellow card) 90+2'; Diabate (yellow card) 40'; Caprice (yellow card) 45'; Collins 45+2', (yellow card) 72'; Brown (yellow card) 59'; Sparkes (yellow card) 68'; Dieng 85'	Stadium: Memorial Stadium; Attendance: 9,735 (1,167 away); Referee: Simon Mather

1 January 2023 25	Oxford United	0–1	Exeter City	Littlemore
15:00 GMT	Brown (yellow card) 75'	Report	Nombe 79'; Sparkes (yellow card) 84'; Stansfield (yellow card) 90+1'; Collins (yellow card) 90+2'; Blackman (yellow card) 90+5'	Stadium: The Kassam Stadium; Attendance: 8,604 (619 away); Referee: Darren Drysdale

14 January 2023 26	Exeter City	1–1	Forest Green Rovers	Exeter
15:00 GMT	Nombe (yellow card) 51'; Brown 75'; White (yellow card) 87'	Report	Garrick 54'; Stevenson (yellow card) 79'	Stadium: St James Park; Attendance: 7,008; Referee: David Rock

21 January 2023 27	Portsmouth	2–0	Exeter City	Portsmouth
15:00 GMT	Pack 57'; Morrell 74'; Thompson (yellow card) 84'	Report	Hartridge (yellow card) 70'; White (yellow card) 85'	Stadium: Fratton Park; Attendance: 18,719 (1,589 away); Referee: Ollie Yates

24 January 2023	Exeter City	Postponed	Barnsley	Exeter
19:45 GMT				Stadium: St James Park
Note: Fixture was postponed due to a frozen pitch.

28 January 2023 28	Milton Keynes Dons	0–2	Exeter City	Milton Keynes
15:00 GMT	Devoy (yellow card) 36'; Harvie (yellow card) 63'; Kaikai (yellow card) 78'; Watson (yellow card) 81'	Report	Brown (yellow card) 22', (goal) 37' (pen.), 67'	Stadium: Stadium MK; Attendance: 6,719 (614 away); Referee: Andy Haines

4 February 2023 29	Exeter City	1–2	Charlton Athletic	Exeter
15:00 GMT	Mitchell 31'; Stansfield (yellow card) 45+3'; Kite (yellow card) 73'	Report	Rak-Sakyi 8', (yellow card) 9'; Blackett-Taylor 18'; Ness (yellow card) 32'	Stadium: St James Park; Attendance: 7,685; Referee: Declan Bourne

11 February 2023 30	Burton Albion	1–0	Exeter City	Burton upon Trent
15:00 GMT	Winnall 84'; Kirk (yellow card) 86'	Report	Stansfield (yellow card) 40'	Stadium: Pirelli Stadium; Attendance: 3,105 (587 away); Referee: Carl Brook

14 February 2023 31	Exeter City	0–0	Shrewsbury Town	Exeter
19:45 GMT		Report	Bennett (yellow card) 90+2'	Stadium: St James Park; Attendance: 5,661; Referee: Ben Speedie

18 February 2023 32	Port Vale	1–0	Exeter City	Burslem
15:00 GMT	Forrester 60', (yellow card) 90+8'; Robinson (yellow card) 68'; Harrison (yellow card) 90'	Report	Hartridge (yellow card) 28'; Harper (yellow card) 48' (yellow-red card) 59'	Stadium: Vale Park; Attendance: 6,209 (324 away); Referee: Andrew Kitchen

25 February 2023 33	Exeter City	2–0	Cambridge United	Exeter
15:00 GMT	Collins 18'; McDonald 53'	Report		Stadium: St James Park; Attendance: 6,400; Referee: Robert Lewis

4 March 2023 34	Wycombe Wanderers	1–1	Exeter City	High Wycombe
15:00 GMT	Campbell 2'	Report	McDonald 68'; Hartridge (yellow card) 78'; Key (yellow card) 80'; Sweeney (yellow card) 83'	Stadium: Adams Park; Attendance: 7,699 (617 away); Referee: Tom Nield

11 March 2023 35	Exeter City	2–1	Lincoln City	Exeter
15:00 GMT	Nombe 33', 73'; Hartridge (yellow card) 50' (yellow-red card) 85'; Key (yellow card) 69'; Stansfield (yellow card) 72'; Blackman (yellow card) 88'	Report	O'Connor 19' (yellow card) 81'; House (yellow card) 88'	Stadium: St James Park; Attendance: 6,193; Referee: Sunny Singh Gill

18 March 2023 36	Cheltenham Town	3–1	Exeter City	Cheltenham
15:00 GMT	Keena 17'; Taylor (yellow card) 35', (goal) 74'; Bonds (yellow card) 41'; Southwood (yellow card) 61'; Ferry (yellow card) 65'; May 79'; Broom (yellow card) 90+3'	Report	Nombe (penalty missed) 12'; Key 69', (yellow card) 90+2'; Aimson (yellow card) 90+3'	Stadium: Completely-Suzuki Stadium; Attendance: 5,102 (1,330 away); Referee: Anthony Backhouse

25 March 2023 37	Exeter City	5–0	Accrington Stanley	Exeter
15:00 GMT	Mitchell 36'; McDonald (yellow card) 44'; Key 49'; Nombe 54'; Scott 75'; Stansfield 81'	Report	Adedoyin (yellow card) 44'	Stadium: St James Park; Attendance: 6,556; Referee: Oliver Langford

28 March 2023 38	Exeter City	3–1	Barnsley	Exeter
19:45 BST	Stansfield 26'; Kite 49', (yellow card) 90+3'; Nombe 89' (pen.); Blackman (yellow card) 90+2'; Sweeney (yellow card) 90+5'	Report	Thomas 37', (yellow card) 89'; Connell (yellow card) 56'	Stadium: St James Park; Attendance: 6,720; Referee: Darren Handley

1 April 2023 39	Fleetwood Town	2–2	Exeter City	Fleetwood
15:00 BST	Marriott 18', 35'; Holgate (yellow card) 73'	Report	McDonald 28'; Sweeney 90+1'	Stadium: Highbury Stadium; Attendance: 3,568 (375 away); Referee: Lewis Smith

7 April 2023 40	Exeter City	0–1	Bolton Wanderers	Exeter
15:00 BST		Report	Bradley 27'; Mbete (yellow card) 76'; Thomason (yellow card) 82'; Nlundulu (yellow card) 90+2'	Stadium: St James Park; Attendance: 7,530; Referee: Craig Hicks

10 April 2023 41	Peterborough United	3–1	Exeter City	Peterborough
15:00 BST	Hartridge 8' (o.g.); Mason-Clark 43'; Clarke-Harris 70'; Poku (yellow card) 85'	Report	Kite (yellow card) 5'; Harper 46', (yellow card) 90+1'	Stadium: Weston Homes Stadium; Attendance: 8,261 (479 away); Referee: Charles Breakspear

15 April 2023 42	Exeter City	0–1	Plymouth Argyle	Exeter
12:00 BST	Chauke (yellow card) 3'; Stansfield (yellow card) 79'	Report	Earley (yellow card) 24'; Scarr (yellow card) 56'; Butcher 70'; Edwards (yellow card) 88'	Stadium: St James Park; Attendance: 8,046; Referee: Darren Drysdale

18 April 2023 43	Exeter City	1–2	Derby County	Exeter
19:45 BST	Sparkes 78'	Report	McGoldrick 52', 76'; Roberts (yellow card) 66'	Stadium: St James Park; Attendance: 7,028; Referee: Andy Woolmer

22 April 2023 44	Sheffield Wednesday	2–1	Exeter City	Owlerton
15:00 BST	Gregory 59'; Paterson 74', (yellow card) 80'; Palmer (yellow card) 78'; Vaulks (yellow card) 90+2'	Report	Key 47'; Caprice (yellow card) 64'	Stadium: Hillsborough Stadium; Attendance: 26,046 (939 away); Referee: Declan Bourne & Andy Haines

29 April 2023 45	Ipswich Town	6–0	Exeter City	Ipswich
15:00 BST	Chaplin 8', 32'; Luongo 16'; Hirst 22'; Broadhead 28' (pen.); Burns 47'; Clarke (yellow card) 57'; Burgess (yellow card) 88'	Report	Mitchell (yellow card) 59'	Stadium: Portman Road; Attendance: 29,334 (919 away); Referee: Scott Oldham

7 May 2023 46	Exeter City	3–2	Morecambe	Exeter
12:00 BST	Stansfield 49', 57', 70'; Borges (yellow card) 72'; Sweeney (yellow card) 77'; Kite (yellow card) 83'; Caprice (yellow card) 90+5'	Report	Stockton 53', 90+14'; Weir (yellow card) 79'; Mayor (yellow card) 81'; Hunter (yellow card) 90+6'	Stadium: St James Park; Attendance: 7,386; Referee: Carl Brook

=== FA Cup ===
Exeter were drawn away to Port Vale in the first round and to the winners off Woking versus Oxford United in the second round.

Win Draw Loss Fixtures

5 November 2022 First round	Port Vale	2–3	Exeter City	Burslem
15:00 GMT	Politic 25'; Butterworth 87'	Report	Stansfield (yellow card) 8'; Brown 43', 66'; Caprice (yellow card) 83'; Collins 89'	Stadium: Vale Park; Attendance: 4,807 (205 away); Referee: Simon Mather

26 November 2022 Second round	Oxford United	4–1	Exeter City	Littlemore
15:00 GMT	Taylor 9', (yellow card) 75'; McGuane (yellow card) 52'; Bodin 79', 88'; Brannagan 85'	Report	Hartridge (yellow card) 22'; Sparkes (yellow card) 37'; Key (yellow card) 71'; Jay 89'	Stadium: The Kassam Stadium; Attendance: 3,599 (427 away); Referee: Will Finnie

=== EFL Cup ===
Win Draw Loss Fixtures

The Grecians were drawn away to Cheltenham Town in the first round, who they went on to beat 7–0 in a multi-club-record-breaking victory. Exeter City were then drawn away at League Two side Gillingham in the second round.

9 August 2022 First round	Cheltenham Town	0–7	Exeter City	Cheltenham
19:45 BST	Lloyd (yellow card) 38'; Horton (yellow card) 63'	Report	Nombe 23', 35'; Collins 26'; Jay 28'; Sparkes 45+1'; Kite 50'; Coley 84'	Stadium: Whaddon Road Ground; Attendance: 2,552 (322 away); Referee: Will Finnie

23 August 2022 Second round	Gillingham	0–0 (6–5 p)	Exeter City	Gillingham
19:45 BST	Ehmer (yellow card) 13'	Report	Sweeney (yellow card) 20'; Stubbs (yellow card) 81'	Stadium: MEMS Priestfield Stadium; Attendance: 2,127 (257 away); Referee: Carl Brook
	Penalties
	Lee (penalty scored); Mandron (penalty scored); Wright (penalty scored); Reeves (penalty scored); Adelakun (penalty scored); Tutonda (penalty scored)		Brown (penalty scored); Cox (penalty scored); Caprice (penalty scored); Collins (penalty scored); Coley (penalty scored); Key (penalty missed)

=== EFL Trophy ===
On 20 June, the initial Group stage draw was made, grouping Exeter City with Forest Green Rovers and Newport County. Three days later, Southampton U21s joined Southern Group F.

Pos	Div	Team	Pld	W	PW	PL	L	GF	GA	GD	Pts	Qualification
1	L1	Forest Green Rovers	3	3	0	0	0	9	3	+6	9	Advance to Round 2
2	L2	Newport County	3	2	0	0	1	5	4	+1	6	Advance to Round 2
3	L1	Exeter City	3	1	0	0	2	4	7	−3	3	
4	ACA	Southampton U21	3	0	0	0	3	3	7	−4	0	

Source: EFL.com

Win Draw Loss Fixtures

30 August 2022 Group stage	Exeter City	1–2	Newport County	Exeter
19:00 BST	Chauke 52'	Report	Zimba 57'; Wildig (yellow card) 66'; Bogle 82'; Farquharson (yellow card) 90'	Stadium: St James Park; Attendance: 1,902; Referee: Darren Drysdale

4 October 2022 Group stage	Exeter City	2–1	Southampton U21	Exeter
19:00 BST	Jay 40'; Chauke 45+3'; James (yellow card) 72'; Stansfield (yellow card) 78'; Key (yellow card) 85'	Report	Ballard 18'; Turner (yellow card) 45+2'	Stadium: St James Park; Attendance: 1,074; Referee: Sunny Singh Gill

18 October 2022 Group stage	Forest Green Rovers	4–1	Exeter City	Nailsworth
19:00 BST	Bunker (yellow card) 7'; Matt 12'; Peart-Harris 51' (pen.); Billington 54' (o.g.); O'Keeffe 63'; Hendry (yellow card) 69'	Report	Jay 41'; King (yellow card) 68'	Stadium: The innocent New Lawn Stadium; Attendance: 729; Referee: Sam Allison
