= 2023–24 Exeter City F.C. season =

122nd season in existence of Exeter City FC

Exeter City
2023–24 season
- Owner: Exeter City Supporters' Trust
- Chairman: Nick Hawker
- Manager: Gary Caldwell
- Stadium: St James Park
- League One: 13th
- FA Cup: First round
- EFL Cup: Fourth round
- EFL Trophy: Group stage
- Top goalscorer: League: Reece Cole (7); All: Reece Cole (7)
- Highest home attendance: 8,322 vs. Portsmouth, 29 December 2023
- Lowest home attendance: 1,871 vs. Reading, 19 September 2023
- Average home league attendance: 6,800
- Biggest win: 3–0 vs. Wycombe Wanderers, 13 August 2023; Shrewsbury Town, 12 March 2024
- Biggest defeat: All: 0–9 vs. Reading, 19 September 2023; League: 0–7 vs. Bolton Wanderers, 25 November 2023
Home colours	Away colours	Third colours

The 2023–24 season is the 122nd season in the history of Exeter City and their second consecutive season in League One. The club are participating in League One, the FA Cup, the EFL Cup, and the 2023–24 EFL Trophy.

== Current squad ==
As of 19 June 2024

Note: Flags indicate national team as has been defined under FIFA eligibility rules. Players may hold more than one non-FIFA nationality.

No.	Name	Position	Nationality	Place of birth	Date of birth (age)	Previous club	Date signed	Fee	Contract end
Goalkeepers
1	Viljami Sinisalo	GK	(Finland)	Espoo	11 October 2001 (age 25)	Aston Villa	19 July 2023	Loan	31 May 2024
22	Harry Lee	GK	(England)	Torbay	22 December 2004 (age 21)	Academy	1 July 2021	Trainee	30 June 2025
30	Shaun MacDonald	GK	(England)	Newcastle-upon-Tyne	20 October 1996 (age 30)	Cheltenham Town	9 September 2023	Free	30 June 2025
33	Gary Woods	GK	(England)	Kettering	1 October 1990 (age 36)	(Scotland) Kilmarnock	31 January 2023	Free	30 June 2024
Defenders
2	Ben Purrington	LB	(England)	Exeter	20 May 1996 (age 30)	(Scotland) Ross County	11 January 2024	Undisclosed	30 June 2025
3	Zak Jules	CB	(Scotland)	(England) Islington	7 February 1997 (age 29)	Milton Keynes Dons	28 July 2023	Undisclosed	30 June 2024
4	Will Aimson	CB	(England)	Christchurch	1 January 1994 (age 32)	Bolton Wanderers	27 January 2023	Undisclosed	30 June 2025
5	Alex Hartridge	CB	(England)	Torquay	9 March 1999 (age 27)	Academy	1 July 2017	Trainee	30 June 2024
7	Demetri Mitchell	LB	(England)	Manchester	11 January 1997 (age 29)	(Scotland) Hibernian	26 January 2023	Undisclosed	30 June 2025
14	Ilmari Niskanen	WB	(Finland)	Kiuruvesi	27 October 1997 (age 29)	(Scotland) Dundee United	15 August 2023	Undisclosed	30 June 2026
24	Jack Fitzwater	CB	(England)	Solihull	23 September 1997 (age 29)	(Scotland) Livingston	5 September 2023	Free	30 June 2025
26	Pierce Sweeney	CB	(Republic of Ireland)	Dublin	11 September 1994 (age 32)	Swindon Town	8 July 2021	Free	30 June 2026
31	Vincent Harper	LB	(Kenya)	Nairobi	22 September 2000 (age 26)	Eastleigh	21 June 2023	Undisclosed	30 June 2025
38	Max Edgecombe	CB	(England)			Academy	1 July 2023	Trainee	30 June 2024
39	Cheick Diabate	CB	(England)	London	21 January 2002 (age 24)	Stevenage	1 July 2019	Free	30 June 2025
40	Ed James	CB	(Wales)	(England) Exeter		Academy	1 July 2023	Trainee	30 June 2026
46	Liam Oakes	CB	(England)			Academy	19 September 2023	Trainee	30 June 2024
57	Aamir Daniels	RB	(Israel)	(England) London		Kinetic Foundation	8 March 2022	Free	30 June 2024
Midfielders
6	Tom Carroll	CM	(England)	Watford	28 May 1992 (age 34)	Ipswich Town	20 July 2023	Free	30 June 2024
8	Ryan Woods	DM	(England)	Norton Canes	13 December 1993 (age 32)	Hull City	1 February 2024	Loan	31 May 2024
12	Reece Cole	CM	(England)	Hillingdon	17 February 1998 (age 28)	Hayes & Yeading United	10 July 2023	Free	30 June 2025
16	Harry Kite	CM	(England)	Crediton	29 June 2000 (age 26)	Academy	7 February 2018	Trainee	30 June 2024
17	Caleb Watts	AM	(Australia)	(England) Essex	16 January 2002 (age 24)	Southampton	15 September 2023	Free	31 January 2025
18	David Perkins	CM	(England)	Heysham	21 June 1982 (age 44)	Bamber Bridge	10 November 2022	Free	30 June 2024
20	Luke Harris	AM	(Wales)	Jersey	4 March 2005 (age 21)	Fulham	3 January 2024	Loan	31 May 2024
23	Kyle Taylor	CM	(Switzerland)	Richterswil	28 August 1999 (age 27)	Bournemouth	31 August 2021	Undisclosed	30 June 2024
34	Gabriel Billington	CM	(England)	Taunton		Academy	1 July 2023	Trainee	30 June 2024
35	Joe O'Connor	CM	(England)	Plymouth	19 October 2004 (age 22)	Academy	1 July 2023	Trainee	30 June 2024
42	Tom Dean	CM	(England)			Academy	9 October 2023	Trainee	30 June 2024
47	Jake Richards	CM	(England)		8 August 2007 (age 19)	Academy	9 September 2023	Trainee	30 June 2024
48	Santino Ohanaka	AM	(England)			Academy	9 October 2023	Trainee	30 June 2024
51	Alfie Cunningham	CM	(Wales)		13 February 2006 (age 20)	Academy	19 September 2023	Trainee	30 June 2024
54	Sam Joce	CM	(England)			Academy	19 September 2023	Trainee	30 June 2024
Forwards
10	Admiral Muskwe	CF	(Zimbabwe)	(England) Leicester	21 August 1998 (age 28)	Luton Town	1 September 2023	Loan	31 May 2024
13	Yanic Wildschut	LW	(Suriname)	(Netherlands) Amsterdam	1 November 1991 (age 35)	Oxford United	15 September 2023	Free	30 June 2025
19	Sonny Cox	CF	(England)	Exeter	11 October 2004 (age 22)	Academy	1 July 2021	Trainee	30 June 2026
21	Dion Rankine	RW	(England)	Barnet	15 October 2002 (age 24)	Chelsea	12 July 2023	Loan	31 May 2024
25	Millenic Alli	LW	(Republic of Ireland)	Dublin	6 February 2000 (age 26)	FC Halifax Town	30 January 2024	Undisclosed	30 June 2026
27	Mohamed Eisa	CF	(Sudan)	Khartum	12 July 1994 (age 32)	Milton Keynes Dons	30 January 2024	Loan	31 May 2024
29	Jack Aitchison	FW	(Scotland)	Fauldhouse	5 March 2000 (age 26)	(Scotland) Motherwell	1 July 2023	Free	30 June 2026
44	Theo Cutler	FW	(England)			Academy	19 September 2023	Trainee	30 June 2024
Out on Loan
11	James Scott	CF	(Scotland)	Glasgow	30 August 2000 (age 26)	Hull City	31 January 2023	Free	30 June 2024
36	Mitch Beardmore	LM	(England)	Somerset	7 September 2004 (age 22)	Academy	1 July 2023	Trainee	30 June 2024
37	Harrison King	RM	(England)	Exeter	16 January 2005 (age 21)	Academy	1 July 2023	Trainee	30 June 2024
41	Pedro Borges	AM	(Portugal)		23 July 2005 (age 21)	Academy	1 July 2023	Trainee	30 June 2024
—N/a	Charlie Cummins	CM	(Republic of Ireland)			(Republic of Ireland) Cobh Ramblers	26 January 2024	Undisclosed	30 June 2026

=== Statistics ===
As of match played on 26 September 2023

No.	Pos	Nat	Player	Total		League One		FA Cup		EFL Cup		EFL Trophy	
No.	Pos	Nat	Player	Apps	Goals	Apps	Goals	Apps	Goals	Apps	Goals	Apps	Goals
1	GK	(Finland) FIN	Viljami Sinisalo	11	0	8+0	0	0+0	0	3+0	0	0+0	0
3	DF	(Scotland) SCO	Zak Jules	12	0	8+0	0	0+0	0	2+1	0	1+0	0
4	DF	(England) ENG	Will Aimson	12	2	9+0	2	0+0	0	3+0	0	0+0	0
5	DF	(England) ENG	Alex Hartridge	12	1	9+0	0	0+0	0	3+0	1	0+0	0
6	MF	(England) ENG	Tom Carroll	10	0	8+0	0	0+0	0	1+1	0	0+0	0
7	DF	(England) ENG	Demetri Mitchell	11	3	9+0	2	0+0	0	1+1	1	0+0	0
8	MF	(England) ENG	Ryan Trevitt	11	2	9+0	2	0+0	0	2+0	0	0+0	0
10	FW	(Zimbabwe) ZIM	Admiral Muskwe	1	0	0+1	0	0+0	0	0+0	0	0+0	0
11	FW	(Scotland) SCO	James Scott	8	2	1+4	1	0+0	0	2+0	1	1+0	0
12	MF	(England) ENG	Reece Cole	12	1	6+3	1	0+0	0	2+1	0	0+0	0
13	FW	(Suriname) SUR	Yanic Wildschut	3	0	2+0	0	0+0	0	0+1	0	0+0	0
14	DF	(Finland) FIN	Ilmari Niskanen	3	0	2+0	0	0+0	0	1+0	0	0+0	0
16	MF	(England) ENG	Harry Kite	2	0	1+0	0	0+0	0	0+1	0	0+0	0
17	MF	(Australia) AUS	Caleb Watts	4	1	0+2	1	0+0	0	1+0	0	1+0	0
19	FW	(England) ENG	Sonny Cox	10	0	2+4	0	0+0	0	1+2	0	1+0	0
21	FW	(England) ENG	Dion Rankine	8	0	6+0	0	0+0	0	1+1	0	0+0	0
23	MF	(England) ENG	Kyle Taylor	12	1	0+8	0	0+0	0	1+2	1	1+0	0
24	DF	(England) ENG	Jack Fitzwater	2	0	0+0	0	0+0	0	1+0	0	1+0	0
26	DF	(Republic of Ireland) IRL	Pierce Sweeney	12	0	9+0	0	0+0	0	2+1	0	0+0	0
29	FW	(Scotland) SCO	Jack Aitchison	6	1	5+0	1	0+0	0	1+0	0	0+0	0
30	GK	(England) ENG	Shaun MacDonald	0	0	0+0	0	0+0	0	0+0	0	0+0	0
31	DF	(Kenya) KEN	Vincent Harper	10	0	0+7	0	0+0	0	3+0	0	0+0	0
33	GK	(England) ENG	Gary Woods	2	0	1+0	0	0+0	0	0+0	0	1+0	0
34	MF	(England) ENG	Gabriel Billington	0	0	0+0	0	0+0	0	0+0	0	0+0	0
35	MF	(England) ENG	Joe O'Connor	1	0	0+0	0	0+0	0	0+0	0	1+0	0
36	FW	(England) ENG	Mitch Beardmore	3	0	0+1	0	0+0	0	0+1	0	1+0	0
38	DF	(England) ENG	Max Edgecombe	1	0	0+0	0	0+0	0	0+0	0	0+1	0
39	DF	(England) ENG	Cheick Diabate	3	0	0+2	0	0+0	0	1+0	0	0+0	0
41	MF	(Portugal) POR	Pedro Borges	4	0	0+2	0	0+0	0	0+1	0	1+0	0
47	MF	(England) ENG	Jake Richards	3	0	1+0	0	0+0	0	0+1	0	1+0	0
Players with appearances who left Exeter City during the season:
	FW	(England) ENG	Sam Nombe	6	0	3+2	0	0+0	0	1+0	0	0+0	0

== Transfers ==
=== In ===
Date	Pos	Player	Transferred from	Fee	Ref
21 June 2023	LB	Vincent Harper (ENG)	Eastleigh (ENG)	Undisclosed	
1 July 2023	CF	Jack Aitchison (SCO)	Motherwell (SCO)	Free transfer	
10 July 2023	CM	Reece Cole (ENG)	Hayes & Yeading United (ENG)	Free transfer	
20 July 2023	CM	Tom Carroll (ENG)	Free agent	—N/a	
28 July 2023	CB	Zak Jules (SCO)	Milton Keynes Dons (ENG)	Undisclosed	
15 August 2023	RWB	Ilmari Niskanen (FIN)	Dundee United (SCO)	Undisclosed	
5 September 2023	CB	Jack Fitzwater (ENG)	Livingston (SCO)	Free transfer	
9 September 2023	GK	Shaun MacDonald (ENG)	Free agent	—N/a	
15 September 2023	AM	Caleb Watts (AUS)	Southampton (ENG)	Free transfer	
15 September 2023	LW	Yanic Wildschut (SUR)	Oxford United (ENG)	Free transfer	
11 January 2024	LB	Ben Purrington (ENG)	Ross County (SCO)	Undisclosed	
26 January 2024	CM	Charlie Cummins (IRE)	Cobh Ramblers (IRE)	Undisclosed	
30 January 2024	LW	Millenic Alli (IRL)	FC Halifax Town (ENG)	Undisclosed	

=== Out ===
Date	Pos	Player	Transferred to	Fee	Ref
28 June 2023	CM	Archie Collins (ENG)	Peterborough United (ENG)	Compensation Fee	
30 June 2023	GK	Jamal Blackman (ENG)	Burton Albion (ENG)	Released	
30 June 2023	SS	Jevani Brown (JAM)	Bristol Rovers (ENG)	Released	
30 June 2023	AM	Josh Coley (ENG)	Sutton United (ENG)	Undisclosed	
30 June 2023	CB	Jonathan Grounds (ENG)	Free agent	Rejected Contract	
30 June 2023	DM	Kevin McDonald (SCO)	Bradford City (ENG)	Rejected Contract	
30 June 2023	LB	Jack Sparkes (ENG)	Portsmouth (ENG)	Released	
4 July 2023	RB	Josh Key (ENG)	Swansea City (WAL)	Compensation Fee	
19 July 2023	RB	Jake Caprice (ENG)	Burton Albion (ENG)	Free transfer	
31 August 2023	CF	Sam Nombe (ENG)	Rotherham United (ENG)	Undisclosed	

=== Loaned in ===
Date	Pos	Player	Loaned from	Until	Ref
12 July 2023	RW	Dion Rankine (ENG)	Chelsea (ENG)	End of season	
14 July 2023	CM	Ryan Trevitt (ENG)	Brentford (ENG)	8 January 2024 (Note: On 8 January, Trevitt was recalled early to Brentford from his season-long loan.)	
19 July 2023	GK	Viljami Sinisalo (FIN)	Aston Villa (ENG)	End of season	
1 September 2023	CF	Admiral Muskwe (ZIM)	Luton Town (ENG)	End of season	
3 January 2024	AM	Luke Harris (WAL)	Fulham (ENG)	End of season	
30 January 2024	CF	Mohamed Eisa (SUD)	Milton Keynes Dons (ENG)	End of season	
1 February 2024	DM	Ryan Woods (ENG)	Hull City (ENG)	End of season	

=== Loaned out ===
Date	Pos	Player	Loaned to	Until	Ref
15 July 2023	CB	Ed James (WAL)	Weston-super-Mare (ENG)	10 October 2023 (Note: On 10 October, James was recalled from his half-season loan at Weston-super-Mare.)	
15 July 2023	GK	Harry Lee (ENG)	Weston-super-Mare (ENG)	1 December 2023 (Note: On 1 December, Lee was recalled from his loan at Weston-super-Mare.)	
10 August 2023	RB	Harrison King (ENG)	Plymouth Parkway (ENG)	9 September 2023	
27 September 2023	CM	Joe O'Connor (ENG)	Tavistock (ENG)	25 October 2023	
17 October 2023	AM	Mitch Beardmore (ENG)	Tavistock (ENG)	14 November 2023	
17 October 2023	CF	Sonny Cox (ENG)	Yeovil Town (ENG)	14 December 2023 (Note: On 14 December, Cox was recalled two-weeks early from his loan at Yeovil.)	
18 October 2023	AM	Pedro Borges (POR)	Dorchester Town (ENG)	31 December 2023 (Note: On 31 December, Borges was recalled early from his loan at Dorchester.)	
18 October 2023	CB	Ed James (WAL)	Dorchester Town (ENG)	10 January 2024	
18 December 2023	CF	Theo Cutler (ENG)	Tiverton Town (ENG)	15 January 2024	
21 December 2023	CM	Alfie Cunningham (WAL)	Tavistock (ENG)	17 January 2024	
21 December 2023	CM	Tom Dean (ENG)	Tavistock (ENG)	17 January 2024	
21 December 2023	CM	Sam Joce (ENG)	Tavistock (ENG)	17 January 2024	
24 January 2024	CF	James Scott (SCO)	St Mirren (SCO)	End of season	
26 January 2024	LM	Mitch Beardmore (ENG)	Mousehole (ENG)	End of season	
26 January 2024	RM	Harrison King (ENG)	Plymouth Parkway (ENG)	End of season	
3 February 2024	CM	Pedro Borges (POR)	Gosport Borough (ENG)	End of season	
3 February 2024	GK	Harry Lee (ENG)	Salisbury (ENG)	19 March 2024 (Note: On 19 March, Lee returned from his loan at Salisbury due to a broken arm injury.)	
8 March 2024	CM	Charlie Cummins (IRL)	Mousehole (ENG)	End of season	

== Pre-season and friendlies ==
On May 15, Exeter City announced their first pre-season friendly, against Tiverton Town. Two days later, a trip to Taunton Town was added. A third and fourth friendly tie was confirmed the next day against Mousehole and Torquay United respectively. On 18 May, Further friendlies against Bristol City, Bath City and Weston-super-Mare were also announced. In June, a further match was added to the schedule, against Coventry City.

Win Draw Loss Fixtures

7 July 2023 Friendly	Tiverton Town	0–1	Exeter City	Tiverton
19:00 BST		Report	Dacosta 39'	Stadium: Ian Moorcroft Stadium; Attendance: 1,611

11 July 2023 Friendly	Mousehole	0–8	Exeter City	Paul
19:30 BST		Report	Harper 6', 43'; Nombe 23'; Aitchison 29'; Beardmore 44'; Cox 50'; Cole 85'; Borges 89'	Stadium: Trungle Parc; Attendance: 617

15 July 2023 Friendly	Bath City	0–0	Exeter City	Twerton
15:00 BST		Report		Stadium: Twerton Park; Attendance: 708

18 July 2023 Friendly	Taunton Town	0–3	Exeter City	Taunton
19:45 BST		Report	Mitchell 8'; Nombe 47'; Trevitt 57'	Stadium: The Cygnet Health Care Stadium

22 July 2023 Friendly	Torquay United	4–1	Exeter City	Torquay
15:00 BST	Collins 3'; Ash 16'; Stobbs 50'; Hall 90+1' (pen.)	Report	Sweeney (red card) 17'; Trevitt 90+7' (pen.)	Stadium: Plainmoor; Attendance: 3,014 (1,110 away); Referee: Paul Johnson

25 July 2023 Friendly	Bristol City	4–0	Exeter City	Bristol
13:00 BST	Leeson 30', 80'; Wells 59'; Sykes 76'	Report		Stadium: Robins High Performance Centre

25 July 2023 Friendly	Weston-super-Mare	2–3	Exeter City	Weston-super-Mare
19:30 BST	O'Connor 26' (o.g.); Dodd 59'	Report	Nombe 24' (pen.); O'Connor 29'; Tom Dean 84'	Stadium: The Optima Stadium

29 July 2023 Friendly	Exeter City	1–2	Coventry City	Exeter
15:00 BST	Harper 81'	Report	Godden 67'; Sheaf 90+3'	Stadium: St James Park; Attendance: 5,147; Referee: Lee Swabey

== Competitions ==
=== Overall record ===
Competition	Starting round	Final position	Record							
Competition	Starting round	Final position	Pld	W	D	L	GF	GA	GD	Win %
League One	Matchday 1	13th place	46	17	10	19	46	61	−15	36.96
FA Cup	First round	First round	1	0	0	1	0	2	−2	0.00
EFL Cup	First round	Fourth round	4	2	1	1	6	5	+1	50.00
EFL Trophy	Group stage	Group stage	3	1	0	2	1	14	−13	33.33
Total			54	20	11	23	53	82	−29	37.04

Last updated: 27 April 2024
Source: Soccerway

=== League One ===
==== League table ====
Pos	Team	Pld	W	D	L	GF	GA	GD	Pts
10	Wycombe Wanderers	46	17	14	15	60	55	+5	65
11	Leyton Orient	46	18	11	17	53	55	−2	65
12	Wigan Athletic	46	20	10	16	63	56	+7	62 (Note: On 19 May 2023, Wigan Athletic were deducted four points for failing to pay players and staff on time following previous EFL rules breaches in the 2022–23 season. Another four-point deduction was applied on 26 May, after the club's owners missed a deadline to deposit an amount equalling 125% of its monthly wage bill.)
13	Exeter City	46	17	10	19	46	61	−15	61
14	Northampton Town	46	17	9	20	57	66	−9	60
15	Bristol Rovers	46	16	9	21	52	68	−16	57
16	Charlton Athletic	46	11	20	15	64	65	−1	53

Source: EFL Official Website
Rules for classification: 1) Points; 2) Goal difference; 3) Number of goals scored; 4) Head-to-head results; 5) Wins; 6) Away goals; 7) Penalty points (sec 9.5); 8) 12-point sending off offences

==== Results summary ====
Overall								Home						Away					
Pld	W	D	L	GF	GA	GD	Pts	W	D	L	GF	GA	GD	W	D	L	GF	GA	GD
46	17	10	19	46	61	−15	61	7	8	8	17	22	−5	10	2	11	29	39	−10

Last updated: 27 April 2024.
Source: Soccerway

==== Results by round ====
Round	1	2	3	4	5	6	7	8	9	10	11	12	14	15	16	17	19	20	21	22	23	24	25	26	27	28	29	13^{1}	30	31	18^{2}	32	33	34	35	36	37	38	39	41	42	43	40^{3}	44	45	46
Ground	A	H	A	A	H	A	H	H	A	H	A	H	H	A	H	A	A	H	H	A	A	H	H	A	H	A	H	A	A	H	H	A	H	A	H	A	H	A	H	H	A	H	A	A	A	H
Result	W	D	L	W	W	W	L	W	L	L	L	L	L	L	D	L	L	D	L	D	L	W	D	L	W	L	D	W	W	L	W	W	L	L	D	L	D	W	W	D	W	W	D	W	W	L
Position	2	7	11	7	2	1	3	1	6	8	10	11	16	18	17	20	20	20	20	20	20	20	20	21	20	20	20	19	14	16	14	13	14	14	14	16	16	16	15	15	15	12	12	12	12	13
Points	3	4	4	7	10	13	13	16	16	16	16	16	16	16	17	17	17	18	18	19	19	22	23	23	26	26	27	30	33	33	36	39	39	39	40	40	41	44	47	48	51	54	55	58	61	61

Updated to match(es) played on 27 April 2024. Source: Soccerway
A = Away; H = Home; W = Win; D = Draw; L = Loss; P = Postponed
Notes:
- ^{1} Matchday 13 (vs Bristol Rovers) was postponed due to the international call-ups.
- ^{2} Matchday 18 (vs Peterborough United) was postponed due to the international call-ups.
^{3} Matchday 40 (vs Leyton Orient) was postponed due to the international call-ups.

==== Matches ====
On 22 June, the EFL League One fixtures were released.

Win Draw Loss Fixtures

5 August 2023 1	Wycombe Wanderers	0–3	Exeter City	High Wycombe
15:00 BST	Boyes (yellow card) 18'; Vincent-Young (yellow card) 33'	Report	Aitchison 1'; Aimson 4', (yellow card) 11'; Nombe (penalty missed) 9'; Sweeney (yellow card) 58'; Scott 83'	Stadium: Adams Park; Attendance: 5,369 (766 away); Referee: Charles Breakspear

12 August 2023 2	Exeter City	0–0	Blackpool	Exeter
15:00 BST	Carroll (yellow card) 14'; Scott (yellow card) 82'	Report	Hamilton (yellow card) 51'	Stadium: St James Park; Attendance: 7,340; Referee: Sam Purkiss

15 August 2023 3	Portsmouth	1–0	Exeter City	Portsmouth
20:00 BST	Poole (yellow card) 50'; Bishop 70'; Sparkes (yellow card) 74'; Robertson (yellow card) 79'; Ogilvie (yellow card) 89'; Shaughnessy (yellow card) 90'	Report	Hartridge (yellow card) 44'	Stadium: Fratton Park; Attendance: 17,592 (530 away); Referee: Tom Reeves
Note: This fixture was selected for live broadcast on Sky Sports

19 August 2023 4	Carlisle United	0–2	Exeter City	Carlisle
15:00 BST		Report	Mitchell (yellow card) 25', (goal) 81'; Trevitt 68'	Stadium: Brunton Park; Attendance: 7,610 (318 away); Referee: Adam Herczeg

26 August 2023 5	Exeter City	2–1	Reading	Exeter
15:00 BST	Sweeney (yellow card) 17'; Aimson 34'; Jules (yellow card) 44'; Cole (yellow card) (goal) 90+3'	Report	Azeez (yellow card) 24'; Mbengue (yellow card) 37'; Knibbs 45+3'; Carson (yellow card) 56'; Abbey (yellow card) 89'	Stadium: St James Park; Attendance: 7,956; Referee: Will Finnie

2 September 2023 6	Burton Albion	0–1	Exeter City	Burton upon Trent
15:00 BST	Powell (yellow card) 26'; Moon (yellow card) 59'; Seddon (yellow card) 81' (yellow-red card) 90+4'	Report	Cole (yellow card) 45+3'; Trevitt 75'	Stadium: Pirelli Stadium; Attendance: 2,613 (682 away); Referee: Geoff Eltringham

9 September 2023 7	Exeter City	1–2	Leyton Orient	Exeter
15:00 BST	Mitchell 48'; Borges (yellow card) 90'; Beardmore (yellow card) 90+5'; Cole (yellow card) 90+6'	Report	Archibald (yellow card) 45+2'; Pigott 55'; Pratley (yellow card) 59'; Sotiriou 90+2' (yellow card) 90+3'	Stadium: St James Park; Attendance: 7,004; Referee: Ben Toner

16 September 2023 8	Exeter City	1–0	Cheltenham Town	Exeter
15:00 BST	Wildschut (yellow card) 38'; Watts 68'; Scott (yellow card) 75'; Carroll (yellow card) 87'	Report	B. Williams (yellow card) 18'; J. Williams (yellow card) 61'	Stadium: St James Park; Attendance: 6,312; Referee: Martin Woods

23 September 2023 9	Oxford United	3–0	Exeter City	Littlemore
15:00 BST	Rodrigues 8'; Long (yellow card) 72'; Brannagan 83' (pen.), 90+4' (pen.)	Report	Aimson (yellow card) 82'	Stadium: The Kassam Stadium; Attendance: 10,022 (909 away); Referee: Daniel Middleton

30 September 2023 10	Exeter City	0–2	Northampton Town	Exeter
15:00 BST	Jules (yellow card) 8'	Report	Hoskins 20'; Bowie (yellow card) 35'; Brough (yellow card) 41' (goal) 90+2'; Sherring (yellow card) 44'; Odimayo (yellow card) 62'; Monthé (yellow card) 84'	Stadium: St James Park; Attendance: 6,541; Referee: Neil Hair

3 October 2023 11	Charlton Athletic	4–1	Exeter City	Charlton
19:45 BST	Blackett-Taylor 45'; Tedić (yellow card) 45+3'; Aneke (penalty missed) 65'; May 65', 86'; Leaburn 79'	Report	Scott 23'; Aimson (red card) 66'	Stadium: The Valley; Attendance: 11,575 (741 away); Referee: David Rock

7 October 2023 12	Exeter City	0–1	Barnsley	Exeter
15:00 BST	Aitchison (yellow card) 45'; Cole (yellow card) 70'	Report	McCart (yellow card) 6'; Styles (yellow card) 45+1'; McAtee 89'	Stadium: St James Park; Attendance: 6,542; Referee: Scott Jackson

21 October 2023 14	Exeter City	0–2	Wigan Athletic	Exeter
15:00 BST	Harper (yellow card) 32'; Jules (yellow card) 45+2'; Watts (yellow card) 82'; Cole (yellow card) 90+8'	Report	Godo 8', (yellow card) 56'; Pearce (yellow card) 26'; Smith (yellow card) 90+4'; Aimson 90+7' (o.g.)	Stadium: St James Park; Attendance: 6,337; Referee: Ben Atkinson

24 October 2023 15	Derby County	2–0	Exeter City	Derby
19:45 BST	Mendez-Laing 30'; Hourihane (yellow card) 34'; Sibley (yellow card) 55'; Washington 79'	Report	Watts (yellow card) 62'	Stadium: Pride Park Stadium; Attendance: 24,040 (637 away); Referee: Sunny Singh Gill

28 October 2023 16	Exeter City	1–1	Lincoln City	Exeter
15:00 BST	Scott (yellow card) 53'; Hartridge (yellow card) 77'; Harper (yellow card) 78'; Trevitt 81'; Sinisalo (yellow card) 89'	Report	Smith 20'; Hamilton (yellow card) 39'; Adelakun (yellow card) 43'; Erhahon (yellow card) 78'; O'Connor (yellow card) 89'	Stadium: St James Park; Attendance: 5,612; Referee: Jeremy Simpson

11 November 2023 17	Fleetwood Town	3–0	Exeter City	Fleetwood
15:00 GMT	Broom 6' (yellow card) 73'; Sarpong-Wiredu 32'; Patterson 42'; Omochere (yellow card) 66'	Report	Wildschut (yellow card) 65'; Diabate (yellow card) 75'	Stadium: Highbury Stadium; Attendance: 2,688 (256 away); Referee: Thomas Kirk

25 November 2023 19	Bolton Wanderers	7–0	Exeter City	Bolton
15:00 GMT	Iredale 34'; Adeboyejo 43'; Maghoma 55'; Charles 63', 74'; Dempsey 87'; Nlundulu 90+2'	Report	Jules (yellow card) 18'	Stadium: Toughsheet Community Stadium; Attendance: 19,193 (481 away); Referee: Ben Speedie

28 November 2023 20	Exeter City	0–0	Shrewsbury Town	Exeter
19:45 GMT	Sweeney (yellow card) 50'; Cole (yellow card) 69'	Report	Shipley (yellow card) 18'	Stadium: St James Park; Attendance: 5,288; Referee: Alan Young

9 December 2023 21	Exeter City	0–1	Port Vale	Exeter
15:00 GMT	Aimson (yellow card) 72' (yellow-red card) 90+1'; Scott (yellow card) 84'	Report	Arblaster 29'; Grant (yellow card) 54'; Debrah (yellow card) 85'	Stadium: St James Park; Attendance: 6,121; Referee: Neil Hair

16 December 2023 22	Stevenage	1–1	Exeter City	Stevenage
15:00 GMT	Piergianni 45+1'; Butler (yellow card) 53'	Report	Aitchison (yellow card) 23' (yellow-red card) 43'; Taylor (yellow card) 43'; Sweeney (yellow card) 46'; Wildschut 47'; Sinisalo (yellow card) 64'; Niskanen (yellow card) 75'	Stadium: Lamex Stadium; Attendance: 4,007 (352 away); Referee: Ross Joyce

22 December 2023 23	Cambridge United	2–0	Exeter City	Cambridge
19:45 GMT	Ahadme 17' (pen.); Kachunga 84'	Report	Carroll (yellow card) 20'; Cole (yellow card) 45+2'	Stadium: The Abbey Stadium; Attendance: 6,157 (298 away); Referee: Darren Drysdale

26 December 2023 24	Exeter City	1–0	Wycombe Wanderers	Exeter
15:00 GMT	Rankine (yellow card) 7'; Diabate (yellow card) 45+1'; Aitchison (yellow card) 62'; Cox 65'	Report	Vincent-Young (yellow card) 50'; Sadlier (yellow card) 69'; Leahy (penalty missed) 90+6'	Stadium: St James Park; Attendance: 7,128; Referee: Charles Breakspear

29 December 2023 25	Exeter City	0–0	Portsmouth	Exeter
19:45 GMT	Carroll (yellow card) 79'	Report	Raggett (yellow card) 60'; Sparkes (yellow card) 71'	Stadium: St James Park; Attendance: 8,322; Referee: Sunny Singh Gill

1 January 2024 26	Reading	3–2	Exeter City	Reading
15:00 GMT	Knibbs 9'; Craig (yellow card) 42'; Hartridge 45+2' (o.g.); Azeez 77'; Dorsett (yellow card) 81'	Report	Jules 18'; Rankine 68'	Stadium: Select Car Leasing Stadium; Attendance: 13,560 (1,246 away); Referee: Anthony Backhouse

6 January 2024 27	Exeter City	2–1	Carlisle United	Exeter
15:00 GMT	Harris (yellow card) 5'; Cole 57'; Jules (yellow card) 67'; Cox 77'; Wildschut (yellow card) 90'; Scott (yellow card) 90+8'	Report	Neal (yellow card) 64'; Butterworth 86'	Stadium: St James Park; Attendance: 6,420; Referee: Carl Brook

13 January 2024 28	Blackpool	2–0	Exeter City	Blackpool
15:00 GMT	Rhodes (penalty missed) 25'; Morgan 39', 49' (yellow card) 42'; Coulson (yellow card) 58'; Connolly (yellow card) 78'; Virtue (yellow card) 86'	Report	Hartridge (yellow card) 8'; Cole (yellow card) 27'; Sweeney (yellow card) 35'; Aitchison (yellow card) 41'; Diabate (yellow card) 90+2'	Stadium: Bloomfield Road; Attendance: 9,374 (425 away); Referee: Thomas Bramall

20 January 2024 29	Exeter City	0–0	Cambridge United	Exeter
15:00 GMT	Purrington (yellow card) 39'; Niskanen (yellow card) 45+1'	Report	Andrew (yellow card) 27'; Taylor (yellow card) 31'; Digby (yellow card) 50'; Kachunga (yellow card) 56'	Stadium: St James Park; Attendance: 6,343; Referee: Scott Simpson

23 January 2024 13	Bristol Rovers	0–1	Exeter City	Bristol
19:45 GMT	Evans (yellow card) 90+3'	Report	Cox 12'; Cole (yellow card) 77'; Wildschut (yellow card) 90+7'	Stadium: Memorial Stadium; Attendance: 8,543 (856 away); Referee: Jacob Miles
Note: Fixture was originally scheduled for 14 October, but was postponed due to international call-ups.

27 January 2024 30	Barnsley	1–2	Exeter City	Barnsley
15:00 GMT	Cotter (yellow card) 58'; De Gevigney 87'	Report	Aitchison 17' (yellow card) 90+6'; Cole 31'; Watts (yellow card) 83'; Hartridge (yellow card) 90+2'	Stadium: Oakwell Stadium; Attendance: 11,858 (341 away); Referee: Thomas Kirk

3 February 2024 31	Exeter City	0–1	Bristol Rovers	Exeter
15:00 GMT	Diabate (yellow card) 45'	Report	Aguilera 15'; Wilson (yellow card) 17'; Hunt (yellow card) 64'; Crama (yellow card) 80'	Stadium: St James Park; Attendance: 8,085; Referee: Will Finnie

6 February 2024 18	Exeter City	2–1	Peterborough United	Exeter
19:45 GMT	Niskanen (yellow card) 9'; Cole 75'; Katongo 80' (o.g.)	Report	Burrows 32' (pen.); Olakigbe (yellow card) 36' (yellow-red card) 55'; Knight (yellow card) 90+5'	Stadium: St James Park; Attendance: 5,277; Referee: Tom Reeves
Note: Fixture was originally scheduled for 18 November, but was postponed due to international call-ups.

10 February 2024 32	Wigan Athletic	1–2	Exeter City	Wigan
15:00 GMT	Adeeko (yellow card) 13'; Chambers (yellow card) 31'; Kelman 71'	Report	Eisa 10'; Harris (yellow card) 45'; Sweeney (yellow card) 50'; Aitchison 66'	Stadium: DW Stadium; Attendance: 9,431 (581 away); Referee: Alex Chilowicz

13 February 2024 33	Exeter City	0–3	Derby County	Exeter
19:45 GMT	Aitchison (yellow card) 49'; Carroll (yellow card) 72'	Report	Bird 24'; Mendez-Laing (yellow card) 26', (goal) 52'; Adams (yellow card) 43'; Barkhuizen 62'; Cashin (yellow card) 68'	Stadium: St James Park; Attendance: 7,754; Referee: Scott Tallis

17 February 2024 34	Lincoln City	1–0	Exeter City	Lincoln
15:00 GMT	Sørensen (yellow card) 42'; Taylor 67'	Report	Sweeney (yellow card) 17'; Harris (yellow card) 56'; Jules (yellow card) 72'	Stadium: LNER Stadium; Attendance: 7,609 (299 away); Referee: Matthew Corlett

24 February 2024 35	Exeter City	1–1	Fleetwood Town	Exeter
15:00 GMT	Harper 24'; Cole (yellow card) 50'; Sweeney (yellow card) 61'; Sinisalo (yellow card) 74'; Wildschut (yellow card) 78'	Report	Omochere 74'; Broom (yellow card) 84'	Stadium: St James Park; Attendance: 6,547; Referee: Sam Purkiss

2 March 2024 36	Peterborough United	2–1	Exeter City	Peterborough
15:00 GMT	Mason-Clark 4'; Poku 68'	Report	Carroll 36'; Harper (yellow card) 39'; Purrington (yellow card) 62'; Harris (yellow card) 84'; Rankine (yellow card) 85'; Niskanen (yellow card) 90+10'	Stadium: Weston Homes Stadium; Attendance: 7,496 (319 away); Referee: Marc Edwards

9 March 2024 37	Exeter City	2–2	Bolton Wanderers	Exeter
15:00 GMT	Cox 46', 49'; Aitchison (yellow card) 73'; Sweeney (yellow card) 90+7'	Report	Maghoma 33'; Toal 87'	Stadium: St James Park; Attendance: 6,748; Referee: Daniel Middleton

12 March 2024 38	Shrewsbury Town	0–3	Exeter City	Shrewsbury
19:45 GMT	Sraha (yellow card) 5'; Shipley (red card) 6'; Bayliss (yellow card) 41'; Benning (yellow card) 42'	Report	Harper (yellow card) 27'; Cole (yellow card) 29'; Aimson 34'; Harris 41'; Aitchison 45+5'; Eisa (yellow card) 90+3'	Stadium: The Croud Meadow; Attendance: 4,960 (249 away); Referee: David Rock

16 March 2024 39	Exeter City	1–0	Burton Albion	Exeter
15:00 GMT	Sweeney (yellow card) 30'; Cole 41', (yellow card) 83'; Aitchison (yellow card) 43'; Jules (red card) 45+6'; Carroll (yellow card) 65'	Report	Caprice (yellow card) 2'; Harper (yellow card) 55'; Carayol (yellow card) 83'	Stadium: St James Park; Attendance: 6,188; Referee: Martin Woods

29 March 2024 41	Exeter City	1–1	Charlton Athletic	Exeter
15:00 GMT	Purrington 6'; R. Woods (yellow card) 78'	Report	Thomas (yellow card) 37'; Diabate 87' (o.g.)	Stadium: St James Park; Attendance: 8,088; Referee: Declan Bourne

1 April 2024 42	Cheltenham Town	1–2	Exeter City	Cheltenham
15:00 BST	Kinsella (yellow card) 38'; Williams 51'; Thomas (yellow card) 59'; Nuttall (yellow card) 60'; Long (yellow card) 84'; Harrop (yellow card) 86'	Report	Sweeney (yellow card) 42'; Harris 56'; Cole 90' (pen.)	Stadium: Completely-Suzuki Stadium; Attendance: 5,657 (1,522 away); Referee: Stephen Martin

6 April 2024 43	Exeter City	1–0	Stevenage	Exeter
15:00 BST	Carroll (yellow card) 22'; Cole 38'; Watts (yellow card) 69'; Sweeney (yellow card) 90+3'	Report	Butler (yellow card) 7'; L. Thompson (yellow card) 47'; Hemmings (yellow card) 69'; N. Thompson (yellow card) 86'	Stadium: St James Park; Attendance: 6,314; Referee: Lewis Smith

9 April 2024 40	Leyton Orient	2–2	Exeter City	Leyton
19:45 BST	O'Neill 36'; Moncur 64'	Report	Alli 88'; Aimson 90+2'	Stadium: Gaughan Group Stadium; Attendance: 7,028 (669 away); Referee: Scott Jackson
Note: Fixture was originally scheduled for 23 March, but was postponed due to international call-ups.

13 April 2024 44	Port Vale	2–4	Exeter City	Burslem
15:00 BST	Sang (yellow card) 28'; Chislett 31'; Dipepa 40'	Report	Alli (yellow card) 7', (goal) 57', 89'; Watts (yellow card) 35'; Purrington (yellow card) 41'; Harris (yellow card) 47', (goal) 79'; Jules 67'	Stadium: Vale Park; Attendance: 6,686 (384 away); Referee: Marc Edwards

20 April 2024 45	Northampton Town	1–2	Exeter City	Northampton
14:00 BST	Guthrie (yellow card) 45', (goal) 73'	Report	Harris 20'; R. Woods (red card) 44'; Aimson 83'	Stadium: Sixfields Stadium; Attendance: 7,097 (647 away); Referee: Ruebyn Ricardo
Note: Fixture was initially scheduled to kick-off at 15:00, but was moved to avoid a logistical issue with Northampton Saints fixture the same day.

27 April 2024 46	Exeter City	1–2	Oxford United	Exeter
12:30 BST	Aimson (yellow card) 45+6'; Alli 52'; Harris (yellow card) 90+3'	Report	Harris 12'; Brannagan 40' (pen.); Stevens (yellow card) 84'; Cumming (yellow card) 89'	Stadium: St James Park; Attendance: 8,123; Referee: Tom Reeves

=== FA Cup ===
Exeter were drawn at home to Wigan Athletic in the first round.

Win Draw Loss Fixtures

4 November 2023 First Round	Exeter City	0–2	Wigan Athletic	Exeter
15:00 GMT	Sweeney (yellow card) 42'; Kite (yellow card) 45+3'; Trevitt (yellow card) 85'; Aimson (yellow card) 90+1'	Report	Aasgaard 58' (yellow card) 59'; Sessegnon 87'	Stadium: St James Park; Attendance: 3,512; Referee: Craig Hicks

=== EFL Cup ===
Exeter were drawn at home to Crawley Town in the first round, Stevenage in the second round, Luton Town in the third round and Middlesbrough in the fourth round.

Win Draw Loss Fixtures

8 August 2023 First round	Exeter City	2–1	Crawley Town	Exeter
19:45 BST	Aimson (yellow card) 51'; Taylor 73'; Diabate (yellow card) 81'; Scott 84'; Rankine (yellow card) 90+8'; Richards (yellow card) 90+10'	Report	Lolos 15', (yellow card) 90+3'; Omole (yellow card) 18'; Mukena (yellow card) 40'; Henry (yellow card) 71'; Johnson (yellow card) 76'; Fish (yellow card) 81'	Stadium: St James Park; Attendance: 3,560; Referee: Christopher Pollard

29 August 2023 Second round	Exeter City	1–1 (5–3 p)	Stevenage	Exeter
19:45 BST	Hartridge 5'; Trevitt (yellow card) 8'; Sweeney (yellow card) 30'	Report	Butler (yellow card) 63'; Roberts 69'; L. Thompson (yellow card) 89'	Stadium: St James Park; Attendance: 4,006; Referee: Andrew Kitchen
	Penalties
	Trevitt (penalty scored); Carroll (penalty scored); Aimson (penalty scored); Taylor (penalty scored); Sweeney (penalty scored)		Reid (penalty scored); Roberts (penalty scored); Butler (penalty missed); Sweeney (penalty scored)

26 September 2023 Third round	Exeter City	1–0	Luton Town	Exeter
19:45 BST	Mitchell (yellow card) 48' (yellow-red card) 88' (goal) 83'; Harper (yellow card) 51'; Sinisalo (yellow card) 78'; Sweeney (yellow card) 90+6'; Carroll (yellow card) 90+6'	Report	Mengi (yellow card) 35'; Chong (yellow card) 42'	Stadium: St James Park; Attendance: 7,360; Referee: James Bell

31 October 2023 Fourth round	Exeter City	2–3	Middlesbrough	Exeter
19:45 GMT	Trevitt 13' (yellow card) 37' (goal) 66'; Diabate (yellow card) 68'; Kite (yellow card) 75'	Report	Silvera (yellow card) 44' (goal) 59'; Rogers 49' (yellow card) 75'; Latte Lath 82' (pen.) (yellow card) 83'	Stadium: St James Park; Attendance: 7,601; Referee: Graham Scott

=== EFL Trophy ===
In the group stage, Exeter City were drawn in Southern Group G alongside Reading, Swindon Town and Arsenal U21.

Pos	Div	Team	Pld	W	PW	PL	L	GF	GA	GD	Pts	Qualification
1	L1	Reading	3	3	0	0	0	19	2	+17	9	Advance to Round 2
2	ACA	Arsenal U21	3	1	1	0	1	9	7	+2	5	Advance to Round 2
3	L1	Exeter City	3	1	0	0	2	1	14	−13	3	
4	L2	Swindon Town	3	0	0	1	2	2	8	−6	1	

Updated to match(es) played on 14 November 2023. Source: EFL.com

Win Draw Loss Fixtures

19 September 2023 Group stage	Exeter City	0–9	Reading	Exeter
19:00 BST	Daniels (yellow card) 49'	Report	McIntyre 3' (yellow card) 47'; Jules 32' (o.g.); Mukairu 56', 60'; Ballard 67', 90+6'; Elliott 79'; Harris 85'; Vickers 90'	Stadium: St. James Park; Attendance: 1,871; Referee: Carl Brook

10 October 2023 Group stage	Exeter City	0–5	Arsenal U21	Exeter
19:15 BST	James (yellow card) 55'; Taylor (yellow card) 83'; Borges (yellow card) 90+2'	Report	Henry-Francis (yellow card) 10' (goal) 90'; Sweet (yellow card) 55'; Sagoe Junior 61'; Ferdinand 79', 90+7'; Edwards 82'	Stadium: St James Park; Attendance: 3,311; Referee: Edward Duckworth

21 November 2023 Group stage	Swindon Town	0–1	Exeter City	Swindon
19:00 GMT		Report	Minturn 6' (o.g.); Diabate (yellow card) 82'; Harper (yellow card) 83'	Stadium: County Ground; Attendance: 644; Referee: Ollie Yates
