= Shaun MacDonald (footballer, born 1996) =

English footballer

Personal information
- Full name: Shaun Wesley MacDonald
- Date of birth: 20 October 1996 (age 30)
- Height: 1.85 m (6 ft 1 in)
- Position: Goalkeeper

Team information
- Current team: Newport County
- Number: 33

Senior career*
Years	Team	Apps	(Gls)
2015–2017	Gateshead	2	(0)
2017–2018	Blyth Spartans	1	(0)
2018–2022	Torquay United	101	(0)
2022–2023	Cheltenham Town	0	(0)
2023–2025	Exeter City	0	(0)
2025–2026	Newport County	0	(0)
2026–	Newport County	0	(0)
- * Club domestic league appearances and goals as of 14:53, 16 January 2026 (UTC)

Shaun Wesley MacDonald (born 20 October 1996) is an English professional footballer who plays as a goalkeeper for Newport County.

== Career ==
MacDonald spent his early career in non-league football with Gateshead, Blyth Spartans and Torquay United. He moved to Cheltenham Town in July 2022. He was released by Cheltenham after one season with the club.

On 9 September 2023, MacDonald signed a short-term contract with Exeter City, until January 2024. With his short-term contract expiring, he extended his deal until the end of the season. He was released by Exeter at the end of the 2024–25 season.

On 3 October 2025, MacDonald signed a contract until the end of the 2025–26 season with EFL League Two club Newport County as cover for Jordan Wright and Nik Tzanev. He departed the club in January 2026 without having made an appearance, but re-signed for the club later that month.

== Career statistics ==
As of match played 10 December 2024

Appearances and goals by club, season and competition
Club	Season	League			FA Cup		EFL Cup		Other		Total	
Club	Season	Division	Apps	Goals	Apps	Goals	Apps	Goals	Apps	Goals	Apps	Goals
Gateshead	2015–16	National League	2	0	1	0	—		1 (Note: Appearance(s) in FA Trophy)	0	4	0
Gateshead	2016–17	National League	0	0	0	0	—		1 (Note: Appearance in Durham Challenge Cup)	0	1	0
Gateshead	Total		2	0	1	0	0	0	2	0	5	0
Blyth Spartans	2017–18	National League North	1	0	0	0	—		5 (Note: Three appearances in FA Trophy, two appearances in Northumberland Senior Cup)	0	5	0
Torquay United	2018–19	National League South	34	0	4	0	—		2	0	40	0
Torquay United	2019–20	National League	11	0	1	0	—		2	0	14	0
Torquay United	2020–21	National League	19	0	1	0	—		2	0	22	0
Torquay United	2021–22	National League	37	0	2	0	—		0	0	39	0
Torquay United	Total		101	0	8	0	0	0	6	0	115	0
Cheltenham Town	2023–24	League One	0	0	0	0	0	0	4 (Note: Appearance(s) in EFL Trophy)	0	4	0
Exeter City	2023–24	League One	0	0	0	0	0	0	2	0	2	0
Exeter City	2024–25	League One	0	0	0	0	0	0	4	0	4	0
Exeter City	Total		0	0	0	0	0	0	6	0	6	0
Career total			104	0	9	0	0	0	18	0	131	0

== Honours ==
Individual

- Torquay United Player of the Year: 2021–22
