= Cheick Diabate (footballer, born 2002) =

English footballer

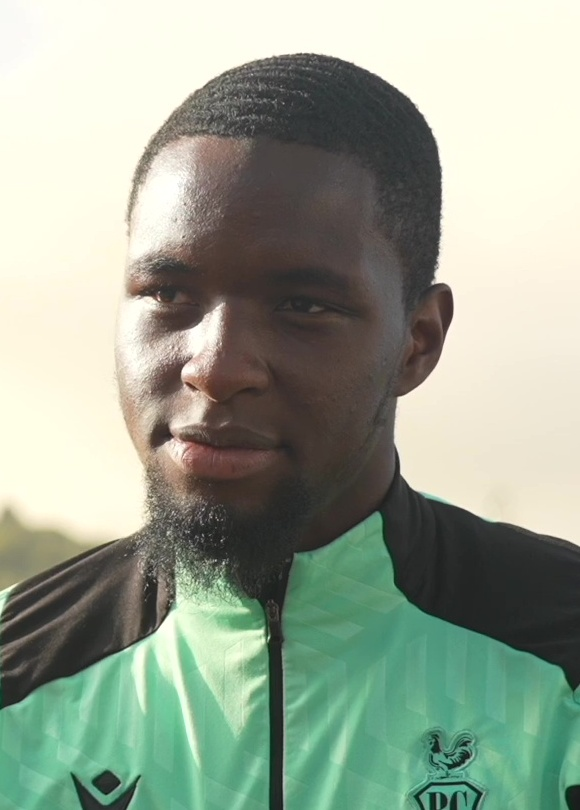

Personal information
- Full name: Cheick Tiemoko Diabate
- Date of birth: 21 January 2002 (age 24)
- Place of birth: Southwark, England
- Height: 6 ft 1 in (1.86 m)
- Position: Defender

Team information
- Current team: St Johnstone
- Number: 3

Youth career
- –2018: Stevenage
- 2018–2019: Exeter City

Senior career*
Years	Team	Apps	(Gls)
2019–2025	Exeter City	70	(3)
2020	→ Buckland Athletic (loan)	1	(0)
2020	→ Bideford (loan)	0	(0)
2020	→ Tiverton Town (loan)	3	(0)
2021	→ Truro City (loan)	14	(2)
2024–2025	→ Bradford City (loan)	11	(0)
2025–	St Johnstone	34	(3)
- * Club domestic league appearances and goals as of 4 May 2026

Cheick Tiemoko Diabate (born 21 January 2002) is an English professional footballer who plays as a defender for Scottish Premiership club St Johnstone.

== Career ==
=== Exeter City ===
Diabate started his career at Stevenage before a move to Exeter City in 2018. He first appeared in a matchday squad during Exeter's 2–0 away EFL Trophy group-stage victory over Newport County in October 2019, and then later that season enjoyed a brief loan spell with Buckland Athletic. In a disrupted 2020–21 campaign, Diabate had loan spells at Bideford and Tiverton Town before making his Exeter debut in November 2020, featuring for the final twenty-eight minutes of their EFL Trophy tie with West Bromwich Albion U23s, which resulted in a 4–0 win for The Grecians.

On 14 July 2021, Diabate joined Southern League Premier Division South side, Truro City and went onto make his debut during a 1–1 draw with Walton Casuals a month later. He then scored his first career goal in a 4–1 away victory over Poole Town in October before eventually returning to Exeter two months later following an injury crisis at the Devon-based side. He made his league debut for the club just a week later in a 2–1 defeat to Sutton United. He went on to feature heavily in the second half of Exeter's season as they secured promotion to League One. Diabate was rewarded with a new two-year contract in June 2022.

On 30 August 2024, Diabate joined League Two club Bradford City on a season-long loan deal. He was recalled in January 2025.

On 5 May 2025, Exeter announced the player would leave the club in June when his contract expired.

=== St Johnstone ===
On 7 July 2025, Diabate joined Scottish Championship side St Johnstone on a one-year deal.

== Personal life ==
Diabate's cousin Mory Koné is a former professional footballer, having played for Troyes, Le Mans, and Parma.

Diabate is a Muslim.

== Career statistics ==
As of end of 2024–25 season

Appearances and goals by club, season and competition
Club	Season	League			FA Cup		EFL Cup		Other		Total	
Club	Season	Division	Apps	Goals	Apps	Goals	Apps	Goals	Apps	Goals	Apps	Goals
Exeter City	2019–20	League Two	0	0	0	0	0	0	0	0	0	0
Exeter City	2020–21	League Two	0	0	0	0	0	0	1 (Note: Appearance(s) in the EFL Trophy)	0	1	0
Exeter City	2021–22	League Two	18	2	0	0	0	0	1	0	19	2
Exeter City	2022–23	League One	20	1	1	0	1	0	1	0	23	1
Exeter City	2023–24	League One	28	0	1	0	2	0	1	0	32	0
Exeter City	2024–25	League One	4	0	0	0	1	0	0	0	4	0
Exeter City	Total		70	3	2	0	4	0	4	0	80	3
Buckland Athletic (loan)	2019–20	Western League Premier Division	1	0	—		—		—		1	0
Bideford (loan)	2020–21	Southern League Division One South	0	0	0	0	—		0	0	0	0
Tiverton Town (loan)	2020–21	Southern League Premier Division South	1	0	—		—		1 (Note: Appearances in the FA Trophy)	0	2	0
Truro City (loan)	2021–22	Southern League Premier Division South	14	2	0	0	—		3	0	17	2
Bradford City (loan)	2024–25	EFL League Two	11	0	1	0	0	0	3	0	15	0
Career total			97	5	3	0	4	0	11	0	115	5

== Honours ==
Exeter City

- League Two runner-up: 2021–22

St Johnstone

- Scottish Championship: 2025–26
