= Mitch Beardmore =

English footballer

Personal information
- Full name: Mitchell Reuben Beardmore
- Date of birth: 7 September 2004 (age 22)
- Place of birth: South Somerset, England
- Positions: Midfielder; wing-back

Team information
- Current team: Weymouth

Youth career
- 2018–2020: Yeovil Town
- 2020–2022: Exeter City

Senior career*
Years	Team	Apps	(Gls)
2022–2025	Exeter City	1	(0)
2023	→ Tavistock (loan)	3	(3)
2023	→ Tiverton Town (loan)	2	(0)
2024	→ Mousehole (loan)	16	(4)
2024–2025	→ Plymouth Parkway (loan)	20	(11)
2025	→ Bath City (loan)	19	(1)
2025–2026	Bath City	29	(1)
2026	→ Plymouth Parkway (loan)	2	(2)
2026–	Weymouth	0	(0)
- * Club domestic league appearances and goals as of 17:24, 25 April 2026 (UTC)

Mitchell Reuben Beardmore (born 7 September 2004) is an English professional footballer who plays as a midfielder for Southern League Division One South club Weymouth.

== Early life ==
Mitchell Reuben Beardmore was born 7 September 2004, in South Somerset, England.

== Career ==
=== Exeter City ===
Beardmore was with Yeovil Town until their Academy closed in 2020. He started a two-year scholarship with Exeter City in August 2021. He played for the under-18s in the EFL Youth Alliance and FA Youth Cup. He played on the losing side of the Devon St Luke's Bowl final in May 2022. He made his senior debut for Exeter City on 18 October 2022, in a 4–1 defeat at Forest Green Rovers in the group stages of the EFL Trophy. Speaking the following month, manager Gary Caldwell said that "I have been delighted with what I have seen from him and he has been on the bench on merit as he is doing well". He signed his first professional contract with Exeter in March 2023, having been in seven matchday squads to the 2022–23 season up to that point. On 9 September 2023, he made his League One debut as a late substitute in a 2–1 defeat to Leyton Orient. In October 2023, he joined Tavistock on a one-month loan deal before joining Tiverton Town upon the conclusion of this agreement. As of January 25, 2024 Beardmore joined cornish football side Mousehole A.F.C. on loan for the remainder of the 2023-24 Southern Football League season.

In August 2024, Beardmore, alongside teammate Tom Dean, joined Plymouth Parkway on loan until January 2025. On 21 December 2024, Beardmore starred in a 6–0 victory over Gloucester City, scoring all six goals for his side.

On 7 January 2025, Bearmore joined National League South side Bath City on an initial one-month loan deal, later extended until the end of the season.

On 5 May 2025, Exeter announced the player would leave the club in June when his contract expired.

=== Bath City ===
On 8 June 2025, Beardmore agreed to return to National League South side Bath City on a permanent basis.

== Style of play ==
Beardmore can play as a wing-back or as a midfielder. He has good ball control skills, work-rate and aggression.

== Career statistics ==
As of end of 2025–26 season

Appearances and goals by club, season and competition
Club	Season	League			FA Cup		EFL Cup		Other		Total	
Club	Season	Division	Apps	Goals	Apps	Goals	Apps	Goals	Apps	Goals	Apps	Goals
Exeter City	2022–23	League One	0	0	0	0	0	0	1 (Note: Appearance(s) in EFL Trophy)	0	1	0
Exeter City	2023–24	League One	1	0	0	0	1	0	2	0	4	0
Exeter City	2024–25	League One	0	0	0	0	0	0	0	0	0	0
Exeter City	Total		1	0	0	0	1	0	3	0	5	0
Tavistock (loan)	2023–24	Southern League Division One South	3	3	0	0	—		0	0	3	3
Tiverton Town (loan)	2023–24	Southern League Premier Division South	9	0	0	0	—		0	0	9	0
Mousehole (loan)	2023–24	Southern League Division One South	16	4	0	0	—		1 (Note: Appearance(s) in Southern League Division One South play-offs)	0	17	4
Plymouth Parkway (loan)	2024–25	Southern League Premier Division South	20	11	4	0	—		2 (Note: Appearances in FA Trophy)	0	26	11
Bath City (loan)	2024–25	National League South	19	1	—		—		—		19	1
Bath City	2025–26	National League South	29	1	1	0	—		6 (Note: Three appearances in FA Trophy, three appearances in Somerset Premier Cup)	0	36	1
Plymouth Parkway (loan)	2025–26	Southern League Premier Division South	2	2	—		—		—		2	2
Career total			99	22	5	0	1	0	12	0	117	22
