= Viljami Sinisalo =

Finnish footballer (born 2001)

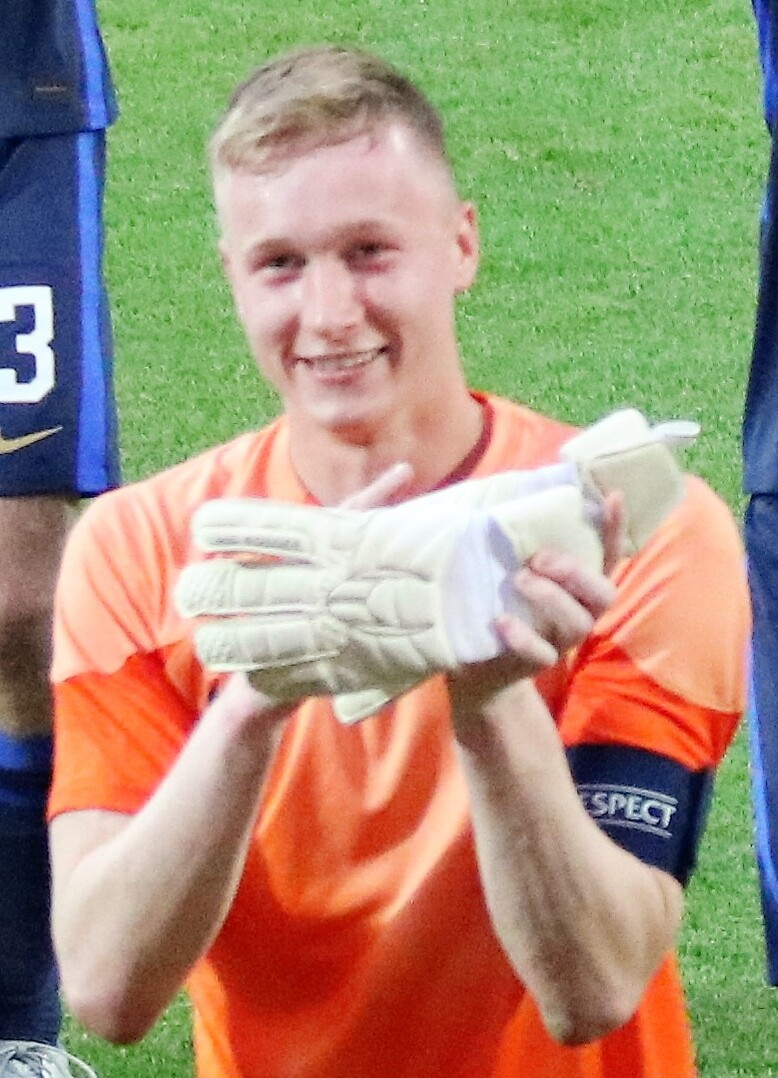
- Sinisalo with Finland U21 in 2022

Personal information
- Full name: Viljami Kari Veikko Sinisalo
- Date of birth: 11 October 2001 (age 25)
- Place of birth: Espoo, Finland
- Height: 1.90 m (6 ft 3 in)
- Position: Goalkeeper

Team information
- Current team: Celtic
- Number: 1

Youth career
- HyPS
- –2014: HJK
- 2015–2016: Honka

Senior career*
Years	Team	Apps	(Gls)
2017–2018	FC Espoo	1	(0)
2018–2024	Aston Villa	0	(0)
2020–2021	→ Ayr United (loan)	22	(0)
2022	→ Burton Albion (loan)	4	(0)
2023–2024	→ Exeter City (loan)	45	(0)
2024–	Celtic	26	(0)

International career^{‡}
2016–2017	Finland U16	5	(0)
2017–2018	Finland U17	11	(0)
2019	Finland U18	3	(0)
2019	Finland U19	5	(0)
2020–2022	Finland U21	14	(0)
2023–	Finland	9	(0)
- * Club domestic league appearances and goals as of 18 October 2026 ‡ National team caps and goals as of 15 November 2026

Viljami Kari Veikko Sinisalo (Vil-YAH-mee-Sin-uh-SAL-oh, born 11 October 2001) is a Finnish professional footballer who plays as a goalkeeper for Scottish Premiership club Celtic, and the Finland national team.

Sinisalo previously played for a number of junior sides in Southwest Finland, ending up at amateur side Espoo in the Finnish Kakkonen (third tier), where he made his league debut aged only fifteen; he joined Aston Villa's academy side the following year. Sinisalo has played on loan at Ayr United and Burton Albion. He has appeared regularly at youth international level for Finland before debuting for their senior side in 2023.

== Club career ==
=== Early career ===
Sinisalo spent his youth career with HyPS, HJK and Honka, and made his senior league debut for FC Espoo in third-tier level Kakkonen in June 2017, aged only 15.

=== Aston Villa ===
He joined the U21 academy at Steve Bruce's Aston Villa in 2018, and was a regular player in their under-18 and under-23 sides.

On 25 September 2020, Sinisalo joined Ayr United in the Scottish Championship on loan until the end of the season. He made his Ayr United debut on 6 October 2020, in a 5–2 away Scottish League Cup victory over Albion Rovers. On 8 April 2021, Sinisalo's loan was cut short, after he suffered a groin injury and returned to Aston Villa.

On 6 July 2021, Sinisalo was amongst several Academy players who were given new professional contracts. One year on, on 6 July 2022, Sinisalo renewed his Aston Villa contract once again.

On 11 July 2022, Sinisalo signed for League One club Burton Albion on a season-long loan. He made his debut on 9 August 2022, in a 2–0 EFL Cup defeat to Rochdale. The loan was ended early and Sinisalo returned to Villa on 1 January 2023. He made a total of eight appearances for the League One outfit.

On 19 July 2023, Sinisalo joined Exeter City on a season-long loan. He was given the number 1 shirt, and got a clean sheet on his debut, a 3–0 League One victory over Wycombe Wanderers on 5 August 2023. During the season, Sinisalo made 50 appearances for the club in all competitions combined, recording 14 clean sheets. He was named The Player of the Year by the players and by the supporters of Exeter City, additionally winning four other awards in the club's end of season gala on 29 April 2024.

=== Celtic ===
On 16 July 2024, Sinisalo signed for Scottish Premiership club Celtic on a five-year deal for an undisclosed fee, reported to be £1 million. He was given the number 12 shirt. On 8 February 2025, he made his debut for the club in a 5–0 home victory against Raith Rovers in the Scottish Cup. Following an injury to Kasper Schmeichel whilst on international duty, Sinisalo made his league debut in a 3–0 home victory against Hearts on 29 March 2025. After the game, his performance was praised by Celtic manager Brendan Rodgers, who called him "excellent".

In his second season, he again played second fiddle to Schmeichel for most of the season, only playing in a handful of cup games, though he was given the chance to start against Stuttgart in the UEFA Europa League on 26 March 2026, which was also his debut in UEFA club competitions. He kept a clean sheet as Celtic won 1–0, though it was not enough to keep them in the tournament. Within the same week, due to Schmeichel suffering another injury, coinciding with a drop in form, Sinisalo played in an Old Firm game which ended in a 2–2 draw at Ibrox Stadium, and made an outstanding save against Aberdeen to enable a 2–1 victory at Pittodrie.

Following Schmeichel's retirement, Sinisalo was handed the number 1 jersey for the 2026–27 season.

== International career ==
=== Youth ===
Sinisalo has played for Finland at under-17 and under-19 levels. On 17 November 2020, he made his debut for the Under-21s in a UEFA European Under-21 Championship qualifier against Malta. Sinisalo was named Finland U21's captain for their 15 November 2021 UEFA European Under-21 Championship qualifier against Estonia. In December 2022, Sinisalo was named Finland's U21 Player of the Year for 2022.

=== Senior ===
On 14 September 2022, Sinisalo was called up in the Finland senior squad, previous to their UEFA Nations League matches against Romania and Montenegro. However, he was an unused substitute in both games.

On 12 January 2023, Sinisalo made his debut in the Finland senior national team in a 1–0 friendly defeat to Estonia. Sinisalo made his competitive international debut on 20 November 2023, in a UEFA Euro 2024 qualifying match against San Marino.

== Personal life ==
Viljami Sinisalo's grandfather was the actor Veikko Sinisalo and his great-grandfather was the politician Väinö Sinisalo.

== Career statistics ==
=== Club ===
As of match played 18 October 2026

Appearances and goals by club, season, and competition
Club	Season	League			National cup (Note: Includes Scottish Cup and FA Cup)		League cup (Note: Includes Scottish League Cup and EFL League Cup)		Continental		Other		Total	
Club	Season	Division	Apps	Goals	Apps	Goals	Apps	Goals	Apps	Goals	Apps	Goals	Apps	Goals
Espoo	2017	Kakkonen	1	0	0	0	–		–		–		1	0
Aston Villa	2020–21	Premier League	0	0	0	0	0	0	–		1 (Note: Appearances in EFL Trophy)	0	1	0
Aston Villa	2021–22	Premier League	0	0	0	0	0	0	–		1	0	1	0
Aston Villa	Total		0	0	0	0	0	0	–		2	0	2	0
Ayr United (loan)	2020–21	Scottish Championship	22	0	2	0	5	0	–		–		29	0
Burton Albion (loan)	2022–23	League One	4	0	1	0	1	0	–		2	0	8	0
Exeter City (loan)	2023–24	League One	45	0	1	0	4	0	–		0	0	50	0
Celtic	2024–25	Scottish Premiership	6	0	2	0	0	0	0	0	–		8	0
Celtic	2025–26	Scottish Premiership	12	0	5	0	2	0	1 (Note: Appearance in UEFA Europa League)	0	–		20	0
Celtic	2026–27	Scottish Premiership	8	0	0	0	1	0	4 (Note: Two appearances in UEFA Champions League, two appearances in UEFA Europa League)	0	–		13	0
Celtic	Total		26	0	7	0	3	0	5	0	–		41	0
Career total			98	0	11	0	13	0	5	0	4	0	131	0

=== International ===
As of match played 15 November 2026

Appearances and goals by national team and year
National team	Year	Apps	Goals
Finland	2023	2	0
Finland	2024	1	0
Finland	2025	3	0
Finland	2026	3	0
Total		9	0

== Honours ==
Celtic

- Scottish Premiership: 2024–25, 2025–26
- Scottish Cup: 2025–26
- Scottish League Cup: 2024–25

Finland

- FIFA Series: 2026

Individual

- Exeter City Players' Player of the Season: 2023–24
- Exeter City Supporters' Player of the Season: 2023–24
