= Harry Lee (footballer, born 2004) =

English footballer

Personal information
- Full name: Harrison David Lee
- Date of birth: 22 December 2004 (age 21)
- Place of birth: Torbay, England
- Position: Goalkeeper

Team information
- Current team: Crystal Palace
- Number: 41

Youth career
- –2015: Torquay United
- 2015–2021: Exeter City

Senior career*
Years	Team	Apps	(Gls)
2021–2025	Exeter City	5	(0)
2021–2022	→ Dorchester Town (loan)	4	(0)
2022	→ Dorchester Town (loan)	9	(0)
2023	→ Plymouth Parkway (loan)	11	(0)
2023	→ Weston-super-Mare (loan)	15	(0)
2024	→ Salisbury (loan)	5	(0)
2024	→ Plymouth Parkway (loan)	6	(0)
2025	→ Dorchester Town (loan)	12	(0)
2025–	Crystal Palace	0	(0)
- * Club domestic league appearances and goals as of 10:49, 2 July 2025 (UTC)

Harrison David Lee (born 22 December 2004) is an English professional footballer who plays as a goalkeeper for Premier League club Crystal Palace.

== Early and personal life ==
Lee is a Torquay United fan and season ticket holder; he attended Torquay Academy.

== Playing career ==
=== Exeter City ===
Lee joined Exeter City when Torquay United closed their academy in 2015. He was named on the Exeter City substitute bench in EFL League Two fixtures during the 2020–21 season at the age of just 15. He turned professional at the club in summer 2021. He made his first-team debut in the EFL Trophy, in a 1–1 draw with Chelsea U21 at St James Park. He saved two penalties in a shoot-out victory over Cheltenham Town in the next EFL Trophy game. Manager Matt Taylor said he would look to let Lee go out on loan into non-League as it was a "big ask" to expect a 16-year old to play in the English Football League. He joined Southern League Premier Division South side Dorchester Town on a one-month loan deal starting on 22 October, after regular custodian Gerard Benfield dislocated his fingers., however Lee was recalled soon after to become Exeter's back-up goalkeeper after the departure of Scott Brown to Rotherham United. Lee made his EFL league debut on the 25 October 2022 as an 88th-minute substitute against Derby County due to an injury picked up by Exeter's regular goalkeeper Jamal Blackman.

In October 2024, Lee returned to Plymouth Parkway on a one-month loan deal, making his debut in FA Cup 4th qualifying round tie, at home to Worthing. In January 2025, he returned to Dorchester Town on a one-month loan deal.

Having been offered a new contract at the end of the 2024–25 season, Lee declined the offer and departed the club.

=== Crystal Palace ===
On 15 August 2025, Lee joined Premier League club Crystal Palace.

== Career statistics ==
As of match played 8 February 2025

Appearances and goals by club, season and competition
Club	Season	League			FA Cup		EFL Cup		Other		Total	
Club	Season	Division	Apps	Goals	Apps	Goals	Apps	Goals	Apps	Goals	Apps	Goals
Exeter City	2021–22	EFL League Two	0	0	0	0	0	0	3 (Note: Appearance(s) in EFL Trophy)	0	3	0
Exeter City	2022–23	EFL League One	1	0	0	0	0	0	1	0	2	0
Exeter City	2023–24	EFL League One	0	0	0	0	0	0	0	0	0	0
Exeter City	2024–25	EFL League One	0	0	0	0	0	0	0	0	0	0
Exeter City	Total		1	0	0	0	0	0	4	0	5	0
Dorchester Town (loan)	2021–22	SFL - Premier Division South	4	0	0	0	—		1 (Note: Appearance(s) in FA Trophy)	0	5	0
Dorchester Town (loan)	2022–23	Southern League Premier South	9	0	4	0	0	0	0	0	13	0
Plymouth Parkway (loan)	2022–23	Southern League Premier South	11	0	0	0	0	0	0	0	11	0
Weston-super-Mare (loan)	2023–24	National League South	15	0	3	0	0	0	2 (Note: 1 Appearance(s) in FA Trophy and 1 appearance in Somerset Premier Cup)	0	20	0
Salisbury (loan)	2023–24	Southern League Premier South	5	0	0	0	0	0	0	0	5	0
Plymouth Parkway (loan)	2024–25	Southern League Premier South	6	0	1	0	0	0	1	0	8	0
Dorchester Town (loan)	2024–25	Southern League Premier South	3	0	0	0	0	0	0	0	3	0
Career total			54	0	8	0	0	0	8	0	70	0
