= Dion Rankine =

English footballer (born 2002)

Personal information
- Full name: Dion Joseph Rankine
- Date of birth: 15 October 2002 (age 24)
- Place of birth: Barnet, England
- Height: 1.65 m (5 ft 5 in)
- Position: Winger

Team information
- Current team: Eastleigh (on loan from Crewe Alexandra)
- Number: 17

Youth career
- 2011–2016: Cambridge United
- 2016–2023: Chelsea

Senior career*
Years	Team	Apps	(Gls)
2023–2024	Chelsea	0	(0)
2023–2024	→ Exeter City (loan)	33	(1)
2024–2025	Wigan Athletic	20	(1)
2025–	Crewe Alexandra	11	(0)
2026–	→ Eastleigh (loan)	10	(0)
- * Club domestic league appearances and goals as of 09:00, 28 September 2026 (UTC)

Dion Joseph Rankine (born 15 October 2002) is an English professional footballer who plays as a winger for Eastleigh, on loan from EFL League Two club Crewe Alexandra.

== Club career ==
Born in Barnet, Rankine started his career with the Cambridge United academy as an under-9, before joining Premier League side Chelsea as an Under-14 in 2016. He had been utilised as a full-back, a wing-back, and as a winger. Rankine signed his first professional contract in October 2019, going on to extend this deal in 2021.

Rankine had been the top appearance maker in the development squad with 25 starts during the 2022–23 Premier League 2 season, he scored five goals. He had also featured eight times in EFL Trophy, including facing his future club Exeter City in August 2021. It was reported that Rankine had signed a new deal with Chelsea in January 2023.

On 12 July 2023, Rankine joined EFL League One side Exeter City on a season-long loan.

=== Wigan Athletic ===
On 13 June 2024, Rankine joined League One side Wigan Athletic on a permanent deal from Chelsea, signing a three-year contract. He made 26 appearances, scoring once - in a 2–2 draw against Blackpool on 28 October 2024.

=== Crewe Alexandra ===
On 1 September 2025, Rankine joined EFL League Two club Crewe Alexandra on a two-year deal with an option for a further 12 months, and made his team debut on 6 September 2025 in a 1–1 draw at Colchester United.

On 6 August 2026, Rankine joined National League club Eastleigh on loan until January 2027.

== Career statistics ==
=== Club ===
As of 26 September 2026

Appearances and goals by club, season and competition
Club	Season	League			FA Cup		EFL Cup		Other		Total	
Club	Season	Division	Apps	Goals	Apps	Goals	Apps	Goals	Apps	Goals	Apps	Goals
Chelsea U21	2020–21	—			—		—		1 (Note: Appearance(s) in EFL Trophy)	0	1	0
Chelsea U21	2021–22	—			—		—		3	0	3	0
Chelsea U21	2022–23	—			—		—		4	0	4	0
Chelsea U21	Total		—		—		—		8	0	8	0
Chelsea	2023–24	Premier League	0	0	0	0	0	0	—		0	0
Exeter City (loan)	2023–24	League One	33	1	0	0	2	0	1	0	36	1
Wigan Athletic	2024–25	League One	20	1	2	0	1	0	3	0	26	1
Crewe Alexandra	2025–26	League Two	11	0	1	0	0	0	3	1	15	1
Eastleigh	2026–27	National League	10	0	0	0	0	0	0	0	10	0
Career total			74	2	3	0	3	0	15	1	95	3
