= Ed James (footballer) =

Welsh professional footballer

Personal information
- Full name: Edward George Martin James
- Date of birth: 23 December 2004 (age 21)
- Place of birth: Exeter, England
- Height: 1.85 m (6 ft 1 in)
- Position: Defender

Team information
- Current team: Exeter City
- Number: 40

Youth career
- –2022: Exeter City

Senior career*
| Years | Team | Apps | (Gls) |
| 2022– | Exeter City | 11 | (0) |
| 2022 | → Saltash United (loan) | 5 | (0) |
| 2022 | → Weymouth (loan) | 1 | (0) |
| 2023 | → Tiverton Town (loan) | 21 | (2) |
| 2023 | → Weston-super-Mare (loan) | 5 | (0) |
| 2023–2024 | → Dorchester Town (loan) | 26 | (0) |
| 2024 | → Yeovil Town (loan) | 2 | (1) |
| 2025 | → Bath City (loan) | 1 | (0) |
| 2025 | → Chippenham Town (loan) | 2 | (0) |
| 2025–2026 | → Torquay United (loan) | 1 | (0) |

International career^{‡}
| 2025– | Wales U21 | 6 | (0) |
- * Club domestic league appearances and goals as of 12:29, 6 September 2026 (UTC) ‡ National team caps and goals as of 08:56, 8 October 2026 (UTC)

Edward George Martin James is a professional footballer who plays as a defender for EFL League Two club Exeter City. He is a Wales under-21 international.

== Career ==
James made his senior debut for Exeter City on 4 October 2022, in a 2–1 win over Southampton U21 at St James Park in the group stages of the EFL Trophy. James appeared in his inaugural EFL fixture on the 15 October 2022 as a substitute in a 2–4 defeat to Oxford United. On 30 October 2022, he joined National League South side Weymouth on a work experience loan until December 2022. He subsequently joined Tiverton Town in January 2023 on a further work experience loan.

In July 2023, James signed for newly promoted National Super League club Weston-super-Mare on a season-long loan deal alongside Exeter teammate Harry Lee.

In February 2025, James joined National League South side Bath City on loan for the remainder of the season.

On 16 April 2026, James signed a new one-year deal with Exeter City, with a club option for a one-year extension.

== Career statistics ==
As of match played 5 September 2026

Appearances and goals by club, season and competition
| Club | Season | League | | | FA Cup | | EFL Cup | | Other | | Total | |
| Club | Season | Division | Apps | Goals | Apps | Goals | Apps | Goals | Apps | Goals | Apps | Goals |
|---|---|---|---|---|---|---|---|---|---|---|---|---|
| Exeter City | 2022–23 | League One | 1 | 0 | 0 | 0 | 0 | 0 | 2 (Note: Appearance(s) in EFL Trophy) | 0 | 3 | 0 |
| Exeter City | 2023–24 | League One | 0 | 0 | 0 | 0 | 0 | 0 | 1 | 0 | 1 | 0 |
| Exeter City | 2024–25 | League One | 0 | 0 | 0 | 0 | 0 | 0 | 3 | 0 | 3 | 0 |
| Exeter City | 2025–26 | League One | 5 | 0 | 0 | 0 | 1 | 0 | 0 | 0 | 6 | 0 |
| Exeter City | 2026–27 | League Two | 5 | 0 | 0 | 0 | 1 | 0 | 0 | 0 | 6 | 0 |
| Exeter City | Total | | 11 | 0 | 0 | 0 | 2 | 0 | 6 | 0 | 19 | 0 |
| Saltash United (loan) | 2022–23 | Western League; Premier Division | 5 | 0 | 0 | 0 | — | | 0 | 0 | 5 | 0 |
| Weymouth (loan) | 2022–23 | National League South | 1 | 0 | 0 | 0 | — | | 1 (Note: Appearance in FA Trophy) | 0 | 2 | 0 |
| Tiverton Town (loan) | 2022–23 | Southern League; Premier Division South | 21 | 2 | — | | — | | 3 (Note: Appearances in Devon St Lukes Challenge Cup) | 0 | 24 | 2 |
| Weston-super-Mare (loan) | 2023–24 | National League South | 5 | 0 | 1 | 0 | — | | 0 | 0 | 6 | 0 |
| Dorchester Town (loan) | 2023–24 | Southern League; Premier Division South | 26 | 0 | — | | — | | 0 | 0 | 26 | 0 |
| Yeovil Town (loan) | 2024–25 | National League | 2 | 1 | — | | — | | 0 | 0 | 2 | 1 |
| Bath City (loan) | 2024–25 | National League South | 1 | 0 | — | | — | | 0 | 0 | 1 | 0 |
| Chippenham Town (loan) | 2025–26 | National League South | 2 | 0 | — | | — | | 0 | 0 | 2 | 0 |
| Torquay United (loan) | 2025–26 | National League South | 1 | 0 | — | | — | | 0 | 0 | 1 | 0 |
| Career total | | | 75 | 3 | 1 | 0 | 2 | 0 | 10 | 0 | 88 | 3 |
