= Alfie Clark =

English footballer (born 2000)

Personal information
- Date of birth: 13 December 2004 (age 21)
- Place of birth: Taunton
- Height: 5”11
- Position: Right wing

Team information
- Current team: Wells City FC

College career
Years	Team	Apps	(Gls)
2023	Floridan Atlantic University	7	

Senior career*
Years	Team	Apps	(Gls)
2021-2023	Exeter City FC	5	(0)
2023-2024	Bideford FC	15	(2)
Street FC	Street FC	20	(2)
- * Club domestic league appearances and goals

Alfie Clark (born 13 December 2004) is an English professional footballer who plays as a midfielder for Southern League Division One South club Bideford.

== Career ==
Clark joined Exeter City from Southern League Division One South side Larkhall Athletic. He made his senior debut for the club on 18 October 2022, after coming on as a 46th-minute substitute for Timothée Dieng in a 4–1 defeat at Forest Green Rovers in the group stages of the EFL Trophy.

Clark departed Exeter at the end of the 2022–23 season having been offered a scholarship with Florida Atlantic University, studying Psychology.

In January 2024, he returned to England and joined Southern League Division One South club Bideford.

== Career statistics ==
As of match played 18 October 2022

Appearances and goals by club, season and competition
Club	Season	League			FA Cup		EFL Cup		Other		Total	
Club	Season	Division	Apps	Goals	Apps	Goals	Apps	Goals	Apps	Goals	Apps	Goals
Exeter City	2022–23	Papa Johns Trophy	0	0	0	0	0	0	1 (Note: Appearance in the EFL Trophy)	0	1	0
Bideford FC	2023-2024	Southern League Divison One	15	2								
Street	2024-2025	Southern League Division One	20	0								
Bristol Manor Farm	2025-2025	Southern League Division One	10	1								
Career total			0	0	0	0	0	0	1	0	1	0
