= Pedro Borges =

Portuguese footballer (born 2005)

Pedro Elawar
Personal information
- Full name: Pedro Elawar Felix Gonçalves Borges
- Date of birth: 23 July 2005 (age 21)
- Place of birth: Portugal
- Height: 1.88 m (6 ft 2 in)
- Position: Midfielder

Team information
- Current team: Bath City (on loan from Exeter City)

Youth career
- 2014–2015: SC Coimbrões
- 2015–2019: Boavista
- 2019–2020: Bessa FC
- 2021: Yeovil Town

Senior career*
Years	Team	Apps	(Gls)
2021–2022	Yeovil Town	0	(0)
2022–	Exeter City	9	(0)
2022	→ Plymouth Parkway (loan)	1	(0)
2023	→ Tiverton Town (loan)	4	(0)
2023	→ Dorchester Town (loan)	8	(0)
2024	→ Gosport Borough (loan)	6	(0)
2024–2025	→ Yeovil Town (loan)	8	(0)
2025	→ Weston-super-Mare (loan)	11	(2)
2026–	→ Bath City (loan)	10	(0)
- * Club domestic league appearances and goals as of 21:07, 1 November 2026 (UTC)

Pedro Elawar Felix Gonçalves Borges (born 23 July 2005) is a Portuguese professional footballer who plays as a midfielder for Southern League Premier Division South club Bath City on loan from Exeter City.

== Career ==
Elawar joined the youth system of National League side Yeovil Town in 2021. Borges made two first team appearances for Yeovil Town in their Somerset Premier Cup victories against Bridgwater United and Larkhall Athletic.

Elawar was a trialist at Exeter City in the Devon Bowl game at Axminster in January 2022. He made his senior debut for the club on 30 August 2022, after coming on as an 84th-minute substitute for Harry Kite in a 2–1 defeat to Newport County at St James Park in the group stages of the EFL Trophy. On 22 September 2022, he joined Southern League Premier Division South side Plymouth Parkway on a one-month loan, alongside teammate Harrison King. On 7 March 2023, Elawar joined Southern League Premier Division South side Tiverton Town on loan. Elawar was recalled from his loan at Tiverton Town on the 7 April 2023. On the same date, Elawar made his inaugural EFL appearance as a substitute in a 0–1 defeat to Bolton Wanderers.

In October 2023, Elawar joined Dorchester Town on loan until January 2024. On 31 December 2023, Elawar was recalled from his loan by Exeter City.

On 5 November 2024, Elawar re-joined National League side Yeovil Town on loan until January 2025. On 14 January 2025, Borges was recalled from his loan by Exeter City. On 16 January 2025, Elawar joined National League South side Weston-super-Mare on loan until the end of the 2024–25 season.

On 28 August 2026, Elawar joined National League South side Bath City on a three-month loan deal.

== Career statistics ==
As of match played 31 October 2026

Appearances and goals by club, season and competition
Club	Season	League			FA Cup		EFL Cup		Other		Total	
Club	Season	Division	Apps	Goals	Apps	Goals	Apps	Goals	Apps	Goals	Apps	Goals
Yeovil Town	2021–22	National League	0	0	0	0	—		2 (Note: Appearance(s) in Somerset Premier Cup)	0	2	0
Exeter City	2021–22	League Two	0	0	0	0	0	0	0	0	0	0
Exeter City	2022–23	League One	5	0	0	0	0	0	2 (Note: Appearances in EFL Trophy)	0	7	0
Exeter City	2023–24	League One	3	0	0	0	1	0	2	0	6	0
Exeter City	2024–25	League One	1	0	0	0	1	0	2	0	4	0
Exeter City	2025–26	League One	0	0	0	0	0	0	0	0	0	0
Exeter City	2026–27	League Two	0	0	0	0	0	0	0	0	0	0
Exeter City	Total		9	0	0	0	2	0	6	0	17	0
Plymouth Parkway (loan)	2022–23	Southern League; Premier Division South	1	0	—		—		1 (Note: Appearance in FA Trophy)	0	2	0
Tiverton Town (loan)	2022–23	Southern League; Premier Division South	4	0	—		—		—		4	0
Dorchester Town (loan)	2023–24	Southern League; Premier Division South	8	0	—		—		—		8	0
Gosport Borough (loan)	2023–24	Southern League; Premier Division South	6	0	—		—		—		6	0
Yeovil Town (loan)	2024–25	National League	8	0	—		—		1	0	9	0
Weston-super-Mare (loan)	2024–25	National League South	11	2	—		—		2	0	13	2
Bath City (loan)	2026–27	Southern League; Premier Division South	10	0	1	0	—		3 (Note: Two appearances in FA Trophy, one appearance in Somerset Premier Cup)	0	14	0
Career total			57	2	1	0	2	0	15	0	75	2
