= Kyle Taylor =

English footballer (born 1999)

Personal information
- Full name: Kyle Frazer Taylor
- Date of birth: 28 August 1999 (age 27)
- Place of birth: Richterswil, Switzerland
- Height: 5 ft 6 in (1.67 m)
- Position: Midfielder

Youth career
- 2007–2017: AFC Bournemouth

Senior career*
Years	Team	Apps	(Gls)
2017–2021	AFC Bournemouth	0	(0)
2019–2020	→ Forest Green Rovers (loan)	6	(0)
2020–2021	→ Southend United (loan)	31	(1)
2021–2024	Exeter City	38	(1)
- * Club domestic league appearances and goals as of 10:59, 21 July 2024 (UTC)

Kyle Frazer Taylor (born 26 May 1999) is an English professional footballer who last played as a midfielder for EFL League Two club Exeter City.

== Career ==
=== AFC Bournemouth ===
After signing for Bournemouth as a schoolboy, Taylor signed a six-year youth contract with the club aged 12. Taylor made his professional debut for Bournemouth on 17 January 2018, coming on in the 87th minute for Andrew Surman in a 3–0 defeat to Wigan Athletic in the third round of the FA Cup. In February 2018, Taylor signed a new deal at Bournemouth, which contracted him to the club until June 2020. Taylor made his second appearance, and full debut, for Bournemouth on 5 January 2019, playing the first 45 minutes of a 1–3 FA Cup home defeat to Brighton & Hove Albion, before being replaced by David Brooks.

==== Loan to Forest Green Rovers ====
On 30 August 2019, he joined Forest Green Rovers on a season-long loan. On 6 January 2020, Taylor was recalled from his loan spell with Forest Green Rovers, having made a total of 10 appearances across all competitions.

==== Loan to Southend United ====
On 25 September 2020, Taylor joined League Two side Southend United on loan until January 2021. On 12 January 2021, it was announced that Taylor's loan with Southend United had been extended until the end of the 2020–21 season.

== Personal life ==
Taylor was born in Switzerland. He is the half-brother of the English comedian Paul Taylor.

== Career statistics ==
As of match played 13 April 2024

Appearances and goals by club, season and competition
Club	Season	League			FA Cup		EFL Cup		Other		Total	
Club	Season	Division	Apps	Goals	Apps	Goals	Apps	Goals	Apps	Goals	Apps	Goals
AFC Bournemouth	2017–18	Premier League	0	0	1	0	0	0	—		1	0
AFC Bournemouth	2018–19	Premier League	0	0	1	0	0	0	—		1	0
AFC Bournemouth	2019–20	Premier League	0	0	0	0	0	0	—		0	0
AFC Bournemouth	2020–21	Championship	0	0	0	0	0	0	—		0	0
AFC Bournemouth	Total		0	0	2	0	0	0	—		2	0
Forest Green Rovers (loan)	2019–20	League Two	6	0	2	0	0	0	2 (Note: Appearances in EFL Trophy)	0	10	0
Southend United (loan)	2020–21	League Two	31	1	0	0	0	0	0	0	31	1
Exeter City	2021–22	League Two	14	1	2	0	1	0	2	0	19	1
Exeter City	2022–23	League One	0	0	0	0	0	0	0	0	0	0
Exeter City	2023–24	League One	24	0	1	0	4	1	3	0	32	1
Exeter City	Total		38	1	3	0	5	1	5	0	51	2
Career total			75	2	7	0	5	1	7	0	94	3

== Honours ==
Exeter City

- League Two runner-up: 2021–22
