= Reece Cole =

English footballer (born 1998)

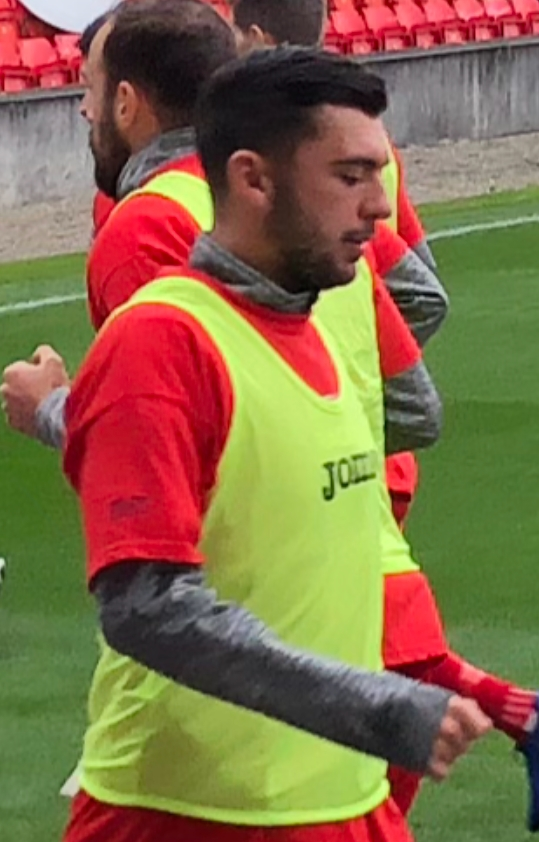
- Cole warming up with Partick Thistle in October 2019

Personal information
- Full name: Reece George Cole
- Date of birth: 17 February 1998 (age 28)
- Place of birth: Hillingdon, England
- Height: 5 ft 10 in (1.78 m)
- Position: Central midfielder

Team information
- Current team: Exeter City
- Number: 12

Youth career
- –2012: Hayes & Yeading United
- 2012–2016: Brentford

Senior career*
Years	Team	Apps	(Gls)
2016–2020	Brentford	1	(0)
2017–2018	→ Newport County (loan)	4	(1)
2018	→ Yeovil Town (loan)	1	(0)
2018–2019	→ Maidenhead United (loan)	6	(1)
2019	→ Macclesfield Town (loan)	18	(1)
2019–2020	→ Partick Thistle (loan)	19	(2)
2021	Queens Park Rangers	0	(0)
2021–2022	Dunfermline Athletic	10	(1)
2022	Chertsey Town	5	(3)
2022–2023	Hayes & Yeading United	23	(2)
2023–	Exeter City	108	(19)
- * Club domestic league appearances and goals as of 00:24, 5 November 2026 (UTC)

Reece George Cole (born 17 February 1998) is an English professional footballer who plays as a central midfielder for EFL League Two club Exeter City.

Cole is a graduate of the Brentford academy and made one senior appearance for the club before his release in 2020. Following spells with Queens Park Rangers U23 and Dunfermline Athletic, he dropped into non-League football in 2022. Cole returned to professional football with Exeter City in 2023.

== Career ==
=== Brentford ===
Cole began his youth career in the Hayes & Yeading United youth system, before transferring to Brentford at age 14. He was a part of the U15 team which emerged victorious in the Junior category at the 2012 Milk Cup. Cole made 8 appearances for the U18 team before signing a scholarship deal at the end of the 2013–14 season. He made 32 appearances and scored seven goals during his two-year scholarship and increasingly became part of the Development Squad during the 2015–16 season, progressing sufficiently to sign a professional contract in February 2016. Cole was an unused substitute during a number of late-season first team matches in April 2016.

Whilst a regular for the B team, Cole received sporadic calls into the first team squad during the 2016–17 season, before making his senior debut as a late substitute for Nico Yennaris in a 3–2 victory over Nottingham Forest on 7 March 2017. One month later, he signed a new three-year contract. Cole won further attention with long-range goals in pre-season friendly wins over Aldershot Town and Oxford United in July 2017, before departing to join League Two club Newport County on loan until January 2018. He made his debut versus Coventry City 9 days later and scored the first senior goal of his career with the only goal of the game. Cole made four further appearances and returned to Brentford in late September 2017, after suffering a knee injury. He returned to match play with the B team in December, but did not win any further calls into the first team squad before the end of the season.

Cole spent much of the remainder of his contract away on loan with League Two, National League and Scottish Championship clubs Yeovil Town, Maidenhead United, Macclesfield Town and Partick Thistle. He gained significant game time at the latter two clubs, in particular scoring four goals in a five-match spell during November 2019, which saw him win the Partick Thistle Player of the Month award. Cole was released by Brentford in June 2020.

=== Queens Park Rangers ===
On 15 March 2021, Cole signed a short-term contract with the U23 team at Championship club Queens Park Rangers on a free transfer. He failed to win a call into the first team squad before the end of the season and was released when his contract expired.

=== Dunfermline Athletic ===
On 20 July 2021, Cole signed a one-year contract with Scottish Championship club Dunfermline Athletic on a free transfer. After featuring predominantly as a substitute during the early months of the season, Cole undertook extra fitness training at the Joe Cardle Academy. On his 12th and final appearance of a 2021–22 season which culminated in relegation to the Scottish League One, Cole scored his only goal for the club in a 2–1 victory over Ayr United on 16 April 2022. Cole was released at the end of the season and remarked in July 2023 that he fell out of love with football during the latter stages his time with the club.

=== Non-League football ===
Seeking to play part-time football, Cole dropped into non-League football and began the 2022–23 season with Isthmian League South Central Division club Chertsey Town. He scored three goals in his first seven appearances for the club, before departing to rejoin Southern League Premier Division South club Hayes & Yeading United in October 2022. He made 27 appearances and scored five goals during a 2022–23 season in which the club won the Middlesex Senior Cup. He became a free agent at the end of the season.

=== Exeter City ===
Cole joined League One club Exeter City on trial during the 2023–24 pre-season. After 2 1/2 weeks at St James Park, he signed a one-year contract, with the option of a further year, on 10 July 2023. The move reunited him with his former Partick Thistle manager Gary Caldwell. Following 17 appearances and one goal by mid-November 2023, Cole signed a new 18-month contract, with the option of a further year. Cole captained the team during three matches late in December and ended a mid-table 2023–24 season with 42 appearances and seven goals.

In July 2024, Cole signed a one-year extension to his existing contract, with the option of a further year. Three "niggly" injuries (one of which was misdiagnosed) and illness restricted him to just 13 appearances during the first half of the 2024–25 season. While lacking match fitness, Cole made regular appearances from February 2025 through to the end of the mid-table season, ending with 27 appearances and three goals. Cole made 39 appearances and scored seven goals during a 2025–26 season that culminated in relegation. The option on his contract was taken up in May 2026.

== Personal life ==
Cole attended Chalfonts Community College. While out of professional football during the 2022–23 season, Cole worked as a teacher in the London area.

== Career statistics ==
As of match played 10 August 2026

Appearances and goals by club, season and competition
Club	Season	League			National cup (Note: Includes FA Cup, Scottish Cup)		League cup (Note: Includes EFL Cup, Scottish League Cup)		Other		Total	
Club	Season	Division	Apps	Goals	Apps	Goals	Apps	Goals	Apps	Goals	Apps	Goals
Brentford	2015–16	Championship	0	0	0	0	0	0	—		0	0
Brentford	2016–17	Championship	1	0	0	0	0	0	—		1	0
Brentford	2017–18	Championship	0	0	0	0	0	0	—		0	0
Brentford	2018–19	Championship	0	0	0	0	—		—		0	0
Brentford	Total		1	0	0	0	0	0	—		1	0
Newport County (loan)	2017–18	League Two	4	1	0	0	0	0	1 (Note: Appearance(s) in EFL Trophy)	0	5	1
Yeovil Town (loan)	2018–19	League Two	1	0	—		1	0	—		2	0
Maidenhead United (loan)	2018–19	National League	6	1	—		—		0	0	6	1
Macclesfield Town (loan)	2018–19	League Two	18	1	—		—		—		18	1
Partick Thistle (loan)	2019–20	Scottish Championship	19	2	2	1	1	0	3 (Note: Appearances in Scottish Challenge Cup)	1	25	4
Dunfermline Athletic	2021–22	Scottish Championship	10	1	0	0	2	0	0	0	12	1
Chertsey Town	2022–23	Isthmian League South Central Division	5	3	1	0	—		1 (Note: Appearance in FA Trophy)	0	7	3
Hayes & Yeading United	2022–23	Southern League Premier Division South	23	2	—		—		4 (Note: Appearances in Middlesex Senior Cup)	3	27	5
Exeter City	2023–24	League One	39	7	0	0	3	0	0	0	42	7
Exeter City	2024–25	League One	22	3	2	0	1	0	2	0	27	3
Exeter City	2025–26	League One	35	7	2	0	0	0	2	0	39	7
Exeter City	2026–27	League Two	0	0	0	0	1	0	0	0	1	0
Exeter City	Total		96	17	4	0	5	0	4	0	109	17
Career total			183	28	7	1	9	0	13	4	212	33

== Honours ==
Hayes & Yeading United

- Middlesex Senior Cup: 2022–23

Individual

- Partick Thistle Player of the Month: November 2019
- Exeter City Player of the Month: February 2024
- EFL League One Goal of the Month: April 2025
