= Will Aimson =

English footballer (born 1994)

Personal information
- Full name: William Stewart Aimson
- Date of birth: 3 June 1994 (age 32)
- Place of birth: Christchurch, England
- Height: 6 ft 1 in (1.86 m)
- Positions: Defender; defensive midfielder

Team information
- Current team: Salford
- Number: 4

Youth career
- –2012: Eastleigh
- 2012–2014: Hull City

Senior career*
Years	Team	Apps	(Gls)
2012	Eastleigh	1	(0)
2014–2016	Hull City	0	(0)
2014	→ Tamworth (loan)	3	(0)
2014	→ Tranmere Rovers (loan)	2	(0)
2015–2016	→ Blackpool (loan)	5	(0)
2016–2018	Blackpool	45	(0)
2018–2019	Bury	37	(4)
2019–2021	Plymouth Argyle	45	(2)
2021–2023	Bolton Wanderers	36	(1)
2023–2024	Exeter City	54	(5)
2024–2026	Wigan Athletic	83	(1)
2026–	Salford	13	(1)
- * Club domestic league appearances and goals as of 31 October 2026 (UTC)

William Stewart Aimson (born 3 June 1994) is an English professional footballer who plays as a defender for EFL League Two club Salford City.

== Club career ==
=== Hull City ===
Aimson started his career at Eastleigh and at age 17, he joined Hull City after he made an impression on a trial there. On 1 March 2014, Aimson joined Conference Premier side Tamworth on loan. Aimson immediately went straight to the squad and made his debut, in a 2–0 loss against FC Halifax Town. Aimson went on to make two more appearances for the club.

Aimson joined Tranmere Rovers on loan in November 2014 from Hull City. He made his Football League debut against Southend United at Prenton Park in a 1–2 League Two defeat on 22 November 2014. Aimson broke his tibia and fibula playing against Portsmouth on 29 November after a collision with his teammate Danny Holmes.

=== Blackpool ===
In November 2015, Aimson joined League One side Blackpool on a one-month loan deal, though this was later extended to 9 January 2016. In the January transfer window 2016 Aimson was permanently moved to Blackpool for an undisclosed fee. Aimson was released by Blackpool at the end of the 2017–18 season.

=== Bury ===
On 21 June 2018, he signed a two-year contract with Bury, following in the footsteps of his grandfather Paul, who spent a year with the Shakers during his own playing career. Aimson announced he was leaving Bury on 1 July 2019, calling the reasons for his departure "out of my hands".

=== Plymouth Argyle ===
On 2 July 2019, he joined up with his former manager at Bury, Ryan Lowe, when he signed for Plymouth Argyle. He scored his first two goals for the club in a 2–2 draw at home to Scunthorpe United.

=== Bolton Wanderers ===
On 16 June 2021, it was announced he would sign for Bolton Wanderers on a two-year contract. Due to injury, his debut didn't come until 5 October when he played 90 minutes in a 4–1 win against Liverpool U21 in the EFL Trophy. Aimson made his league debut for the club on 23 October, replacing George Johnston as a half time substitute in a 2–2 draw at home against Gillingham. He scored his first goal for the club in a 2–1 win against Charlton Athletic on 8 February 2022.

=== Exeter City ===
As his contract with Bolton was due to expire at the end of the 2022–23 season, on 27 January 2023 Aimson officially signed for fellow League One side Exeter City for an undisclosed fee, penning a two-and-a-half-year contract with the club.

=== Wigan Athletic ===
On 15 July 2024, Aimson joined League One club Wigan Athletic on a two-year deal for an undisclosed fee. He made his debut for the club on 10 August 2024, in a 1–0 defeat to Charlton Athletic. He scored his first goal for the club on 6 December 2025, in a 2–2 draw with Barrow in the FA Cup which Wigan won on penalties.

On 6 May 2026, it was announced that Aimson would leave the club on expiry of his contract.

=== Salford City ===
On 23 June 2026, Aimson signed for EFL League Two side Salford City on a two-year contract. He made his debut for the club on 8 August 2026, in a 1–1 draw with Shrewsbury Town which Salford lost on penalties and where he was also sent off. He scored his first goal for the club on 31 October 2026, in a 2–1 win against his former club Exeter City.

== Personal life ==
Aimson's late grandfather was Paul Aimson and was pupil at Highcliffe Senior School. Will excelled in golf and had a category one handicap (5) but chose football.

== Career statistics ==
As of match played 31 October 2026

Appearances and goals by club, season and competition
Club	Season	League			FA Cup		League Cup		Other		Total	
Club	Season	Division	Apps	Goals	Apps	Goals	Apps	Goals	Apps	Goals	Apps	Goals
Eastleigh	2011–12	Conference South	1	0	0	0	—		0	0	1	0
Hull City	2012–13	Championship	0	0	0	0	0	0	0	0	0	0
Hull City	2013–14	Premier League	0	0	0	0	0	0	0	0	0	0
Hull City	2014–15	Premier League	0	0	0	0	0	0	0	0	0	0
Hull City	2015–16	Championship	0	0	0	0	0	0	0	0	0	0
Hull City	Total		0	0	0	0	0	0	0	0	0	0
Tamworth (loan)	2013–14	Conference Premier	3	0	0	0	—		0	0	3	0
Tranmere Rovers (loan)	2014–15	League Two	2	0	0	0	0	0	0	0	2	0
Blackpool	2015–16 (Note: Part of this season was on loan)	League One	15	0	0	0	0	0	1 (Note: Appearances in EFL Trophy)	0	16	0
Blackpool	2016–17	League Two	18	0	3	0	2	0	8 (Note: Five appearances in EFL Trophy, three appearances in EFL League Two play-offs.)	0	31	0
Blackpool	2017–18	League One	17	0	1	0	1	0	3	0	22	0
Blackpool	Total		50	0	4	0	3	0	12	0	69	0
Bury	2018–19	League Two	37	4	1	0	1	0	4	0	43	4
Plymouth Argyle	2019–20	League Two	5	2	0	0	0	0	2	0	7	2
Plymouth Argyle	2020–21	League One	40	0	3	0	2	0	1	0	46	0
Plymouth Argyle	Total		45	2	3	0	2	0	3	0	53	2
Bolton Wanderers	2021–22	League One	25	1	1	0	0	0	2	0	28	1
Bolton Wanderers	2022–23	League One	11	0	0	0	2	0	4	0	17	0
Bolton Wanderers	Total		36	1	1	0	2	0	6	0	45	1
Exeter City	2022–23	League One	18	0	0	0	0	0	0	0	18	0
Exeter City	2023–24	League One	36	5	1	0	4	0	2	0	43	5
Exeter City	Total		54	5	1	0	4	0	2	0	61	5
Wigan Athletic	2024–25	League One	43	0	2	0	1	0	2	0	48	0
Wigan Athletic	2025–26	League One	43	1	4	1	2	0	1	0	50	2
Wigan Athletic	Total		86	1	6	1	3	0	3	0	98	2
Salford City	2026–27	League Two	13	1	0	0	1	0	1	0	15	1
Career total			326	14	16	1	16	0	31	0	389	15

== Honours ==
Blackpool

- EFL League Two play-offs: 2017

Bury

- EFL League Two second-place promotion: 2018–19
