= Vincent Harper =

Kenyan footballer (born 2000)

Personal information
- Full name: Vincent McDyess Harper
- Date of birth: 22 September 2000 (age 26)
- Place of birth: Nairobi, Kenya
- Height: 1.74 m (5 ft 9 in)
- Positions: Left-back; left wing-back

Team information
- Current team: Exeter City (on loan from Walsall)

Youth career
- –2019: Bristol City

Senior career*
| Years | Team | Apps | (Gls) |
| 2019–2021 | Bristol City | 0 | (0) |
| 2019 | → Gloucester City (loan) | 15 | (1) |
| 2019 | → Weston-super-Mare (loan) | 3 | (0) |
| 2020 | → Bath City (loan) | 2 | (0) |
| 2021 | Chippenham Town | 3 | (0) |
| 2021–2023 | Eastleigh | 69 | (5) |
| 2023–2025 | Exeter City | 53 | (2) |
| 2025– | Walsall | 17 | (0) |
| 2026– | → Exeter City (loan) | 0 | (0) |

International career^{‡}
| 2023 | England C | 1 | (0) |
| 2025– | Kenya | 1 | (0) |
- * Club domestic league appearances and goals as of 10:30, 5 January 2026 (UTC) ‡ National team caps and goals as of 22:17, 9 October 2025 (UTC)

Vincent McDyess Harper (born 22 September 2000) is a Kenyan professional footballer who plays as a left-back or left wing-back for EFL League Two club Exeter City, on loan from EFL League Two side Walsall, and the Kenya national team.

== Personal life ==
Born in Nairobi, Kenya, Harper moved to England when he was a toddler. He holds a dual citizenship.

== Club career ==
=== Bristol City ===
Harper joined Bristol City and progressed through their youth ranks. Impressing at under-16 level, he was promoted to the under-18s, where he scored two goals on debut. Harper would sign his first professional contract in May 2019. Following three loan spells, Harper was released at the end of the 2020–21 season.

==== Loan spells ====
On 31 July 2019, Harper joined National League North side, Gloucester City on loan. Harper would score one goal for the club, scoring a consolation goal in a 5–1 defeat to Spennymoor Town. Harper would make 15 league appearances for Gloucester, before returning to Bristol in December.

On 10 December 2019, Harper joined Southern Football League side, Weston-super-Mare on a one-month loan deal. He made three appearances for the club. Following the conclusion of the loan deal, Harper joined Bath City on a loan deal until the end of the season. He was recalled 21 February 2020, after only playing two games – a 1–0 victory to Concord Rangers, and a 0–0 draw to Dorking Wanderers.

=== Chippenham Town ===
On 20 August 2021, Harper joined National League North side, Chippenham Town, following a successful trial during pre-season. He would make his league debut for Chippenham in a 1–0 victory to Slough Town. Having only been at Chippenham for a month, Harper was subject to a seven-day approach from Eastleigh.

=== Eastleigh ===
On 7 September 2021, Harper joined National League side, Eastleigh on a permanent deal. Eastleigh had begun monitoring Harper after he impressed in his trial game at Chippenham, which was against Eastleigh. Harper would make his debut in the next game, coming off the bench in the 63rd minute in a 1–1 draw to Barnet. Quickly establishing himself as a starter, he would score his first goal for Eastleigh in a 3–3 draw against King's Lynn Town. The struggling Eastleigh side would finish 19th, two places away from relegation, with Harper featuring in 36 games.

The following season, Harper would maintain his place in the starting eleven. Harper would come on as a 67th-minute substitute against Scunthorpe United and score both goals in a 2–0 victory. He would score again in the following league game – a 5–2 victory against Maidstone United. Harper would feature 33 times in the league as Eastleigh finished ninth, two positions away from the play-offs.

=== Exeter City ===
On 21 June 2023, Harper would join League One side, Exeter City on a two-year deal with an option for an additional third year. The signing was funded by the 1931 Fund, a group who pay money each month to raise around £15,000 to sign a player and part-fund them for a season. Harper would make his debut for Exeter, coming on as a substitute in the 16th minute for the injured Demetri Mitchell, in a 3–0 victory against Wycombe Wanderers.

On 5 May 2025, Exeter announced the player would leave the club in June when his contract expired.

=== Walsall ===
On 26 June 2025, Harper signed for League Two team Walsall on a two-year contract with an option of a further year. On 14 August 2026, Harper returned to Exeter City on loan for the season.

== International career ==
Having been born in Kenya, but moving to England at a young age, Harper is eligible to play for both the Kenya national team and the England national team. In an interview in 2018, Harper said it would be a case of which football association asked him to represent first.

In March 2023, Harper was included in Paul Fairclough's provisional 25-man England C squad. On 21 March 2023, he played the full 90 minutes in England C's 1–0 victory against Wales C.

On 9 October 2025, Harper made his senior international debut for Kenya, playing the first half of a 2026 World Cup qualifier victory over Burundi.

== Career statistics ==
As of match played May 2025

| Club | Season | League | | | FA Cup | | League Cup | | Other | | Total | |
| Club | Season | Division | Apps | Goals | Apps | Goals | Apps | Goals | Apps | Goals | Apps | Goals |
|---|---|---|---|---|---|---|---|---|---|---|---|---|
| Bristol City | 2019–20 | EFL Championship | 0 | 0 | 0 | 0 | 0 | 0 | 0 | 0 | 0 | 0 |
| Bristol City | 2020–21 | EFL Championship | 0 | 0 | 0 | 0 | 0 | 0 | 0 | 0 | 0 | 0 |
| Bristol City | Total | | 0 | 0 | 0 | 0 | 0 | 0 | 0 | 0 | 0 | 0 |
| Gloucester City (loan) | 2019–20 | National League North | 15 | 1 | 0 | 0 | — | | 0 | 0 | 15 | 1 |
| Weston-super-Mare (loan) | 2019–20 | Southern Football League | 3 | 0 | 0 | 0 | — | | 0 | 0 | 3 | 0 |
| Bath City (loan) | 2019–20 | National League South | 2 | 0 | 0 | 0 | — | | 0 | 0 | 2 | 0 |
| Chippenham Town | 2021–22 | National League South | 3 | 0 | 0 | 0 | — | | 0 | 0 | 3 | 0 |
| Eastleigh | 2021–22 | National League | 36 | 1 | 3 | 0 | — | | 2 (Note: Appearances in FA Trophy) | 0 | 41 | 1 |
| Eastleigh | 2022–23 | National League | 33 | 4 | 1 | 0 | — | | 3 | 0 | 37 | 4 |
| Eastleigh | Total | | 69 | 5 | 4 | 0 | — | | 5 | 0 | 78 | 5 |
| Exeter City | 2023–24 | EFL League One | 31 | 1 | 1 | 0 | 4 | 0 | 1 (Note: Appearances in EFL Trophy) | 0 | 37 | 1 |
| Exeter City | 2024–25 | EFL League One | 22 | 1 | 3 | 1 | 1 | 0 | 2 | 0 | 28 | 2 |
| Exeter City | Total | | 53 | 2 | 4 | 1 | 5 | 0 | 3 | 0 | 65 | 3 |
| Career total | | | 145 | 8 | 8 | 1 | 5 | 0 | 8 | 0 | 166 | 9 |
