= Sunny Singh Gill =

English association football referee

- Full name: Sunny Singh Gill
- Other occupation: Former prison officer

Domestic
Years	League	Role
2024–	Premier League	Referee

Sunny Singh Gill is an English football referee and former prison officer who became the first British South Asian referee in the Premier League in March 2024. In March 2023 he became the first British Asian referee in the English Football League since his father.

His father Jarnail Singh and brother Bhupinder Singh Gill have also served as football officials.

== Honours ==
Gill won the 'Sports Personality of the Year Award' at the 2025 Asian Achievers Awards for his contribution to football officiating and representation in professional sports.
