= 2026–27 Plymouth Argyle F.C. season =

Plymouth Argyle
2026–27 season
- Owner & Chairman: Simon Hallett
- Head coach: Tom Cleverley
- Stadium: Home Park

The 2026–27 season is the 141st season in the history of Plymouth Argyle Football Club and their second consecutive season being in League One. In addition to the domestic league, the club also participates in the FA Cup, the EFL Cup, and the EFL Trophy.

== Transfers and contracts ==
=== In ===
Date	Pos.	Player	From	Fee	Ref.
26 June 2026	GK	(Republic of Ireland) James Storer	(England) Wolverhampton Wanderers	Free transfer	
1 July 2026 (Note: The transfer was announced on 15 June, and would become official on July 1 once Harding's contract at Millwall expired.)	CB	(Jamaica) Wes Harding	(England) Millwall	Free	
1 July 2026 (Note: The transfer was announced on 3 June, and would become official on July 1 once Hartridge's contract at Burton Albion expired.)	CB	(England) Alex Hartridge	(England) Burton Albion	Free	
1 July 2026 (Note: The transfer was announced on 29 June, and would become official on July 1 once White's contract at Stevenage expired.)	CDM	(England) Harvey White	(England) Stevenage	Free	
14 July 2026	GK	(England) Murphy Cooper	(England) Queens Park Rangers	£250,000 (Note: A potential further £250,000 in add-ons.)	
23 July 2026	CB	(England) Alex Mitchell	(England) Charlton Athletic	£250,000	
7 August 2026	CF	(Wales) Will Evans	(England) Mansfield Town	£400,000	

=== Loans in ===
Date	Pos.	Player	From	Loaned until	Ref.
24 August 2026	CDM	(England) Tyreeq Bakinson	(England) Leyton Orient	End of Season	
24 August 2026	RW	(England) Oliver Irow	(England) Tottenham Hotspur	End of Season	

=== Loans out ===
Date	Pos.	Player	To	Loaned until	Ref.
28 August 2026	GK	(England) Leo McCormick	(England) Plymouth Parkway	28 September 2026	
7 September 2026	LM	(England) Tegan Finn	(England) Torquay United	11 January 2027 (Note: On 8 October, Finn's initial one-month loan at Torquay was extended for a further month. On 5 November, it was extended further until mid-January.)	
7 September 2026	CM	(England) Caleb Roberts	(England) Torquay United	2 January 2027	
10 September 2026	LW	(Wales) Freddie Issaka	(England) Gateshead	10 January 2027	
10 October 2026	GK	(England) Leo McCormick	(England) Malvern Town	10 November 2026	

=== Out ===
Date	Pos.	Player	To	Fee	Ref.
20 July 2026	CF	(Switzerland) Lorent Tolaj	(England) Bristol City	£4,000,000	
21 August 2026	CB	(England) Brendan Wiredu	(England) Salford City	Undisclosed	

=== Released / out of contract ===
Date	Pos.	Player	Subsequent club	Join date	Ref.
30 June 2026	GK	(England) Zak Baker	(England) Torquay United	1 July 2026	
30 June 2026	RB	(England) Malachi Davy	(England) Falmouth Town	1 July 2026	
30 June 2026	GK	(England) Jack Flower	(United States) Cleary Cougars	1 July 2026	
30 June 2026	GK	(Northern Ireland) Conor Hazard	(England) Wycombe Wanderers	1 July 2026	
30 June 2026	CM	(England) Oscar Dean	(United States) Siena Saints	10 July 2026	
30 June 2026	LB	(England) Nathanael Ogbeta	(Portugal) Marítimo	13 July 2026	
30 June 2026	GK	(England) Luca Ashby-Hammond	(England) Stockport County	31 July 2026	
30 June 2026	CF	(Wales) Joe Hatch	(England) Barnstaple Town	31 July 2026	
30 June 2026	CB	(England) Sam Lord	(England) Taunton Town	4 August 2026	
30 June 2026	RB	(England) Harry Shield	(England) Torquay United	4 August 2026	
30 June 2026	CAM	(England) Jamie Paterson	(England) Rochdale	23 October 2026	
30 June 2026	CM	(England) Ayman Benarous	(England) Crawley Town	10 November 2026	
30 June 2026	CF	(England) Kian Burch			
30 June 2026	CB	(England) Lewis Flowers			
30 June 2026	CB	(Zimbabwe) Brendan Galloway			
30 June 2026	CB	(England) Toby Haley			
30 June 2026	CB	(England) Jack Matthews			
30 June 2026	CF	(England) Fletcher Poole			
30 June 2026	CAM	(England) Lewis Thomas			
30 June 2026	CM	(England) Callum Wright			

=== New contracts ===
Date	Pos.	Player	Contract expiry	Ref.
26 May 2026	RB	(England) Joe Edwards	30 June 2027	

== Pre-season and friendlies ==
On 18 May, Argyle announced their pre-season schedule, with a training camp in Murcia, Spain between 4–9 July and fixtures against Plymouth Parkway, Bath City, Torquay United, Truro City, Bristol City and Tavistock.

Win Draw Loss Fixtures

11 July 2026 Friendly	Plymouth Parkway	1–4	Plymouth Argyle	Manadon
15:00 BST	Sullivan 32'	Report	Pepple 2'; Baidoo 44'; Oseni 46', 87'	Stadium: Bolitho Park

18 July 2026 Friendly	Bath City	0–3	Plymouth Argyle	Twerton
15:00 BST		Report	Oseni 39'; Baidoo 45'; Amaechi 53'	Stadium: Twerton Park

21 July 2026 Friendly	Torquay United	0–1	Plymouth Argyle	Torquay
19:30 BST	Sundire (yellow card) 18'; Dennis (yellow card) 87'	Report	Pepple 28'; Sorinola (yellow card) 74'	Stadium: Plainmoor

25 July 2026 Friendly	Truro City	0–1	Plymouth Argyle	Threemilestone
15:00 BST		Report	Baidoo 82'	Stadium: Truro City Stadium

1 August 2026 Friendly	Plymouth Argyle	0–0	Bristol City	Milehouse
TBC BST	Amaechi (yellow card) 61'; Ross (yellow card) 88'	Report		Stadium: Home Park; Attendance: 7,556 (854 away)

4 August 2026 Friendly	Tavistock	1–4	Plymouth Argyle	Tavistock
19:30 BST	Bowker 15'	Report	Wiredu 22', 75'; Sharpe 61'; Roberts 87'	Stadium: Langsford Park

== Competitions ==
=== Overall record ===
Competition	First match	Last match	Starting round	Final position	Record							
Competition	First match	Last match	Starting round	Final position	Pld	W	D	L	GF	GA	GD	Win %
EFL League One	August 2026	May 2027	Matchday 1	TBD	0	0	0	0	0	0	+0	—
FA Cup	November 2026	TBD	First round	TBD	0	0	0	0	0	0	+0	—
EFL Cup	August 2026	TBD	First round	TBD	0	0	0	0	0	0	+0	—
EFL Trophy	September 2026	TBD	Group stage	TBD	0	0	0	0	0	0	+0	—
Total					0	0	0	0	0	0	+0	—

Last updated: 28 February 2026
Source: Soccerway

=== EFL League One ===
==== League table ====
Pos	Team	Pld	W	D	L	GF	GA	GD	Pts	Promotion, qualification or relegation
5	Sheffield Wednesday	15	7	5	3	27	15	+12	26	Qualification for League One play-offs
6	Bradford City	14	6	5	3	12	10	+2	23	Qualification for League One play-offs
7	Plymouth Argyle	16	7	2	7	21	24	−3	23	
8	Reading	16	6	4	6	26	19	+7	22	
9	Milton Keynes Dons	15	5	7	3	29	23	+6	22	

Updated to match(es) played on 21 November 2026. Source: EFL Official Website
Rules for classification: 1) Points; 2) Goal difference; 3) Number of goals scored; 4) Head-to-head results; 5) Wins; 6) Away goals; 7) Penalty points (sec 9.5); 8) 12-point sending off offences

==== Results summary ====
Overall								Home						Away					
Pld	W	D	L	GF	GA	GD	Pts	W	D	L	GF	GA	GD	W	D	L	GF	GA	GD
15	7	2	6	21	22	−1	23	3	1	3	8	7	+1	4	1	3	13	15	−2

Last updated: 14 November 2026.
Source: Soccerway

==== Results by round ====
Round	1	2	3	4	5	6	7	8	9	10	11	12	13	14	15	16	17	18	19	20	21	22	23	24	25	26	27	28	29	30
Ground	H	A	H	A	A	H	A	H	A	H	H	A	A	H	A	H	A	H	A	H	A	H	H	A	A	H	H	A	A	H
Result	L	D	W	L	W	W	W	L	W	W	L	L	W	D	L															
Position	22	22	12	16	13	6	3	4	1	1	4	5	4	5	6															
Points	0	1	4	4	7	10	13	13	16	16	16	16	19	20	20															

Source: EFL
A = Away; H = Home; W = Win; D = Draw; L = Loss; P = Postponed

==== Matches ====
The League One fixtures were revealed on 25 June 2026.

Win Draw Loss Fixtures

15 August 2026 1	Plymouth Argyle	1–3	Stockport County	Plymouth
15:00 BST	Pleguezuelo (yellow card) 74'; Amaechi 79'; Pepple (yellow card) 90+4'	Report	Diamond 13'; Wootton 26'; Glover 49'	Stadium: Home Park; Attendance: 16,244 (887 away); Referee: David Rock

22 August 2026 2	Wycombe Wanderers	1–1	Plymouth Argyle	High Wycombe
15:00 BST	Henderson (yellow card) 45+1'; Taylor 76'	Report	Evans 25', (yellow card) 80'; Harding (yellow card) 75'; Ibrahim (yellow card) 84'	Stadium: Adams Park; Attendance: 6,065 (1,539 away); Referee: Neil Hair

29 August 2026 3	Plymouth Argyle	2–0	Bradford City	Plymouth
15:00 BST	Evans (yellow card) 2'; Harding (yellow card) 33'; Pleguezuelo 44'; White 50'	Report	Beesley (yellow card) 2'; Connolly (yellow card) 88'	Stadium: Home Park; Attendance: 15,494 (891 away); Referee: Carl Brook

1 September 2026 4	Leicester City	2–0	Plymouth Argyle	Leicester
19:45 BST	Alves 45+3'; Howell 45+5'; Souttar (yellow card) 87'; Braybrooke (yellow card) 90'	Report	Amaechi (yellow card) 38'	Stadium: King Power Stadium; Attendance: 27,744 (1,630 away); Referee: Harry Wager

5 September 2026 5	Doncaster Rovers	2–3	Plymouth Argyle	Doncaster
15:00 BST	May 51' (pen.); Byrne (yellow card) 71'; Hutchinson (yellow card) 79'; Senior (yellow card) 86'; Grehan 90+5'	Report	Evans 28'; Pepple 74'; Watts 83'	Stadium: Club Doncaster Sports Village; Attendance: 7,996 (973 away); Referee: Matt Corlett

12 September 2026 6	Plymouth Argyle	3–0	Barnsley	Plymouth
15:00 BST	Irow 1'; Curtis 21'; Pepple 50'; Ross (yellow card) 76'; Evans (yellow card) 80'	Report	Gale (yellow card) 9'; Noslin (yellow card) 90'	Stadium: Home Park; Attendance: 15,743 (548 away); Referee: Martin Woods

19 September 2026 7	Blackpool	2–4	Plymouth Argyle	Blackpool
15:00 BST	Brown 30'; Yates (yellow card) 38', (goal) 70'; Williams (yellow card) 47'; Anderson (yellow card) 71'	Report	Irow 36', 52'; White 57'; Pepple 89'	Stadium: Bloomfield Road; Attendance: 10,855 (1,100 away); Referee: Darren Drysdale

26 September 2026 8	Plymouth Argyle	0–1	Burton Albion	Plymouth
15:00 BST	Evans (yellow card) 56'; Curtis (yellow card) 60'; Ross (yellow card) 86'	Report	Tilt (yellow card) 23'; Dennis (yellow card) 65'; Armer 70'; Krubally (yellow card) 84'	Stadium: Home Park; Attendance: 15,372 (159 away); Referee: Simon Mather

3 October 2026 9	Leyton Orient	0–2	Plymouth Argyle	Leyton
15:00 BST	Gilbert (yellow card) 45+1'; Springett (yellow card) 49'	Report	Pepple 52'; Evans 56'; Ross (yellow card) 76'; Ibrahim (yellow card) 84'	Stadium: Brisbane Road; Attendance: 8,832 (1,350 away); Referee: Scott Oldham

10 October 2026 10	Plymouth Argyle	2–1	AFC Wimbledon	Plymouth
12:30 BST	Watts 25'; Amaechi 90+5', (yellow card) 90+6'	Report	Stockley 16'	Stadium: Home Park; Attendance: 15,277 (481 away); Referee: Stephen Parkinson
Note: Fixture was initially scheduled for a 15:00 kick-off, but was brought forward for live Sky Sports broadcasting.

17 October 2026 11	Plymouth Argyle	0–2	Huddersfield Town	Plymouth
15:00 BST		Report	Fernandes 6'; Radulović 55'	Stadium: Home Park; Attendance: 16,124 (539 away); Referee: Ollie Yates

20 October 2026 12	Stevenage	3–0	Plymouth Argyle	Stevenage
19:45 BST	Thompson (yellow card) 7'; Mellon 19'; Magennis 27'; Patterson 83'	Report	Curtis (yellow card) 4'	Stadium: Broadhall Way; Attendance: 3,310 (1,000 away); Referee: Thomas Parsons

24 October 2026 13	Cambridge United	2–3	Plymouth Argyle	Cambridge
15:00 BST	Kaikai (yellow card) 14', (goal) 57'; Lavery 87'; Heffernan (yellow card) 90+5'	Report	Mitchell (yellow card) 12'; Bakinson (yellow card) 29'; Appéré 41' (o.g.); Amaechi 50'; Pepple 74' (pen.)	Stadium: Cledara Abbey Stadium; Attendance: 7,756 (1,036 away); Referee: Michael Barlow

31 October 2026 14	Plymouth Argyle	0–0	Reading	Plymouth
12:30 GMT	Evans (yellow card) 25'	Report	Dorsett (yellow card) 90+1'; Lisbie (yellow card) 90+1'; Rinomhota (yellow card) 90+4'	Stadium: Home Park; Attendance: 16,316 (1,350 away); Referee: Stephen Martin
Note: Fixture was initially scheduled for a 15:00 kick-off, but was brought forward for live Sky Sports broadcasting.

14 November 2026 15	Sheffield Wednesday	3–0	Plymouth Argyle	Owlerton
15:00 GMT	Mitchell (yellow card) 41', (goal) 45'; Keillor-Dunn 80'; Bernard 82'; Cooper (yellow card) 90+1'	Report	Curtis (yellow card) 17'; White (yellow card) 72'; Harding (yellow card) 79'	Stadium: Hillsborough Stadium; Attendance: 29,228 (1,000 away); Referee: Anthony Backhouse

21 November 2026 16	Plymouth Argyle	0–2	Peterborough United	Plymouth
15:00 GMT	White (yellow card) 45+1'; MacKenzie (yellow card) 70'; Evans (yellow card) 88'; Cooper (yellow card) 90+1'		Ashfield 22', (yellow card) 81'; Mills (yellow card) 48'; Feeney (yellow card) 59'; Leonard 90+2' (pen.)	Stadium: Home Park; Referee: Carl Brook

28 November 2026 17	Wigan Athletic	v	Plymouth Argyle	Wigan
15:00 GMT				Stadium: The Brick Community Stadium

1 December 2026 18	Plymouth Argyle	v	Bromley	Plymouth
19:45 GMT				Stadium: Home Park

12 December 2026 19	Notts County	v	Plymouth Argyle	Nottingham
15:00 GMT				Stadium: Meadow Lane

19 December 2026 20	Plymouth Argyle	v	Mansfield Town	Plymouth
15:00 GMT				Stadium: Home Park

26 December 2026 21	Oxford United	v	Plymouth Argyle	Littlemore
15:00 GMT				Stadium: The Kassam Stadium

29 December 2026 22	Plymouth Argyle	v	Milton Keynes Dons	Plymouth
19:45 GMT				Stadium: Home Park

2 January 2027 23	Plymouth Argyle	v	Luton Town	Plymouth
15:00 GMT				Stadium: Home Park
Note: Fixture was initially scheduled for 1 January, but was pushed back 24 hours.

9 January 2027 24	Mansfield Town	v	Plymouth Argyle	Mansfield
15:00 GMT				Stadium: One Call Stadium

16 January 2027 25	Huddersfield Town	v	Plymouth Argyle	Huddersfield
15:00 GMT				Stadium: Accu Stadium

19 January 2027 26	Plymouth Argyle	v	Stevenage	Plymouth
19:45 GMT				Stadium: Home Park

25 January 2027 27	Plymouth Argyle	v	Cambridge United	Plymouth
20:00 GMT				Stadium: Home Park
Note: Fixture was initially scheduled for 23 January, but was pushed back to Monday night for live Sky Sports broadcasting.

30 January 2027 28	Reading	v	Plymouth Argyle	Reading
15:00 GMT				Stadium: Select Car Leasing Stadium

6 February 2027 29	Bradford City	v	Plymouth Argyle	Bradford
15:00 GMT				Stadium: Mbanq Valley Parade

10 February 2027 30	Plymouth Argyle	v	Leicester City	Plymouth
20:00 GMT				Stadium: Home Park
Note: Fixture was initially scheduled for a 19:45 kick-off, but was pushed back fifteen minutes for live Sky Sports broadcasting.

=== FA Cup ===
Plymouth were drawn at home to Alvechurch in the first round and away to Crewe Alexandra in the second round.

Win Draw Loss Fixtures

7 November 2026 First round	Plymouth Argyle	4–0	Alvechurch	Plymouth
15:00 GMT	Evans 50', 69'; Hartridge (yellow card) 54'; Baidoo 78'; Curtis 80'	Report	Perry (yellow card) 45+1'; Newton (yellow card) 67'; Stephens (yellow card) 85'	Stadium: Home Park; Attendance: 10,426 (538 away); Referee: Elliott Swallow

6 December 2026 Second round	Crewe Alexandra	v	Plymouth Argyle	Plymouth
15:15 GMT				Stadium: Mornflake Stadium
Note: Fixture was selected for live TNT Sports broadcasting.

=== EFL Cup ===
Argyle were drawn at home to Exeter City in the first round and to Coventry City in the second round.

Win Draw Loss Fixtures

10 August 2026 First round	Plymouth Argyle	2–0	Exeter City	Plymouth
20:00 BST	Hartridge 90+2'; Pepple 90+4'	Report	Cummins (yellow card) 19'; Sutherland (yellow card) 78' (yellow-red card) 87'	Stadium: Home Park; Attendance: 16,755 (1,657 away); Referee: Dean Whitestone

25 August 2026 Second round	Plymouth Argyle	2–4	Coventry City	Plymouth
19:45 BST	Irow 21'; Amaechi 54', (yellow card) 62'	Report	Awoniyi 3'; Rudoni 5'; Latibeaudiere (yellow card) 12'; Mason-Clark 67'; Torp 78' (pen.); Eccles (yellow card) 85'	Stadium: Home Park; Attendance: 14,210 (2,244 away); Referee: Elliott Swallow

=== EFL Trophy ===
==== Group stage ====
Plymouth were drawn against Swindon Town, Newport County and Crystal Palace U21 in the Southern Group E.

Pos	Div	Team	Pld	W	PW	PL	L	GF	GA	GD	Pts	Qualification
1	L1	Plymouth Argyle	3	2	1	0	0	9	4	+5	8	Advance to Round 2
2	ACA	Crystal Palace U21	3	2	0	0	1	5	7	−2	6	Advance to Round 2
3	L2	Newport County	3	1	0	1	1	5	4	+1	4	
4	L2	Swindon Town	3	0	0	0	3	2	6	−4	0	

Source: EFL

Round	1	2	3
Ground	H	A	H
Result	W	W	W
Position	1	1	1
Points	3	5	8

Source: English Football League
A = Away; H = Home; W = Win; D = Draw; L = Loss

Win Draw Loss Fixtures

22 September 2026 Group stage	Plymouth Argyle	5–1	Crystal Palace U21	Plymouth
19:00 BST	Amaechi 11'; Watts 26', 37'; Campbell 66'; Pepple 84'	Report	Sealey (yellow card) 54'; Martin 57'	Stadium: Home Park; Attendance: 2,187 (79 away); Referee: Matthew Norton

6 October 2026 Group stage	Newport County	2–2 (4–5 p)	Plymouth Argyle	Newport
19:00 BST	K. Evans 3'; Bamba 59' (pen.)	Report	Pepple 75'; Bakinson 90'	Stadium: Rodney Parade; Attendance: 1,697 (451 away); Referee: Niall Smith
	Penalties
	Adu-Poku (penalty missed); Biggins (penalty scored); Jacob (penalty scored); Doidge (penalty scored); Lewis (penalty scored)		(penalty scored) White; (penalty scored) Irow; (penalty scored) Amaechi; (penalty scored) Pepple; (penalty scored) Ibrahim

10 November 2026 Group stage	Plymouth Argyle	2–1	Swindon Town	Plymouth
19:00 GMT	Curtis 27' (pen.); Ibrahim (yellow card) 42'; MacKenzie (yellow card) 61'; Campbell 90+9'	Report	McGregor (yellow card) 29'; Hackford 35'	Stadium: Home Park; Attendance: 2,508 (104 away); Referee: Lewis Sandoe

== Statistics ==
=== Appearances and goals ===
As of match played 14 November 2026

Players with no appearances are not included on the list, italics indicate a loaned in player

No.	Pos	Nat	Player	Total		League One		FA Cup		EFL Cup		EFL Trophy	
No.	Pos	Nat	Player	Apps	Goals	Apps	Goals	Apps	Goals	Apps	Goals	Apps	Goals
1	GK	(England) ENG	Murphy Cooper	15	0	14+0	0	0+0	0	1+0	0	0+0	0
2	DF	(Denmark) DEN	Mathias Ross	16	0	5+5	0	1+0	0	2+0	0	2+1	0
3	DF	(Scotland) SCO	Jack MacKenzie	8	0	4+1	0	0+0	0	0+0	0	3+0	0
4	DF	(England) ENG	Brendan Wiredu	1	0	0+1	0	0+0	0	0+0	0	0+0	0
5	DF	(Spain) ESP	Julio Pleguezuelo	13	1	9+2	1	0+0	0	0+1	0	0+1	0
6	MF	(England) ENG	Malachi Boateng	7	0	3+1	0	1+0	0	1+0	0	0+1	0
7	MF	(England) ENG	Harvey White	20	2	15+0	2	1+0	0	2+0	0	0+2	0
8	DF	(England) ENG	Joe Edwards	11	0	4+4	0	1+0	0	0+1	0	1+0	0
9	FW	(Wales) WAL	Will Evans	19	5	15+0	3	1+0	2	2+0	0	0+1	0
10	FW	(England) ENG	Xavier Amaechi	18	5	5+7	3	1+0	0	1+1	1	2+1	1
11	FW	(Republic of Ireland) IRL	Ronan Curtis	16	3	13+0	1	0+1	1	1+0	0	1+0	1
14	FW	(England) ENG	Oliver Irow	16	4	8+4	3	1+0	0	1+0	1	1+1	0
15	DF	(England) ENG	Alex Mitchell	16	0	13+1	0	1+0	0	1+0	0	0+0	0
17	MF	(Australia) AUS	Caleb Watts	16	4	2+11	2	0+0	0	1+0	0	2+0	2
18	FW	(Nigeria) NGR	Owen Oseni	5	0	0+3	0	0+0	0	0+0	0	2+0	0
19	MF	(England) ENG	Tyreeq Bakinson	15	1	9+2	0	0+1	0	1+0	0	1+1	1
20	MF	(Ghana) GHA	Michael Baidoo	1	1	0+0	0	0+1	1	0+0	0	0+0	0
21	GK	(Republic of Ireland) IRL	James Storer	6	0	1+0	0	1+0	0	1+0	0	3+0	0
22	DF	(England) ENG	Alex Hartridge	13	1	7+3	0	0+1	0	1+0	1	1+0	0
23	MF	(England) ENG	Bradley Ibrahim	18	0	5+9	0	0+0	0	1+0	0	2+1	0
24	MF	(England) ENG	Caleb Roberts	3	0	0+0	0	0+0	0	0+1	0	2+0	0
25	FW	(Wales) WAL	Freddie Issaka	1	0	0+0	0	0+0	0	0+1	0	0+0	0
26	MF	(England) ENG	Tegan Finn	2	0	0+0	0	0+0	0	0+1	0	1+0	0
27	FW	(England) ENG	Aribim Pepple	18	8	12+1	5	1+0	0	1+1	1	0+2	2
29	DF	(England) ENG	Matthew Sorinola	15	0	6+5	0	0+0	0	1+1	0	1+1	0
38	MF	(England) ENG	Sebastian Campbell	3	2	0+0	0	0+0	0	0+0	0	3+0	2
40	DF	(England) ENG	Joe Mwaro	2	0	0+0	0	0+0	0	1+0	0	1+0	0
42	DF	(England) ENG	Jared Rendle	5	0	0+1	0	0+1	0	0+0	0	3+0	0
45	DF	(Jamaica) JAM	Wes Harding	21	0	15+0	0	1+0	0	2+0	0	0+3	0
46	MF	(England) ENG	Frankie Maund	1	0	0+0	0	0+0	0	0+0	0	1+0	0

=== Clean sheets ===
As of match played 14 November 2026

Rank	No.	Player	League One	FA Cup	EFL Cup	EFL Trophy	Total
1	1	(England) Murphy Cooper	3	0	1	0	4
2	21	(Republic of Ireland) James Storer	1	0	0	0	1
Total			4	0	1	0	5

=== Disciplinary record ===
As of match played 14 November 2026

Rank	No.	Pos.	Player	League One			FA Cup			EFL Cup			EFL Trophy			Total		
Rank	No.	Pos.	Player	Yellow card	(yellow card) (yellow-red card)	Red card	Yellow card	(yellow card) (yellow-red card)	Red card	Yellow card	(yellow card) (yellow-red card)	Red card	Yellow card	(yellow card) (yellow-red card)	Red card	Yellow card	(yellow card) (yellow-red card)	Red card
1	9	CF	(Wales) Will Evans	4	0	0	0	0	0	0	0	0	0	0	0	4	0	0
2	2	CB	(Denmark) Mathias Ross	3	0	0	0	0	0	0	0	0	0	0	0	3	0	0
2	10	RW	(England) Xavier Amaechi	2	0	0	0	0	0	1	0	0	0	0	0	3	0	0
2	11	LW	(Republic of Ireland) Ronan Curtis	3	0	0	0	0	0	0	0	0	0	0	0	3	0	0
2	23	CDM	(England) Bradley Ibrahim	2	0	0	0	0	0	0	0	0	1	0	0	3	0	0
2	45	CB	(Jamaica) Wes Harding	3	0	0	0	0	0	0	0	0	0	0	0	3	0	0
7	3	LB	(Scotland) Jack MacKenzie	0	0	0	0	0	0	0	0	0	1	0	0	1	0	0
7	5	CB	(Spain) Julio Pleguezuelo	1	0	0	0	0	0	0	0	0	0	0	0	1	0	0
7	7	CDM	(England) Harvey White	1	0	0	0	0	0	0	0	0	0	0	0	1	0	0
7	15	CB	(England) Alex Mitchell	1	0	0	0	0	0	0	0	0	0	0	0	1	0	0
7	17	CAM	(Australia) Caleb Watts	0	0	0	0	0	0	0	0	0	1	0	0	1	0	0
7	19	CDM	(England) Tyreeq Bakinson	1	0	0	0	0	0	0	0	0	0	0	0	1	0	0
7	22	CB	(England) Alex Hartridge]	0	0	0	1	0	0	0	0	0	0	0	0	1	0	0
7	27	CF	(Canada) Aribim Pepple	1	0	0	0	0	0	0	0	0	0	0	0	1	0	0
Total				22	0	0	1	0	0	1	0	0	3	0	0	27	0	0

== Awards ==
=== Player awards ===
==== EFL League One Goal of the Month ====
Month	Player	Opposition	Result	Ref.
September	(England) Oliver Irow	v. Barnsley	Won	
September	(England) Harvey White	v. Blackpool	Nominated	

==== PFA League One Fans' Player of the Month ====
Month	Player	Result	Ref.
September	(England) Oliver Irow	Nominated	
