= 2024–25 Exeter City F.C. season =

123rd season in existence of Exeter City FC

Exeter City
2024–25 season
- Owner: Exeter City Supporters' Trust
- Chairman: Nick Hawker
- Manager: Gary Caldwell
- Stadium: St James Park
- League One: 16th
- FA Cup: Fourth round
- EFL Cup: First round
- EFL Trophy: Round of 32
- Top goalscorer: League: Millenic Alli (9 goals); All: Millenic Alli; Josh Magennis (12 goals)
- Highest home attendance: 8,330 vs. Nottingham Forest, 11 February 2025
- Lowest home attendance: 1,485 vs. Swindon Town, 3 September 2024
- Average home league attendance: 6,513
- Biggest win: Exeter City 5–3 Barnet (2 November 2024)
- Biggest defeat: Exeter City 2–6 Leyton Orient (28 January 2025)
Home colours	Away colours	Third colours

The 2024–25 season was the 123rd season in the history of Exeter City Football Club and their third consecutive season in League One. In addition to the domestic league, the club also participated in the FA Cup, the EFL Cup, and the EFL Trophy.

== Current squad ==
As of 5 May 2025

Note: Flags indicate national team as has been defined under FIFA eligibility rules. Players may hold more than one non-FIFA nationality.

No.	Name	Position	Nationality	Place of birth	Date of birth (age)	Previous club	Date signed	Fee	Contract end
Goalkeepers
1	Joe Whitworth	GK	(England)	Sutton	29 February 2004 (age 22)	Crystal Palace	16 July 2024	Loan	31 May 2025
37	Shaun MacDonald	GK	(England)	Newcastle-upon-Tyne	20 October 1996 (age 30)	Cheltenham Town	9 September 2023	Free	30 June 2025
Defenders
2	Jack McMillan	RB	(Scotland)	Livingston	18 December 1997 (age 28)	(Scotland) Partick Thistle	20 June 2024	Free	30 June 2026
3	Ben Purrington	LB	(England)	Exeter	20 May 1996 (age 30)	(Scotland) Ross County	11 January 2024	Undisclosed	30 June 2025
4	Alex Hartridge	CB	(England)	Torquay	9 March 1999 (age 27)	Wycombe Wanderers	30 January 2025	Loan	31 May 2025
5	Jack Fitzwater	CB	(England)	Solihull	23 September 1997 (age 29)	(Scotland) Livingston	5 September 2023	Free	30 June 2027
15	Johnly Yfeko	LB	(England)	London	23 June 2003 (age 23)	(Scotland) Rangers	23 July 2024	Loan	31 May 2025*
18	Vincent Harper	LB	(Kenya)	Nairobi	22 September 2000 (age 26)	Eastleigh	21 June 2023	Undisclosed	30 June 2025*
20	Ed Turns	CB	(Wales)	(England) Brighton	18 October 2002 (age 24)	Brighton & Hove Albion	3 February 2025	Undisclosed	30 June 2027
25	Angus MacDonald	CB	(England)	Winchester	15 October 1992 (age 34)	(Scotland) Aberdeen	3 February 2025	Free	30 June 2025
26	Pierce Sweeney	CB	(Republic of Ireland)	Dublin	11 September 1994 (age 32)	Swindon Town	8 July 2021	Free	30 June 2026
39	Cheick Diabate	CB	(England)	London	21 January 2002 (age 24)	Stevenage	1 July 2019	Free	30 June 2025
48	Louie Cayliss	CB	(England)			Academy	1 July 2024	Trainee	30 June 2025
Midfielders
6	Ryan Woods	DM	(England)	Norton Canes	13 December 1993 (age 32)	Hull City	2 July 2024	Free	30 June 2026
7	Demetri Mitchell	WB	(England)	Manchester	11 January 1997 (age 29)	(Scotland) Hibernian	26 January 2023	Undisclosed	30 June 2025
8	Edward Francis	CM	(England)	Poynton	11 September 1999 (age 27)	Gateshead	4 July 2024	Undisclosed	30 June 2026*
12	Reece Cole	CM	(England)	Hillingdon	17 February 1998 (age 28)	Hayes & Yeading United	10 July 2023	Free	30 June 2026*
14	Ilmari Niskanen	WB	(Finland)	Kiuruvesi	27 October 1997 (age 29)	(Scotland) Dundee United	15 August 2023	Undisclosed	30 June 2026
17	Caleb Watts	AM	(Australia)	(England) Essex	16 January 2002 (age 24)	Southampton	15 September 2023	Free	30 June 2025
21	Ryan Trevitt	CM	(England)	London	12 March 2003 (age 23)	Brentford	30 January 2025	Loan	31 May 2025
23	Joel Colwill	AM	(Wales)		27 October 2004 (age 22)	(Wales) Cardiff City	12 January 2025	Loan	31 May 2025
24	David Perkins	CM	(England)	Heysham	21 June 1982 (age 44)	Bamber Bridge	10 November 2022	Free	30 June 2025
28	Kevin McDonald	DM	(Scotland)	Carnoustie	4 November 1988 (age 38)	Bradford City	13 November 2024	Free	30 June 2025
46	Liam Oakes	CM	(England)			Academy	1 July 2024	Trainee	30 June 2025
47	Jake Richards	CM	(England)		8 August 2007 (age 19)	Academy	1 July 2023	Trainee	30 June 2025
Forwards
10	Jack Aitchison	FW	(Scotland)	Fauldhouse	5 March 2000 (age 26)	(Scotland) Motherwell	1 July 2023	Free	30 June 2026
11	Andrew Oluwabori	RW	(England)			FC Halifax Town	3 February 2025	Undisclosed	30 June 2027
13	Yanic Wildschut	LW	(Suriname)	(Netherlands) Amsterdam	1 November 1991 (age 35)	Oxford United	15 September 2023	Free	30 June 2025
16	Pat Jones	LW	(Wales)	(England) Stockport	9 June 2003 (age 23)	Huddersfield Town	30 August 2024	Undisclosed	30 June 2025*
19	Sonny Cox	CF	(England)	Exeter	11 October 2004 (age 22)	Academy	1 July 2021	Trainee	30 June 2026*
27	Josh Magennis	ST	(Northern Ireland)	Bangor	15 August 1990 (age 36)	Wigan Athletic	27 June 2024	Free	30 June 2026
30	Tony Yogane	LW	(England)	Croydon	24 September 2005 (age 21)	Brentford	23 January 2025	Loan	31 May 2025
44	Theo Cutler	FW	(England)	Dorchester		Academy	19 September 2023	Trainee	30 June 2025
49	Kieran Wilson	CF	(Scotland)			Academy	1 July 2024	Trainee	30 June 2025
Out on Loan
22	Harry Lee	GK	(England)	Torbay	22 December 2004 (age 21)	Academy	1 July 2021	Trainee	30 June 2025
31	Jay Bird	CF	(England)	Milton Keynes	6 May 2001 (age 25)	(Scotland) Arbroath	2 July 2024	Free	30 June 2025*
33	Tom Dean	CM	(England)			Academy	1 July 2024	Trainee	30 June 2025
34	Gabriel Billington	CM	(England)	Taunton		Academy	1 July 2023	Trainee	30 June 2025
36	Mitch Beardmore	LM	(England)	Somerset	7 September 2004 (age 22)	Academy	1 July 2023	Trainee	30 June 2025
38	Max Edgecombe	CB	(England)			Academy	1 July 2023	Trainee	30 June 2025
40	Ed James	CB	(Wales)	(England) Exeter		Academy	1 July 2023	Trainee	30 June 2026
41	Pedro Borges	AM	(Portugal)		23 July 2005 (age 21)	Academy	1 July 2023	Trainee	30 June 2025
45	Charlie Cummins	CM	(Republic of Ireland)			(Republic of Ireland) Cobh Ramblers	26 January 2024	Undisclosed	30 June 2026

Note: The club have confirmed some players have an option of an additional year on their existing contracts are denoted with an asterisk (*).

== Statistics ==
=== Appearances and goals ===
As of match played 3 May 2025

Players with no appearances are not included on the list
Italics indicate a loaned in player

No.	Pos	Nat	Player	Total		League One		FA Cup		EFL Cup		EFL Trophy	
No.	Pos	Nat	Player	Apps	Goals	Apps	Goals	Apps	Goals	Apps	Goals	Apps	Goals
1	GK	(England) ENG	Joe Whitworth	51	0	46+0	0	4+0	0	1+0	0	0+0	0
2	DF	(Scotland) SCO	Jack McMillan	49	2	43+0	2	4+0	0	1+0	0	1+0	0
3	DF	(England) ENG	Ben Purrington	27	0	12+9	0	1+0	0	1+0	0	4+0	0
4	DF	(England) ENG	Alex Hartridge	18	1	18+0	1	0+0	0	0+0	0	0+0	0
5	DF	(England) ENG	Jack Fitzwater	23	1	13+3	1	1+1	0	0+1	0	4+0	0
6	MF	(England) ENG	Ryan Woods	41	2	26+11	2	3+1	0	0+0	0	0+0	0
7	MF	(England) ENG	Demetri Mitchell	28	7	12+11	4	2+1	2	0+0	0	0+2	1
8	MF	(England) ENG	Edward Francis	49	3	34+8	2	2+2	0	0+0	0	3+0	1
10	FW	(Scotland) SCO	Jack Aitchison	34	1	22+6	0	2+1	0	0+1	0	2+0	1
11	FW	(England) ENG	Andrew Oluwabori	6	1	1+5	1	0+0	0	0+0	0	0+0	0
12	MF	(England) ENG	Reece Cole	28	3	8+15	3	1+1	0	1+0	0	0+2	0
14	MF	(Finland) FIN	Ilmari Niskanen	45	2	35+5	2	3+0	0	1+0	0	0+1	0
15	DF	(England) ENG	Johnly Yfeko	13	0	11+1	0	1+0	0	0+0	0	0+0	0
16	FW	(Wales) WAL	Pat Jones	19	0	6+11	0	0+2	0	0+0	0	0+0	0
17	MF	(Australia) AUS	Caleb Watts	37	4	20+11	4	1+1	0	1+0	0	3+0	0
18	DF	(Kenya) KEN	Vincent Harper	28	2	10+12	1	2+1	1	0+1	0	1+1	0
19	FW	(England) ENG	Sonny Cox	27	1	7+16	1	0+1	0	0+0	0	2+1	0
20	DF	(Wales) WAL	Ed Turns	14	0	13+0	0	1+0	0	0+0	0	0+0	0
21	MF	(England) ENG	Ryan Trevitt	12	1	10+1	1	1+0	0	0+0	0	0+0	0
23	MF	(Wales) WAL	Joel Colwill	18	0	9+9	0	0+0	0	0+0	0	0+0	0
24	MF	(England) ENG	David Perkins	1	0	0+0	0	0+0	0	0+0	0	0+1	0
25	DF	(England) ENG	Angus MacDonald	16	1	14+1	1	1+0	0	0+0	0	0+0	0
26	DF	(Republic of Ireland) IRL	Pierce Sweeney	23	1	18+0	0	2+0	0	1+0	0	2+0	1
27	FW	(Northern Ireland) NIR	Josh Magennis	46	12	35+5	6	4+0	6	0+1	0	0+1	0
28	MF	(Scotland) SCO	Kevin McDonald	14	0	9+2	0	0+2	0	0+0	0	1+0	0
30	FW	(England) ENG	Tony Yogane	19	0	5+13	0	0+1	0	0+0	0	0+0	0
31	FW	(England) ENG	Jay Bird	20	2	2+12	0	0+3	1	0+0	0	2+1	1
33	MF	(England) ENG	Tom Dean	3	0	2+1	0	0+0	0	0+0	0	0+0	0
37	GK	(England) ENG	Shaun MacDonald	4	0	0+0	0	0+0	0	0+0	0	4+0	0
39	DF	(England) ENG	Cheick Diabate	5	0	2+2	0	0+0	0	1+0	0	0+0	0
40	DF	(Wales) WAL	Ed James	3	0	0+0	0	0+0	0	0+0	0	3+0	0
41	MF	(Portugal) POR	Pedro Borges	4	0	0+1	0	0+0	0	1+0	0	2+0	0
44	FW	(England) ENG	Theo Cutler	1	0	0+0	0	0+0	0	0+0	0	0+1	0
46	MF	(England) ENG	Liam Oakes	5	0	0+1	0	0+0	0	1+0	0	1+2	0
47	MF	(England) ENG	Jake Richards	20	2	9+4	1	3+0	0	0+0	0	3+1	1
48	DF	(England) ENG	Louie Cayliss	2	0	0+0	0	0+0	0	0+0	0	0+2	0
49	FW	(England) ENG	Kieran Wilson	1	0	0+0	0	0+0	0	0+0	0	0+1	0
Player(s) who featured whilst on loan but returned to parent club during the season:
4	DF	(France) FRA	Tristan Crama	26	4	22+0	3	3+0	1	0+1	0	0+0	0
20	MF	(England) ENG	Kamari Doyle	24	4	10+10	3	0+2	1	0+0	0	1+1	0
21	FW	(England) ENG	Amani Richards	6	1	2+4	1	0+0	0	0+0	0	0+0	0
Player(s) who featured but departed the club permanently during the season:
11	FW	(Republic of Ireland) IRL	Millenic Alli	33	12	19+6	9	2+1	0	1+0	1	3+1	2
29	MF	(The Gambia) GAM	Mustapha Carayol	8	0	1+5	0	0+0	0	0+0	0	2+0	0

== Transfers ==
=== In ===
Date	Pos.	Player	From	Fee	Ref.
1 July 2024 (Note: The transfer was announced on 27 June, and would become official on July 1 once his Wigan Athletic contract expired)	CF	Josh Magennis (NIR)	Wigan Athletic (ENG)	Free	
1 July 2024 (Note: The transfer was announced on 20 June, and would become official on July 1 once his Partick Thistle contract expired)	RB	Jack McMillan (SCO)	Partick Thistle (SCO)	Free	
2 July 2024	CF	Jay Bird (ENG)	Arbroath (SCO)	Free	
2 July 2024	DM	Ryan Woods (ENG)	Hull City (ENG)	Free	
4 July 2024	CM	Edward Francis (ENG)	Gateshead (ENG)	Undisclosed	
27 July 2024	GK	Frankie Phillips (ENG)	Paulton Rovers (ENG)	Free	
30 August 2024	LW	Pat Jones (WAL)	Huddersfield Town (ENG)	Undisclosed	
20 September 2024	LW	Mustapha Carayol (GAM)	Free agent	Free	
13 November 2024	DM	Kevin McDonald (SCO)	Free agent	Free	
3 February 2025	RW	Andrew Oluwabori (ENG)	FC Halifax Town (ENG)	Undisclosed	
3 February 2025	CB	Ed Turns (WAL)	Brighton & Hove Albion (ENG)	Undisclosed	
3 February 2025	CB	Angus MacDonald (ENG)	Aberdeen (SCO)	Free	

=== Out ===
Date	Pos.	Player	To	Fee	Ref
15 July 2024	CB	Will Aimson (ENG)	Wigan Athletic (ENG)	Undisclosed	
30 January 2025	CF	Millenic Alli (IRL)	Luton Town (ENG)	Undisclosed	

=== Loaned in ===
Date	Pos.	Player	From	Date until	Ref.
16 July 2024	GK	Joe Whitworth (ENG)	Crystal Palace (ENG)	End of Season	
23 July 2024	LB	Johnly Yfeko (ENG)	Rangers (SCO)	End of Season	
31 July 2024	CB	Tristan Crama (FRA)	Brentford (ENG)	16 January 2025 (Note: On 16 January, Crama was recalled to his parent club Brentford)	
16 August 2024	AM	Kamari Doyle (ENG)	Brighton & Hove Albion (ENG)	27 January 2025 (Note: On 27 January, Doyle was recalled to his parent club Brighton)	
29 August 2024	RW	Amani Richards (ENG)	Leicester City (ENG)	15 January 2025 (Note: On 15 January, Richards was recalled to his parent club Leicester)	
12 January 2025	AM	Joel Colwill (WAL)	Cardiff City (WAL)	End of Season	
23 January 2025	LW	Tony Yogane (ENG)	Brentford (ENG)	End of Season	
30 January 2025	CB	Alex Hartridge (ENG)	Wycombe Wanderers (ENG)	End of Season	
30 January 2025	CM	Ryan Trevitt (ENG)	Brentford (ENG)	End of Season	

=== Loaned out ===
Date	Pos.	Player	To	Date until	Ref.
1 August 2024	GK	Frankie Phillips (ENG)	Exmouth Town (ENG)	End of Season (Note: On 7 January, Phillips' loan at Exmouth was extended until the end of season.)	
2 August 2024	LM	Mitch Beardmore (ENG)	Plymouth Parkway (ENG)	1 January 2025	
2 August 2024	CM	Tom Dean (ENG)	Plymouth Parkway (ENG)	1 January 2025	
30 August 2024	CB	Cheick Diabate (ENG)	Bradford City (ENG)	6 January 2025 (Note: On 6 January, Diabate was recalled early from his loan at Bradford.)	
5 September 2024	CM	Charlie Cummins (IRL)	Poole Town (ENG)	1 January 2025 (Note: On 21 November, James was recalled early from his loan at Poole Town.)	
5 November 2024	CM	Pedro Borges (POR)	Yeovil Town (ENG)	1 January 2025	
21 November 2024	CM	Charlie Cummins (IRL)	Taunton Town (ENG)	13 January 2025	
27 November 2024	CB	Ed James (WAL)	Yeovil Town (ENG)	23 December 2024 (Note: On 23 December, James was recalled early from his loan at Yeovil due to a hamstring injury.)	
13 December 2024	CM	Gabe Billington (ENG)	Tiverton Town (ENG)	6 February 2025	
31 December 2024	LM	Max Edgecombe (ENG)	Tavistock (ENG)	25 March 2025	
7 January 2025	LM	Mitch Beardmore (ENG)	Bath City (ENG)	End of Season	
13 January 2025	CM	Charlie Cummins (IRL)	Tiverton Town (ENG)	10 February 2025	
16 January 2025	CM	Pedro Borges (POR)	Weston-super-Mare (ENG)	End of Season	
21 February 2025	CB	Ed James (WAL)	Bath City (ENG)	End of Season	
25 February 2025	CF	Jay Bird (ENG)	Rochdale (ENG)	End of Season	

=== Released / Out of Contract ===
Date	Pos.	Player	Subsequent club	Join Date	Ref.
30 June 2024	CB	Alex Hartridge (ENG)	Wycombe Wanderers (ENG)	1 July 2024	
30 June 2024	CB	Zak Jules (SCO)	Rotherham United (ENG)	1 July 2024	
30 June 2024	CF	James Scott (SCO)	St Mirren (SCO)	1 July 2024	
30 June 2024	CM	Tom Carroll (ENG)	Milton Keynes Dons (ENG)	5 July 2024	
30 June 2024	GK	Gary Woods (ENG)	Greenock Morton (SCO)	8 July 2024	
30 June 2024	CB	Joe O'Connor (ENG)	Georgia Southern Eagles (USA)	1 August 2024	
30 June 2024	CM	Harry Kite (ENG)	Yeovil Town (ENG)	28 March 2025	
30 June 2024	RM	Harrison King (ENG)	Free agent		
30 June 2024	CM	Kyle Taylor (SUI)	Free agent		
20 January 2025	LW	Mustapha Carayol (GAM)	Wealdstone (ENG)	15 March 2025	

== Pre-season and friendlies ==
On 7 May, Exeter City announced their first pre-season friendly, against Weston-super-Mare. A day later, a trip to Yeovil Town was added. Again, a day later, the club announced a three-day training camp in Cornwall, with a match scheduled against Mousehole. A fourth friendly, against Torquay United was also added to the schedule. A behind closed doors friendly at the club's training ground against Brentford B was also added to the club's pre-season schedule. On May 29, a sixth opposition was confirmed, Tiverton Town. Two days later, the club announced their pre-season would conclude with the visit of Eastleigh. A further two behind closed doors friendlies were confirmed, against Bristol City and Oxford United.

Win Draw Loss Fixtures

9 July 2024 Friendly	Tiverton Town	1–2	Exeter City	Tiverton
19:30 BST	Parker 26'	Report	Watts 32'; Cox 80'	Stadium: The Ian Moorcroft Stadium

12 July 2024 Friendly	Weston-super-Mare	1–1	Exeter City	Weston-super-Mare
19:00 BST	Coulson 7'	Report	Wildschut 3'	Stadium: Woodspring Stadium; Attendance: 708

15 July 2024 Friendly	Mousehole	1–4	Exeter City	Paul
19:00 BST	Mitchell 24'	Report	Alli 4', 8', 52'; Magennis 75'	Stadium: Trungle Parc; Attendance: 362

19 July 2024 Friendly	Yeovil Town	1–3	Exeter City	Yeovil
19:30 BST	Nouble 72'; Morgan (penalty missed) 83'	Report	Cox 4'; Ohanaka 70' (pen.); Wilson 76'	Stadium: Huish Park; Attendance: 2,599 (379 away)

24 July 2024 Friendly	Oxford United	0–1	Exeter City	Oxford
15:00 BST		Report	Magennis 16'	Stadium: Oxford Sports Park; Attendance: 0 (behind closed doors)

27 July 2024 Friendly	Bristol City	2–1	Exeter City	Failand
13:00 BST	Cornick 58', 68'	Report	Magennis 80' (pen.)	Stadium: Robins High Performance Centre; Attendance: 0 (behind closed doors)

30 July 2024 Friendly	Exeter City	4–1	Brentford B	Clyst St Mary
13:00 BST	Borges 18', 43'; Cox 20', 24'	Report	Hay 1'	Stadium: Cliff Hill Training Ground; Attendance: 0 (behind closed doors)

30 July 2024 Friendly	Torquay United	2–2	Exeter City	Torquay
19:30 BST	Dyer 80'; Fitzwater 90+6' (o.g.)	Report	Magennis 2'; Fitzwater 40'	Stadium: Plainmoor

3 August 2024 Friendly	Exeter City	3–0	Eastleigh	Exeter
15:00 BST	Crama 18'; Cole 41' (pen.); Magennis 53'	Report		Stadium: St James Park; Attendance: 2,399

== Competitions ==
=== Overall record ===
Competition	First match	Last match	Starting round	Final position	Record							
Competition	First match	Last match	Starting round	Final position	Pld	W	D	L	GF	GA	GD	Win %
League One	10 August 2024	3 May 2025	Matchday 1	16th place	46	15	11	20	49	65	−16	32.61
FA Cup	2 November 2024	11 February 2025	First round	Fourth round	4	3	1	0	12	6	+6	75.00
EFL Cup	13 August 2024	13 August 2024	First round	First round	1	0	1	0	1	1	+0	0.00
EFL Trophy	3 September 2024	10 December 2024	Group stage	Round of 32	4	3	0	1	8	5	+3	75.00
Total					55	21	13	21	70	77	−7	38.18

Last updated: 3 May 2025

=== League One ===
==== League table ====
Pos	Team	Pld	W	D	L	GF	GA	GD	Pts
14	Stevenage	46	15	12	19	42	50	−8	57
15	Wigan Athletic	46	13	17	16	40	42	−2	56
16	Exeter City	46	15	11	20	49	65	−16	56
17	Mansfield Town	46	15	9	22	60	73	−13	54
18	Peterborough United	46	13	12	21	68	81	−13	51

Source: EFL Official Website
Rules for classification: 1) Points; 2) Goal difference; 3) Number of goals scored; 4) Head-to-head results; 5) Wins; 6) Away goals; 7) Penalty points (sec 9.5); 8) 12-point sending off offences

==== Results summary ====
Overall								Home						Away					
Pld	W	D	L	GF	GA	GD	Pts	W	D	L	GF	GA	GD	W	D	L	GF	GA	GD
46	15	11	20	49	65	−16	56	8	6	9	30	33	−3	7	5	11	19	32	−13

Last updated: 3 May 2025.
Source: Soccerway

==== Results by round ====
Round	1	2	3	4	6	7	8	9	10	12	13	14	15	16	17	5^{1}	18	19	20	21	22	23	24	25	27	26^{3}	28	29	30	32	33	34	35	36	11^{2}	37	38	39	40	41	31^{4}	42	43	44	45	46
Ground	H	A	H	A	A	H	A	A	H	A	H	A	H	H	A	H	H	A	H	A	H	H	A	H	A	A	H	H	A	A	A	H	A	H	H	A	A	H	A	H	H	A	H	A	H	A
Result	W	L	L	W	L	W	D	W	W	W	L	L	W	D	L	L	D	L	L	W	W	D	L	L	L	D	L	L	L	W	L	D	D	W	W	D	D	L	W	L	D	W	D	L	W	L
Position	10	16	17	10	16	11	13	10	7	5	6	10	11	9	11	11	11	11	15	13	12	13	13	14	16	14	17	17	17	16	18	19	19	18	16	16	16	17	16	16	15	15	14	16	15	16
Points	3	3	3	6	6	9	10	13	16	19	19	19	22	23	23	23	24	24	24	27	30	31	31	31	31	32	32	32	32	35	35	36	37	40	43	44	45	45	48	48	49	52	53	53	56	56

Source: Soccerway
A = Away; H = Home; W = Win; D = Draw; L = Loss; P = Postponed
Notes:
- ^{1} Matchday 5 (vs Birmingham City) was postponed due to the international call-ups.
- ^{2} Matchday 11 (vs Mansfield Town) was postponed due to the international call-ups, and then for a second time due to Mansfield's FA Cup involvement.
- ^{3} Matchday 26 (vs Peterborough United) was postponed due to both clubs being in FA Cup action.
- ^{4} Matchday 31 (vs Wigan Athletic) was postponed due to both clubs being in FA Cup action.

==== Matches ====
On 26 June, the League One fixtures were announced.

Win Draw Loss Fixtures

10 August 2024 1	Exeter City	1–0	Rotherham United	Exeter
17:30 BST	Yfeko (yellow card) 64'; Watts 71'; Borges (yellow card) 90+3'	Report	Raggett (yellow card) 81'	Stadium: St James Park; Attendance: 7,458 (901 away); Referee: Paul Howard

17 August 2024 2	Northampton Town	2–1	Exeter City	Northampton
15:00 BST	McGowan (yellow card) 55'; Morton 65'; McGeehan 77'; Mbete (yellow card) 87'	Report	Crama 8'; Francis (yellow card) 35'; Cole (yellow card) 43'	Stadium: Sixfields Stadium; Attendance: 5,981 (490 away); Referee: Carl Brook

24 August 2024 3	Exeter City	1–2	Peterborough United	Exeter
15:00 BST	Cole 4'; Yfeko (yellow card) 70'	Report	Mothersille 7'; Wallin (yellow card) 23'; Fernandez 45'; Collins (penalty missed) 74', (yellow card) 90+5'; Curtis (yellow card) 90'	Stadium: St James Park; Attendance: 6,343 (506 away); Referee: Will Finnie

31 August 2024 4	Bolton Wanderers	0–2	Exeter City	Horwich
15:00 BST	Santos (yellow card) 23'; Johnston (yellow card) 66'; Dacres-Cogley (yellow card) 90+1'	Report	Sweeney (yellow card) 9'; Doyle 34'; Alli 49'; Niskanen (yellow card) 53'; Whitworth (yellow card) 69'; Cole (yellow card) 81'; Yfeko (yellow card) 90+1'	Stadium: Toughsheet Community Stadium; Attendance: 22,086 (509 away); Referee: Ben Toner

14 September 2024 6	Blackpool	2–1	Exeter City	Blackpool
15:00 BST	Offiah (yellow card) 10'; Hamilton 19'; Norburn (yellow card) 21'; Joseph (yellow card) 58'; Lawrence-Gabriel (yellow card) 75'; Evans (yellow card) 85'; Rhodes (yellow card) 87'; Husband 90+4'; Tyrer (yellow card) 90+6'	Report	Woods (yellow card) 57'; Niskanen (yellow card) 70'; Crama (yellow card) 81'; Aitchison (yellow card) 85'; Francis 88'	Stadium: Bloomfield Road; Attendance: 8,813 (388 away); Referee: Ross Joyce

21 September 2024 7	Exeter City	2–0	Stevenage	Exeter
12:30 BST	Francis 9'; Doyle 50'; Crama (yellow card) 55'	Report	Roberts (yellow card) 44'; Piergianni (yellow card) 83'	Stadium: St James Park; Attendance: 5,612 (123 away); Referee: Neil Hair
Note: Fixture was initially scheduled for a 15:00 kick-off, but was moved for live Sky Sports broadcast.

28 September 2024 8	Wigan Athletic	0–0	Exeter City	Wigan
15:00 BST		Report	A. Richards (yellow card) 38'; McMillan (yellow card) 90+3'	Stadium: Brick Community Stadium; Attendance: 8,837 (400 away); Referee: Scott Simpson

1 October 2024 9	Leyton Orient	0–1	Exeter City	Leyton
19:45 BST	Ball (yellow card) 53'; Brown (yellow card) 77'	Report	A. Richards 40'; Niskanen (yellow card) 44'; McMillan (yellow card) 48'; Sweeney (yellow card) 89'; Watts (red card) 90+3'	Stadium: Brisbane Road; Attendance: 6,439 (645 away); Referee: Ruebyn Ricardo

5 October 2024 10	Exeter City	1–0	Cambridge United	Exeter
15:00 BST	Woods 23', (yellow card) 74'; Yfeko (yellow card) 45+2'	Report	Loft (yellow card) 19'; Andrew (yellow card) 78'	Stadium: St James Park; Attendance: 6,406 (202 away); Referee: Scott Tallis

17 October 2024 12	Shrewsbury Town	0–2	Exeter City	Shrewsbury
20:00 BST		Report	Doyle 9'; Magennis 64'; Sweeney (yellow card) 79'	Stadium: New Meadow; Attendance: 4,965 (282 away); Referee: David Rock
Note: Fixture was initially scheduled for 19 October, but was moved for live Sky Sports broadcast.

22 October 2024 13	Exeter City	1–2	Reading	Exeter
19:45 BST	Woods (yellow card) 55'; Niskanen 58'	Report	Wareham 1'; Craig 36'; Mbengue (yellow card) 77'	Stadium: St James Park; Attendance: 6,807 (713 away); Referee: Sam Purkiss

26 October 2024 14	Huddersfield Town	2–0	Exeter City	Huddersfield
15:00 BST	Pearson 16'; Wiles 63'	Report		Stadium: Kirklees Stadium; Attendance: 17,890 (571 away); Referee: Elliot Bell

9 November 2024 15	Exeter City	1–0	Charlton Athletic	Exeter
15:00 GMT	Woods (yellow card) 22'; Crama 59'; Aitchison (yellow card) 73'; Niskanen (yellow card) 90+2'	Report	Gillesphey (yellow card) 39'	Stadium: St James Park; Attendance: 7,347 (914 away); Referee: Matthew Corlett

16 November 2024 16	Exeter City	0–0	Lincoln City	Exeter
12:30 GMT	Woods (yellow card) 66' (yellow-red card) 90'; Sweeney (yellow card) 72'	Report	McGrandles (yellow card) 13'; House (yellow card) 44'	Stadium: St James Park; Attendance: 5,950 (216 away); Referee: Thomas Parsons
Note: Fixture was initially scheduled for a 15:00 kick-off, but was moved for live Sky Sports broadcast.

23 November 2024 17	Wrexham	3–0	Exeter City	Wrexham
15:00 GMT	Rathbone (yellow card) 4', (goal) 72'; Cleworth 7'; Palmer 25'	Report	Watts (yellow card) 40'; Aitchison (yellow card) 51'	Stadium: Racecourse Ground; Attendance: 12,484 (1,270 away); Referee: Stephen Martin

26 November 2024 5	Exeter City	0–2	Birmingham City	Exeter
19:45 GMT	Crama (yellow card) 28'; Francis (yellow card) 63'; Woods (yellow card) 64'; Doyle (yellow card) 84'	Report	Iwata 11'; Davies (yellow card) 39'; Bielik (yellow card) 61'; Stansfield 83' (pen.)	Stadium: St James Park; Attendance: 7,928 (998 away); Referee: Alex Chilowicz
Note: Fixture was originally scheduled for 7 September, but was postponed due to international call-ups.

3 December 2024 18	Exeter City	2–2	Wycombe Wanderers	Exeter
19:45 GMT	Alli 2'; McMillan 22'	Report	Low 27', (yellow card) 83'; Humphreys 54'	Stadium: St James Park; Attendance: 5,074 (335 away); Referee: James Durkin

7 December 2024 19	Stockport County	2–0	Exeter City	Stockport
15:00 GMT	Mingi (yellow card) 49'; Crama 67' (o.g.); Hughes (yellow card) 82'; Barry 89' (pen.)	Report	Harper (yellow card) 50'; Watts (yellow card) 60'; Woods (yellow card) 72'	Stadium: Edgeley Park; Attendance: 9,192 (687 away); Referee: Scott Oldham

14 December 2024 20	Exeter City	1–2	Barnsley	Exeter
15:00 GMT	Magennis 13'	Report	McCarthy (yellow card) 11'; Nwakali 49'; Keillor-Dunn 58'; Pines (yellow card) 90+1'; Lofthouse (yellow card) 90+3'	Stadium: St James Park; Attendance: 5,669 (349 away); Referee: Scott Tallis

21 December 2024 21	Burton Albion	1–2	Exeter City	Burton upon Trent
15:00 GMT	Bodin 8'; Watt (yellow card) 21'; Sraha (yellow card) 59'; Gilligan (yellow card) 69'; Vancooten (yellow card) 78'	Report	Woods (yellow card) 13'; McDonald (yellow card) 43'; Magennis 45+2'; Alli 71', (yellow card) 81'; J. Richards (yellow card) 85'	Stadium: Pirelli Stadium; Attendance: 2,690; Referee: Sebastien Stockbridge

26 December 2024 22	Exeter City	3–1	Bristol Rovers	Exeter
15:00 GMT	Niskanen (yellow card) 13'; McDonald (yellow card) 44'; Fitzwater 72'; Alli 78'; J. Richards 90+6'	Report	Conteh (yellow card) 30'; Omochere 61'; Lindsay (yellow card) 68'	Stadium: St James Park; Attendance: 8,192 (1,042 away); Referee: Tom Reeves

29 December 2024 23	Exeter City	4–4	Crawley Town	Exeter
15:00 GMT	Bird (yellow card) 20'; Alli 35', (yellow card) 89'; Watts (yellow card) 49'; Harper 60'; Woods 82'; Mitchell 90+3'	Report	Camará 15'; Swan 37'; Showunmi 42'; Quitirna 45+1'; Ibrahim (yellow card) 65'; Mullarkey (yellow card) 78'	Stadium: St James Park; Attendance: 6,805 (210 away); Referee: Matthew Russell

1 January 2025 24	Wycombe Wanderers	2–1	Exeter City	High Wycombe
15:00 GMT	Leahy 66'; Morley 90+4' (pen.)	Report	Harper (yellow card) 22'; Magennis (yellow card) 39'; Woods (yellow card) 65'; Crama (yellow card) 77', (goal) 86'	Stadium: Adams Park; Attendance: 5,829 (630 away); Referee: Scott Simpson

4 January 2025 25	Exeter City	1–2	Bolton Wanderers	Exeter
15:00 GMT	Mitchell 54'; J. Richards (yellow card) 63'; McMillan (yellow card) 90'	Report	Schön (yellow card) 22'; Thomason (yellow card) 51'; Williams (yellow card) 62'; McAtee (yellow card) 81'; Collins 88'; Morley 90+1'; Forrester (yellow card) 90+5'	Stadium: St James Park; Attendance: 6,353 (626 away); Referee: Ben Speedie

18 January 2025 27	Birmingham City	1–0	Exeter City	Bordesley
15:00 GMT	Leonard (yellow card) 36'; Klarer (yellow card) 45+1'; Laird 45+2'	Report	Woods (yellow card) 12'; McMillan (yellow card) 34' (yellow-red card) 90+13'; Watts (yellow card) 52'; Harper (yellow card) 69'	Stadium: St Andrew's; Attendance: 25,930 (1,846 away); Referee: Elliot Bell

21 January 2025 26	Peterborough United	1–1	Exeter City	Peterborough
19:45 GMT	Kyprianou 34', (yellow card) 90+5'	Report	Alli (penalty missed) 90+1', 90+1'	Stadium: London Road Stadium; Attendance: 5,913 (162 away); Referee: Sunny Singh Gill
Note: Fixture was initially scheduled for 11 January, but was moved due to FA Cup involvements for both teams.

25 January 2025 28	Exeter City	1–3	Blackpool	Exeter
15:00 GMT	Alli 82'; Niskanen (yellow card) 86'	Report	Carey (yellow card) 13'; Hamilton 33'; Bloxham 43'; Fletcher 45+1'; Tyrer (yellow card) 79'	Stadium: St James Park; Attendance: 6,325 (342 away); Referee: James Oldham

28 January 2025 29	Exeter City	2–6	Leyton Orient	Exeter
19:45 GMT	Alli 47', 56'	Report	Abdulai 5', 7', 64'; Clare 14'; Galbraith (yellow card) 26'; Markanday 34'; Beckles (yellow card) 52'; Keeley (yellow card) 60'; Donley 78'; Cooper (yellow card) 90+1'	Stadium: St James Park; Attendance: 5,022 (251 away); Referee: Ruebyn Ricardo

1 February 2025 30	Stevenage	4–1	Exeter City	Stevenage
12:30 GMT	King (yellow card) 2', (goal) 11'; Roberts 17', 80'; Freeman (yellow card) 24'; Reid (yellow card) 44'; Kemp 76'	Report	Magennis 2' (pen.); Diabate (yellow card) 90'	Stadium: Broadhall Way; Attendance: 3,094 (279 away); Referee: Ollie Yates
Note: Fixture was initially scheduled for a 15:00 kick-off, but was moved for live Sky Sports broadcasting.

15 February 2025 32	Cambridge United	0–1	Exeter City	Cambridge
12:30 GMT	Morrison (yellow card) 90+7'	Report	Harper (yellow card) 41'; A. MacDonald (yellow card) 44'; Watts (yellow card) 54'; Magennis 73'; Whitworth (yellow card) 90+4'	Stadium: Abbey Stadium; Attendance: 5,455 (339 away); Referee: Carl Brook
Note: Fixture was initially scheduled for a 15:00 kick-off, but was moved for live Sky Sports broadcasting.

22 February 2025 33	Charlton Athletic	3–0	Exeter City	Charlton
15:00 GMT	A. MacDonald 20' (o.g.); Campbell 68'; Anderson (yellow card) 69'; Small (yellow card) 72'; Leaburn 84'; Gillesphey (yellow card) 90+5'	Report	Niskanen (yellow card) 19'; Mitchell (yellow card) 51'; Colwill (yellow card) 55'	Stadium: The Valley; Attendance: 14,864 (1,247 away); Referee: Andy Davies

1 March 2025 34	Exeter City	1–1	Northampton Town	Exeter
15:00 GMT	Niskanen (yellow card) 69'; Cox 87'; Watts (yellow card) 89'; Cole (yellow card) 89'	Report	Costelloe 42', (yellow card) 90'; Taylor (yellow card) 51'	Stadium: St James Park; Attendance: 6,834 (490 away); Referee: Charles Breakspear

4 March 2025 35	Reading	0–0	Exeter City	Reading
20:00 GMT		Report	Magennis (yellow card) 41'; Purrington (yellow card) 52'; Watts (yellow card) 53'; Aitchison (yellow card) 57'; A. MacDonald (yellow card) 90+8'	Stadium: Madejski Stadium; Attendance: 7,955 (448 away); Referee: Richard Eley

8 March 2025 36	Exeter City	2–0	Shrewsbury Town	Exeter
15:00 GMT	Purrington (yellow card) 23'; Magennis (penalty missed) 28'; Watts 29'; Jones (yellow card) 39'; Mitchell 48'; A. MacDonald (yellow card) 80'; Trevitt (yellow card) 87'	Report	Gape (yellow card) 73'; Oliver (yellow card) 80'; J. Feeney (yellow card) 90+4'	Stadium: St James Park; Attendance: 6,197 (369 away); Referee: Thomas Parsons

11 March 2025 11	Exeter City	2–0	Mansfield Town	Exeter
19:45 GMT	Mitchell 8'; A. MacDonald 49'; Francis (yellow card) 57'	Report	Bowery (yellow card) 38'	Stadium: St James Park; Attendance: 5,214 (259 away); Referee: Paul Howard
Note: Fixture was originally scheduled for 12 October and then 14 January, but was postponed on both occasions due to international call-ups and Mansfield's FA Cup involvement respectively.

15 March 2025 37	Rotherham United	1–1	Exeter City	Rotherham
15:00 GMT	James 45'	Report	Hartridge 56'; Watts (yellow card) 70'	Stadium: New York Stadium; Attendance: 8,438 (482 away); Referee: Martin Coy

22 March 2025 38	Lincoln City	0–0	Exeter City	Lincoln
15:00 GMT	Hackett-Fairchild (yellow card) 50'; Collins (yellow card) 81'	Report	Turns (yellow card) 4'; Whitworth (yellow card) 34'; Magennis (yellow card) 37'; Hartridge (yellow card) 89'	Stadium: Sincil Bank; Attendance: 8,971 (230 away); Referee: Declan Bourne

29 March 2025 39	Exeter City	0–2	Wrexham	Exeter
15:00 GMT	Cole (yellow card) 87'	Report	Rathbone 23'; Rodriguez 60' (pen.)	Stadium: St James Park; Attendance: 8,084 (920 away); Referee: Alex Chilowicz

1 April 2025 40	Barnsley	1–2	Exeter City	Barnsley
19:45 BST	Nwakali (yellow card) 33'; De Gevigney (yellow card) 42'; Humphrys 58'	Report	Trevitt 13'; Watts (yellow card) 45'; Magennis 81'	Stadium: Oakwell; Attendance: 10,092 (188 away); Referee: Will Finnie

5 April 2025 41	Exeter City	0–2	Stockport County	Exeter
15:00 BST	Watts (yellow card) 24'; Purrington (yellow card) 26'; Niskanen (yellow card) 51'	Report	Wootton 2', 22'; Olaofe (yellow card) 60'	Stadium: St James Park; Attendance: 6,541 (813 away); Referee: Benjamin Speedie

8 April 2025 31	Exeter City	1–1	Wigan Athletic	Exeter
19:45 BST	Fitzwater (yellow card) 33'; Cole 69'	Report	Weir (yellow card) 40'; Taylor 51' (pen.); S. Smith (yellow card) 65'; Adeeko (yellow card) 76'	Stadium: St James Park; Attendance: 5,382 (186 away); Referee: David Rock
Note: Fixture was initially scheduled for 8 February, but was rearranged due to both clubs in FA Cup involvements.

12 April 2025 42	Bristol Rovers	1–2	Exeter City	Horfield
15:00 BST	Sotiriou 70'; Sawyers (yellow card) 90+1'	Report	Watts 11', (yellow card) 56'; K. McDonald (yellow card) 32'; Cole 42'; Whitworth (yellow card) 79'; McMillan (yellow card) 87'	Stadium: Memorial Stadium; Attendance: 9,508 (1,359 away); Referee: Matthew Russell

18 April 2025 43	Exeter City	0–0	Burton Albion	Exeter
13:00 BST	K. McDonald (yellow card) 27'; Turns (yellow card) 55'; A. MacDonald (yellow card) 88'	Report	Sweeney (yellow card) 33'; Lofthouse (yellow card) 64'; Chauke (yellow card) 86'	Stadium: St James Park; Attendance: 6,972 (291 away); Referee: Jacob Miles
Note: Fixture was initially scheduled for a 15:00 kick-off, but was brought forward two hours following agreement between both clubs allowing an extra days recovering over the Easter period.

21 April 2025 44	Crawley Town	3–1	Exeter City	Crawley
15:00 BST	Hepburn-Murphy 7', 23'; Camará 9'; Radcliffe (yellow card) 41'; Kelly (yellow card) 54'; Fraser (yellow card) 78'	Report	Watts 25', (yellow card) 26'; Colwill (yellow card) 34'; Francis (yellow card) 54' (yellow-red card) 89'; Hartridge (yellow card) 62'	Stadium: Broadfield Stadium; Attendance: 4,441 (703 away); Referee: Ben Toner

26 April 2025 45	Exeter City	3–1	Huddersfield Town	Exeter
15:00 BST	Niskanen 39'; McMillan 56', (yellow card) 82'; Oluwabori 90+1'	Report	Koroma 20'; Turton (yellow card) 66'; Kane (yellow card) 79'	Stadium: St James Park; Attendance: 7,276 (731 away); Referee: Oliver Yates

3 May 2025 46	Mansfield Town	3–0	Exeter City	Mansfield
15:00 BST	McLaughlin 25'; Dwyer 38'; Waine 82'; Kokkinos (yellow card) 90+2'	Report		Stadium: Field Mill; Attendance: 7,494 (569 away); Referee: William Davis

=== FA Cup ===
Exeter City were drawn at home to Barnet in the first round, Chesterfield in the second round, Oxford United in the third round and Nottingham Forest in the fourth round.

Win Draw Loss Fixtures

2 November 2024 First round	Exeter City	5–3	Barnet	Exeter
15:00 GMT	Magennis 13', 76' (pen.), 85' (pen.); Woods (yellow card) 49'; Bird 90+6'; Doyle 90+11'	Report	Glover 39', (yellow card) 85'; Brunt 59'; Kanu (yellow card) 67'; Kabamba 78'; Coker (yellow card) 85'; Hobson (yellow card) 90+4'	Stadium: St James Park; Attendance: 4,244 (212 away); Referee: Lee Swabey

30 November 2024 Second round	Exeter City	2–0	Chesterfield	Exeter
15:00 GMT	Crama 45+2'; Woods (yellow card) 47'; Francis (yellow card) 54'; Magennis 69'	Report	Oldaker (yellow card) 48'	Stadium: St James Park; Attendance: 4,782 (456 away); Referee: Jacob Miles

11 January 2025 Third round	Exeter City	3–1	Oxford United	Exeter
15:00 GMT	Mitchell 22', 40'; Harper 64'; J. Richards (yellow card) 82'	Report	Phillips 14'; Scarlett (yellow card) 71'; Goodrham (red card) 81'; Sibley (yellow card) 85'; Ferdinan (yellow card) 90+5'	Stadium: St James Park; Attendance: 6,149 (640 away); Referee: Scott Oldham

11 February 2025 Fourth round	Exeter City	2–2 (a.e.t.) (2–4 p)	Nottingham Forest	Exeter
20:00 GMT	Magennis 5', 50'; McMillan (yellow card) 38'; Turns (red card) 87'; Yogane (yellow card) 115'	Report	Sosa 15'; Awoniyi 37'; Williams (yellow card) 105+1'	Stadium: St James Park; Attendance: 8,330 (1,354 away); Referee: Andrew Kitchen
	Penalties
	Magennis (penalty scored); Cole (penalty missed); A. MacDonald (penalty missed); Yogane (penalty scored)		(penalty scored) Wood; (penalty scored) Gibbs-White; (penalty scored) Anderson; (penalty scored) Williams

=== EFL Cup ===
On 27 June, the draw for the first round was made, with Exeter being drawn away against Walsall.

Win Draw Loss Fixtures

13 August 2024 First round	Walsall	1–1 (4–3 p)	Exeter City	Walsall
19:45 BST	J. Gordon (penalty missed) 81'; Jellis 90+3'; Stirk (yellow card) 90+4'	Report	Alli 40'; Cole (yellow card) 50'	Stadium: Bescot Stadium; Attendance: 2,352 (323 away); Referee: Jacob Miles
	Penalties
	Earing (penalty missed); Okagbue (penalty scored); Matt (penalty scored); L. Gordon (penalty scored); J. Gordon (penalty scored)		(penalty scored) Magennis; (penalty missed) Niskanen; (penalty missed) Alli; (penalty scored) Fitzwater; (penalty scored) Aitchison

=== EFL Trophy ===
In the group stage, Exeter were drawn into Southern Group G alongside Bristol Rovers, Swindon Town and Tottenham Hotspur. In the round of 32, Exeter were drawn at home to Birmingham City.

Pos	Div	Team	Pld	W	PW	PL	L	GF	GA	GD	Pts	Qualification
1	L1	Exeter City	3	3	0	0	0	7	3	+4	9	Advance to Round 2
2	L2	Swindon Town	3	2	0	0	1	7	3	+4	6	Advance to Round 2
3	ACA	Tottenham Hotspur U21	3	0	1	0	2	4	7	−3	2	
4	L1	Bristol Rovers	3	0	0	1	2	5	10	−5	1	

Source: EFL

Win Draw Loss Fixtures

3 September 2024 Group stage	Exeter City	2–1	Swindon Town	Exeter
19:00 BST	Francis 65'; Aitchison 81'	Report	Cotterill 68'; Minturn (yellow card) 71'; Smith (yellow card) 78'; Delaney (yellow card) 90+2'	Stadium: St. James Park; Attendance: 1,485 (97 away); Referee: Ross Martin

24 September 2024 Group stage	Exeter City	2–0	Tottenham Hotspur U21	Exeter
19:00 BST	Alli 56'; J. Richards (yellow card) 90+2', (goal) 90+4'	Report		Stadium: St. James Park; Attendance: 2,890 (541 away); Referee: Craig Hicks

29 October 2024 Group stage	Bristol Rovers	2–3	Exeter City	Bristol
19:00 GMT	Taylor 31'; Bilongo (yellow card) 33'; Hutchinson 67'; Forde (yellow card) 90'	Report	Bird 19'; Watts (yellow card) 35'; Francis (yellow card) 42'; Alli 49'; Mitchell 88'	Stadium: Memorial Stadium; Attendance: 1,257 (322 away); Referee: Matthew Russell

==== Knockout stages ====
10 December 2024 Round of 32	Exeter City	1–2	Birmingham City	Exeter
19:45 GMT	Sweeney 32'; Alli (yellow card) 40'; Cole (yellow card) 84'; Doyle (yellow card) 85'	Report	Harris 22'; Buchanan (yellow card) 58'; Anderson 78'; Yokoyama (yellow card) 90'; Peacock-Farrell (yellow card) 90+5'	Stadium: St James Park; Attendance: 1,986; Referee: Sam Mulhall
