= 2026–27 Blackpool F.C. season =

Blackpool
2026–27 season
- Owner: Simon Sadler
- Manager: Ian Evatt (Until 19 November 2026)
- Stadium: Bloomfield Road

The 2026–27 season is the 118th season in the history of Blackpool Football Club, and their fourth-consecutive season in League One, the third tier of English professional football. In addition to the domestic league, they also participate in the 2026–27 FA Cup, the EFL Cup, and the EFL Trophy.

== Pre-season friendlies ==
On 9 June, Pool announced two pre-season fixtures against AFC Fylde and Barrow. Ten days later, a trip to Tranmere Rovers was confirmed. On 26 June, a home friendly versus Port Vale was added.

Win Draw Loss Fixtures

11 July 2026 Friendly	AFC Fylde	2–3	Blackpool	Medlar-with-Wesham
15:00 BST	Allen-Hadley 72', 83'	Report	Bloxham 3'; Morgan 15'; Ennis 73'	Stadium: Mill Farm

18 July 2026 Friendly	Tranmere Rovers	2–0	Blackpool	Birkenhead
15:00 BST	Whitaker 32'; Davies 54'	Report		Stadium: Prenton Park

25 July 2026 Friendly	Barrow	2–0	Blackpool	Barrow-in-Furness
15:00 BST	Oakley (yellow card) 20'; Harper 40'; Cameron 78'	Report		Stadium: Holker Street

29 July 2026 Friendly	Blackpool	1–1	Blackburn Rovers	Blackpool
17:30 BST	Ennis 51'	Report	Morishita 31'	Stadium: Bloomfield Road; Attendance: 0 (BCD)

1 August 2026 Friendly	Blackpool	0–1	Port Vale	Blackpool
15:00 BST		Report	Moon 84'	Stadium: Bloomfield Road

== Competitions ==
=== League One ===
==== League table ====
Pos	Team	Pld	W	D	L	GF	GA	GD	Pts	Promotion, qualification or relegation
20	Doncaster Rovers	14	3	4	7	16	24	−8	13	
21	Peterborough United	14	3	4	7	13	23	−10	13	Relegation to EFL League Two
22	Blackpool	14	3	3	8	18	24	−6	12	Relegation to EFL League Two
23	Bromley	14	3	3	8	14	33	−19	12	Relegation to EFL League Two
24	Barnsley	14	2	3	9	14	26	−12	9	Relegation to EFL League Two

Updated to match(es) played on 21 November 2026. Source: EFL Official Website
Rules for classification: 1) Points; 2) Goal difference; 3) Number of goals scored; 4) Head-to-head results; 5) Wins; 6) Away goals; 7) Penalty points (sec 9.5); 8) 12-point sending off offences

==== Results summary ====
Overall								Home						Away					
Pld	W	D	L	GF	GA	GD	Pts	W	D	L	GF	GA	GD	W	D	L	GF	GA	GD
13	3	3	7	17	22	−5	12	2	2	2	12	11	+1	1	1	5	5	11	−6

Last updated: 14 November 2026.
Source: Soccerway

==== Matches ====
On 25 June, the League One fixtures were revealed.

Win Draw Loss Fixtures

15 August 2026 1	Blackpool	1–1	Wycombe Wanderers	Blackpool
15:00 BST	Coulson (yellow card) 16'; Morgan (yellow card) 64'; Munroe 77'	Report	Onyedinma 7', (yellow card) 80'; Henderson (yellow card) 27'; Harvie (yellow card) 84'	Stadium: Bloomfield Road; Attendance: 9,911; Referee: Seb Stockbridge

22 August 2026 2	Stockport County	1–2	Blackpool	Edgeley
15:00 BST	Glover (yellow card) 34'; Adigun (yellow card) 73'; Mandron 90+5'	Report	Bloxham 22'; Bowler 40'; Munroe (yellow card) 78'	Stadium: Edgeley Park; Attendance: 9,991 (1,154 away); Referee: Carl Brook

29 August 2026 3	Blackpool	4–0	Peterborough United	Blackpool
12:30 BST	Williams 19'; Charles 20'; Anderson 56'; Yates 72'	Report		Stadium: Bloomfield Road; Attendance: 9,327; Referee: Martin Coy
Note: Fixture was initially scheduled for a 15:00 kick-off, but was brought forward for live Sky Sports broadcasting.

2 September 2026 4	Barnsley	2–1	Blackpool	Barnsley
19:45 BST	McGeehan 61'; Key (yellow card) 78'; Richards 87'; Kelly (yellow card) 90'; Farrell (yellow card) 90'	Report	Honeyman (yellow card) 37'; Munroe (yellow card) 60'; Bowler 65'; Hamilton (yellow card) 72'; Anderson (yellow card) 90+1'	Stadium: Oakwell; Referee: Jamie O'Connor
Note: Fixture was initially scheduled for 1 September, but was pushed back 24-hours.

5 September 2026 5	Reading	3–1	Blackpool	Reading
15:00 BST	Earthy 12'; Lisbie 49'; Brown 90+4'	Report	J.Williams (yellow card) 16'; Clarkson 80'	Stadium: Select Car Leasing Stadium; Attendance: 11,597; Referee: David Rock

12 September 2026 6	Blackpool	2–2	Bromley	Blackpool
15:00 BST	Morgan 10'; Bloxham 44'	Report	Adeboyejo 18'; Mason (yellow card) 43'; Brown 55' (o.g.)	Stadium: Bloomfield Road; Referee: Ben Speedie

19 September 2026 7	Blackpool	2–4	Plymouth Argyle	Blackpool
15:00 BST	Brown 30'; Yates (yellow card) 38', (goal) 70'; Williams (yellow card) 47'; Anderson (yellow card) 71'		Irow 36', 52'; White 57'; Pepple 89'	Stadium: Bloomfield Road; Referee: Darren Drysdale

10 October 2026 10	Cambridge United	1–0	Blackpool	Cambridge
15:15 BST	Ahadme 82'; Kaikai (yellow card) 86'	Report	Honeyman (red card) 6'; Casey (yellow card) 31'; Munroe (yellow card) 90+4'	Stadium: Cledara Abbey Stadium; Attendance: 7,295; Referee: Lewis Sandoe
Note: Kick-off was delayed by fifteen minutes due to delays affecting supporters entering the stadium.

17 October 2026 11	Leyton Orient	2–0	Blackpool	Leyton
15:00 BST	Forrester 31'; El Mizouni (yellow card) 67'; Scarlett 76' (pen.)		Bowler (yellow card) 20'; Ashworth (yellow card) 38'; Munroe (yellow card) 74'	Stadium: BetWright Stadium; Referee: John Busby

20 October 2026 12	Blackpool	2–0	Milton Keynes Dons	Blackpool
19:45 BST	Casey (yellow card) 31'; Morgan (yellow card) 65'; Anderson 69'; Taylor 77'	Report	Wintle (yellow card) 18'; Nombe (yellow card) 87'	Stadium: Bloomfield Road; Attendance: 8,104; Referee: Jamie Robinson

24 October 2026 13	Blackpool	1–4	Mansfield Town	Blackpool
15:00 BST	Morgan (yellow card) 14'; Charles 42'; Anderson (yellow card) 45+1'	Report	Smith 17'; Hewitt (yellow card) 52'; Oates 55'; Niskanen 64' (o.g.); Roberts 78'	Stadium: Bloomfield Road; Attendance: 10,110; Referee: Ollie Yates

1 November 2026 14	Sheffield Wednesday	1–1	Blackpool	Owlerton
14:00 GMT	Keillor-Dunn 25'; Burstow (yellow card) 38'; Swinkels (red card) 40'; Bannan (yellow card) 84'; Gray (yellow card) 90+4'	Report	Niskanen (yellow card) 79'; Yates 81'; Williams (yellow card) 82'; Bowler (yellow card) 84'	Stadium: Hillsborough; Attendance: 30,674; Referee: Simon Mather
Note: Fixture was initially scheduled for 31 October, but was rescheduled to the following day.

14 November 2026 15	AFC Wimbledon	1–0	Blackpool	Wimbledon
15:00 GMT	Smith 13', (yellow card) 87'; Tilley (yellow card) 72'; Stockley (yellow card) 90+4'	Report	Morgan (yellow card) 83'; Yates (yellow card) 90+3'	Stadium: Cherry Red Records Stadium; Attendance: 8,332; Referee: Oliver Mackey

21 November 2026 16	Blackpool	1–2	Wigan Athletic	Blackpool
12:30 GMT	Ashworth 42', (yellow card) 66'; Casey (yellow card) 80'	Report	Burns (yellow card) 26', (goal) 63'; Mellish 44'	Stadium: Bloomfield Road; Attendance: 10,622; Referee: Matthew Corlett
Note: Fixture was initially scheduled for a 15:00 kick-off, but was brought forward for live Sky Sports broadcasting.

24 November 2026 9	Blackpool	v	Leicester City	Blackpool
19:45 GMT				Stadium: Bloomfield Road
Note: Fixture was initially scheduled for 3 October, but was rearranged due to international call-ups.

28 November 2026 17	Stevenage	v	Blackpool	Stevenage
15:00 GMT				Stadium: Stevenage FC Stadium

1 December 2026 18	Blackpool	v	Luton Town	Blackpool
19:45 GMT				Stadium: Bloomfield Road

12 December 2026 19	Oxford United	v	Blackpool	Littlemore
15:00 GMT				Stadium: The Kassam Stadium

19 December 2026 20	Blackpool	v	Burton Albion	Blackpool
15:00 GMT				Stadium: Bloomfield Road

26 December 2026 21	Huddersfield Town	v	Blackpool	Huddersfield
15:00 GMT				Stadium: Accu Stadium

29 December 2026 22	Blackpool	v	Bradford City	Blackpool
19:45 GMT				Stadium: Bloomfield Road

1 January 2027 23	Blackpool	v	Doncaster Rovers	Blackpool
15:00 GMT				Stadium: Bloomfield Road

8 January 2027 24	Burton Albion	v	Blackpool	Burton upon Trent
20:00 GMT				Stadium: Pirelli Stadium
Note: Fixture was initially scheduled for 9 January, but was brought forward to the night prior for live Sky Sports broadcasting.

12 January 2027 8	Notts County	v	Blackpool	Nottingham
19:45 GMT				Stadium: Meadow Lane
Note: Fixture was originally scheduled for 26 September, but it was postponed due to international call-ups. It was later rescheduled for 12 January.

=== FA Cup ===
Blackpool were drawn away to Hornchurch in the first round and to Salisbury in the second round.

Win Draw Loss Fixtures

7 November 2026 First round	Hornchurch	1–2 (a.e.t.)	Blackpool	Upminster
15:00 GMT	Hearn 30'; Weston (yellow card) 58'; Pegrum (yellow card) 63'; Sandat (red card) 113'; Rowe (yellow card) 120+1'	Report	Brown 56'; Bowler 118'	Stadium: Hornchurch Stadium; Referee: Harrison Blair

6 December 2026 Second round	Salisbury	v	Blackpool	Salisbury
12:15 GMT				Stadium: Raymond McEnhill Stadium
Note: Fixture was selected for live TNT Sports, HBO Max and BBC broadcasting.

=== EFL Cup ===
Blackpool were drawn away to Grimsby Town in the first round and home to Lincoln City in the second round.

Win Draw Loss Fixtures

8 August 2026 First round	Grimsby Town	1–3	Blackpool	Cleethorpes
15:00 BST	Rodgers 90+2'	Report	Ennis 3'; Williams (yellow card) 55'; Bowler 58'; Kouassi 90+5'	Stadium: Blundell Park; Attendance: 4,817; Referee: Neil Hair

25 August 2026 Second round	Blackpool	1–4	Lincoln City	Blackpool
19:45 BST	Ashworth (yellow card) 31' (red card) 52'; Clarkson 45'		Olaofe 36'; Bayliss 53'; Street 55'; Elder 77'	Stadium: Bloomfield Road; Attendance: 2,407; Referee: Harry Wager

=== EFL Trophy ===
==== Group stage ====
Blackpool were drawn against Wigan Athletic, Crewe Alexandra and Aston Villa U21 into Northern Group B.

Pos	Div	Team	Pld	W	PW	PL	L	GF	GA	GD	Pts	Qualification
1	L1	Wigan Athletic	3	3	0	0	0	8	5	+3	9	Advance to Round 2
2	L1	Blackpool	3	1	1	0	1	7	7	0	5	Advance to Round 2
3	L2	Crewe Alexandra	3	1	0	1	1	7	5	+2	4	
4	ACA	Aston Villa U21	3	0	0	0	3	5	10	−5	0	

Source: EFL

Win Draw Loss Fixtures

22 September 2026 Group stage	Wigan Athletic	3–2	Blackpool	Wigan
19:00 BST	Barrett 3'; Hogan 57'; Murray 78'; Mellish (yellow card) 89'; Power (yellow card) 90+4'	Report	Lyons (yellow card) 39'; Bloxham 72' (pen.); Yates 90'; Earl (yellow card) 90+4'	Stadium: Brick Community Stadium; Attendance: 1,496; Referee: Garreth Rhodes

6 October 2026 Group stage	Blackpool	1–1 (4–2 p)	Crewe Alexandra	Blackpool
19:00 BST	Morgan 46', 53'	Report	Gibson 30'; McNeill (yellow card) 72', (goal) 80' (pen.); Thibaut (yellow card) 73'; Roberts (yellow card) 74'	Stadium: Bloomfield Road; Attendance: 915; Referee: Steven Copeland
	Penalties
	Yates (penalty scored); Taylor (penalty scored); Clarkson (penalty scored); Munroe (penalty scored)		McNeill (penalty scored); Thibaut (penalty missed); Dancey (penalty missed); Roberts (penalty scored)

27 October 2026 Group stage	Blackpool	3–2	Aston Villa U21	Blackpool
19:00 GMT	Brown (yellow card) 31', (goal) 79'; Ashworth 42', (yellow card) 49'; Yates 71' (pen.); Morgan (yellow card) 87'	Report	Boyd 29'; Routh (yellow card) 46'; Burgess (yellow card) 83'; Meade 90+4'	Stadium: Bloomfield Road

== Transfers and contracts ==
=== In ===
Date	Pos.	Player	From	Fee	Ref.
1 July 2026 (Note: The transfer was announced on 27 June, and would become official on July 1 once Niskanen's contract at Exeter City expired.)	RM	(Finland) Ilmari Niskanen	(England) Exeter City	Free	
21 July 2026	CM	(Jamaica) Karoy Anderson	(England) Charlton Athletic	Undisclosed	
11 August 2026	GK	(Northern Ireland) Luke Southwood	(England) Bristol Rovers	Undisclosed	
26 August 2026	CB	(England) Josh Earl	(England) Barnsley	Undisclosed	

=== Loaned in ===
Date	Pos.	Player	From	Loaned until	Ref.
27 June 2026	CF	(Northern Ireland) Dion Charles	(England) Huddersfield Town	End of Season	
29 July 2026	RB	(England) Jordan Williams	(England) Portsmouth	End of Season	
10 August 2026	LB	(England) Finley Munroe	(England) Middlesbrough	End of Season	
26 August 2026	CF	(England) Jerry Yates	(England) Luton Town	End of Season	

=== Loaned out ===
Date	Pos.	Player	To	Loaned until	Ref.
4 August 2026	CF	(England) James Butterworth	(England) Bamber Bridge	2 January 2027	
7 August 2026	CAM	(England) Spencer Knight	(England) Ashton United	2 January 2027	
18 August 2026	CF	(England) Billy Whaite	(England) Warrington Rylands	15 September 2026	
21 August 2026	CAM	(England) Theo Upton	(England) AFC Fylde	End of Season	
25 September 2026	GK	(England) Charlie Brier	(England) Bamber Bridge	25 October 2026	
29 October 2026	CF	(England) Billy Whaite	(England) Ashton United	2 January 2027	

=== Out ===
Date	Pos.	Player	To	Fee	Ref.
27 June 2026	CM	(England) Ryan Finnigan	(Scotland) Dundee	Undisclosed	
10 August 2026	GK	(Argentina) Franco Ravizzoli	(England) Leicester City	Free transfer	
1 September 2026	CF	(England) Kylian Kouassi	(England) Colchester United	Undisclosed	

=== Released / out of contract ===
Date	Pos.	Player	Subsequent club	Joined date	Ref.
30 June 2026	CF	(England) Ashley Fletcher	(England) Huddersfield Town	1 July 2026	
30 June 2026	LB	(England) James Husband	(England) Doncaster Rovers	1 July 2026	
30 June 2026	CB	(England) Dan Sassi	(Wales) Newport County	1 July 2026	
30 June 2026	GK	(England) Harvey Bardsley			
30 June 2026	CF	(England) Terry Bondo	(England) Hartlepool United		
30 June 2026	LB	(England) Derek Oshodi			
30 June 2026	CDM	(England) Harry Williamson			

=== New contract ===
Date	Pos.	Player	Contract expiry	Ref.
5 May 2026	CB	(England) Oliver Casey	30 June 2027	
5 May 2026	CM	(England) Ryan Finnigan	30 June 2027	
5 May 2026	LW	(Republic of Ireland) CJ Hamilton	30 June 2027	
5 May 2026	CF	(England) Kylian Kouassi	30 June 2027	
5 May 2026	RB	(Republic of Ireland) Andy Lyons	30 June 2027	
5 May 2026	CM	(England) Albie Morgan	30 June 2027	
29 May 2026	GK	(Northern Ireland) Bailey Peacock-Farrell	30 June 2027 (Note: Includes club option for an additional one-year)	
1 July 2026 (Note: The contract was announced on 18 May, and would officially commence on July 1.)	GK	(England) Charlie Brier	30 June 2027 (Note: First professional contract)	
1 July 2026	GK	(England) Kai Crowe	30 June 2027	
1 July 2026	CB	(England) George Elder	30 June 2028	
1 July 2026	CF	(England) Shay Mannix	30 June 2028	
15 September 2026	RB	(England) Ollie Hunter	30 June 2028	

== Statistics ==
=== Appearances and goals ===
As of match played 14 November 2026

Only players with appearances are included in the list; italics indicate a loaned in player

No.	Pos	Nat	Player	Total		League One		FA Cup		EFL Cup		EFL Trophy	
No.	Pos	Nat	Player	Apps	Goals	Apps	Goals	Apps	Goals	Apps	Goals	Apps	Goals
1	GK	(Northern Ireland) NIR	Bailey Peacock-Farrell	15	0	12+0	0	1+0	0	2+0	0	0+0	0
2	DF	(Republic of Ireland) IRL	Andy Lyons	9	0	1+2	0	1+0	0	1+1	0	2+1	0
3	DF	(Wales) WAL	Zac Ashworth	16	1	9+1	0	1+0	0	2+0	0	3+0	1
4	DF	(England) ENG	Oliver Casey	19	0	13+0	0	1+0	0	2+0	0	2+1	0
5	DF	(England) ENG	Fraser Horsfall	1	0	0+0	0	0+0	0	0+0	0	0+1	0
6	MF	(England) ENG	Jordan Brown	13	3	4+4	1	1+0	1	1+0	0	3+0	1
7	MF	(England) ENG	Leighton Clarkson	18	2	4+8	1	0+1	0	1+1	1	3+0	0
8	MF	(England) ENG	Albie Morgan	17	3	11+1	1	1+0	0	0+1	0	1+2	2
9	FW	(England) ENG	Niall Ennis	2	1	0+1	0	0+0	0	1+0	1	0+0	0
10	MF	(England) ENG	George Honeyman	9	0	7+0	0	0+0	0	1+1	0	0+0	0
11	FW	(England) ENG	Josh Bowler	18	4	11+1	2	0+1	1	2+0	1	1+2	0
12	FW	(England) ENG	Jerry Yates	15	5	5+6	3	1+0	0	0+0	0	2+1	2
14	FW	(England) ENG	Tom Bloxham	18	3	10+3	2	0+1	0	1+0	0	2+1	1
15	DF	(England) ENG	Hayden Coulson	8	0	3+2	0	0+0	0	2+0	0	1+0	0
17	MF	(Jamaica) JAM	Karoy Anderson	14	2	12+0	2	1+0	0	1+0	0	0+0	0
18	FW	(Northern Ireland) NIR	Dale Taylor	8	1	3+2	1	0+1	0	0+0	0	2+0	0
19	FW	(Northern Ireland) NIR	Dion Charles	15	2	6+7	2	1+0	0	0+0	0	1+0	0
21	DF	(Finland) FIN	Ilmari Niskanen	12	0	3+4	0	1+0	0	1+0	0	2+1	0
22	MF	(Republic of Ireland) IRL	CJ Hamilton	7	0	3+2	0	0+0	0	2+0	0	0+0	0
23	GK	(Northern Ireland) NIR	Luke Southwood	4	0	1+0	0	0+0	0	0+0	0	3+0	0
26	DF	(England) ENG	Finley Munroe	17	1	5+7	1	0+1	0	1+0	0	3+0	0
28	DF	(England) ENG	Jordan Williams	18	1	13+0	1	1+0	0	1+1	0	1+1	0
29	MF	(England) ENG	Theo Upton	2	0	0+0	0	0+0	0	0+0	0	1+1	0
32	DF	(England) ENG	Josh Earl	5	0	4+0	0	0+0	0	0+0	0	1+0	0
Players who featured but departed the club permanently during the season:
27	FW	(England) ENG	Kylian Kouassi	4	1	1+1	0	0+0	0	0+2	1	0+0	0

== Awards ==
=== EFL awards ===
==== EFL League One Manager of the Month ====
Month	Player		Ref.
August	(England) Ian Evatt	Nominated	

==== EFL League One Player of the Month ====
Month	Player		Ref.
August	(Northern Ireland) Bailey Peacock-Farrell	Nominated	
