= Ilmari Niskanen =

Finnish footballer (born 1997)

Personal information
- Full name: Ilmari Matias Niskanen
- Date of birth: 27 October 1997 (age 29)
- Place of birth: Kiuruvesi, Finland
- Height: 1.77 m (5 ft 10 in)
- Positions: Left winger; wing back

Team information
- Current team: Blackpool
- Number: 21

Youth career
- Kiuruveden Palloilijat
- –2013: PK-37

Senior career*
Years	Team	Apps	(Gls)
2013–2020	KuPS	154	(18)
2013	→ PK-37 (loan)	22	(9)
2014	→ KuFu-98	7	(0)
2014	→ PK-37 (loan)	1	(0)
2017	→ KuFu-98	1	(1)
2020–2021	FC Ingolstadt	20	(0)
2021–2023	Dundee United	53	(2)
2023–2026	Exeter City	119	(5)
2026–	Blackpool	6	(0)

International career^{‡}
- Finland U17
2015	Finland U19	3	(0)
2017–2018	Finland U21	6	(0)
2020–	Finland	23	(1)
- * Club domestic league appearances and goals as of 19:02, 14 November 2026 (UTC) ‡ National team caps and goals as of 17 November 2024

Ilmari Matias Niskanen (born 27 October 1997) is a Finnish professional footballer who plays as a left winger and wing back for EFL League One club Blackpool and the Finland national team.

== Club career ==
Born in Kiuruvesi, Niskanen spent his youth years with PK-37 in Iisalmi, before starting his professional career in 2013 in a nearby town Kuopio with Kuopion Palloseura (KuPS). In the 2019 Veikkausliiga season, Niskanen helped the club to win its first Finnish championship title in 43 years. He was also named the Veikkausliiga Player of the Month in August 2019 and in July 2020.

In September 2020, Niskanen signed for German club FC Ingolstadt for a transfer fee of €350,000.

In August 2021, Niskanen had a transfer to Scottish Premiership club Dundee United, which was initially delayed due to work permit issues, before eventually completing on 20 August 2021. The transfer fee was reported to be €350,000.

On 15 August 2023, Niskanen signed for League One club Exeter City for an undisclosed fee. On 29 April 2024, Niskanen was named the Exeter City Community Champion in the club's end of season awards. On 15 May 2024, his deal was extended until June 2026. He was named the Exeter City Player of the Month in October 2024. At the end of the 2024–25 season, Niskanen received an award from Exeter City's supporters for his extensive interaction in the fan-zone area throughout the season.

He was released by Exeter at the end of the 2025–26 season.

On 27 June 2026, he joined Blackpool on a two-year contract with the option of a further year, from 1 July.

== International career ==
Niskanen represented Finland at under-17, under-19 and under-21 youth levels, before making his senior international debut in 2020.

On 10 September 2024, in a 2024–25 UEFA Nations League B away match against England, Niskanen was humiliated by the national team head coach Markku Kanerva, by substituting him in for the second half to a wrong position for his expertise. Later Finland conceded goals directly due to Niskanen's errors and eventually lost the game 2–0.

== Personal life ==
On 19 February 2025, it was reported that Niskanen had been caught by English police while driving under the influence of alcohol earlier in February. On 24 February, he was fined £2,885 and banned from driving for 18 months, by the Exeter Magistrates Court.

== Career statistics ==
=== Club ===
As of match played 14 November 2026

Appearances and goals by club, season and competition
Club	Season	League			National cup (Note: Includes Suomen Cup, DFB-Pokal, Scottish Cup and FA Cup)		League cup (Note: Includes Finnish League Cup, Scottish League Cup and EFL League Cup)		Continental		Other		Total	
Club	Season	Division	Apps	Goals	Apps	Goals	Apps	Goals	Apps	Goals	Apps	Goals	Apps	Goals
KuPS	2013	Veikkausliiga	1	0	0	0	0	0	—		—		1	0
KuPS	2014	Veikkausliiga	4	1	0	0	0	0	—		—		4	1
KuPS	2015	Veikkausliiga	20	1	1	0	0	0	—		—		21	1
KuPS	2016	Veikkausliiga	25	0	1	0	0	0	—		—		26	0
KuPS	2017	Veikkausliiga	32	1	6	2	—		—		—		38	3
KuPS	2018	Veikkausliiga	33	4	6	4	—		2 (Note: Appearances in UEFA Europa League)	0	—		41	8
KuPS	2019	Veikkausliiga	26	5	5	1	—		4	0	—		35	6
KuPS	2020	Veikkausliiga	13	6	5	1	—		2 (Note: One appearance in the UEFA Champions League and one appearance in UEFA Europa League)	0	—		20	7
KuPS	Total		154	18	24	8	0	0	8	0	0	0	186	26
PK-37 (loan)	2013	Kakkonen	22	9	2	0	—		—		—		24	9
KuFu-98 (loan)	2014	Kakkonen	7	0	–		—		—		—		7	0
KuFu-98 (loan)	2015	Kolmonen	0	0	—		—		—		1 (Note: Appearance(s) in UEFA Regions' Cup)	0	1	0
KuFu-98 (loan)	Total		7	0	0	0	0	0	0	0	1	0	8	0
PK-37 (loan)	2014	Kakkonen	1	0	—		—		—		—		1	0
KuFu-98 (loan)	2017	Kakkonen	1	1	—		—		—		—		1	1
FC Ingolstadt	2020–21	3. Liga	20	0	0	0	—		—		—		20	0
FC Ingolstadt	2021–22	2. Bundesliga	0	0	1	0	—		—		—		1	0
FC Ingolstadt	Total		20	0	1	0	0	0	0	0	0	0	21	0
Dundee United	2021–22	Scottish Premiership	33	1	3	0	0	0	—		—		36	1
Dundee United	2022–23	Scottish Premiership	20	1	2	0	0	0	2 (Note: Appearances in UEFA Europa Conference League)	0	—		24	1
Dundee United	2023–24	Scottish Championship	0	0	0	0	1	0	—		—		1	0
Dundee United	Total		53	2	5	0	1	0	2	0	0	0	61	2
Exeter City	2023–24	League One	33	0	0	0	1	0	—		1 (Note: Appearance(s) in EFL Trophy)	0	35	0
Exeter City	2024–25	League One	40	2	3	0	1	0	—		1	0	45	2
Exeter City	2025–26	League One	46	3	3	0	0	0	—		3	0	52	3
Exeter City	Total		119	5	6	0	2	0	0	0	5	0	132	5
Blackpool	2026–27	League One	6	0	1	0	1	0	—		3	0	11	0
Career total			383	35	39	8	4	0	10	0	9	0	445	43

=== International ===
As of match played 17 November 2024

Appearances and goals by national team and year
National team	Year	Apps	Goals
Finland	2020	6	1
Finland	2021	1	0
Finland	2022	6	0
Finland	2023	3	0
Finland	2024	7	0
Total		23	1

Finland score listed first, score column indicates score after each Niskanen goal

List of international goals scored by Ilmari Niskanen
No.	Date	Venue	Cap	Opponent	Score	Result	Competition	Ref.
1	7 October 2020	Stadion Gdańsk, Gdańsk, Poland	2	Poland	1–3	1–5	Friendly	

== Honours ==
KuPS

- Veikkausliiga: 2019
- Veikkausliiga runner-up: 2017
- Finnish Cup runner-up: 2013

Individual

- Veikkausliiga Player of the Month: August 2019, July 2020
- Exeter City: ECCT PFA Community Champion 2023–24
- Exeter City Player of the Month: October 2024
