= Millenic Alli =

Irish professional footballer (born 2000)

Personal information
- Full name: Millenic Oluwole Sulaiman Alli
- Date of birth: 6 February 2000 (age 26)
- Place of birth: Dublin, Ireland
- Height: 1.76 m (5 ft 9 in)
- Position: Winger

Team information
- Current team: Charlton Athletic
- Number: 19

Youth career
- Esker Celtic
- St Francis
- Bury

Senior career*
Years	Team	Apps	(Gls)
2019–2020	South Shields	6	(0)
2019	→ Workington (loan)	2	(0)
2020	→ Workington (loan)	7	(4)
2020–2021	Ashton United	6	(1)
2021–2022	Stockport County	0	(0)
2021–2022	→ Chorley (loan)	33	(4)
2022–2024	FC Halifax Town	54	(16)
2024–2025	Exeter City	35	(13)
2025–2026	Luton Town	32	(5)
2026	→ Portsmouth (loan)	21	(1)
2026–	Charlton Athletic	14	(1)

International career^{‡}
2026–	Republic of Ireland	1	(0)
- * Club domestic league appearances and goals as of 17:10, 21 November 2026 (UTC) ‡ National team caps and goals as of 21:33, 16 May 2026 (UTC)

Millenic Oluwole Sulaiman Alli (born 6 February 2000) is an Irish professional footballer who plays as a winger for EFL Championship club Charlton Athletic and the Republic of Ireland national team.

== Career ==
Born in Dublin, Alli was raised in the suburb of Lucan and began playing football with local club Esker Celtic before moving to St Francis. At the age of 14, he moved to England and signed for the academy of Bury before playing in non-league with South Shields, where he spent two spells on loan at Workington, the first in late 2019 and the second in early 2020.

After playing for Ashton United, he signed for Stockport County, spending time on loan at Chorley. After his release by Stockport, he signed for FC Halifax Town in July 2022.

He signed for Exeter City in January 2024, being described as "one of non-League's hottest talents".

On 30 January 2025, Alli signed for Championship club Luton Town for an undisclosed fee, reported to be £1.5 million.

In January 2026, he moved on loan to Portsmouth.

On 26 July 2026, Alli joined Charlton Athletic on a four-year contract.

== International career ==
On 29 March 2026, Alli received his first call-up to the Republic of Ireland national team, as a late member of the squad for the friendly against North Macedonia. On 16 May 2026, Alli made his senior Republic of Ireland debut, replacing Adam Idah from the bench in a 5–0 win over Grenada in a friendly.

== Career statistics ==
As of match played 21 November 2026

Appearances and goals by club, season and competition
Club	Season	League			FA Cup		League Cup		Other		Total	
Club	Season	Division	Apps	Goals	Apps	Goals	Apps	Goals	Apps	Goals	Apps	Goals
South Shields	2019–20	Northern Premier League	6	0	3	0	—		1 (Note: Appearance in the Durham Senior Cup)	0	10	0
Workington (loan)	2019–20	Northern Premier League	2	0	0	0	—		0	0	2	0
Workington (loan)	2019–20	Northern Premier League	7	4	0	0	—		1 (Note: Appearance in League Challenge Cup)	0	8	4
Ashton United	2020–21	Northern Premier League	6	1	2	0	—		4 (Note: Appearance(s) in FA Trophy)	1	12	2
Stockport County	2021–22	National League	0	0	0	0	—		1	0	1	0
Chorley (loan)	2021–22	National League North	33	4	0	0	—		0	0	33	4
FC Halifax Town	2022–23	National League	33	9	0	0	—		6	2	39	11
FC Halifax Town	2023–24	National League	21	7	1	0	—		1	0	23	7
FC Halifax Town	Total		54	16	1	0	0	0	7	2	62	18
Exeter City	2023–24	League One	10	4	0	0	0	0	0	0	10	4
Exeter City	2024–25	League One	25	9	3	0	1	1	4 (Note: Appearances in EFL Trophy)	2	33	12
Exeter City	Total		35	13	3	0	1	1	4	2	43	16
Luton Town	2024–25	Championship	16	4	—		—		—		16	4
Luton Town	2025–26	League One	16	1	1	0	1	0	4	0	22	1
Luton Town	Total		32	5	1	0	1	0	4	0	38	5
Portsmouth (loan)	2025–26	Championship	21	1	0	0	0	0	—		21	1
Charlton Athletic	2026–27	Championship	14	1	0	0	2	0	—		16	1
Career total			210	45	10	0	4	1	22	5	246	51

=== International ===
As of match played on 16 May 2026

Appearances and goals by national team and year
National team	Year	Apps	Goals
Republic of Ireland
Republic of Ireland	2026	1	0
Total		1	0
