= Johnly Yfeko =

Scottish footballer (born 2003)

Personal information
- Full name: Johnly Levi Yfeko
- Date of birth: 23 June 2003 (age 23)
- Place of birth: Newham, England
- Height: 1.91 m (6 ft 3 in)
- Positions: Centre-back; left-back

Team information
- Current team: Kilmarnock
- Number: 15

Youth career
- Tottenham Hotspur
- Leicester City
- 2022–2025: Rangers

Senior career*
Years	Team	Apps	(Gls)
2022–2025	Rangers	0	(0)
2024–2025	→ Exeter City (loan)	12	(0)
2025–2026	Exeter City	14	(0)
2026–	Kilmarnock	2	(0)
- * Club domestic league appearances and goals as of 17:15, September 7, 2025 (UTC)

Johnly Levi Yfeko (born 23 June 2003) is an English professional footballer who plays as a centre-back or left-back for Scottish Premiership club Kilmarnock. He previously had spells with Exeter City F.C. and Rangers, as well as the academies of both Tottenham Hotspur and Leicester City

== Career ==
Yfeko started his career in the youth ranks of Tottenham Hotspur before being picked up by Leicester City. Yfeko signed for Leicester City and was a key defender for the Under-18s and 23s before being released in the summer of 2021. After being released he went on trial at Southampton's Under-18s but was not signed.

=== Rangers ===
In January 2022, Yfeko signed for Rangers on a short-term deal, however, he impressed significantly to earn an extension until the summer of 2024.

He made appearances regularly playing for Rangers B.

=== Exeter City (loan) ===
On 23 July 2024, Yfeko joined Exeter City on a season-long loan, with an option to buy.

=== Exeter City ===
On 5 May 2025, Yfeko made his loan move to Exeter City permanent as the club triggered the option-to-buy option is his loan contract. The fee was undisclosed.

=== Kilmarnock ===
On 31 July 2026, Yfeko returned to Scotland, joining Scottish Premiership club Kilmarnock on a two-year deal for an undisclosed fee.

== Career statistics ==
As of match played 16 September 2025

Appearances and goals by club, season and competition
Club	Season	League			National cup (Note: Includes Scottish Cup, FA Cup)		League cup (Note: Includes Scottish League Cup, EFL Cup)		Continental		Other		Total	
Club	Season	Division	Apps	Goals	Apps	Goals	Apps	Goals	Apps	Goals	Apps	Goals	Apps	Goals
Rangers B	2023-24	—			—		—		—		3 (Note: Appearance(s) in Scottish Challenge Cup)	0	3	0
Rangers	2023-24	Scottish Premiership	0	0	0	0	1	0	0	0	—		1	0
Rangers	2024-25	Scottish Premiership	0	0	0	0	0	0	0	0	—		0	0
Rangers	Total		0	0	0	0	1	0	0	0	—		1	0
Exeter City (loan)	2024-25	League One	12	0	1	0	0	0	—		0	0	13	0
Exeter City	2025-26	League One	0	0	0	0	0	0	—		1 (Note: Appearance(s) in EFL Trophy)	0	1	0
Career total			12	0	1	0	1	0	0	0	4	0	18	0
