= Edward Francis (footballer) =

English footballer (born 1999)

Personal information
- Full name: Edward Albert Francis
- Date of birth: 11 September 1999 (age 27)
- Place of birth: Poynton, England
- Height: 6 ft 0 in (1.82 m)
- Position: Midfielder

Team information
- Current team: Rochdale
- Number: 14

Youth career
- –2018: Manchester City

Senior career*
Years	Team	Apps	(Gls)
2018–2019	Manchester City	0	(0)
2018–2019	→ Jong Almere City (loan)	8	(1)
2018–2019	→ Almere City (loan)	1	(0)
2019–2020	Wolverhampton Wanderers	0	(0)
2020	→ Grasshopper (loan)	0	(0)
2020–2021	Harrogate Town	20	(1)
2021–2023	Notts County	41	(2)
2023	→ Gateshead (loan)	14	(0)
2023–2024	Gateshead	40	(3)
2024–2026	Exeter City	51	(2)
2026–	Rochdale	12	(0)

International career
2015	England U16	1	(0)
2014–2016	England U17	16	(0)
2017	England U18	1	(0)
2017–2018	England U19	4	(0)
2024	England C	1	(0)
- * Club domestic league appearances and goals as of 16 May 2026 (UTC)

Edward Albert Francis (born 11 September 1999) is an English footballer who plays as a midfielder for EFL League Two club Rochdale.

== Club career ==
Francis was born in Poynton and came through the academy system at Manchester City, joining them in the under-6 year-group. He captained the club's under-18 side in the final of the 2016–17 FA Youth Cup final against Chelsea, standing in for Joel Latibeaudiere, which City lost 6–2 on aggregate.

Having graduated from the academy in summer 2018, Francis joined Dutch Eerste Divisie side Almere City on loan for the 2018–19 season. During his time there he played predominantly for their development side, Jong Almere City, in the Tweede Divisie.

Francis was signed by Premier League side Wolverhampton Wanderers in January 2019 for an undisclosed fee. He signed a two-and-a-half-year with the option of a further year. On 18 February 2020, he was loaned out to Swiss club Grasshopper Club Zürich until the end of the season.

On 15 December 2020, Francis signed for EFL League Two side Harrogate Town.

On 20 July 2021, Francis joined National League side Notts County on a two-year deal.

Following Notts County's promotion to the Football League at the end of the 2022–23 season, Francis was released by the club. Having impressed the previous season on loan at Gateshead, he returned to the club on a permanent basis in June 2023, signing a two-year contract.

In January 2024 he was hospitalised after fracturing his skull during a match. Francis started for Gateshead in the 2024 FA Trophy final win against Solihull Moors at Wembley Stadium.

On 4 July 2024, Francis signed for League One side Exeter City for an undisclosed fee, signing a two-year deal with a club option to extend for a third.

On 10 February 2026, Francis returned to the National League, joining leaders Rochdale on a two-and-a-half year deal for an undisclosed fee.

== International career ==
Francis was called up to represent the England C team in March 2024. On 19 March, he made his debut in the 1–0 defeat to the Wales C team at Stebonheath Park.

== Career statistics ==
As of match played on 6 September 2025

Club	Season	League			National Cup (Note: Includes appearances in KNVB Cup and FA Cup)		League Cup		Other		Total	
Club	Season	Division	Apps	Goals	Apps	Goals	Apps	Goals	Apps	Goals	Apps	Goals
Manchester City U21	2017–18	—			—		—		3 (Note: Appearance(s) in EFL Trophy)	1	3	1
Manchester City U21	2018–19	—			—		—		0	0	0	0
Manchester City U21	Total				—		—		3	1	3	1
Jong Almere City (loan)	2018–19	Tweede Divisie	8	1	0	0	0	0	0	0	8	1
Almere City (loan)	2018–19	Eerste Divisie	1	0	2	0	0	0	0	0	3	0
Wolverhampton Wanderers U21	2019–20	—			—		—		2	0	2	0
Grasshopper (loan)	2019–20	Swiss Challenge League	0	0	0	0	0	0	0	0	0	0
Harrogate Town	2020–21	League Two	20	1	0	0	0	0	0	0	20	1
Notts County	2021–22	National League	31	1	1	0	—		1 (Note: One appearance in National League play-offs)	0	33	1
Notts County	2022–23	National League	10	1	1	0	—		0	0	11	1
Notts County	Total		41	2	2	0	0	0	1	0	44	2
Gateshead (loan)	2022–23	National League	14	0	0	0	—		0	0	14	0
Gateshead	2023–24	National League	40	3	1	0	—		1 (Note: Appearance(s) in FA Trophy)	0	42	3
Gateshead	Total		54	3	1	0	0	0	1	0	56	3
Exeter City	2024–25	League One	42	2	4	0	0	0	3	1	49	3
Exeter City	2025-26	League One	9	0	1	0	1	0	4	0	15	0
Exeter City	Total		51	2	5	0	1	0	7	1	64	3
Career total			175	9	10	0	1	0	14	2	200	11

== Honours ==
Harrogate Town

- FA Trophy: 2019–20

Gateshead

- FA Trophy: 2023–24

Rochdale

- National League play-offs: 2026
