= Finley Munroe =

English footballer (born 2005)

Personal information
- Full name: Finley Christopher Ryan Munroe
- Date of birth: 8 February 2005 (age 21)
- Place of birth: Kingston upon Thames, England
- Height: 1.81 m (5 ft 11 in)
- Position: Left-back

Team information
- Current team: Blackpool (on loan from Middlesbrough)
- Number: 26

Youth career
- –2021: Chelsea
- 2021–2024: Aston Villa

Senior career*
Years	Team	Apps	(Gls)
2024–2026	Aston Villa	1	(0)
2024–2025	→ Real Unión (loan)	27	(1)
2025–2026	→ Swindon Town (loan)	23	(2)
2026–	Middlesbrough	2	(0)
2026–	→ Blackpool (loan)	7	(1)
- * Club domestic league appearances and goals as of 17:39, 24 September 2026 (UTC)

Finley Christopher Ryan Munroe (born 8 February 2005) is an English professional footballer who plays as a left-back for EFL League One club Blackpool, on loan from EFL Championship club Middlesbrough.

He is a product of the Chelsea and Aston Villa academies. Munroe made his senior debut for Aston Villa in 2024 before joining Spanish club Real Unión on a season's loan, he also played for Swindon Town on loan before permanently joining Middlesbrough in January 2026.

== Club career ==
=== Aston Villa ===
Munroe started his career at the Chelsea Academy. During this time, former player Ashley Cole had identified Munroe as someone who should have a specialist scholarship. Despite this, Munroe was released by Chelsea on 30 June 2021, allegedly for being too small, and joined Aston Villa 9 days later. He was given his first professional contract on 7 July 2022.

Munroe made his first appearance in the Aston Villa first team squad on 26 January 2024, as an unused substitute in an FA Cup tie against former club Chelsea. On 12 April 2024, Munroe was given a contract extension by Aston Villa.

On 9 May 2024, Munroe made his first team debut as a late substitute in a 2–0 UEFA Europa Conference League semi-final defeat to Olympiacos. On 19 May 2024, Munroe made his Premier League debut as a substitute in an away defeat to Crystal Palace on the final day of the season.

On 24 August 2024, Munroe signed for Aston Villa's sister club Real Unión on a season-long loan.

On 15 July 2025, Munroe signed for EFL League Two club Swindon Town on a season-long loan. On 8 November 2025, Munroe scored his first English Football League goal, a long-range winner in a 2–1 victory over Tranmere Rovers.

=== Middlesbrough ===
On 15 January 2026, Aston Villa recalled Munroe from his loan at Swindon, and he was transferred permanently to EFL Championship club Middlesbrough for an undisclosed fee, reported to be around £300,000 with a sell-on clause.

Munroe made his Middlesbrough debut on 24 January 2026, as a late substitute in a 4–0 league victory over Preston North End.

==== Blackpool (loan) ====
On 10 August 2026, Munroe was loaned to EFL League One side Blackpool on a season long loan.

== Personal life ==
Munroe is a cousin of Arsenal player Declan Rice.

== Career statistics ==
=== Club ===
As of match played 6 October 2026

Appearances and goals by club, season and competition
Club	Season	League			FA Cup		League Cup		Europe		Other		Total	
Club	Season	Division	Apps	Goals	Apps	Goals	Apps	Goals	Apps	Goals	Apps	Goals	Apps	Goals
Aston Villa U21	2023–24	—			—		—		—		3 (Note: Appearances in EFL Trophy)	0	3	0
Aston Villa	2023–24	Premier League	1	0	0	0	0	0	1 (Note: Appearance in UEFA Europa Conference League)	0	—		2	0
Aston Villa	2024–25	Premier League	0	0	0	0	0	0	0	0	—		0	0
Aston Villa	2025–26	Premier League	0	0	0	0	0	0	0	0	—		0	0
Aston Villa	Total		1	0	0	0	0	0	1	0	0	0	2	0
Real Unión (loan)	2024–25	Primera Federación	27	1	0	0	—		—		—		27	1
Swindon Town (loan)	2025–26	League Two	23	2	0	0	1	0	—		3	0	27	2
Middlesbrough	2025–26	Championship	3	0	—		—		—		—		3	0
Middlesbrough	2026–27	Championship	0	0	0	0	0	0	—		—		0	0
Middlesbrough	Total		3	0	0	0	0	0	0	0	0	0	3	0
Blackpool (loan)	2026–27	League One	7	1	0	0	1	0	—		2	0	10	1
Career total			61	4	0	0	2	0	1	0	8	0	69	4
