= Caleb Watts =

Australian football player (born 2002)

- Watts in 2026

Personal information
- Full name: Caleb Cassius Watts
- Date of birth: 16 January 2002 (age 24)
- Place of birth: Hammersmith, England
- Height: 1.71 m (5 ft 7 in)
- Position: Attacking midfielder

Team information
- Current team: Plymouth Argyle
- Number: 17

Youth career
- –2018: Queens Park Rangers
- 2018–2021: Southampton

Senior career*
Years	Team	Apps	(Gls)
2021–2023	Southampton	3	(0)
2022	→ Crawley Town (loan)	1	(0)
2022–2023	→ Morecambe (loan)	23	(2)
2023–2025	Exeter City	40	(5)
2025–	Plymouth Argyle	41	(7)

International career^{‡}
2019	Australia U17	7	(1)
2021	Australia U23	8	(0)
- * Club domestic league appearances and goals as of 17:03, 24 October 2026 (UTC) ‡ National team caps and goals as of 28 July 2021

Caleb Cassius Watts (born 16 January 2002) is a professional soccer player who plays as an attacking midfielder for EFL League One club Plymouth Argyle. Born in England, he represents Australia at youth level.

== Club career ==
=== Southampton ===
Watts signed his first professional contract in July 2019. On 19 January 2021, Watts made his first professional appearance in Southampton's 2–0 victory against Shrewsbury Town in the FA Cup. Watts made his Premier League debut on 26 January 2021, replacing Danny Ings in Southampton's 3–1 defeat to Arsenal. Watts became the 52nd Australian to play in the league.

On 12 January 2022, Watts joined Crawley Town for the remainder of the 2021–22 season. He made his debut for the club as a 63rd-minute substitute against Carlisle United on 15 January 2022, but came back off 18 minutes later after he suffered a hamstring injury.

On 23 June 2022, Watts joined Morecambe on a season-long loan. He made his debut for the club on 6 August 2022 in a 3–0 defeat against Peterborough United. On 30 August 2022, Watts scored his first goal for the club in a 3–3 draw with Everton U21 in the EFL Trophy, and he converted a penalty to help Morecambe win 7–6 on penalties.

Watts was released by Southampton at the end of the 2022–23 season.

=== Exeter City ===
On 15 September 2023, Watts signed a short-term contract with League One side Exeter City until January 2024. A day later, he scored on his debut in a 1–0 victory against Cheltenham Town. In January 2024, he extended his contract until the end of the season with the option for a further year.

Watts extended his contract on 18 June 2024 until January 2025. On 1 October 2024, he received a red card during a 1–0 away victory against Leyton Orient for a late tackle in stoppage time. Watts extended his contract on 27 January 2025 until the end of the season.

Watts turned down the offer of a new contract at the end of the 2024–25 season.

=== Plymouth Argyle ===
On 23 May 2025, Watts agreed to join Plymouth Argyle on a three-year deal following their relegation to League One, officially joining on 1 July following the expiry of his Exeter City contract.

== International career ==
Watts was born in England to an Australian father, and is eligible to represent both England and Australia internationally. He was named in the Australia U17 squad for the 2019 FIFA U-17 World Cup.

Watts qualified for the Tokyo 2020 Olympics. He was part of the Olyroos Olympic squad. The team beat Argentina in their first group match but were unable to win another match and were therefore not in medal contention.

== Career statistics ==
As of match played 24 October 2026

Appearances and goals by club, season and competition
Club	Season	League			FA Cup		EFL Cup		Other		Total	
Club	Season	Division	Apps	Goals	Apps	Goals	Apps	Goals	Apps	Goals	Apps	Goals
Southampton	2020–21	Premier League	3	0	1	0	0	0	0	0	4	0
Southampton	2021–22	Premier League	0	0	0	0	0	0	0	0	0	0
Southampton	Total		3	0	1	0	0	0	0	0	4	0
Crawley Town (loan)	2021–22	League Two	1	0	0	0	0	0	0	0	1	0
Morecambe (loan)	2022–23	League One	23	2	1	0	3	0	3 (Note: Appearances in EFL Trophy)	1	30	3
Exeter City	2023–24	League One	9	1	0	0	1	0	1	0	11	1
Exeter City	2024–25	League One	31	4	2	0	1	0	3	0	37	4
Exeter City	Total		40	5	2	0	2	0	4	0	48	5
Plymouth Argyle	2025–26	League One	29	5	0	0	2	0	2	1	33	6
Plymouth Argyle	2026–27	League One	12	2	0	0	1	0	2	2	15	4
Plymouth Argyle	Total		41	7	0	0	3	0	4	3	48	10
Career total			108	13	4	0	8	0	11	3	131	16
