= Oliver Irow =

English footballer (born 2006)

- Irow in 2026

Personal information
- Full name: Oliver Irow
- Date of birth: 10 May 2006 (age 20)
- Place of birth: London, England
- Height: 1.88 m (6 ft 2 in)
- Position: Winger

Team information
- Current team: Plymouth Argyle (on loan from Tottenham Hotspur)
- Number: 14

Youth career
- –2024: Tottenham Hotspur

Senior career*
| Years | Team | Apps | (Gls) |
| 2024– | Tottenham Hotspur | 0 | (0) |
| 2026 | → Mansfield Town (loan) | 18 | (4) |
| 2026– | → Plymouth Argyle (loan) | 10 | (3) |

International career
| 2022 | England U16 | 3 | (2) |
| 2022 | England U17 | 5 | (0) |
- * Club domestic league appearances and goals as of 20 October 2026

Oliver Irow (born 10 May 2006) is an English professional footballer who plays as a winger or forward for EFL League One club Plymouth Argyle, on loan from Premier League club Tottenham Hotspur. He has represented England at under-17 level.

== Club career ==
=== Tottenham Hotspur ===
Born in London, Irow joined the academy of Tottenham Hotspur as an under-8 player and progressed through the club's youth ranks. He was educated at Chigwell School, where he was named Sportsman of the Year. During the 2021–22 season he scored 16 goals for Tottenham's under-16 side and made his under-18 debut while still only 15 years old.

Irow subsequently became a regular member of Tottenham's under-21 squad. During the 2025–26 season he scored five goals in 12 appearances for the under-21s and also featured in the UEFA Youth League, scoring twice.

On 2 February 2026, Tottenham announced that Irow had signed a new contract with the club.

=== Loan to Mansfield Town ===
In January 2026, Irow joined Mansfield Town on loan. He scored twice on his senior competitive debut and went on to score four goals in 18 appearances during his spell with the club.

=== Loan to Plymouth Argyle ===
On 24 August 2026, Irow joined Plymouth Argyle on a season-long loan. Plymouth head coach Tom Cleverley described him as a direct and versatile attacker capable of playing across the forward line. He was assigned the number 14 shirt. Irow scored a debut goal on 25 August 2026, in a 4–2 League Cup defeat to Coventry City.

== International career ==
Irow has represented England at under-16 and under-17 levels. He earned five caps for the England under-17 team.

== Playing style ==
Primarily a right winger, Irow is also capable of playing as a centre-forward or attacking midfielder. He is known for his direct running, versatility and eye for goal.

== Career statistics ==
As of match played 20 October 2026

Appearances and goals by club, season and competition
| Club | Season | League | | | Cup | | League Cup | | Europe | | Other | | Total | |
| Club | Season | Division | Apps | Goals | Apps | Goals | Apps | Goals | Apps | Goals | Apps | Goals | Apps | Goals |
|---|---|---|---|---|---|---|---|---|---|---|---|---|---|---|
| Tottenham Hotspur | 2024–25 | Premier League | 0 | 0 | 0 | 0 | 0 | 0 | 0 | 0 | — | | 0 | 0 |
| Mansfield Town (loan) | 2025–26 | League One | 18 | 4 | 0 | 0 | 0 | 0 | — | | 0 | 0 | 18 | 4 |
| Plymouth Argyle (loan) | 2026–27 | League One | 10 | 3 | 0 | 0 | 1 | 1 | — | | 1 (Note: Appearance in EFL Trophy) | 0 | 12 | 4 |
| Career total | | | 28 | 7 | 0 | 0 | 1 | 1 | 0 | 0 | 1 | 0 | 30 | 8 |
