= Karoy Anderson =

Jamaican-English footballer (born 2004)

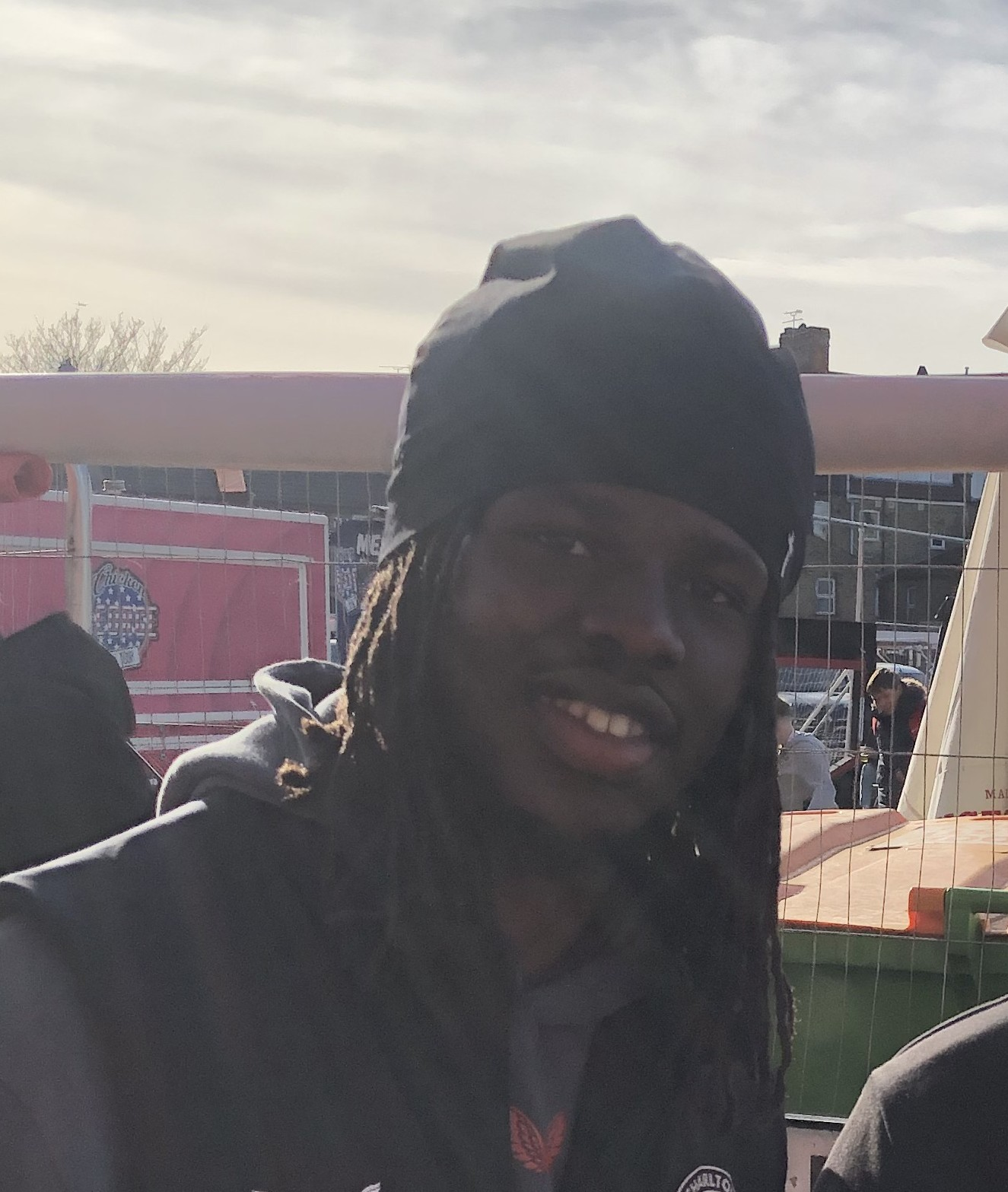
- Anderson in 2025

Personal information
- Full name: Karoy Zidane Lovebourne Anderson
- Date of birth: 1 October 2004 (age 22)
- Place of birth: Lewisham, England
- Height: 1.80 m (5 ft 11 in)
- Position: Attacking midfielder

Team information
- Current team: Blackpool
- Number: 17

Youth career
- 2013–2022: Charlton Athletic

Senior career*
Years	Team	Apps	(Gls)
2022–2026	Charlton Athletic	73	(4)
2023	→ Aldershot Town (loan)	5	(0)
2026	→ Blackpool (loan)	16	(1)
2026–	Blackpool	12	(2)

International career^{‡}
2023–	Jamaica	24	(0)
Medal record
Men's football
Representing Jamaica
CONCACAF Nations League
Bronze medal – third place	2024
- * Club domestic league appearances and goals as of 17:10, 14 November 2026 (UTC) ‡ National team caps and goals as of 17:10, 14 November 2026 (UTC)

Karoy Zidane Lovebourne Anderson (born 1 October 2004) is a professional footballer who plays as an attacking midfielder for EFL League One club Blackpool. Born in England, he represents the Jamaica national team.

== Club career ==
=== Charlton Athletic ===
Coming through the youth system of Charlton Athletic, Anderson signed his first professional contract with the club on 5 October 2021, committing himself until 2024.

He made his professional debut for the club as an 18-year-old, coming off the bench in the 75th minute of a 3–2 EFL Trophy second-round defeat at Plymouth Argyle on 22 November 2022 in which he scored his side's second goal of the game in the 91st minute.

On 17 September 2025, Anderson signed a new contract with Charlton Athletic until the summer of 2028.

==== Aldershot Town (loan) ====
On 17 January 2023, Anderson joined Aldershot Town on a 28-day loan. On the same day, Anderson made his league debut, coming on in the second half of a 2–1 victory at Solihull Moors.

On 21 February 2023, it was confirmed that Anderson's loan had been extended for a further month.

==== Blackpool (loan) ====
On 2 February 2026, Anderson joined Blackpool on loan for the remainder of the season. He scored on his debut at Huddersfield Town five days later.

=== Blackpool ===
On 21 July 2026, Anderson re-joined Blackpool, signing a four-year contract.

== International career ==
Born in England, Anderson is of Jamaican descent. He was called up to the Jamaica national team for a set of 2023–24 CONCACAF Nations League matches in October 2023.

On 12 October 2023, Anderson made his Jamaica debut, coming on as a second-half substitute in a 4–1 victory over Grenada.

On 9 June 2024, Anderson made his Jamaica full debut, starting XI in a 3–2 victory over Dominica.

== Career statistics ==
=== Club ===
As of match played 7 November 2026

Appearances and goals by club, season and competition
Club	Season	League			FA Cup		EFL Cup		Other		Total	
Club	Season	Division	Apps	Goals	Apps	Goals	Apps	Goals	Apps	Goals	Apps	Goals
Charlton Athletic	2022–23	League One	0	0	0	0	0	0	1 (Note: One appearance in the EFL Trophy)	1	1	1
Charlton Athletic	2023–24	League One	25	2	1	0	1	0	1 (Note: One appearance in the EFL Trophy)	0	28	2
Charlton Athletic	2024–25	League One	38	2	3	0	1	0	4 (Note: One appearance in the EFL Trophy and three appearances in the League One play-offs)	0	46	2
Charlton Athletic	2025–26	Championship	10	0	1	0	2	0	—		13	0
Charlton Athletic	Charlton Athletic total		73	4	5	0	4	0	6	1	88	5
Aldershot Town (loan)	2022–23	National League	5	0	—		—		2 (Note: Two appearances in the FA Trophy)	0	7	0
Blackpool (loan)	2025–26	League One	16	1	—		—		—		16	1
Blackpool	2026–27	League One	12	2	1	0	1	0	0	0	14	2
Blackpool	Blackpool total		28	3	1	0	1	0	0	0	30	3
Career total			106	7	6	0	5	0	8	1	125	8

=== International ===
As of match played 14 November 2026

International statistics
National team	Year	Apps	Goals
Jamaica	2023	2	0
Jamaica	2024	10	0
Jamaica	2025	6	0
Jamaica	2026	6	0
Total		24	0

== Honours ==
Charlton Athletic

- EFL League One play-offs: 2025

Jamaica

- CONCACAF Nations League third place: 2023–24
