= 2026–27 Exeter City F.C. season =

125th season in existence of Exeter City FC

Exeter City
2026–27 season
- Owner: Exeter City Supporters' Trust
- Chairman: Wilf Walsh
- Manager: Matt Taylor
- Stadium: St James Park
- League Two: 8th (after 16 matches)
- FA Cup: Advanced to second round
- EFL Cup: First round
- EFL Trophy: Advanced to second round
- Top goalscorer: League: Sonny Cox; Reece Cole; Jack Fitzwater; Anthony Scully (2 goals); All: Charlie Cummins (3 goals)
- Highest home attendance: 6,197 vs. Cheltenham Town (14 Nov.)
- Lowest home attendance: 1,469 vs. Oxford United (6 Oct.)
- Average home league attendance: 5,742
- Biggest win: 2–0 vs. Accrington Stanley (22 Aug.); 2–0 vs. Tottenham Hotspur U21 (8 Sep.); 2–0 vs. Crewe Alexandra (20 Oct.)
- Biggest defeat: 2–0 vs. Plymouth Argyle (10 Aug.)

The 2026–27 season is the 125th season in the history of Exeter City Football Club and their first season back in League Two since the 2021–22 season following relegation from League One in the preceding season. In addition to the domestic league, the club is also participating in the FA Cup and the EFL Trophy. Exeter City were eliminated in the first round of the EFL Cup

== Managerial changes ==
Prior to the season starting, Matt Taylor was appointed as permanent manager following an interim period at the end of the preceding season.

== Transfers and contracts ==
=== In ===
| Date | Pos. | Player | From | Fee | Ref. |
|---|---|---|---|---|---|
| 1 July 2026 (Note: The transfer was announced on 9 June, and would become official on July 1 once Edwards' contract at Morecambe expired.) | RW | (Wales) Gwion Edwards | (England) Morecambe | Free | |
| 1 July 2026 (Note: The transfer was announced on 30 June, and would become official on July 1 once Gordon's contract at Walsall expired.) | CF | (England) Josh Gordon | (England) Walsall | Free | |
| 17 July 2026 | CM | (England) Taylor Perry | (England) Shrewsbury Town | Free | |
| 6 August 2026 | CM | (England) Harry Kite | (England) Truro City | Free | |
| 1 September 2026 | CF | (England) Danny Rose | (England) Barrow | Undisclosed | |
| 3 October 2026 | LW | (Republic of Ireland) Anthony Scully | (England) Shrewsbury Town | Free | |

=== Loaned in ===
| Date | Pos. | Player | From | Date until | Ref. |
|---|---|---|---|---|---|
| 10 August 2026 | WB | (Scotland) Ethan Sutherland | (England) Wolverhampton Wanderers | End of season | |
| 14 August 2026 | WB | (Kenya) Vincent Harper | (England) Walsall | End of season | |
| 14 August 2026 | WB | (England) Lakyle Samuel | (England) Manchester City | End of season | |
| 1 September 2026 | CB | (England) Jack Taylor | (England) Stevenage | End of season | |
| 1 September 2026 | CF | (England) Ajay Matthews | (England) Millwall | End of season | |
| 2 September 2026 | CM | (Wales) Dan Watts | (Wales) Swansea City | End of season | |

=== Loaned out ===
| Date | Pos. | Player | To | Loaned until | Ref. |
|---|---|---|---|---|---|
| 7 August 2026 | RM | (England) Tom Dean | (England) Truro City | 2 January 2027 | |
| 22 August 2026 | RB | (England) Liam Cartwright | (England) Yate Town | 19 September 2026 | |
| 28 August 2026 | CM | (Portugal) Pedro Elawar | (England) Bath City | 21 November 2026 | |
| 2 October 2026 | LB | (England) Jamie Rickhuss | (England) Bovey Tracey | 2 November 2026 | |
| 24 October 2026 | CB | (England) Tobias Alsop | (England) Tiverton Town | 24 November 2026 | |

=== Out ===
| Date | Pos. | Player | To | Fee | Ref. |
|---|---|---|---|---|---|
| 31 July 2026 | CB | (England) Johnly Yfeko | (Scotland) Kilmarnock | Undisclosed | |
| 31 August 2026 | CF | (England) Jayden Wareham | (England) Wycombe Wanderers | Undisclosed | |
| 2 September 2026 | CF | (Scotland) Kieran Wilson | (England) Hull City | Undisclosed | |

=== Released / Out of contract ===
| Date | Pos. | Player | Subsequent club | Joined Date | Ref. |
|---|---|---|---|---|---|
| 30 June 2026 | CAM | (Scotland) Jack Aitchison | (England) Bristol Rovers | 1 July 2026 | |
| 30 June 2026 | LB | (England) Danny Andrew | (England) Fleetwood Town | 1 July 2026 | |
| 30 June 2026 | CF | (Northern Ireland) Josh Magennis | (England) Stevenage | 1 July 2026 | |
| 30 June 2026 | RB | (Scotland) Jack McMillan | (Scotland) Falkirk | 1 July 2026 | |
| 30 June 2026 | LM | (Finland) Ilmari Niskanen | (England) Blackpool | 1 July 2026 | |
| 30 June 2026 | CB | (Republic of Ireland) Pierce Sweeney | (England) Cheltenham Town | 1 July 2026 | |
| 30 June 2026 | CAM | (England) Aidan Bown | (England) Willand Rovers | 26 July 2026 | |
| 30 June 2026 | RB | (England) Jude Horn | (England) Willand Rovers | 27 July 2026 | |
| 30 June 2026 | CB | (England) Jack Anthony | (England) Taunton Town | 4 August 2026 | |
| 30 June 2026 | CB | (England) Jacca Cavendish | | | |
| 30 June 2026 | CM | (England) Harry Crees | | | |
| 30 June 2026 | RW | (England) Callum Graham | | | |
| 30 June 2026 | CM | (England) Luke Hodgetts | | | |
| 30 June 2026 | CDM | (Scotland) Kevin McDonald | | | |

=== New contract ===
| Date | Pos. | Player | Contract until | Ref. |
|---|---|---|---|---|
| 7 May 2026 | CAM | (England) Reece Cole | 30 June 2027 | |
| 7 May 2026 | CF | (England) Sonny Cox | 30 June 2027 | |
| 7 May 2026 | CF | (Scotland) Kieran Wilson | 30 June 2027 | |
| 19 October 2026 | CB | (England) Jack Fitzwater | 30 June 2029 | |
| 23 October 2026 | CAM | (England) George Birch | 30 June 2028 (Note: Club option for a further year) | |
| 6 November 2026 | CB | (Wales) Ed James | 30 June 2028 | |

== Pre-season and friendlies ==
On 20 May, Exeter announced their a pre-season friendly against local rivals Torquay United. Five days later, a second fixture was confirmed against Weston-super-Mare. On 2 June, a third opponent was added to the pre-season schedule, versus Truro City. A day later, a home friendly against Bristol City was confirmed.

Win Draw Loss Fixtures

| 18 July 2026 Friendly | Truro City | 1–0 | Exeter City | Threemilestone |
| 15:00 BST | Harvey 52' (pen.) | Report | | Stadium: Truro City Stadium; Attendance: 1,259; Referee: Steven Swan |

| 25 July 2026 Friendly | Weston-super-Mare | 0–2 | Exeter City | Weston-super-Mare |
| 15:00 BST | | Report | Cox 29'; Gordon 81' | Stadium: Optima Stadium |

| 31 July 2026 Friendly | Torquay United | 2–1 | Exeter City | Torquay |
| 19:30 BST | Moore 15'; Westendorf 26' | Report | Wilson 45' | Stadium: Plainmoor; Attendance: 3,358 (853 away) |

| 1 August 2026 Friendly | Exeter City | 1–1 | Bristol City | Exeter |
| 17:30 BST | Cole 44' | Report | Horvat 83' | Stadium: St James Park; Attendance: 4,294 |

== Competitions ==
=== Overall record ===
| Competition | First match | Last match | Starting round | Final position | Record | | | | | | | |
| Competition | First match | Last match | Starting round | Final position | Pld | W | D | L | GF | GA | GD | Win % |
|---|---|---|---|---|---|---|---|---|---|---|---|---|
| League Two | 15 August 2026 | May 2027 | Matchday 1 | TBD | 16 | 6 | 5 | 5 | 13 | 10 | +3 | 37.50 |
| FA Cup | 7 November 2026 | TBD | First round | TBD | 1 | 1 | 0 | 0 | 2 | 1 | +1 | 100.00 |
| EFL Cup | 10 August 2026 | 10 August 2026 | First round | First round | 1 | 0 | 0 | 1 | 0 | 2 | −2 | 0.00 |
| EFL Trophy | 8 September 2026 | TBD | Group stage | TBD | 3 | 1 | 2 | 0 | 6 | 4 | +2 | 33.33 |
| Total | | | | | 21 | 8 | 7 | 6 | 21 | 17 | +4 | 38.10 |

Last updated: 21 November 2026

=== League Two ===
==== League table ====
| Pos | Team | Pld | W | D | L | GF | GA | GD | Pts | Promotion, qualification or relegation |
|---|---|---|---|---|---|---|---|---|---|---|
| 6 | Crewe Alexandra | 16 | 5 | 9 | 2 | 22 | 22 | 0 | 24 | Qualification for League Two play-offs |
| 7 | Walsall | 14 | 5 | 8 | 1 | 21 | 12 | +9 | 23 | Qualification for League Two play-offs |
| 8 | Exeter City | 16 | 6 | 5 | 5 | 13 | 10 | +3 | 23 | |
| 9 | Newport County | 16 | 5 | 7 | 4 | 24 | 19 | +5 | 22 | |
| 10 | Tranmere Rovers | 16 | 5 | 7 | 4 | 21 | 19 | +2 | 22 | |

Updated to match(es) played on 21 November 2026. Source: EFL Official Website
Rules for classification: 1) Points; 2) Goal difference; 3) Number of goals scored; 4) Head-to-head results; 5) Wins; 6) Away goals; 7) Penalty points (sec 9.5); 8) 12-point sending off offences

==== Results summary ====
| Overall | | | | | | | | Home | | | | | | Away | | | | | |
| Pld | W | D | L | GF | GA | GD | Pts | W | D | L | GF | GA | GD | W | D | L | GF | GA | GD |
|---|---|---|---|---|---|---|---|---|---|---|---|---|---|---|---|---|---|---|---|
| 16 | 6 | 5 | 5 | 13 | 10 | +3 | 23 | 5 | 3 | 0 | 9 | 2 | +7 | 1 | 2 | 5 | 4 | 8 | −4 |

Last updated: 14 November 2026.
Source: Soccerway

==== Results by round ====
| Round | 1 | 2 | 3 | 4 | 5 | 6 | 7 | 8 | 9 | 10 | 11 | 12 | 13 | 14 | 15 | 16 | 17 | 18 | 19 | 20 | 21 | 22 | 23 | 24 | 25 | 26 | 27 | 28 | 29 | 30 | 31 | 32 |
|---|---|---|---|---|---|---|---|---|---|---|---|---|---|---|---|---|---|---|---|---|---|---|---|---|---|---|---|---|---|---|---|---|
| Ground | A | H | A | H | H | A | H | A | H | A | A | H | H | A | H | A | H | A | H | A | H | A | A | H | H | A | A | H | H | A | A | H |
| Result | L | W | L | D | D | L | D | L | W | W | D | W | W | L | W | D | | | | | | | | | | | | | | | | |
| Position | 19 | 13 | 15 | 15 | 16 | 20 | 20 | 21 | 20 | 14 | 16 | 10 | 8 | 12 | 8 | 8 | | | | | | | | | | | | | | | | |
| Points | 0 | 3 | 3 | 4 | 5 | 5 | 6 | 6 | 9 | 12 | 13 | 16 | 19 | 19 | 22 | 23 | | | | | | | | | | | | | | | | |

Source: Soccerway
A = Away; H = Home; W = Win; D = Draw; L = Loss; P = Postponed
Notes: updated 21 November 2026

==== Matches ====
On 25 June, the League Two fixtures were revealed.

Win Draw Loss Fixtures

| 15 August 2026 1 | Grimsby Town | 1–0 | Exeter City | Cleethorpes |
| 15:00 BST | Rodgers 35' | Report | Doyle-Hayes (yellow card) 23' | Stadium: Blundell Park; Attendance: 7,483; Referee: Abigail Byrne |

| 22 August 2026 2 | Exeter City | 2–0 | Accrington Stanley | Exeter |
| 15:00 BST | Fitzwater 2', (yellow card) 68'; Conneely 13' (o.g.); Wareham (yellow card) 48'; Harper (yellow card) 55' | Report | Woods (yellow card) 45+1'; Moore (yellow card) 85' | Stadium: St James Park; Attendance: 5,939 (inc. 104 away supporters); Referee: Scott Jackson |

| 29 August 2026 3 | York City | 2–1 | Exeter City | Huntington |
| 15:00 BST | Newby 7'; Williams (yellow card) 41'; Fallowfield (yellow card) 52'; Malcolm 76' | Report | Cole (yellow card) 33'; Edwards (yellow card) 35'; Cummins (yellow card) 62'; Fitzwater 90+1' | Stadium: York Community Stadium; Attendance: 7,978; Referee: Oliver Langford |

| 1 September 2026 4 | Exeter City | 1–1 | Barnet | Exeter |
| 19:45 BST | Gordon (yellow card) 45+2'; Cole 67' | Report | Comley (yellow card) 22'; Lakin (yellow card) 41'; Kanu 60'; Noel-Williams (yellow card) 82'; Knowles (yellow card) 86' | Stadium: St James Park; Attendance: 4,826; Referee: Sunny Sukhvir Gill |

| 5 September 2026 5 | Exeter City | 0–0 | Walsall | Exeter |
| 15:00 BST | | Report | Ahui (yellow card) 77' | Stadium: St James Park; Attendance: 6,002; Referee: Harrison Blair |

| 12 September 2026 6 | Port Vale | 1–0 | Exeter City | Burslem |
| 15:00 BST | Byers 70' (pen.), (yellow card) 77'; Lawrence-Gabriel (yellow card) 73'; Garrity (yellow card) 90+5' | Report | Doyle-Hayes (yellow card) 57'; Perry (yellow card) 90+5' | Stadium: Vale Park; Referee: Leigh Doughty |

| 19 September 2026 7 | Exeter City | 0–0 | Tranmere Rovers | Exeter |
| 15:00 BST | Gordon (yellow card) 45'; James (yellow card) 52' | Report | Smith (yellow card) 30'; Jones (yellow card) 65'; Slater (yellow card) 75' | Stadium: St James Park; Attendance: 6,158; Referee: Isaac Searle |

| 26 September 2026 8 | Bristol Rovers | 1–0 | Exeter City | Bristol |
| 15:00 BST | Harrison (yellow card) 60'; Cavegn 66' | Report | Edwards (yellow card) 39' | Stadium: Memorial Stadium; Attendance: 11,106; Referee: Martin Coy |

| 3 October 2026 9 | Exeter City | 1–0 | Rotherham United | Exeter |
| 15:00 BST | Woodhouse (yellow card) 43'; Scully 51'; Cummins (yellow card) 90+2' | Report | Iorfa (yellow card) 58' | Stadium: St James Park; Attendance: 5,631; Referee: Lewis Sandoe |

| 10 October 2026 10 | Shrewsbury Town | 0–1 | Exeter City | Shrewsbury |
| 15:00 BST | Sang (yellow card) 11'; Hoole (yellow card) 65'; Gray (yellow card) 76'; Turner-Cooke (yellow card) 90' | Report | Doyle-Hayes (yellow card) 43'; Perry (yellow card) 77'; Cox 86' | Stadium: New Meadow; Referee: Declan Brown |

| 17 October 2026 11 | Colchester United | 0–0 | Exeter City | Colchester |
| 15:00 BST | Williams (yellow card) 17'; Lubala (yellow card) 79' | Report | Fitzwater (yellow card) 39'; Cummins (yellow card) 66' | Stadium: Colchester Community Stadium; Attendance: 4,984; Referee: Ben Atkinson |

| 20 October 2026 12 | Exeter City | 2–0 | Crewe Alexandra | Exeter |
| 19:45 BST | Scully 21' (pen.); Fitzwater (yellow card) 81'; Cole 90+4' | Report | McNeill (yellow card) 57' | Stadium: St James Park; Attendance: 5,671; Referee: Harry Wager |

| 24 October 2026 13 | Exeter City | 2–1 | Fleetwood Town | Exeter |
| 15:00 BST | Perry (yellow card) 35'; Cummins 58'; Fitzwater (yellow card) 60'; Woodhouse 64' | Report | Coughlan 61' | Stadium: St James Park; Attendance: 5,515; Referee: George Laflin |

| 31 October 2026 14 | Salford City | 2–1 | Exeter City | Salford |
| 15:00 GMT | Norris (yellow card) 24'; Bonds (yellow card) 44'; Wiredu (yellow card) 45+3'; Garbutt 66'; Aimson 88' | Report | Cox 34'; Woodhouse (yellow card) 49' | Stadium: Moor Lane; Referee: Oliver Langford |

| 14 November 2026 15 | Exeter City | 1–0 | Cheltenham Town | Exeter |
| 12:30 GMT | Samuel 51' | Report | Wilson (yellow card) 40'; Otchere (yellow card) 45' | Stadium: St James Park; Attendance: 6,197; Referee: Andrew Humphries |
Note: Fixture was initially scheduled for a 15:00 kick-off, but was brought forward for live Sky Sports broadcasting.

| 21 November 2026 16 | Oldham Athletic | 1–1 | Exeter City | Oldham |
| 15:00 GMT | Fawunmi (yellow card) 18'; Appiah-Forson 38'; Scott-Morriss (yellow card) 62'; Pett (yellow card) 75'; Hawkes (yellow card) 90+4' | Report | Taylor (yellow card) 64'; Daniels 72' (o.g.); Woodhouse (yellow card) 90+3' | Stadium: Boundary Park; Attendance: 6,756; Referee: Kirsty Dowle |

| 28 November 2026 17 | Exeter City | v | Crawley Town | Exeter |
| 12:30 GMT | | | | Stadium: St James Park |
Note: Fixture was initially scheduled for a 15:00 kick-off, but was brought forward for live Sky Sports broadcasting.

| 1 December 2026 18 | Chesterfield | v | Exeter City | Chesterfield |
| 19:45 GMT | | | | Stadium: SMH Group Stadium |

| 12 December 2026 19 | Exeter City | v | Rochdale | Exeter |
| 15:00 GMT | | | | Stadium: St James Park |

| 19 December 2026 20 | Northampton Town | v | Exeter City | Northampton |
| 12:30 GMT | | | | Stadium: Sixfields Stadium |
Note: Fixture was initially scheduled for a 15:00 kick-off, but was brought forward for live Sky Sports broadcasting.

| 26 December 2026 21 | Exeter City | v | Newport County | Exeter |
| 15:00 GMT | | | | Stadium: St James Park |

| 29 December 2026 22 | Swindon Town | v | Exeter City | Swindon |
| 19:45 GMT | | | | Stadium: County Ground |

| 2 January 2027 23 | Gillingham | v | Exeter City | Gillingham |
| 15:00 GMT | | | | Stadium: Priestfield Stadium |
Note: Fixture was initially scheduled for 1 January, but was pushed back 24 hours after an agreement between both sides and the English Football League.

| 9 January 2027 24 | Exeter City | v | Northampton Town | Exeter |
| 15:00 GMT | | | | Stadium: St James Park |

| 16 January 2027 25 | Exeter City | v | Colchester United | Exeter |
| 15:00 GMT | | | | Stadium: St James Park |

| 19 January 2027 26 | Crewe Alexandra | v | Exeter City | Crewe |
| 19:45 GMT | | | | Stadium: Gresty Road |

| 23 January 2027 27 | Fleetwood Town | v | Exeter City | Fleetwood |
| 15:00 GMT | | | | Stadium: Highbury Stadium |

| 30 January 2027 28 | Exeter City | v | Salford City | Exeter |
| 15:00 GMT | | | | Stadium: St James Park |

| 6 February 2027 29 | Exeter City | v | York City | Exeter |
| 15:00 GMT | | | | Stadium: St James Park |

| 9 February 2027 30 | Barnet | v | Exeter City | Edgware |
| 19:45 GMT | | | | Stadium: The Hive Stadium |

| 13 February 2027 31 | Walsall | v | Exeter City | Bescot |
| 15:00 GMT | | | | Stadium: Bescot Stadium |

| 20 February 2027 32 | Exeter City | v | Port Vale | Exeter |
| 12:30 GMT | | | | Stadium: St James Park |
Note: Fixture was initially scheduled for a 15:00 kick-off, but was brought forward for live Sky Sports broadcasting.

=== FA Cup ===
Exeter were drawn away to League One sides Huddersfield Town in the first round and at home against Stevenage in the second round.

Win Draw Loss Fixtures

| 7 November 2026 First round | Huddersfield Town | 1–2 | Exeter City | Huddersfield |
| 15:00 GMT | Bowat 54' | Report | Taylor 12'; Cummins 81' | Stadium: Kirklees Stadium; Referee: Matthew Russell |

| 5 December 2026 Second round | Exeter City | v | Stevenage | Exeter |
| 15:00 GMT | | | | Stadium: St James Park |

=== EFL Cup ===
Exeter were drawn away to Plymouth Argyle in the first round.

Win Draw Loss Fixtures

| 10 August 2026 First round | Plymouth Argyle | 2–0 | Exeter City | Plymouth |
| 20:00 BST | Hartridge 90+2'; Pepple 90+4' | Report | | Stadium: Home Park; Referee: Dean Whitestone |

=== EFL Trophy ===
==== Group stage ====
Exeter were drawn against Oxford United, Cheltenham Town and Tottenham Hotspur U21 into Southern Group A.

| Pos | Div | Team | Pld | W | PW | PL | L | GF | GA | GD | Pts | Qualification |
|---|---|---|---|---|---|---|---|---|---|---|---|---|
| 1 | L2 | Exeter City (A) | 3 | 1 | 1 | 1 | 0 | 6 | 4 | +2 | 6 | Advance to Round 2 |
| 2 | L1 | Oxford United | 2 | 1 | 0 | 1 | 0 | 6 | 2 | +4 | 4 | Advance to Round 2 |
| 3 | L2 | Cheltenham Town (E) | 3 | 0 | 2 | 0 | 1 | 4 | 8 | −4 | 4 | |
| 4 | ACA | Tottenham Hotspur U21 | 2 | 0 | 0 | 1 | 1 | 2 | 4 | −2 | 1 | |

Updated to match(es) played on 10 November 2026. Source: EFL
(A) Advances to a further round; (E) Eliminated

Win Draw Loss Fixtures

| 8 September 2026 Group stage | Exeter City | 2–0 | Tottenham Hotspur U21 | Exeter |
| 19:00 BST | Rose 35', (yellow card) 37'; Cayless (yellow card) 52', (goal) 86'; Oakes (yellow card) 73' | Report | Feeney (yellow card) 44'; Adedeji (yellow card) 85' | Stadium: St James Park; Attendance: 1,647 (163 away); Referee: Alan Young |

| 22 September 2026 Group stage | Cheltenham Town | 2–2 (4–3 p) | Exeter City | Cheltenham |
| 19:00 BST | Bickerstaff 45+1'; Miller 89' (pen.) | Report | James (yellow card) 13'; Gordon 77'; Cummins 86'; Sutherland (red card) 90+7' | Stadium: Whaddon Road; Attendance: 1,242; Referee: Emily Heaslip |
| | Penalties |
| | Nurse (penalty scored); Otchere (penalty missed); Bickerstaff (penalty scored); Broom (penalty scored); Miller (penalty scored) | | (penalty missed) Gordon; (penalty scored) Samuel; (penalty scored) Woodhouse; (penalty scored) Cummins; (penalty missed) Perry |

| 6 October 2026 Group stage | Exeter City | 2–2 (4–3 p) | Oxford United | Exeter |
| 19:00 BST | Perry 7'; Oakes (yellow card) 13'; Gordon 31'; Kite (yellow card) 51'; Alsop (yellow card) 90+2' | Report | Golding (yellow card) 28'; Bradney 30'; Fitzwater 78' (o.g.); Sibley (yellow card) 90+2' | Stadium: St James Park; Attendance: 1,469; Referee: James Durkin |
| | Penalties |
| | Scully (penalty scored); Cummins (penalty scored); Woodhouse (penalty scored); Fitzwater (penalty missed); Cayless (penalty scored) | | (penalty scored) O'Donkor; (penalty scored) Sibley; (penalty missed) Bradney; (penalty scored) Snowden; (penalty missed) Golding |

== Statistics ==
=== Appearances and goals ===
As of match played 21 November 2026

Players with no appearances are not included on the list; italics indicate loaned in player

| No. | Pos | Nat | Player | Total | | League One | | FA Cup | | EFL Cup | | EFL Trophy | |
| No. | Pos | Nat | Player | Apps | Goals | Apps | Goals | Apps | Goals | Apps | Goals | Apps | Goals |
|---|---|---|---|---|---|---|---|---|---|---|---|---|---|
| 1 | GK | (England) ENG | Jack Bycroft | 18 | 0 | 16+0 | 0 | 1+0 | 0 | 1+0 | 0 | 0+0 | 0 |
| 2 | DF | (England) ENG | Lakyle Samuel | 18 | 1 | 11+3 | 1 | 1+0 | 0 | 0+0 | 0 | 1+2 | 0 |
| 3 | DF | (England) ENG | Luca Woodhouse | 19 | 1 | 14+0 | 1 | 1+0 | 0 | 1+0 | 0 | 2+1 | 0 |
| 5 | DF | (England) ENG | Jack Fitzwater | 18 | 2 | 16+0 | 2 | 0+0 | 0 | 1+0 | 0 | 1+0 | 0 |
| 6 | DF | (England) ENG | Jack Taylor | 16 | 1 | 9+2 | 0 | 1+0 | 1 | 1+0 | 0 | 2+1 | 0 |
| 7 | MF | (Wales) WAL | Gwion Edwards | 11 | 0 | 6+3 | 0 | 0+0 | 0 | 1+0 | 0 | 1+0 | 0 |
| 8 | MF | (England) ENG | Taylor Perry | 20 | 1 | 8+7 | 0 | 0+1 | 0 | 1+0 | 0 | 3+0 | 1 |
| 10 | FW | (England) ENG | Josh Gordon | 21 | 2 | 10+6 | 0 | 0+1 | 0 | 0+1 | 0 | 1+2 | 2 |
| 11 | FW | (England) ENG | Andrew Oluwabori | 6 | 0 | 2+3 | 0 | 0+0 | 0 | 1+0 | 0 | 0+0 | 0 |
| 12 | MF | (England) ENG | Reece Cole | 16 | 2 | 10+4 | 2 | 1+0 | 0 | 1+0 | 0 | 0+0 | 0 |
| 14 | MF | (England) ENG | Harry Kite | 9 | 0 | 3+2 | 0 | 1+0 | 0 | 0+1 | 0 | 2+0 | 0 |
| 15 | FW | (England) ENG | Ajay Matthews | 3 | 0 | 0+1 | 0 | 0+0 | 0 | 0+0 | 0 | 2+0 | 0 |
| 16 | MF | (Republic of Ireland) IRL | Charlie Cummins | 19 | 3 | 15+0 | 1 | 1+0 | 1 | 1+0 | 0 | 1+1 | 1 |
| 18 | DF | (England) ENG | Liam Oakes | 8 | 0 | 0+5 | 0 | 0+0 | 0 | 0+0 | 0 | 3+0 | 0 |
| 19 | FW | (England) ENG | Sonny Cox | 14 | 2 | 6+6 | 2 | 1+0 | 0 | 0+0 | 0 | 0+1 | 0 |
| 20 | MF | (England) ENG | George Birch | 19 | 0 | 8+6 | 0 | 1+0 | 0 | 0+1 | 0 | 3+0 | 0 |
| 21 | MF | (Wales) WAL | Dan Watts | 1 | 0 | 0+0 | 0 | 0+0 | 0 | 0+0 | 0 | 0+1 | 0 |
| 22 | GK | (England) ENG | Frankie Phillips | 3 | 0 | 0+0 | 0 | 0+0 | 0 | 0+0 | 0 | 3+0 | 0 |
| 23 | MF | (Scotland) SCO | Ethan Sutherland | 17 | 0 | 2+11 | 0 | 1+0 | 0 | 0+1 | 0 | 2+0 | 0 |
| 24 | DF | (Kenya) KEN | Vincent Harper | 13 | 0 | 6+5 | 0 | 0+1 | 0 | 0+0 | 0 | 1+0 | 0 |
| 25 | FW | (Republic of Ireland) IRL | Anthony Scully | 9 | 2 | 8+0 | 2 | 0+0 | 0 | 0+0 | 0 | 0+1 | 0 |
| 31 | MF | (Republic of Ireland) IRL | Jake Doyle-Hayes | 14 | 0 | 13+0 | 0 | 0+0 | 0 | 1+0 | 0 | 0+0 | 0 |
| 32 | FW | (England) ENG | Danny Rose | 5 | 1 | 3+1 | 0 | 0+0 | 0 | 0+0 | 0 | 1+0 | 1 |
| 40 | DF | (Wales) WAL | Ed James | 12 | 0 | 7+2 | 0 | 1+0 | 0 | 1+0 | 0 | 1+0 | 0 |
| 43 | DF | (England) ENG | Tobias Alsop | 3 | 0 | 0+0 | 0 | 0+0 | 0 | 0+0 | 0 | 1+2 | 0 |
| 46 | DF | (England) ENG | Louie Cayless | 3 | 1 | 0+0 | 0 | 0+0 | 0 | 0+0 | 0 | 3+0 | 1 |
| 47 | DF | (England) ENG | Liam Cartwright | 1 | 0 | 0+0 | 0 | 0+0 | 0 | 0+0 | 0 | 0+1 | 0 |
Player(s) who featured but departed the club during the season:
| 9 | FW | (England) ENG | Jayden Wareham | 3 | 0 | 2+0 | 0 | 0+0 | 0 | 1+0 | 0 | 0+0 | 0 |

=== Disciplinary record ===
As of match played 21 November 2026

| Rank | No. | Pos. | Player | League Two | | | FA Cup | | | EFL Cup | | | EFL Trophy | | | Total | | |
| Rank | No. | Pos. | Player | Yellow card | (yellow card) (yellow-red card) | Red card | Yellow card | (yellow card) (yellow-red card) | Red card | Yellow card | (yellow card) (yellow-red card) | Red card | Yellow card | (yellow card) (yellow-red card) | Red card | Yellow card | (yellow card) (yellow-red card) | Red card |
|---|---|---|---|---|---|---|---|---|---|---|---|---|---|---|---|---|---|---|
| 1 | 23 | LWB | (Scotland) Ethan Sutherland | 0 | 0 | 0 | 0 | 0 | 0 | 0 | 1 | 0 | 0 | 0 | 1 | 0 | 1 | 1 |
| 2 | 3 | CB | (England) Luca Woodhouse | 3 | 0 | 0 | 0 | 0 | 0 | 0 | 0 | 0 | 0 | 0 | 0 | 3 | 0 | 0 |
| 2 | 5 | CB | (England) Jack Fitzwater | 4 | 0 | 0 | 0 | 0 | 0 | 0 | 0 | 0 | 0 | 0 | 0 | 4 | 0 | 0 |
| 2 | 16 | CM | (Republic of Ireland) Charlie Cummins | 3 | 0 | 0 | 0 | 0 | 0 | 1 | 0 | 0 | 0 | 0 | 0 | 4 | 0 | 0 |
| 5 | 8 | CM | (England) Taylor Perry | 3 | 0 | 0 | 0 | 0 | 0 | 0 | 0 | 0 | 0 | 0 | 0 | 3 | 0 | 0 |
| 5 | 31 | CDM | (Republic of Ireland) Jake Doyle-Hayes | 3 | 0 | 0 | 0 | 0 | 0 | 0 | 0 | 0 | 0 | 0 | 0 | 3 | 0 | 0 |
| 7 | 7 | RW | (Wales) Gwion Edwards | 2 | 0 | 0 | 0 | 0 | 0 | 0 | 0 | 0 | 0 | 0 | 0 | 2 | 0 | 0 |
| 7 | 10 | CF | (England) Josh Gordon | 2 | 0 | 0 | 0 | 0 | 0 | 0 | 0 | 0 | 0 | 0 | 0 | 2 | 0 | 0 |
| 7 | 18 | LM | (England) Liam Oakes | 0 | 0 | 0 | 0 | 0 | 0 | 0 | 0 | 0 | 2 | 0 | 0 | 2 | 0 | 0 |
| 10 | 1 | GK | (England) Jack Bycroft | 0 | 0 | 0 | 0 | 0 | 0 | 1 | 0 | 0 | 0 | 0 | 0 | 1 | 0 | 0 |
| 10 | 6 | CB | (England) Jack Taylor | 1 | 0 | 0 | 0 | 0 | 0 | 0 | 0 | 0 | 0 | 0 | 0 | 1 | 0 | 0 |
| 10 | 9 | CF | (England) Jayden Wareham | 1 | 0 | 0 | 0 | 0 | 0 | 0 | 0 | 0 | 0 | 0 | 0 | 1 | 0 | 0 |
| 10 | 10 | CF | (England) Josh Gordon | 1 | 0 | 0 | 0 | 0 | 0 | 0 | 0 | 0 | 0 | 0 | 0 | 1 | 0 | 0 |
| 10 | 12 | CAM | (England) Reece Cole | 1 | 0 | 0 | 0 | 0 | 0 | 0 | 0 | 0 | 0 | 0 | 0 | 1 | 0 | 0 |
| 10 | 14 | CM | (England) Harry Kite | 0 | 0 | 0 | 0 | 0 | 0 | 0 | 0 | 0 | 1 | 0 | 0 | 1 | 0 | 0 |
| 10 | 24 | LWB | (Kenya) Vincent Harper | 1 | 0 | 0 | 0 | 0 | 0 | 0 | 0 | 0 | 0 | 0 | 0 | 1 | 0 | 0 |
| 10 | 32 | CF | (England) Danny Rose | 0 | 0 | 0 | 0 | 0 | 0 | 0 | 0 | 0 | 1 | 0 | 0 | 1 | 0 | 0 |
| 10 | 40 | CB | (Wales) Ed James | 0 | 0 | 0 | 0 | 0 | 0 | 0 | 0 | 0 | 1 | 0 | 0 | 1 | 0 | 0 |
| 10 | 43 | CB | (England) Tobias Alsop | 0 | 0 | 0 | 0 | 0 | 0 | 0 | 0 | 0 | 1 | 0 | 0 | 1 | 0 | 0 |
| 10 | 46 | CB | (England) Louie Cayless | 0 | 0 | 0 | 0 | 0 | 0 | 0 | 0 | 0 | 1 | 0 | 0 | 1 | 0 | 0 |
| Total | | | | 23 | 0 | 0 | 0 | 0 | 0 | 2 | 1 | 0 | 7 | 0 | 1 | 32 | 1 | 1 |

== Awards ==
=== Manager awards ===
==== EFL League Two Manager of the Month ====
| Month | Manager | Result | Ref. |
|---|---|---|---|
| October | (England) Matt Taylor | Nominated | |
