= 2026–27 FA Cup =

Football Association Challenge Cup
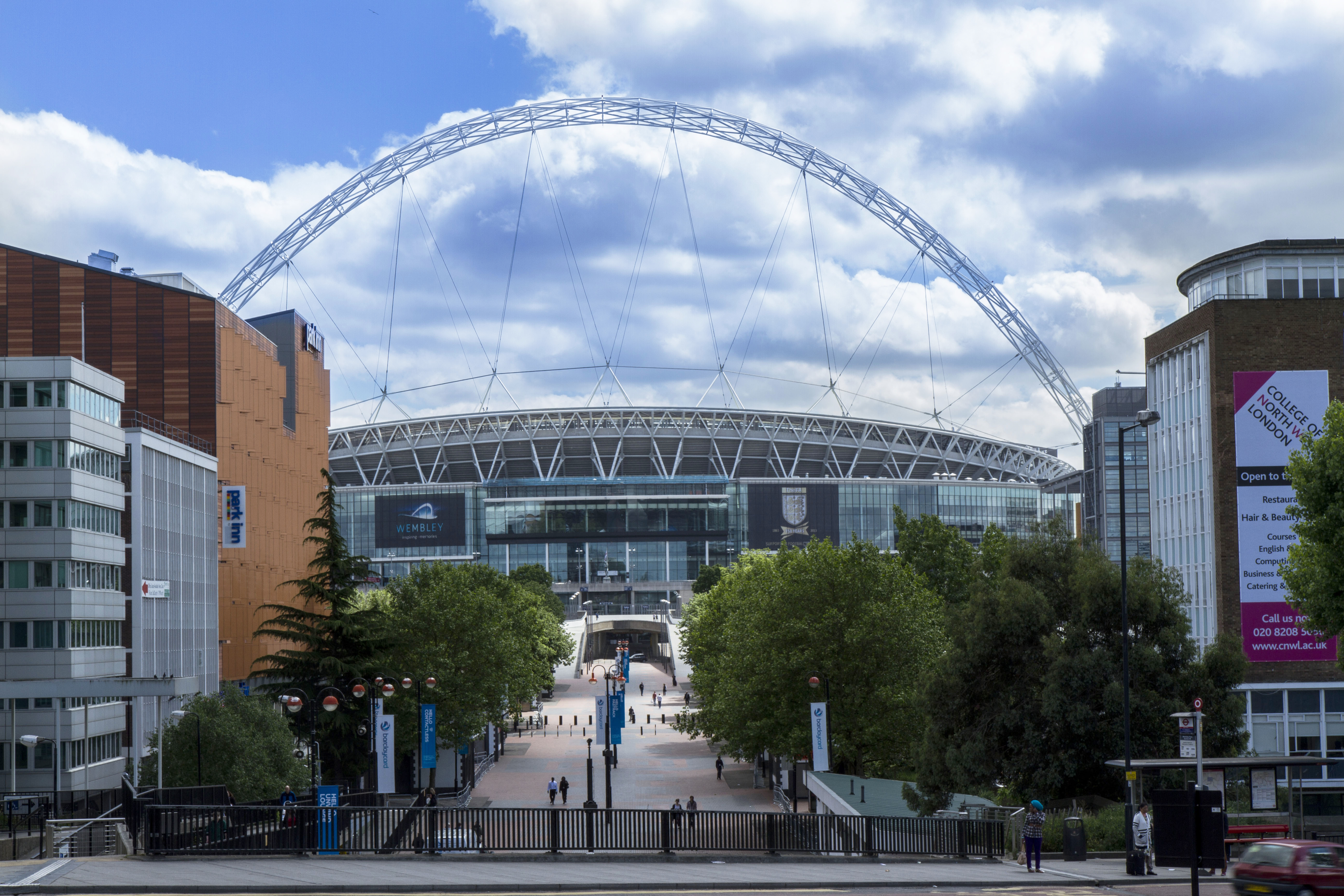
- Wembley Stadium will host the final

Tournament details
- Country: England; Wales
- Dates: 7 November 2026 – 22 May 2027
- Teams: 743; 651 (qualifying competition); 124 (main competition incl. 32 qualifiers)
- (Note: All statistics do not include qualifying competition)

The 2026–27 FA Cup is the 146th season of the Football Association Challenge Cup, the oldest football tournament in the world. It is sponsored by Emirates and known as the Emirates FA Cup for sponsorship purposes. The FA Cup is the main domestic cup competition for men's football teams in England. The qualifying competition began on 7 August 2026, with the tournament proper set to start on 7 November 2026. The final will be played at Wembley Stadium, London, on 22 May 2027.

Eight-time winners and defending champions, Manchester City, will enter the competition hoping to appear in their fifth consecutive FA Cup final.

== Teams, dates and regulations ==
The FA Cup is a knockout competition with 124 teams taking part from the first round proper, and all trying to reach the final at Wembley Stadium on 22 May 2027. The competition consists of the 92 teams from the Football League system (20 teams from the Premier League and the 72 in total from the EFL Championship, EFL League One and EFL League Two) plus the 32 surviving teams out of 651 teams from the National League System that started the competition in the qualifying rounds. The total 743 entrants was a decrease of 4 from the previous season.

Round	Main date (Saturdays)	Number of fixtures	Clubs remaining	New entries this round	Winner prize money	Loser prize money	Divisions entering this round
First round	7 November 2026	40	124 → 84	48	£47,750	£15,800	24 EFL League One teams 24 EFL League Two teams
Second round	5 December 2026	20	84 → 64	None	£79,500	£21,200	None
Third round	9 January 2027	32	64 → 32	44	£121,500	£26,500	20 Premier League teams 24 EFL Championship teams
Fourth round	13 February 2027	16	32 → 16	None	£127,000	None	None
Fifth round	6 March 2027	8	16 → 8	None	£238,500	None	None
Quarter-finals	3 April 2027	4	8 → 4	None	£477,000	None	None
Semi-finals	24 April 2027	2	4 → 2	None	£1,060,000	£530,000	None
Final	22 May 2027	1	2 → 1	None	£2,120,000	£1,060,000	None

== Rule changes ==
This is the third consecutive (and fourth overall) edition of the tournament to be played without replays in the proper rounds since 2020–21, following a six-year agreement beginning in 2024–25 between the FA and the Premier League, and the second consecutive edition of the tournament to have the final played one week before the end of the Premier League season.

== Qualifying ==
Teams that were not members of either the Premier League or English Football League competed in the qualifying rounds to secure one of 32 available places in the first round. The six-round qualifying competition began with the extra preliminary round on 7 August 2026, with the fourth and final qualifying round kicking off on 17 October.

== First round ==
A total of 80 teams played in the first round: 32 winners from the fourth qualifying round, 24 from League Two (tier 4), and 24 from League One (tier 3). AFC Rushden & Diamonds and Stafford Rangers from the 8th tier were the lowest-ranked teams remaining in the competition.

The draw was made on 19 October 2026.

Number of teams per tier still in competition
Premier League (Note: Premier League and Championship teams will join the competition in the third round.)	Championship	League One	League Two	Non-League	Total
20 / 20	24 / 24	24 / 24	24 / 24	32 / 32	124 / 124

6 November 2026	Bristol Rovers (4)	2–0	Cambridge United (3)	Bristol
19:30 GMT	Russell-Denny 58'; Cavegn 72'	Report		Stadium: Memorial Stadium; Attendance: 3,657; Referee: Jamie O'Connor

6 November 2026	Oxford City (6)	2–4	Leicester City (3)	Oxford
19:45 GMT	Pollock 31'; Ashby 62'	Report	Page 16'; Riis 53'; Doyle 59'; Watson 82'	Stadium: The MGroup Stadium; Attendance: 3,462; Referee: Andrew Humphries

7 November 2026	Dover Athletic (6)	2–0	Wealdstone (5)	Dover
15:00 GMT	Bates 14', 42'	Report		Stadium: Crabble Athletic Ground; Attendance: 1,913; Referee: Matthew Norton

7 November 2026	Mansfield Town (3)	3–0	Macclesfield (6)	Mansfield
15:00 GMT	Moriah-Welsh 21'; Oates 73'; Bowery 90+3'	Report		Stadium: Field Mill; Attendance: 4,436; Referee: Richie Watkins

7 November 2026	Huddersfield Town (3)	1–2	Exeter City (4)	Huddersfield
15:00 GMT	Bowat 54'	Report	Taylor 12'; Cummins 81'	Stadium: Kirklees Stadium; Attendance: 4,302; Referee: Matthew Russell

7 November 2026	Luton Town (3)	2–0	Forest Green Rovers (5)	Luton
15:00 GMT	Lawrence 4'; Clark 41'	Report		Stadium: Kenilworth Road; Attendance: 4,325; Referee: James Robinson

7 November 2026	Kidderminster Harriers (5)	3–0	Doncaster Rovers (3)	Kidderminster
15:00 GMT	Walker 22'; Kouhyar 36'; Davis 59'	Report		Stadium: Aggborough Stadium; Attendance: 3,706; Referee: Declan Bourne

7 November 2026	Leyton Orient (3)	5–1	Harborough Town (6)	Leyton
15:00 GMT	Dobra 6'; Connolly 25'; El Mizouni 50', 90+6'; Springett 81'	Report	Malone 69'	Stadium: Brisbane Road; Attendance: 5,958; Referee: Sunny Sukhvir Gill

7 November 2026	Accrington Stanley (4)	0–2	Wycombe Wanderers (3)	Accrington
15:00 GMT		Report	Taylor 5'; Harvie 69'	Stadium: Crown Ground; Attendance: 1,510; Referee: Dale Baines

7 November 2026	Milton Keynes Dons (3)	2–1	Swindon Town (4)	Milton Keynes
15:00 GMT	Ekpiteta 6'; Collins 13'	Report	Drinan 45+1'	Stadium: Stadium MK; Attendance: 3,601; Referee: Aaron Jackson

7 November 2026	Newport County (4)	3–1	Walsall (4)	Newport
15:00 GMT	Etete 19', 60'; Adu-Poku 23'	Report	Dallas 7'	Stadium: Rodney Parade; Attendance: 3,205; Referee: Robert Massey-Ellis

7 November 2026	Bromley (3)	0–2	Rotherham United (4)	Bromley
15:00 GMT		Report	Aljofree 45+1'; Bradshaw 56'	Stadium: Hayes Lane; Attendance: 2,044; Referee: Sam Mulhall

7 November 2026	Barnet (4)	3–0	Tranmere Rovers (4)	Edgware
15:00 GMT	Smith 80'; Ofoborh 90'; Ajayi 90+6'	Report		Stadium: The Hive Stadium; Attendance: 1,615; Referee: Carl Brook

7 November 2026	Fleetwood Town (4)	1–2 (a.e.t.)	Rochdale (4)	Fleetwood
15:00 GMT	Coughlan 74' (pen.)	Report	Hannant 24'; Adeeko 111'	Stadium: Highbury Stadium; Attendance: 2,026; Referee: William Davis

7 November 2026	Barnsley (3)	7–2	Aldershot Town (5)	Barnsley
15:00 GMT	McGeehan 20', 62', 67'; Cleary 26'; Yoganathan 33', 45+2'; Brownlie 87'	Report	Lewis 75', 86'	Stadium: Oakwell; Attendance: 3,701; Referee: Steven Copeland

7 November 2026	Chesterfield (4)	4–3	Yeovil Town (5)	Chesterfield
15:00 GMT	Simpson 43', 55'; Koroma 45'; Randall 89'	Report	Spasov 38' (pen.); Daly 78'; Muller 82'	Stadium: SMH Group Stadium; Attendance: 4,010; Referee: Scott Oldham

7 November 2026	Gillingham (4)	0–1	Barrow (5)	Gillingham
15:00 GMT		Report	Cameron 90+2'	Stadium: Priestfield Stadium; Attendance: 4,125; Referee: Harry Wager

7 November 2026	Harrogate Town (5)	1–4	AFC Fylde (5)	Harrogate
15:00 GMT	McGowan 9'	Report	Thomas 16'; Drewe 60'; T. Whelan 78' (pen.); Matthews-Lewis 82'	Stadium: Wetherby Road; Attendance: 2,375; Referee: Declan Brown

7 November 2026	Crewe Alexandra (4)	2–1	AFC Wimbledon (3)	Crewe
15:00 GMT	McNeill 12'; Thomas 62'	Report	Yiadom 82'	Stadium: Gresty Road; Attendance: 3,015; Referee: Matt Donohue

7 November 2026	Oxford United (3)	0–1	Stevenage (3)	Oxford
15:00 GMT		Report	Piergianni 4'	Stadium: Kassam Stadium; Attendance: 2,885; Referee: Paul Howard

7 November 2026	Burton Albion (3)	4–0	AFC Rushden & Diamonds (8)	Burton upon Trent
15:00 GMT	Collar 23'; Borges Rodrigues 35'; Webster 75'; Scutt 90+5'	Report		Stadium: Pirelli Stadium; Attendance: 4,086; Referee: Gareth Thomas

7 November 2026	Port Vale (4)	4–2	Scunthorpe United (5)	Stoke-on-Trent
15:00 GMT	Figueroa 8'; Hernández 58'; Watters 61'; Lynch 90+5'	Report	Norwood 86'; D. Howe 90'	Stadium: Vale Park; Attendance: 3,985; Referee: George Laflin

7 November 2026	Cheltenham Town (4)	2–0	FC Halifax Town (5)	Cheltenham
15:00 GMT	Evans 16'; Miller 90+3'	Report		Stadium: Whaddon Road; Attendance: 2,961; Referee: Ollie Yates

7 November 2026	Colchester United (4)	1–0	Worcester City (7)	Colchester
15:00 GMT	Jad. Williams 32'	Report		Stadium: Colchester Community Stadium; Attendance: 3,004; Referee: Alan Young

7 November 2026	Eastleigh (5)	1–2	Shrewsbury Town (4)	Eastleigh
15:00 GMT	Randall-Hurren 79'	Report	Lloyd 38' (pen.); Fletcher 87'	Stadium: Ten Acres; Attendance: 1,770; Referee: Craig Hicks

7 November 2026	Plymouth Argyle (3)	4–0	Alvechurch (7)	Plymouth
15:00 GMT	Evans 50', 69'; Baidoo 78'; Curtis 80'	Report		Stadium: Home Park; Attendance: 10,426; Referee: Elliott Swallow

7 November 2026	Hornchurch (5)	1–2 (a.e.t.)	Blackpool (3)	Hornchurch
15:00 GMT	Hearn 30'	Report	Brown 56'; Bowler 118'	Stadium: Hornchurch Stadium; Attendance: 2,124; Referee: Harrison Blair

7 November 2026	Guiseley (7)	1–0	Sutton United (5)	Guiseley
15:00 GMT	Thewlis 90+5' (pen.)	Report		Stadium: Nethermoor Park; Attendance: 1,556; Referee: Zac Kennard-Kettle

7 November 2026	Bradford City (3)	7–0	Marine (6)	Bradford
15:00 GMT	Powell 10', 16'; Phillips 21', 87'; Pennington 33'; Swan 58'; Lapslie 73'	Report		Stadium: Valley Parade; Attendance: 7,149; Referee: Andrew Miller

7 November 2026	York City (4)	4–0	Northampton Town (4)	York
15:00 GMT	Pearce 1', 11'; A. Hunt 29'; Stones 81'	Report		Stadium: York Community Stadium; Attendance: 4,273; Referee: Martin Coy

7 November 2026	Boreham Wood (5)	0–3	Wigan Athletic (3)	Borehamwood
15:00 GMT		Report	Mellish 11'; Fox 36', 74'	Stadium: Meadow Park; Attendance: 2,031; Referee: Oliver Mackey

7 November 2026	Carlisle United (5)	1–0	Salford City (4)	Carlisle
15:00 GMT	Ajiboye 44'	Report		Stadium: Brunton Park; Attendance: 5,641; Referee: Paul Marsden

7 November 2026	Salisbury (6)	6–0	Sholing (7)	Salisbury
15:00 GMT	Odokonyero 31', 53'; Hedges 33' (pen.); Sivi 39'; Russe 89'; Bartolo 90+3'	Report		Stadium: Raymond McEnhill Stadium; Attendance: 3,450; Referee: Stephen Parkinson

7 November 2026	Altrincham (5)	2–2 (a.e.t.) (2–3 p)	Notts County (3)	Altrincham
17:30 GMT	Weaver 39'; Banks 59'	Report	Bedeau 28'; Roberts 84'	Stadium: Moss Lane; Attendance: 4,419; Referee: David Rock
	Penalties
	Barlow (penalty missed); Dennis (penalty scored); Taylor (penalty missed); Jones (penalty missed); Hinchy (penalty scored)		(penalty scored) Sanders; (penalty scored) Roberts; (penalty missed) Palmer; (penalty missed) Gibbons; (penalty scored) Longelo

7 November 2026	Peterborough United (3)	0–5	Reading (3)	Peterborough
20:00 GMT		Report	Kyerewaa 26'; Marriott 34'; Savage 45+4'; Reid 72', 76'	Stadium: London Road Stadium; Attendance: 4,003; Referee: Dean Whitestone

8 November 2026	Stafford Rangers (8)	3–3 (a.e.t.) (2–3 p)	Grimsby Town (4)	Stafford
12:00 GMT	Mason 3', 93'; Birch 43'	Report	Rodgers 74'; Kacurri 76'; Turi 107'	Stadium: Marston Road; Attendance: 3,113; Referee: Isaac Searle
	Penalties
	Birch (penalty missed); Banks (penalty scored); Washington (penalty missed); Sambor (penalty scored); Navarro (penalty missed)		(penalty missed) Walker; (penalty scored) Cook; (penalty scored) Doyle; (penalty scored) Amaluzor

8 November 2026	Cray Wanderers (7)	2–3 (a.e.t.)	Stockport County (3)	Chislehurst
14:15 GMT	McLeod 21'; Hernandez 36'	Report	Wootton 81'; Mandron 90+1'; Fiorini 101' (pen.)	Stadium: Flamingo Park; Attendance: 2,372; Referee: Lewis Sandoe

8 November 2026	Wimborne Town (7)	2–0	Crawley Town (4)	Wimborne Minster
15:00 GMT	Seung-woo 9'; Munn 79'	Report		Stadium: The Wyatt Homes Stadium; Attendance: 3,250; Referee: Kirsty Dowle

8 November 2026	Oldham Athletic (4)	2–1 (a.e.t.)	Sheffield Wednesday (3)	Oldham
17:15 GMT	Kavanagh 66'; Sutton 110'	Report	Keillor-Dunn 76'	Stadium: Boundary Park; Attendance: 6,545; Referee: Martin Woods

9 November 2026	Plymouth Parkway (7)	2–1 (a.e.t.)	Berkhamsted (7)	Plymouth
19:30 GMT	Neal 73' (pen.), 105+1' (pen.)	Report	Andrews 47'	Stadium: Bolitho Park; Referee: Ross Martin

=== Upsets ===
Giantkiller (tier)	Opponent (tier)
Upset of three leagues above
Wimborne Town (level 7)	2–0 at home vs Crawley Town (level 4)
Upset of two leagues above
Kidderminster Harriers (level 5)	2–0 at home vs Doncaster Rovers (level 3)
Guiseley (level 7)	1–0 at home vs Sutton United (level 5)

== Second round ==
A total of 40 teams will play in the second round, all being winners from the first round. Guiseley, Wimborne Town, and Plymouth Parkway from the 7th tier are the lowest-ranked teams remaining in the competition.

The draw was made on 9 November 2026.

Number of teams per tier still in competition
Premier League	Championship	League One	League Two	Non-League	Total
20 / 20	24 / 24	16 / 24	15 / 24	9 / 32	84 / 124

4 December 2026	Wimborne Town (7)	v	Bradford City (3)	Wimborne Minster
19:30 GMT				Stadium: The Wyatt Homes Stadium

4 December 2026	Wycombe Wanderers (3)	v	Milton Keynes Dons (3)	High Wycombe
19:45 GMT				Stadium: Adams Park

5 December 2026	Chesterfield (4)	v	Cheltenham Town (4)	Chesterfield
15:00 GMT				Stadium: SMH Group Stadium

5 December 2026	Wigan Athletic (3)	v	Barnsley (3)	Wigan
15:00 GMT				Stadium: Brick Community Stadium

5 December 2026	Exeter City (4)	v	Stevenage (3)	Exeter
15:00 GMT				Stadium: St James Park

5 December 2026	York City (4)	v	Carlisle United (5)	York
15:00 GMT				Stadium: York Community Stadium

5 December 2026	Colchester United (4)	v	Mansfield Town (3)	Colchester
15:00 GMT				Stadium: Colchester Community Stadium

5 December 2026	Rochdale (4)	v	Newport County (4)	Rochdale
15:00 GMT				Stadium: Spotland Stadium

5 December 2026	Port Vale (4)	v	Leyton Orient (3)	Stoke-on-Trent
15:00 GMT				Stadium: Vale Park

5 December 2026	Grimsby Town (4)	v	Oldham Athletic (4)	Cleethorpes
15:00 GMT				Stadium: Blundell Park

5 December 2026	Shrewsbury Town (4)	v	Burton Albion (3)	Shrewsbury
15:00 GMT				Stadium: New Meadow

5 December 2026	Rotherham United (4)	v	Bristol Rovers (4)	Rotherham
15:00 GMT				Stadium: New York Stadium

5 December 2026	Reading (3)	v	Stockport County (3)	Reading
15:00 GMT				Stadium: Madejski Stadium

5 December 2026	Dover Athletic (6)	v	Leicester City (3)	Dover
17:15 GMT				Stadium: Crabble Athletic Ground

5 December 2026	Barrow (5)	v	Kidderminster Harriers (5)	Barrow-in-Furness
20:00 GMT				Stadium: Holker Street

6 December 2026	Salisbury (6)	v	Blackpool (3)	Salisbury
12:15 GMT				Stadium: Raymond McEnhill Stadium

6 December 2026	AFC Fylde (5)	v	Luton Town (3)	Medlar-with-Wesham
14:30 GMT				Stadium: Mill Farm Sports Village

6 December 2026	Crewe Alexandra (4)	v	Plymouth Argyle (3)	Crewe
15:15 GMT				Stadium: Gresty Road

6 December 2026	Plymouth Parkway (7)	v	Barnet (4)	Plymouth
17:30 GMT				Stadium: Bolitho Park

7 December 2026	Guiseley (7)	v	Notts County (3)	Guiseley
19:30 GMT				Stadium: Nethermoor Park

== Top goalscorers ==
As of matches played 9 November 2026

Rank	Player	Club	Goals
1	(Northern Ireland) Cameron McGeehan	Barnsley	3
2	(England) Jack Bates	Dover Athletic	2
2	(Tunisia) Idris El Mizouni	Leyton Orient	2
2	(England) Kion Etete	Newport County	2
2	(Wales) Vimal Yoganathan	Barnsley	2
2	(England) Jack Simpson	Chesterfield	2
2	(Wales) Will Evans	Plymouth Argyle	2
2	(England) Nick Powell	Bradford City	2
2	(England) Adam Phillips	Bradford City	2
2	(England) Ollie Pearce	York City	2
2	(Wales) Morgan Fox	Wigan Athletic	2
2	(England) Nathan Odokonyero	Salisbury	2
2	(Northern Ireland) Jamie Reid	Reading	2
2	(England) Darrhyl Mason	Stafford Rangers	2
2	(England) Rocky Neal	Plymouth Parkway	2

== Television rights ==
A four-year television deal began with the 2025–26 FA Cup, under which broadcast rights were held by TNT Sports, with a guarantee of free-to-air matches being obtained by an agreement to show 14 matches on the BBC.

Broadcaster	Summary
BBC Sport	14 live matches per season, all to be shared with TNT Sports. BBC Sport has two matches per round up to and including the quarter-finals, plus one semi-final and the final.
TNT Sports	Selected matches from the first and second round, and all matches from the third round onwards (including those on the BBC) which do not kick off at 3 pm on a Saturday.

Round	Date	Fixture	Kick-off	Channels	
Round	Date	Fixture	Kick-off	TV	Digital
First round	6 November 2026	Oxford City v Leicester City	19:30	TNT Sports 1	HBO Max
First round	7 November 2026	Altrincham v Notts County	17:30	BBC Two TNT Sports 1	BBC iPlayer; HBO Max
First round	7 November 2026	Peterborough United v Reading	20:00	TNT Sports 1 TNT Sports 2	HBO Max
First round	8 November 2026	Stafford Rangers v Grimsby Town	12:00	TNT Sports 1	HBO Max
First round	8 November 2026	Cray Wanderers v Stockport County	14:15	BBC Two TNT Sports 3	BBC iPlayer; HBO Max
First round	8 November 2026	Wimborne Town v Crawley Town	15:00	TNT Sports 1	HBO Max
First round	8 November 2026	Oldham Athletic v Sheffield Wednesday	17:15	TNT Sports 1 TNT Sports 3	HBO Max
First round	9 November 2026	Plymouth Parkway v Berkhamsted	19:30	TNT Sports 1	HBO Max
Second round	4 December 2026	Wimborne Town v Bradford City	19:30	TNT Sports 1	HBO Max
Second round	5 December 2026	Dover Athletic v Leicester City	17:15	BBC Two TNT Sports 2	BBC iPlayer; HBO Max
Second round	5 December 2026	Barrow v Kidderminster Harriers	20:00	TNT Sports 1	HBO Max
Second round	6 December 2026	Salisbury v Blackpool	12:15	BBC Two TNT Sports 2	BBC iPlayer; HBO Max
Second round	6 December 2026	AFC Fylde v Luton Town	14:30	TNT Sports 1	HBO Max
Second round	6 December 2026	Crewe Alexandra v Plymouth Argyle	15:15	TNT Sports 2	HBO Max
Second round	6 December 2026	Plymouth Parkway v Barnet	17:30	TNT Sports 1	HBO Max
Second round	7 December 2026	Guiseley v Notts County	19:30	TNT Sports 1	HBO Max
