= Arnold Mitchell =

Arnold Mitchell can refer to:

- Arnold Mitchell (social scientist) (1918–1985), American social scientist
- Arnold Mitchell (footballer) (1929–2014), English footballer
- Arnold Mitchell (architect) (1863–1944), English architect
