= Nobby Clarke (disambiguation) =

Nobby Clarke (1907–1981) was an English footballer.

Nobby Clarke may also refer to:

- Cecil Vandepeer Clarke (1897–1961), British engineer, inventor, and soldier nicknamed "Nobby"
- Alfred "Nobby" Clarke (fl. late 1800s), San Francisco landowner; see Alfred E. Clarke Mansion, also known as "Nobby Clarke's Folly"
