= Plymouth Parkway F.C. =

English football club

Coordinates: 50°24′28″N 4°08′50″W

Plymouth Parkway
- Full name: Plymouth Parkway Football Club
- Nickname: The Parkway
- Founded: 1988 (as Ex-Air Flyers)
- Ground: Bolitho Park, Plymouth
- Capacity: 3,500 (260 seated)
- Chairman: Mark Russell
- Manager: Karl Curtis
- League: Southern League Premier Division South
- 2025–26: Southern League Premier Division South, 11th of 22
- Website: www.ppfc.co.uk
Home colours	Away colours

Plymouth Parkway Football Club is a football club based in Plymouth, Devon, England. They are currently members of the Southern League Premier Division South and play at Bolitho Park.

== History ==
The club was originally formed by Stuart Cadmore in 1988 when a group of players left the youth team Plymouth Kolts and joined the Plymouth & District League in Division 4. In that same year the club secured sponsorship from Exeter Airport, and as part of that deal they changed their name to Ex-Air Flyers. They were the first club in Plymouth to be sponsored from outside the city limits. The club colours of yellow and blue are from the colours of the airport logo and remain the same today.

In their first season, the club gained promotion and then moved the Parkway Sports Club. The club carried on to be promoted in successive seasons, until it reached Division one and was waiting to join the Premier Division when the Devon League was formed in 1992. The club decided to apply to become members of the Devon League instead as the Parkway Sports Club had sufficient facilities to join the league. The club was accepted into the league but the club had to change its name, so they became known as EAF Plymouth FC.

Before the 1993–94 season, the Sports Club offered a number of extra facilities and help to the club, so the club changed their name to Plymouth Parkway FC. Five seasons later in 1998, the club left the Devon league to join the South Western League. On the eve of the 2000–01 season, the club became homeless with the loss of the Parkway Sports Club due to a disagreement over the terms of the lease and subsequent maintenance costs. As a result, and with special permission from the league, the club spent that season having to play all of its games away from home. During its build-up to the 2001/02 season, the club announced it would be developing an area of Manadon as its new ground, to be known as Bolitho Park. While work was being completed, with controversial assistance from Plymouth City Council, they used The Brickfields athletics ground in Devonport, before they moved to their new and current home in August 2003.

In the 2006–07 season, the club entered the FA Vase for the first time, making it to the second qualifying round in their first attempt. A season later, the club became founding members of the South West Peninsula League, when the South Western Football League and the Devon County Football League merged.

In the summer of 2016, Parkway merged with Plymouth and West Devon Football League club Bar Sol Ona, whose team became the Parkway Reserves in the East Cornwall League. It is here where Parkway got the design for their previous FC Barcelona-esque away kit from.

In 2018, the club gained promotion to the Western League. In 2021, it was promoted to the Southern League and in the subsequent year they were promoted from Division One South to Premier Division South.

On 9 November 2026, Plymouth Parkway reached the second round proper of the FA Cup for the first time in their history after beating Berkhamsted 2–1 after extra time at Bolitho Park. Rocky Neal scored two penalties to give the home side an historic win after going behind early in the second half.

== Ground ==
Plymouth Parkway play their games at Bolitho Park, St. Peters Road, Plymouth, PL5 3JG. The ground has floodlights, a clubhouse, and has a capacity of 3,500 standing and two covered seating areas for around 250 people. In 2021, a programme of improvements were undertaken.

== Current squad ==
Note: Flags indicate national team as defined under FIFA eligibility rules; some limited exceptions apply. Players may hold more than one non-FIFA nationality.

No.	Pos.	Nation	Player
1	GK	ENG	Aaron Dearing
2	DF	ENG	Jensen Ireland
3	DF	ENG	Joel Sullivan
4	MF	ENG	Ryan Brett
5	DF	ENG	Ed Palmer
6	DF	ENG	Toby Down
7	DF	ENG	Mikey Williams
8	MF	ENG	Callum Hall
9	FW	ENG	Rocky Neal
10	MF	ENG	Rio Garside (captain)

No.	Pos.	Nation	Player
11	FW	ENG	Hayden Turner
12	FW	ENG	Reece Thomson
14	DF	ENG	Ethan Wright
15	MF	ENG	Ed Harrison
17	FW	ENG	Henry Donovan
18	FW	ENG	Will Sullivan
19	FW	ENG	Jack Brimming
20	MF	ENG	Carlo Garside
21	DF	ENG	Jack Matthews (on loan from Truro City)
—	MF	ENG	Jake Smith

=== Out on loan ===
Note: Flags indicate national team as defined under FIFA eligibility rules; some limited exceptions apply. Players may hold more than one non-FIFA nationality.

No. / Pos. / Nation / Player	No. / Pos. / Nation / Player

== Honours ==
- Pitching in Southern League Division One South:
  - Winners (1): 2021–22
- Les Phillips Cup
  - Winners (1): 2018–19
- South West Peninsula League Premier Division:
  - Winners (1): 2013–14, 2017–18
  - Runners-up (2): 2008–09, 2012–13
- Plymouth & District League Division 2:
  - Winners (1): 1990–91
- Throgmorton cup
  - Winners (1): 2010–11 2013–14
- Devon Premier Cup:
  - Runners-up (3): 2003–04, 2004–05, 2005–06
- Plymouth & District League Division 3 Cup:
  - Runners-up (1): 1989–90
- Plymouth & District League Division 4 Cup:
  - Winners (1): 1988–89
- George Gillin Trophy:
  - Winners (1): 2001–02
  - Runners-up (2): 1997–98, 2002–03
- Stafford Williams Trophy:
  - Runners-up (2): 2000–01, 2001–02
- Charity Bowl:
  - Winners (1): 2014–15
- Edenvale Turf St Luke's Bowl:
  - Winners (1): 2013–14, 2017–2018
  - Super Bowl Winners (1): – 2012

== Records ==
- Highest League Position: 10th in Pitching in Southern League Premier Division South 2022–23
- FA Cup best performance: Second Round Proper, 2026-27 (to play Barnet)
- FA Trophy best performance: Fourth round, 2021–22 (lost to Spennymoor Town)
- FA Vase best performance: Quarter-finals, 2019–20 (lost to Hebburn Town)
- Highest League attendance: 1,385 vs Truro City, 26th December 2022

== Club officials and staff ==
Position	Name(s)
Co-Chairmen:	Mark Russell, Muizz Mirza
Vice-chairman:	Gez Baggott
Club Secretary:	Genny Turner
Manager:	Karl Curtis
Assistant Manager:	Matt Godfree
Head Coach:	Lee Peacock
Goalkeeper Coach:	Stuart Dudley
Life Vice-presidents:	Jim Parsons, Colin Edwards, Gary Doel, Charlie Baggott, Stuart Cadmore, Vic Easterbrook, Alan Horswell & Mark Young
Groundsmen:
Stadium Manager:	Danny Tune

== See also ==
- Plymouth Parkway F.C. players
