= Sonny Cox (footballer) =

English footballer

Personal information
- Full name: Sonny Cox
- Date of birth: 11 October 2004 (age 22)
- Place of birth: Exeter, England
- Height: 1.78 m (5 ft 10 in)
- Position: Forward

Team information
- Current team: Exeter City
- Number: 19

Youth career
- 2011–2021: Exeter City

Senior career*
Years	Team	Apps	(Gls)
2021–	Exeter City	101	(10)
2022	→ Weston-super-Mare (loan)	16	(5)
2022–2023	→ Bath City (loan)	19	(5)
2023	→ Yeovil Town (loan)	9	(2)
- * Club domestic league appearances and goals as of 21:10, 1 November 2026 (UTC)

Sonny Cox (born 11 October 2004) is an English professional footballer who plays as a forward for EFL League Two club Exeter City.

== Early and personal life ==
Cox attended Exmouth Community College.

== Playing career ==
Cox signed his first professional contract with Exeter City in July 2021, at the age of sixteen, having been with the club since the age of seven. He had spent a week on trial at Manchester United earlier in the year. He made his first-team debut on 5 October, he came on as a 49th-minute substitute for Archie Collins in a 2–2 draw at Cheltenham Town in the EFL Trophy.

On 21 January 2022, Cox joined Southern League Premier Division South side Weston-super-Mare on loan for the remainder of the 2021–22 season.

The beginning of the 2022-23 season saw Cox feature in the first-team squad more prominently, including appearing off the bench in 5 league games. Cox netted a debut first-team goal for Exeter in the closing stages of a 2–4 defeat at home to Oxford United on the 15 October 2022.

On 26 December 2022, it was confirmed that Cox had joined National League South side Bath City on an initial one-month loan. The loan deal was extended until the end of the season on 28 January 2023.

On 17 October 2023, Cox joined National League South side Yeovil Town on loan until January 2024. On 14 December 2023, Cox was recalled from his loan spell at Yeovil Town. On 6 March 2024, he signed a new contract, keeping him at Exeter until 2026.

== Career statistics ==
As of match played 31 October 2026

Appearances and goals by club, season and competition
Club	Season	League			FA Cup		EFL Cup		Other		Total	
Club	Season	Division	Apps	Goals	Apps	Goals	Apps	Goals	Apps	Goals	Apps	Goals
Exeter City	2021–22	League Two	0	0	0	0	0	0	2 (Note: Appearance(s) in EFL Trophy)	0	2	0
Exeter City	2022–23	League One	12	1	0	0	2	0	3	0	17	1
Exeter City	2023–24	League One	32	5	0	0	3	0	2	0	37	5
Exeter City	2024–25	League One	23	1	1	0	0	0	3	0	27	1
Exeter City	2025–26	League One	24	1	0	0	1	0	1	0	26	1
Exeter City	2026–27	League Two	10	2	0	0	0	0	1	0	11	2
Exeter City	Total		101	10	1	0	6	0	12	0	120	10
Weston–super–Mare (loan)	2021–22	Southern League; Premier Division South	16	5	0	0	—		2 (Note: One appearance in the Somerset Premier Cup, and one appearance and one goal in the Southern Football League play-offs)	1	18	6
Bath City (loan)	2022–23	National League South	19	5	—		—		3 (Note: One appearance in FA Trophy, two appearances and three goals in Somerset Premier Cup)	3	22	8
Yeovil Town (loan)	2023–24	National League South	9	2	2	0	—		1 (Note: Appearance in FA Trophy)	0	12	2
Career total			145	22	3	0	6	0	18	4	172	26
