= Lakyle Samuel =

English footballer (born 2006)

Personal information
- Date of birth: 6 May 2006 (age 20)
- Place of birth: Warwickshire, England
- Height: 1.75 m (5 ft 9 in)
- Position: Right-back

Team information
- Current team: Exeter City (on loan from Manchester City)
- Number: 2

Youth career
- 2014–: Manchester City

Senior career*
Years	Team	Apps	(Gls)
2025–	Manchester City	0	(0)
2025–2026	→ Bromley (loan)	6	(0)
2026–	→ Exeter City (loan)	14	(1)

International career^{‡}
2021–2022	England U-16	9	(0)
2022–2023	England U-17	17	(1)
2023	England U-18	5	(1)
2025–	England U-20	2	(0)
- * Club domestic league appearances and goals as of 17:07, 14 November 2026 (UTC) ‡ National team caps and goals as of 15:19, 11 October 2025 (UTC)

Lakyle Samuel (born 6 May 2006) is an English professional footballer who plays as a right-back for Exeter City on loan from Manchester City. He is an England youth international.

== Early life ==
He is the son of former Premier League footballer Jlloyd Samuel and his first wife Emma. He has siblings Javarne and Amara. Through his father, Samuel is of Trinidadian descent.

== Club career ==
Samuel joined the academy of Manchester City aged eight, at the youngest age group of under-9s. A right back, he was captain of the Man City U18 team during the 2023–24 season.

On 1 September 2025, Samuel joined League Two club Bromley on a season-long loan. On 13 September, he made his senior debut as a half-time substitute in a 1–0 defeat to Oldham Athletic.

On 14 August 2026, Samuel returned to League Two, joining Exeter City on a season-long loan. On 14 November 2026, he scored a first senior goal in a 1–0 victory over Cheltenham Town, with what was described by manager Matt Taylor as a 'mishit cross' in a man-of-the-match performance.

== International career ==
Samuel is an England youth international. He captained England under-17 to a fifth place finish at the 2023 UEFA European Under-17 Championship. Later that year he led the side during the 2023 FIFA U-17 World Cup starting all four of their fixtures at the tournament including the round of sixteen elimination against Uzbekistan.

== Career statistics ==
As of match played 14 November 2026

Appearances and goals by club, season and competition
Club	Season	League			FA Cup		League Cup		Other		Total	
Club	Season	Division	Apps	Goals	Apps	Goals	Apps	Goals	Apps	Goals	Apps	Goals
Manchester City U21	2022–23	—			—		—		1 (Note: Appearance(s) in EFL Trophy)	0	1	0
Manchester City U21	2023–24	—			—		—		3	0	3	0
Manchester City U21	2024–25	—			—		—		3	0	3	0
Manchester City U21	2025–26	—			—		—		1	0	1	0
Manchester City U21	Total				—		—		8	0	8	0
Bromley (loan)	2025–26	League Two	6	0	1	0	0	0	0	0	7	0
Exeter City (loan)	2026–27	League Two	14	1	1	0	0	0	3	0	18	1
Career total			20	1	2	0	0	0	11	0	33	1
