= Arnold Mitchell (footballer) =

English footballer (1929–2014)

Personal information
- Full name: Arnold Mitchell
- Date of birth: 1 December 1929
- Place of birth: Rotherham, Yorkshire, England
- Date of death: 19 October 2014 (aged 84)
- Place of death: Exeter, England
- Position: Right half

Youth career
- Sheffield Wednesday

Senior career*
Years	Team	Apps	(Gls)
1949–1950	Derby County	0	(0)
1950–1951	Nottingham Forest	0	(0)
1951–1952	Notts County	1	(0)
1952–1966	Exeter City	495	(44)
1966–1967	Taunton Town	?	(?)
- * Club domestic league appearances and goals

Arnold Mitchell (1 December 1929 – 19 October 2014) was an English professional footballer who played in the Football League as a right half.
