= Bolitho Park =

Football stadium in Plymouth, England

- Interactive map of Bolitho Park
- Address: St Peters Road; Manadon; Plymouth; England
- Coordinates: 50°24′30″N 4°08′49″W
- Owner: Plymouth Parkway F.C.
- Capacity: 3,500 (250 seated)
- Surface: Grass

Construction
- Opened: August 2003

Tenants
- Plymouth Parkway (2003–present); Truro City (2021–2024)

Bolitho Park is a football stadium in Plymouth, England, which is the home of Plymouth Parkway, of The Southern League Premier Division South. It currently has a capacity of 3,500, 250 seated.

Between 2021 and 2024, it was also the home of Truro City, now of The National League South.

The site shares an entrance point with the Manadon Sports Hub, home of Plymouth Argyle L.F.C.

== History ==
Plymouth Parkway moved into the purpose built site in August 2003. The Bolitho Park name comes from local novelist Janie Bolitho, who was Parkway's first sponsor when the club was in the South Western League. During this period, the club wore titles of her books on their shirts. In 2002, during the construction of Bolitho Park, she fell victim to breast cancer. With the support of her husband, Jim Parsons, and the agreement of Plymouth City Council, the ground was named in her honour.

In 2021, with Truro City completing a ground share with Parkway, Bolitho Park underwent renovations to meet stadium grade requirements. Unfortunately due to the clubs ongoing issues with pitch the arrangement was terminated in January 2024 and Truro moved into a new stadium in August 2024.
