= Nobby Clarke =

English footballer

Personal information
- Full name: Reginald Leonard Clarke
- Date of birth: 4 September 1907
- Place of birth: Heavitree, England
- Date of death: 1981 (aged 73–74)
- Place of death: Seaton, England
- Position: Wing half

Senior career*
Years	Team	Apps	(Gls)
- Hems Athletic
- Exeter Loco
1925–1926	Friernhay		
1926–1927	Southern Railway		
1927–1937	Exeter City	315	(18)
1937–1939	Aldershot	62	(3)
1939–1940	Torquay United (guest)	20	(1)
1942	Leeds United (guest)	1	(0)
1943	Clapton Orient (guest)	2	(1)
- * Club domestic league appearances and goals

Reginald Leonard Clarke (4 September 1907 – 1981), sometimes known as Nobby Clarke or Reg Clarke, was an English professional footballer who made more than 310 appearances as a wing half in the Football League for Exeter City. He is a member of the club's Hall of Fame.

== Personal life ==
In 1936, Clarke became the landlord of The Volunteer Inn pub in Ottery St Mary, which, owing to his Exeter City contract stipulating that players were forbidden to be involved in the licensing trade, necessitated his departure from the club. After retiring from football, he ran The King's Arms pub in Seaton and was a club official at Seaton Town.

== Honours ==
Friernhay

- Devon Senior Cup: 1925–26

Individual

- Exeter City Hall of Fame
