= Jack Taylor (footballer, born 2005) =

Association football player

Personal information
- Full name: Jack Paul Taylor
- Date of birth: 12 April 2005 (age 21)
- Height: 6 ft 4 in (1.93 m)
- Position: Centre-back

Team information
- Current team: Exeter City (on loan from Stevenage)
- Number: 6

Youth career
- 2021–2022: Eastbourne Borough
- 2022: Sutton United

Senior career*
Years	Team	Apps	(Gls)
2022	Eastbourne Borough	0	(0)
2022–2026	Sutton United	37	(2)
2023	→ Burgess Hill Town (loan)	19	(1)
2024	→ Hornchurch (loan)	9	(1)
2024–2025	→ Hampton & Richmond Borough (loan)	20	(1)
2026–	Stevenage	0	(0)
2026–	→ Exeter City (loan)	0	(0)
- * Club domestic league appearances and goals as of 14:06, 1 September 2026 (UTC)

Jack Paul Taylor (born 12 April 2005) is a professional footballer who plays as a centre-back for EFL League Two club Exeter City, on loan from EFL League One club Stevenage.

Taylor began his career in the under-18 team at Eastbourne Borough before joining Sutton United in 2022. After loan spells in the Isthmian League with Burgess Hill Town and Hornchurch, he made his senior debut for Sutton during the 2023–24 season. He spent the first half of the 2024–25 season on loan at National League South club Hampton & Richmond Borough. Taylor joined Stevenage for a five-figure fee in January 2026 before moving to Exeter City on loan in September 2026.

== Early life ==
Taylor moved from South London to the Eastbourne area in 2021 and enrolled at Bexhill College in September of that year. He studied A-levels in biology, psychology and economics and was a member of the college's Football Academy.

== Career ==
=== Sutton United ===
Taylor joined Eastbourne Borough's under-18 team in 2021, with the academy run jointly by the club and Bexhill College Football Academy. He was invited to train with the first team in May 2022 and was subsequently named in the matchday squad for the club's National League South play-off match against Oxford City. He signed a two-year scholarship with Sutton United's academy ahead of the 2022–23 season before joining Isthmian League South East Division club Burgess Hill Town on a work-experience loan in August 2023. He made 26 appearances during the first half of the 2023–24 season, scoring his first senior goal in a 4–2 defeat to Lancing on 26 December 2023.

Taylor joined Isthmian League Premier Division club Hornchurch on a one-month loan on 22 January 2024. Following his return to Sutton, he signed his first professional contract on 23 February. He made his first-team debut for Sutton in a 1–0 defeat away to Tranmere Rovers in League Two on 2 March 2024, coming on as a 39th-minute substitute. He returned to Hornchurch on loan on 26 March 2024, scoring a last-minute winner against Concord Rangers in his first match back. Taylor made nine appearances across the two loan spells, during which Hornchurch kept five clean sheets, before being recalled by Sutton on 22 April 2024.

After making 23 appearances during a loan spell at National League South club Hampton & Richmond Borough in the first part of the 2024–25 season, Taylor was recalled by Sutton in January 2025. He made 16 appearances in all competitions during the remainder of the season. During the first half of the 2025–26 season, he made 32 appearances and scored twice, including his first goal for Sutton in a 3–2 defeat to Scunthorpe United.

=== Stevenage ===
Taylor signed for League One club Stevenage for a five-figure fee on 28 January 2026. He made his debut in a 3–0 EFL Cup defeat to Reading on 25 August 2026.

He joined League Two club Exeter City on loan for the 2026–27 season on 1 September 2026.

== Style of play ==
Primarily a centre-back, Taylor has been described as "a versatile defender with intelligence, composure and aerial ability". He initially played as a winger in youth football, which he said helped develop his technical ability on the ball and contributed to his pace.

== Career statistics ==
As of match played 25 August 2026

Appearances and goals by club, season and competition
Club	Season	League			FA Cup		EFL Cup		Other		Total	
Club	Season	Division	Apps	Goals	Apps	Goals	Apps	Goals	Apps	Goals	Apps	Goals
Sutton United	2023–24	League Two	2	0	0	0	0	0	0	0	2	0
Sutton United	2024–25	National League	13	0	0	0	—		3 (Note: Appearances in National League Cup)	0	16	0
Sutton United	2025–26	National League	22	2	4	0	—		6 (Note: One appearance in FA Trophy; two appearances in Surrey Senior Cup; three appearances in National League Cup)	0	32	2
Sutton United	Total		37	2	4	0	0	0	9	0	50	2
Burgess Hill Town (loan)	2023–24	Isthmian League South East Division	19	1	4	0	—		3 (Note: One appearance in FA Trophy; one appearance in Alan Turvey Trophy; one appearance in Sussex Senior Cup)	0	26	1
Hornchurch (loan)	2023–24	Isthmian League Premier Division	9	1	—		—		0	0	9	1
Hampton & Richmond (loan)	2024–25	National League South	20	1	1	0	—		2 (Note: Appearances in FA Trophy)	0	23	1
Stevenage	2025–26	League One	0	0	—		—		—		0	0
Stevenage	2026–27	League One	0	0	0	0	1	0	0	0	1	0
Stevenage	Total		0	0	0	0	1	0	0	0	1	0
Exeter City (loan)	2026–27	League Two	0	0	0	0	—		0	0	0	0
Career total			85	5	9	0	1	0	14	0	109	5
