= Exeter City F.C. =

Association football club in England

Exeter City
- Full name: Exeter City Football Club
- Nickname: The Grecians
- Founded: 1901; 125 years ago
- Ground: St James Park
- Capacity: 8,720
- Owner: Exeter City Supporters' Trust
- Chairman: Wilf Walsh
- Manager: Matt Taylor
- League: EFL League Two
- 2025–26: EFL League One, 21st of 24 (relegated)
- Website: www.exetercityfc.co.uk
Home colours	Away colours	Third colours

Exeter City Football Club is a professional association football club based in Exeter, Devon, England. The club competes in EFL League Two, the fourth tier of English football, following relegation from the EFL League One in the 2025–26 season. Known as "the Grecians", the origin of their nickname is subject to speculation and debate. The club is owned by its supporters through the Exeter City Supporters' Trust.

Exeter City was founded in 1901 and began playing their games at St James Park, where they remain to this day. They joined Division One of the Southern League in 1904. After a tour of South America in 1914 to generate awareness of football in the continent, the club became the first side to play a national team from Brazil. As a result, City and Brazilian side Fluminense are now also partner clubs. Exeter were invited to help create the Football League Third Division in 1920. They were assigned to the Third Division South the next year and won the Third Division South Cup in 1934. They remained in the division until becoming founder members of the Fourth Division in 1958. They were promoted in 1963–64, only to be relegated after two seasons. They were promoted out of the Fourth Division again at the end of the 1976–77 season and managed to stay in the Third Division for seven seasons before being relegated in 1984.

Exeter won their first league title in the 1989–90 season, gaining promotion as Fourth Division champions under the stewardship of Terry Cooper. Relegated in 1994, they lost their Football League status at the end of the 2002–03 season. They spent five seasons in the Conference and recovered from defeat in the 2007 play-off final to win promotion out of the play-offs the next year. Manager Paul Tisdale built on this success by winning promotion out of League Two in 2008–09 and Exeter survived for three seasons in League One. Returning to League Two in 2012, they have lost in the play-off finals in 2017, 2018 and most recently in 2020, under Matt Taylor. At the end of the 2021–22 season they gained automatic promotion to League One but were relegated back to League Two after the 2025–26 season.

== History ==
=== Early history ===
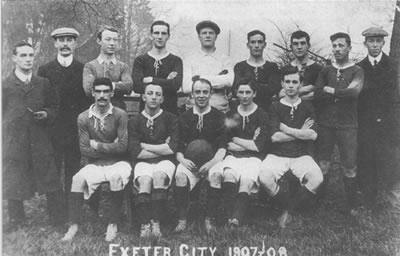
A team photo of Exeter City in 1907–08

Exeter City F.C. was formed from two predecessor clubs, Exeter United F.C. and St Sidwell's United. Exeter United was a football club from Exeter, Devon, that played between 1890 and 1904. In 1904, Exeter United lost 3–1 to local rivals St Sidwell's United and after the match it was agreed that the two clubs should become one. The new team took the name Exeter City and continued to play at Exeter United's ground, St James Park, where Exeter City still play today. Exeter United was formed from the cricket team of the same name and were one of the first football teams with the moniker "United". St Sidwell's United (which had also been known as St Sidwell's Wesleyans and St Sidwell's Old Boys) was a club that had formed from the regulars who frequented the Foresters Inn in Sidwell Street, Exeter, although the public house was always known as the Drum and Monkey. The team played in St Sidwell's old colours of green and white.

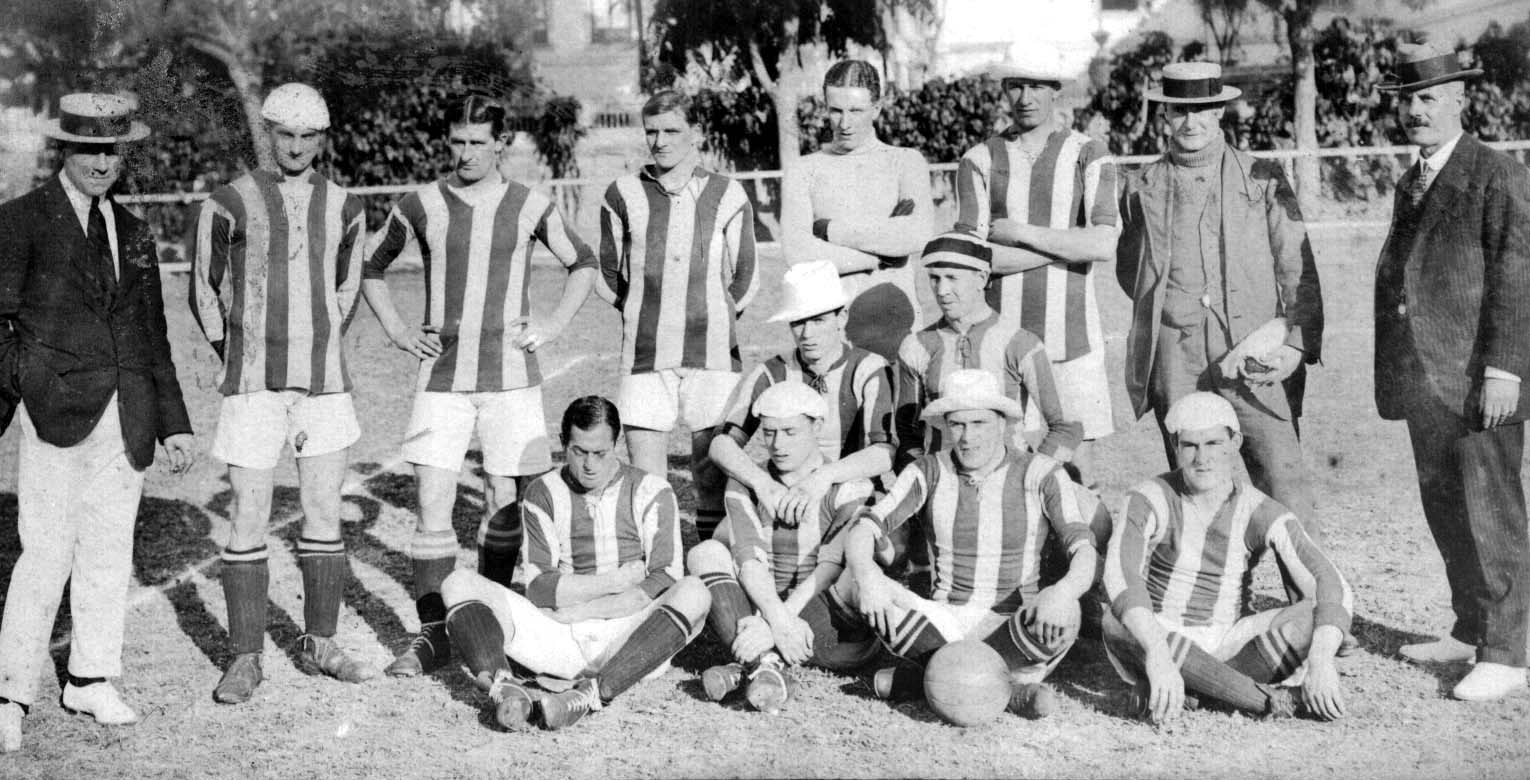
The team that played Brazil national team in 1914

On 10 September 1904, Exeter City played its first ever competitive match, a 2–1 victory at St James over 110th Battery of the Royal Artillery, in the East Devon League. The attendance was 600, and the winning goal scored by Sid Thomas, who was to serve the club in various capacities for seventy years. City topped the East Devon League with eleven wins, two draws and one defeat in its first season, and transferred to the Plymouth & District League for next three seasons. In 1908, Exeter City A.F.C. became a limited company. City became a full-time professional team, and applied successfully for membership of the Southern League, replacing Tottenham Hotspur.

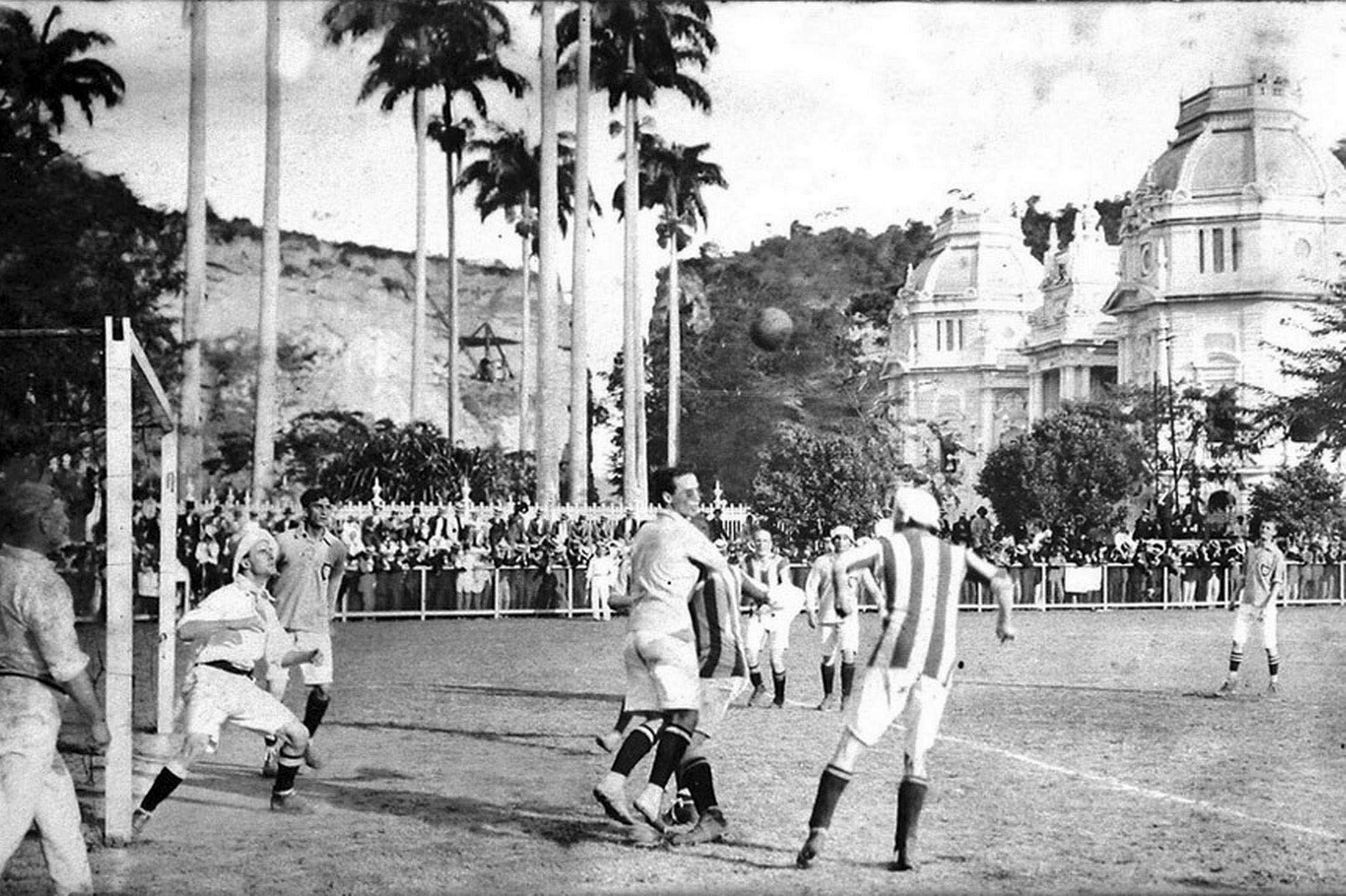
A match played by Exeter City in Rio de Janeiro during its South American tour of 1914

A wooden grandstand was erected, and the club entered into a leasing arrangement over the ground. On 3 October 1908, City recorded its record FA Cup win by beating Weymouth 14–0. The match was in the first qualifying round. James "Daisy" Bell scored six goals and ten of the goals came in the first half. City changed to its current colours of red and white in 1910. This was after having had a poor start to the season (only two wins out of eleven). City abandoned its supposedly unlucky green and white kit, and turned out for the first time in red and white striped shirts at home to West Ham United on 12 November. The result of the game was a 0–0 draw, but five consecutive league wins came for the club in December, and the change of colours stuck.

City made an historic tour of South America in 1914, during which time it played eight matches against teams of Argentina and Brazil. The last match on this tour on 21 July 1914 was an encounter with the first Brazil national football team playing under the authority of a national football association, in this case the Federação Brasileira de Sports, precursor of today's Confederação Brasileira de Futebol, founded just the month before. Brazil, featuring its first great star, Arthur Friedenreich, won this match at the Laranjeiras stadium, Rio de Janeiro, home of Fluminense Football Club with 2–0. The tour yielded five wins, one draw and two defeats. The only other loss was in a match that kicked off 12 hours after the players got off the boat. Exeter City were invited by the Football League to become founder members of the Third Division in 1920.

=== Football League (1920–2003) ===
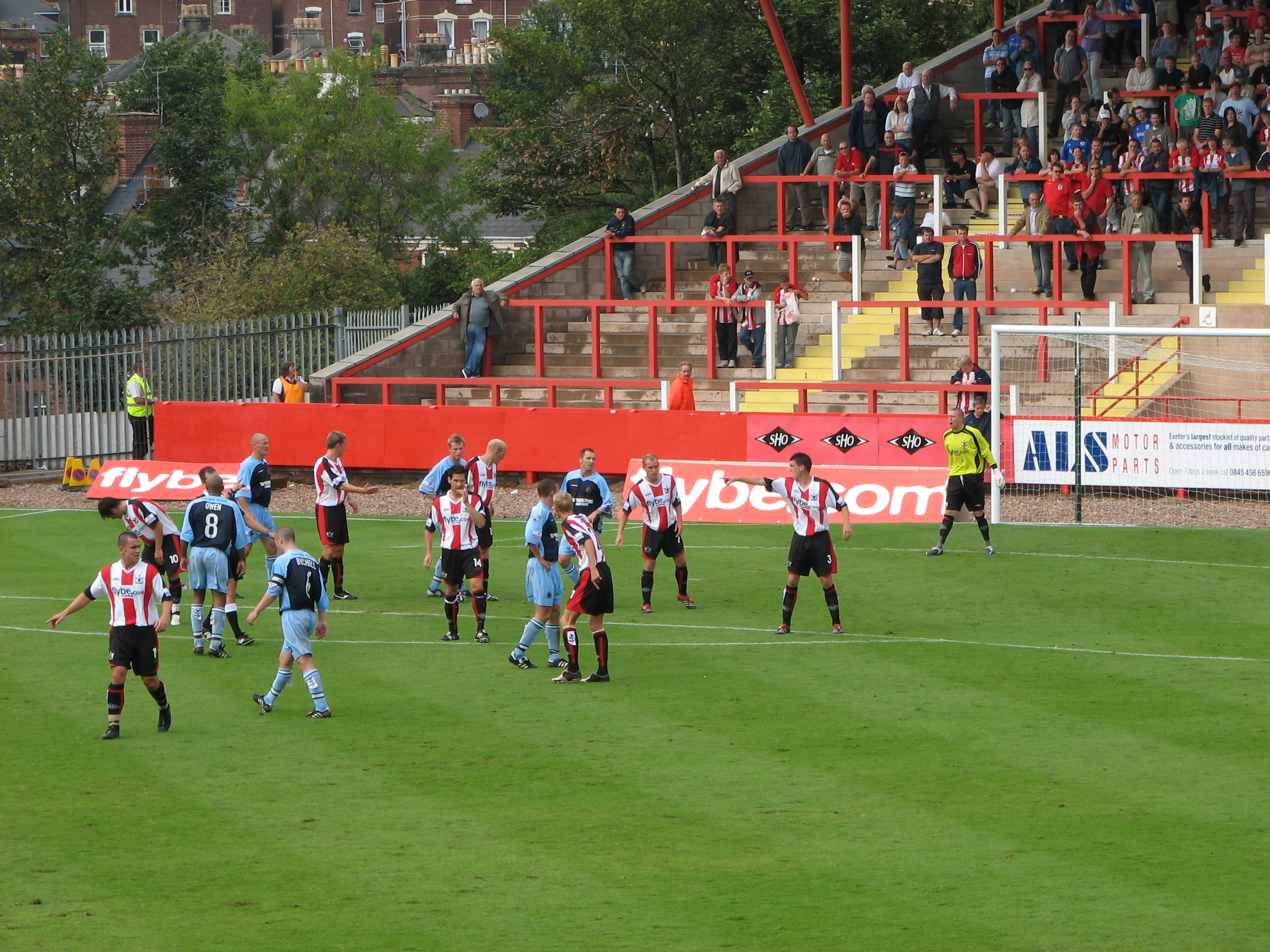
Exeter City vs Altrincham, a Conference National fixture played on 19 August 2006

City's historic first match in the Football League took place on Saturday 28 August 1920, when Brentford was the visiting team to St James Park. Exeter won 3–0. At the end of the season, the third tier of the League was being geographically divided, thus City was assigned to the Third Division South. In 1931, City reached the sixth round of the FA Cup, losing a replay 4–2 to Sunderland in front of its largest ever home gate. Fifty years later, City reached the sixth round again, but lost 2–0 to eventual winners Tottenham Hotspur. Earlier Exeter had beaten Newcastle United 4–0 having beaten Leicester City in the previous round.

In the 1932–33 season they achieved their highest position in the League, 2nd in the Third Division South, but remained there because at the time only the champions were promoted. It was the closest they ever came to promotion to the second tier of English football. In the 1963–64 season, City achieved their first ever promotion, going up to the Third Division. However, City were relegated just two seasons later. They would remain in the Third Division until 1977, when they achieved promotion under the guidance of Bobby Saxton.

The end of the 1970s and the early 1980s were regarded as City's most successful spell in the Third Division, including an 8th-place finish in 1979–80 and an FA Cup run the following season. Star players included Tony Kellow, John Delve and David Pullar. In 1990, the club won its first major trophy when they won the Fourth Division title. In that season, City won twenty league games at St James Park, and remained undefeated in 31 home matches, including dramatic draws against Norwich City in the FA Cup third round and Sunderland in the League Cup 4th round, both of which featured late equalisers for the visitors. Following that promotion, City rarely shone at the higher level. The departure of manager Terry Cooper and key players such as Shaun Taylor, Richard Dryden, Clive Whitehead, Brian McDermott and Steve Neville left new boss Alan Ball to pick up the pieces. There were some successes under the former World Cup winner — including winning both games against local rivals Plymouth in the clubs' first derbies for a decade in the 1992/93 season—but Ball left for Southampton in January 1994 and the returning Cooper was unable to save Exeter from relegation.

Back in the bottom division, City struggled for nearly a decade, with chairman Ivor Doble taking the club into administration and starting a chain of events that resulted in the sale of the club's ground. In November 1994, the club almost went out of business and sold its stadium to Beazer for £650,000, but were able to stay there after the local council took it over. After nearly two years on the brink of closure, the club came out of administration on 1 August 1996, although the problems on the field were far from over. In 2003, City finished 23rd in Division Three and was relegated to the Conference National; Exeter were the first club to suffer automatic relegation without finishing bottom of the league. City won their last game against Southend United 1–0, but were still relegated as Swansea City's victory over Hull City left the Grecians one point short of safety.

=== Conference era (2003–2008) ===

The starting line-up for the Conference Premier play-off final win against Cambridge United on 18 May 2008, resulting in promotion to the Football League.

Following relegation to the conference, the club was taken over by the Exeter City Supporters' Trust, purchasing a majority shareholding on 5 September 2003. In May 2007 two of the directors who had been in charge during season 2002–2003 were convicted of fraudulent trading at the club, John Russell receiving a prison sentence and Mike Lewis a community service sentence. Several million pounds in debt and with no big investor in sight, the Trust kept the club going through fundraising activities amongst rank-and-file supporters. Complex legal arguments with both the Inland Revenue and football authorities meant that City's first season of non-league football was plagued by off-the-field uncertainty. The claim was finally dropped in June 2004.

In 2004, a creditors voluntary arrangement (CVA) was put in place to reduce the club's debts. Through the club's "Red or Dead" scheme, hundreds of fans pledged at least £500 each to fund the CVA repayments, but the FA Cup proved to be the income boost the Grecians had needed, as City drew Manchester United away in the third round of the FA Cup. City drew 0–0 at Old Trafford in January 2005, gaining £653,511 as City's share of receipts from the 67,511 attendance. Further income from a televised replay — won 2–0 by United — coupled with ongoing fundraising and unpaid work from the club's supporters helped the club to repay its debts, and the CVA was cleared in December 2005.

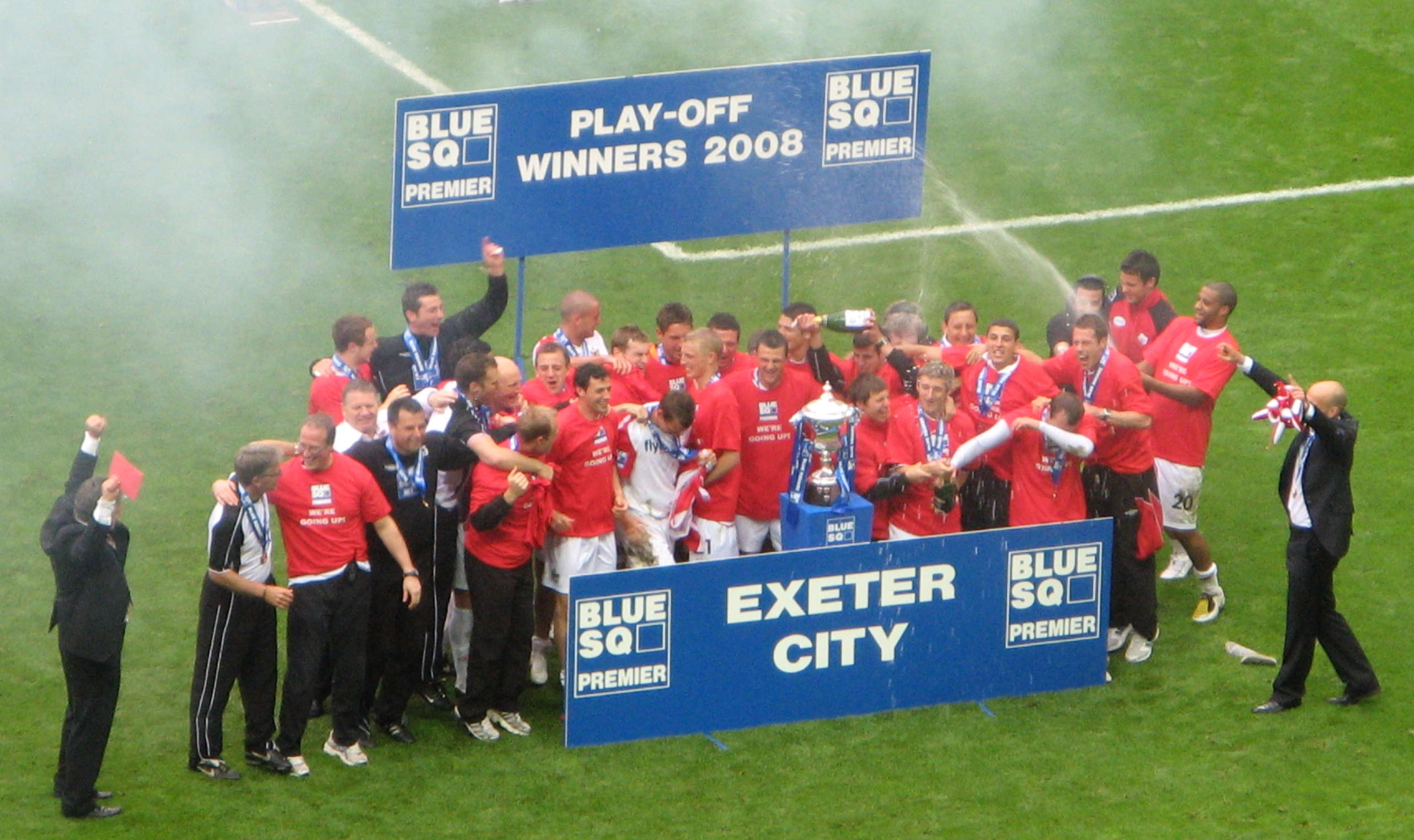
The Exeter team celebrates after the 2008 Conference National playoff final win.

2004 also saw the club's centenary. In May 2004 a friendly fixture was arranged against a Brazilian masters team at St James Park, a celebration of City's South American tour of 1914. The Brazilian team, containing such notable players as Careca and Dunga, won 1–0. City's first team finished the 2006–07 season in fifth place, qualifying for the play-offs. After beating Oxford United on penalties in the semi-final, City met Morecambe at Wembley in the final, where they lost 2–1 despite taking an early lead. Exeter reached the play-off final in the following season; this time Exeter looked to be heading out of the play-offs after losing the first leg of the semi-final at home to local rivals Torquay United 2–1, but came back to win the second leg 4–1 with three goals in the last 20 minutes. In the final Exeter met Cambridge United in front of a Conference play-off record crowd of 42,511, winning 1–0 with a goal from Rob Edwards, earning promotion to League Two.

=== Return to the Football League (2008–present) ===
Chart of yearly performance of Exeter City in the Football League

The club followed its success in the Conference by finishing as runners up to Brentford in League Two. A goal from Richard Logan helped Exeter to win promotion to League One with a 1–0 win away to Rotherham United on the last day of the season. 2009–10 was Exeter's 45th season in the third tier of English football. They have played more seasons in the third tier than any club who have never reached the top two tiers. They survived their first season at this level for sixteen years by one point; an 82nd-minute Ryan Harley goal against Huddersfield Town on the final day of the season saw Exeter overcome the promotion chasers 2–1 and relegated Gillingham in the process.

The club suffered a tragedy on 10 August 2010, days after the start of the 2010–11 season, when striker Adam Stansfield died of cancer aged 31. As a result, their next fixture against Dagenham & Redbridge on 14 August was postponed as a mark of respect. Exeter recovered well, however, and finished 8th in the league that season, one point off a playoff spot. Following such a strong season, hopes were high for the 2011–12 season, but poor away form (with just two wins away from home all season) saw Exeter relegated to League Two. Relegation was confirmed on 28 April 2012, following a 4–1 defeat away to Carlisle United.

The club remains owned by its fans, through the Exeter City Supporters Trust. During the 2012–13 season saw Exeter have a marginally successful season. Exeter set new club record for away wins in a single season, winning 11 of their 23 fixtures away from home, however, Exeter finished 10th. At the end of the 2012–13 campaign, poor funds and lack of income led to an unfortunate squad trim. In the following season, Exeter finished in 16th.

In pre-season, the club went on a short tour in Brazil to commemorate 100 years since they played the Brazil National Football Team. Exeter drew 0–0 against Fluminense under 23's and then beat sides Tupi and a Rio Cricket Club 2–1 and 3–1 respectively. In the 2014–15 FA Cup in the first round, they were beaten 1–0 away to Warrington Town, a club 100 places lower than them at that current point in the season. The Grecians finished tenth in League Two in 2014–15, their play-off push just falling short in the final few weeks. City finished in 14th position in 2015–16, a season that included a memorable 2–2 draw against Premier League Liverpool in the FA Cup.

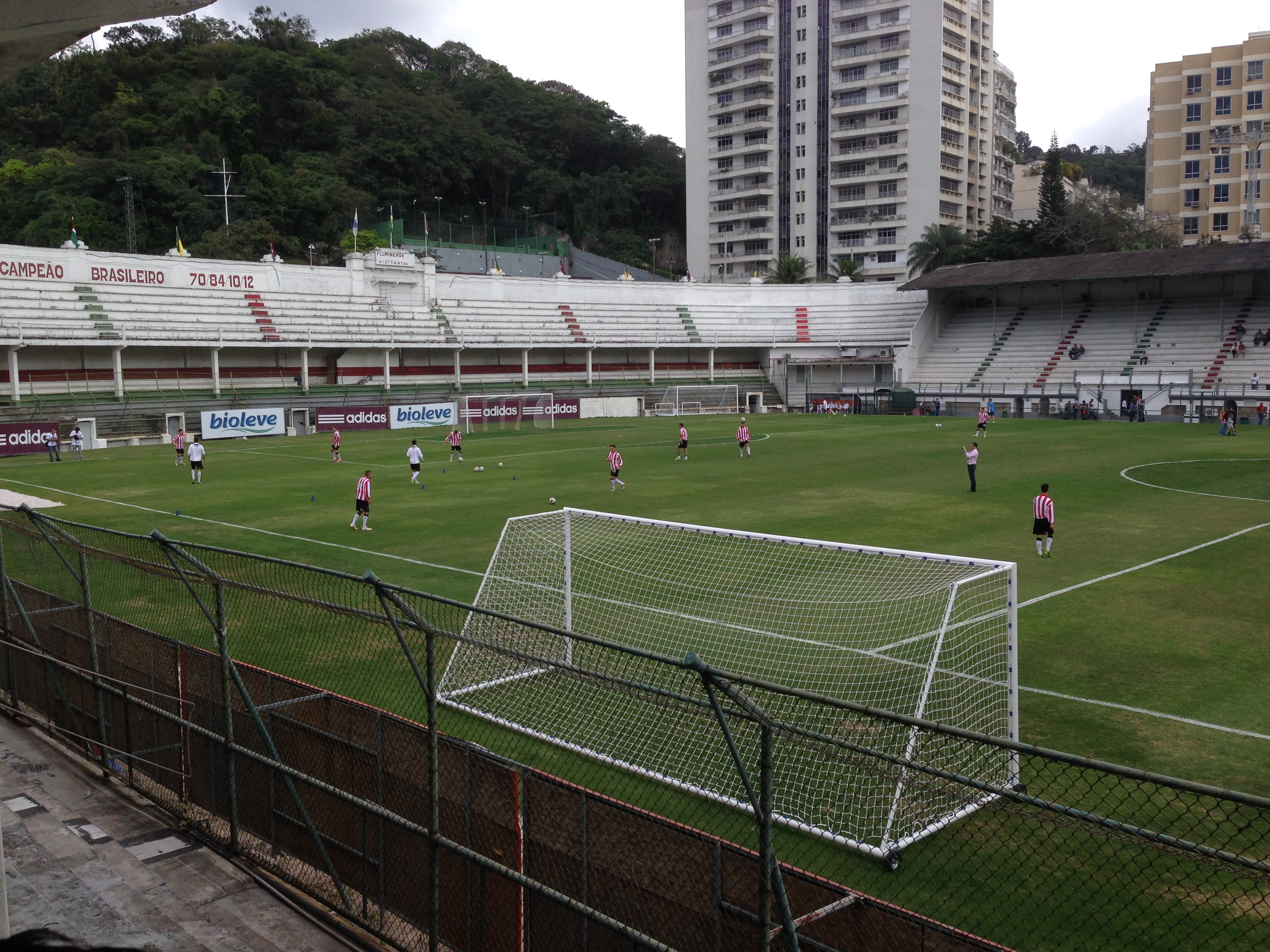
Exeter City warming up at Estádio das Laranjeiras ahead of their pre-season friendly against Fluminense U23s in 2014

In the 2016–17 season, City started badly, and were bottom of the league by November. However, a turnaround in form saw Exeter finish 5th in the league, and earn a play-off spot. Following a thrilling 3–3 draw in the first leg of the semi-final at Carlisle, the second leg, tied at 2–2, looked destined to go to extra time. But, in the 95th minute, Jack Stacey's long range shot with his weak foot fired Exeter into the final, earning them a spot at Wembley. The final took place on 28 May, and Exeter faced Blackpool. Their hopes for promotion were shattered when they conceded a goal within 3 minutes, and although they equalised, City eventually lost the game 2–1.

In the 2017–18 season, they reached the play-off final, again being on the losing side, this time against Coventry. On 1 June 2018, Exeter announced that, after 12 years as manager, Paul Tisdale had decided not to sign a new contract with the club, which announced that Matt Taylor, a former captain and Under 23 team coach, had been appointed manager. On 26 April 2022, Exeter gained promotion to the EFL League One following a 2–1 win over Barrow at St James Park and went onto finish the 2021–22 EFL League Two season in second place.

== Nickname ==
The club is nicknamed The Grecians, the origin of which remains the subject of much speculation. One suggestion is that in 1908 the club voted for the name because of its association with St Sidwells parish. Historically people living in the parish of St Sidwells were said to have been known as "Greeks" or "Grecians". This is possibly due to the parish's location beyond the city walls. For instance, in Homer's epic poem the Iliad the Greek forces laid siege to the walls of Troy. However, perhaps more plausibly, the association arose because of rivalries between city boys and those of St Sidwells during the annual beating the bounds.

It has also been suggested the name derived from a group of children in St Sidwells who were referred to as the 'Greasy Un's'. A further possibility was that it derived from a jeweller's shop in Sidwell Street, close to the ground, which had a clock hanging outside displaying the name 'Grecians' on its face. Yet another theory suggests that it is a corruption of Caerwysg, the Welsh name for Exeter (Caer = fort, Wysg = Exe – fort on the river Exe, similar to the Cornish Karesk). Thus, citizens could have been known as Caer Iscuns and so possibly mutating to Grecians.

== Supporters and rivalries ==
=== Famous fans ===
Famous fans include David Earl, Coldplay frontman Chris Martin, Adrian Edmondson, Noel Edmonds, swimmer Liam Tancock, BBC broadcaster James Vickery, Spotlight reporter John Ayres, TV presenter Juliet Morris and Hoosiers drummer Alan Sharland. Singer Joss Stone signed up as a member of the supporters trust, being introduced to fans on the pitch as a new member during a League Cup match against Liverpool.

In 2002 pop singer Michael Jackson was made honorary director of Exeter City. He visited St James Park with celebrity friend Uri Geller, who was also a director. The crew of HMS Defender (D36) also adopted Exeter City as their home team and use their strip when playing games.

=== Rivalries ===
A survey conducted by Football Fans Census in 2003 revealed that Exeter City supporters consider their main rival to be Plymouth Argyle. The two clubs first met in a competitive fixture in 1908 when both sides were in the Southern League, and have contested matches intermittently during their histories due to Plymouth Argyle usually being in a higher division. Supporters also share a friendlier rivalry with Torquay United, a club whose supporters view Exeter as their main rival. The two clubs are closer geographically and have met more often during their respective histories, having first played a competitive match in 1927 after Torquay were elected to the Football League. Matches between the three clubs are known as Devon derbies. Despite their on-field rivalry, Torquay helped Exeter during their financial difficulties of 2003 by waiving their gate receipts in a pre-season friendly. This gesture was returned in 2015 when Exeter gave the Gulls their gate receipts as a result of Torquay's financial difficulties, having had to close down their academy and terminate the contract of manager Chris Hargreaves.

== Players ==
=== Current squad ===
As of 3 October 2026

Note: Flags indicate national team as defined under FIFA eligibility rules; some limited exceptions apply. Players may hold more than one non-FIFA nationality.

No.	Pos.	Nation	Player
1	GK	ENG	Jack Bycroft
2	DF	ENG	Lakyle Samuel (on loan from Manchester City)
3	DF	ENG	Luca Woodhouse
4	DF	WAL	Ed Turns
5	DF	ENG	Jack Fitzwater (captain)
6	DF	ENG	Jack Taylor (on loan from Stevenage)
7	MF	WAL	Gwion Edwards
8	MF	ENG	Taylor Perry
10	FW	ENG	Josh Gordon
11	FW	ENG	Andrew Oluwabori
12	MF	ENG	Reece Cole
14	MF	ENG	Harry Kite
15	FW	ENG	Ajay Matthews (on loan from Millwall)
16	MF	IRL	Charlie Cummins
17	MF	ENG	Tom Dean

No.	Pos.	Nation	Player
18	MF	ENG	Liam Oakes
19	FW	ENG	Sonny Cox
20	MF	ENG	George Birch
21	MF	WAL	Daniel Watts (on loan from Swansea City)
22	GK	ENG	Frankie Phillips
23	DF	SCO	Ethan Sutherland (on loan from Wolverhampton Wanderers)
24	DF	KEN	Vincent Harper (on loan from Walsall)
25	FW	IRL	Anthony Scully
31	MF	IRL	Jake Doyle-Hayes (vice-captain)
32	FW	ENG	Danny Rose
40	DF	WAL	Ed James
41	MF	POR	Pedro Elawar
46	MF	ENG	Louie Cayless
47	DF	ENG	Liam Cartwright

=== Retired numbers ===
Following Adam Stansfield's death from colorectal cancer during the 2010–11 season, the club retired his number 9 shirt for the following nine seasons. From the 2020–21 season onwards, the shirt number is worn only by players from the club's own academy. On 2 September 2022, it was announced that Stansfield's son Jay Stansfield would return to Exeter City on a season-long loan basis, thus following in the footsteps of his late father by wearing the number 9 shirt.

=== Notable former players ===
Notable former players include Harry Gee, who during the 1927–28 season made 29 appearances for the club and scored two goals. He retired from professional after just one season at the club suffering a career ending broken leg, Gee had formerly played for Burnley. Cliff Bastin, who went on to play for Arsenal and England, Maurice Setters, who won an FA Cup winner's medal with Manchester United in 1963, and goalkeeper Dick Pym, who later played for Bolton Wanderers and England. Pym's sale to Bolton in 1921, for a fee of £5,000, allowed City to purchase St. James Park.

Other well-known players include the prolific 1930s striker Fred Whitlow, Arnold Mitchell, who played 495 games for City, Tony Kellow, City's record goalscorer, Ian Main, the gifted goalkeeper from the club's most successful years who died very young, Fred Binney and Darran Rowbotham in the 1980s and early 1990s. Former England winger Lee Sharpe played four games for Exeter at the beginning of their 2002–03 Division Three campaign, scoring two goals. Former City player George Reader went on to referee the 1950 World Cup final, becoming the first Englishman to do so.

David Pleat scored 14 goals for Exeter whilst playing for them between 1968 and 1970. He went on to manage several successful clubs, including Tottenham Hotspur, before becoming a football media pundit for ITV and BBC Radio 5 Live. In recent times, Exeter City Academy graduates Dean Moxey, George Friend, Matt Grimes, Ethan Ampadu and Ollie Watkins have gone on to play in the Premier League, while Danny Seaborne and Elliott Frear established themselves as regulars in the Scottish Premier League. Ampadu (son of former Arsenal and Exeter City player Kwame Ampadu) won his first Wales cap in 2017, and played for his country at UEFA Euro 2020. Watkins, meanwhile, who while at the club was named 2017 EFL Young Player of the Season and left Exeter for a 'club record fee', won his first England cap in 2021. Jamie Mackie, who played for Exeter between 2005 and 2008, went on to play 60 Premier League games for QPR, and made nine appearances for Scotland. In a survey published by the Professional Footballers' Association in December 2007, Alan Banks was listed as the all-time favourite player amongst Exeter City fans.

==== Hall of Fame ====
In 2014 Exeter City – in partnership with the Exeter College, the Heritage Lottery Fund, the South West Heritage Trust and the ECFCST History Group – launched the Hall of Fame. The Hall of Fame aims to recognise the achievements and contributions made by 'genuine legends' to the club.

The following players have been inducted into the Hall of Fame:

Inducted	Name	Nationality	Position	Playing career	League		Ref
Inducted	Name	Nationality	Position	Playing career	Apps	Goals	Ref
2014	Alan Banks	(England)	FW	1963–66, 1967–73	258	101	
2014	Cliff Bastin	(England)	FW	1928–29	17	6	
2014	Reg Clarke	(England)	MF	1927–37	315	18	
2014	Dermot Curtis	(Republic of Ireland)	FW	1963–66, 1967–69	157	33	
2014	Jimmy Giles	(England)	DF	1971–75, 1977–81	313	13	
2014	Tony Kellow	(England)	FW	1976–78, 1980–84, 1985–88	332	129	
2014	Arnold Mitchell	(England)	MF	1952–66	495	44	
2014	Dick Pym	(England)	GK	1911–21	203	0	
2017	Peter Hatch	(England)	DF	1973–82	346	18	
2017	Graham Rees	(Wales)	FW	1954–66	345	85	
2017	Adam Stansfield	(England)	FW	2006–10	158	39	
2017	Sid Thomas	(England)	FW	1904–08	38	16	

== Non-playing staff ==
As of 2 November 2024

=== Corporate hierarchy ===
Position	Name
Club President, Associate Director of External Affairs	Julian Tagg
Exeter City Supporters' Trust and Club Board Chairman	Wilf Walsh
Exeter City Supporters' Trust Vice Chairman	Laurence Overend
Chief Executive Officer	Matt Roach
General Manager	John Street (interim)
Director	Julen Beer
Director	Tony Badcott
Director	Andrew Rothwell
Director	Gary Quick
Director	David Lee
Director	Laurence Overend
Company Secretary	John Street

=== Coaching staff ===
Position	Name
Head coach	(England) Matt Taylor
Assistant Head Coach	(England) Kevin Nicholson
Assistant Head Coach	(England) Dan Green
Goalkeeping Coach	(England) Alistair Hines
Head of Performance Analysis	(England) Vacant
First-Team Analyst	(England) Alex Mitchell
Club Doctor	(England) Dr. Peter Riou
Head Physiotherapist	(England) Nathan Clinch
First-Team Physiotherapist	(England) Will Huyton
Strength and Conditioning Coach	(England) Tom Yates
Kit Room Lead	(England) Sue Matthews
Matchday Kit Co-Ordinator	(England) Keith Stone
Technical Director	(England) Marcus Flitcroft
Chief Scout	(England) Malcolm Crosby
Scout	(England) Mark Flay
Club Secretary	(England) Andy Gillard

=== Managerial history ===
As of 8 September 2026

Name	From	Until	Played	Won	Drawn	Lost	Win %	Honours / Notes
Unknown	1904	1908	—	—	—	—	—	
(England) Arthur Chadwick	1 April 1908	31 December 1922	113	31	32	50	27.43%	
(England) Fred Mavin	1 January 1923	1 November 1927	209	76	41	92	36.36%	
(Scotland) Dave Wilson	1 March 1928	1 February 1929	42	11	10	21	26.19%	
(Northern Ireland) Billy McDevitt	1 February 1929	30 September 1935	295	117	66	112	39.66%	
(England) Jack English	1 October 1935	31 May 1939	168	48	48	72	28.57%	
(England) George Roughton	1 August 1945	1 March 1952	270	99	55	116	36.67%	
(England) Norman Kirkman	1 March 1952	31 March 1953	52	14	16	22	26.92%	
(England) Tim Ward	1953	1953	—	—	—	—	—	
(England) Norman Dodgin	1 April 1953	30 April 1957	199	62	50	87	31.16%	
(Scotland) Bill Thompson	1 May 1957	1 January 1958	28	7	5	16	25%	
(England) Frank Broome	1 January 1958	31 May 1960	116	48	26	42	41.38%	
(England) Glen Wilson	1 June 1960	30 April 1962	97	27	24	46	27.84%	
(England) Cyril Spiers	1 May 1962	1 February 1963	28	7	4	17	25%	
(Wales) Jack Edwards	1 February 1963	31 January 1965	102	41	33	28	40.19%	
(England) Ellis Stuttard	1 February 1965	1 June 1966	66	16	19	31	24.24%	
(England) Jack Basford	1 June 1966	30 April 1967	50	15	16	19	30%	
(England) Frank Broome	1 May 1967	1 February 1969	91	23	31	37	25.27%	Second tenure
(England) Johnny Newman	1 April 1969	21 December 1976	377	138	98	141	36.6%	
(England) Bobby Saxton	1 January 1977	5 January 1979	109	45	33	31	41.28%	
(Wales) Brian Godfrey	1 January 1979	1 June 1983	240	88	57	95	36.67%	
(England) Gerry Francis	20 July 1983	14 May 1984	50	6	16	28	12%	
(England) Jim Iley	7 June 1984	30 April 1985	47	13	14	20	27.66%	
(England) Colin Appleton	1 May 1985	11 December 1987	128	35	46	47	27.34%	
(England) John Delve	11 December 1987	8 May 1988	27	4	9	14	14.81%	
(England) Terry Cooper	9 May 1988	1 August 1991	157	67	26	64	42.68%	Fourth Division Champions: 1989–90
(England) Alan Ball	6 August 1991	20 January 1994	135	36	43	56	26.67%	
(England) Terry Cooper	24 January 1994	31 July 1995	69	14	16	39	20.29%	Second tenure
(England) Peter Fox	1 August 1995	9 January 2000	235	69	70	96	29.36%	
(England) Noel Blake	10 January 2000	24 September 2001	86	20	24	42	23.26%	
(Wales) John Cornforth	24 September 2001	6 October 2002	54	17	14	23	31.48%	
(Republic of Ireland) Eamonn Dolan	6 October 2002	17 October 2002	1	0	1	0	0%	Caretaker Manager
(Scotland) Neil McNab	17 October 2002	25 February 2003	26	6	8	12	23.08%	
(England) Gary Peters	25 February 2003	24 May 2003	13	5	5	3	38.46%	
(Republic of Ireland) Eamonn Dolan	9 June 2003	7 October 2004	62	26	19	17	41.94%	
(England) Steve Perryman (England) Scott Hiley	7 October 2004	18 October 2004	2	0	2	0	0%	Joint Caretaker Managers
(England) Alex Inglethorpe	18 October 2004	25 June 2006	89	44	16	29	49.44%	FA Trophy Semi-finalists: 2005–06
(England) Paul Tisdale	26 June 2006	1 June 2018	626	241	159	226	38.50%	Conference National Play-off Finalists: 2006–07; Conference National Play-off Winners: 2007–08; League Two Runners-up: 2008–09; League Two Manager of the Year: 2009; Football League Trophy Area Finalists: 2010–11; League Two Play-off Finalists: 2016–17, 2017–18
(England) Matt Taylor	1 June 2018	4 October 2022	227	100	67	60	44.05%	League Two Play-off Finalists: 2019–20; League Two Runners-up: 2021–22
(England) Kevin Nicholson (England) Jon Hill	4 October 2022	24 October 2022	6	3	0	3	50%	Joint Caretaker Managers
(Scotland) Gary Caldwell	24 October 2022	14 February 2026	142	51	32	59	35.92%	
(England) Dan Green	16 February 2026	28 February 2026	3	0	2	1	0%	Caretaker manager
(England) Matt Taylor	1 March 2026	Present	19	2	7	10	10.5%	Second stint at the club

== Chairmen ==
The following have been chairman of the club:

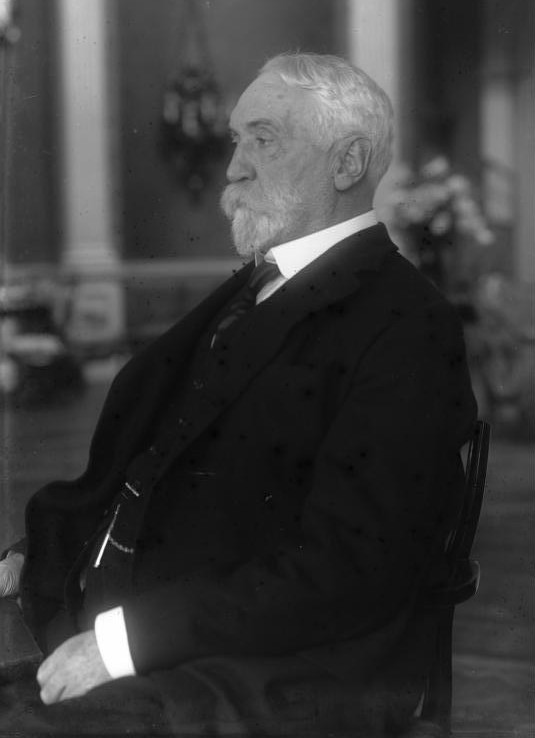
The Conservative Member of parliament for Exeter, Edgar Vincent, 1st Viscount D'Abernon, was the second chairman of the club

Period	Name
1904–05	C Fey
1905–06	Edgar Vincent, 1st Viscount D'Abernon
1906–08	William Fenwick
1907	F H Gardner
1908–10	Captain F J Harvey
1910–36	Michael J. McGahey
1936–42	Colonel Frederick Joseph Collymore Hunter
1945–1957	Sidney H Thomas
1957–1959	Albert Stanley Line
1959–1961	George Gillin
1961–67	Reg Rose
1967–70	Leslie Kerslake
1970–74	Fred Dart
1974–82	Gerald Vallance
1982–1985	Clifford Hill
1985	Byron Snell
1985–2002	Ivor Doble
2002–03	John Lewis †
2002–03	Uri Geller † (Note: Geller was formally elected as co-chairman with Russell at a board meeting on 21 May 2002. However, he was never officially registered, even as a director.)
2003–06	David Treharne
2006–10	Denise Watts
2010-14	Edward Chorlton
2014–2020	Julian Tagg
2020–2021	Richard Pym
2021–2025	Nick Hawker
2025	Clive Harrison (interim)
2025	Richard Pym
2026	Laurence Overend (interim)
2026–	Wilf Walsh

† Indicates spell as co-chairman

== Honours ==
League

- Fourth Division / League Two (level 4)
  - Champions: 1989–90
  - Runners-up: 1976–77, 2008–09, 2021–22
  - Promoted: 1963–64
- Conference (level 5)
  - Play-off winners: 2008

Cup

- Third Division South Cup
  - Winners: 1933–34
- Devon St. Luke's Challenge Cup
  - Winners (22): 1925–26, 1926–27, 1927–28, 1953–54, 1958–59, 1960–61, 1961–62, 1962–63, 1963–64, 1964–65, 1967–68, 1973–74, 1984–85, 1985–86, 1986–87, 1996–97, 1997–98, 2001–02, 2003–04, 2004–05, 2008–09, 2018–19.
- East Devon Senior Cup
  - Winners: 1953–54, 1980–81, 1981–82
- Trowbridge Charity Cup
  - Winners: 1927–28
- Hospital Cup
  - Winners: 1969–70
- Bill Slee Cup
  - Winners: 1985–86
- Brian Lomax Supporters Direct Cup
  - Winners: 2017–18

=== Club records ===
- Largest league victory
  - 8–1 v. Coventry City, 1926
  - 8–1 v. Aldershot, 1935 (the score at half-time was 0–0).
- Largest FA Cup victory – 14–0 v. Weymouth, 1908.
- Largest aggregate score - 11–6 v Crystal Palace, Third Division South Cup 1933–34.
- Largest league defeat
  - 0–9 vs. Notts County, 1948
  - 0–9 vs. Northampton Town, 1958.
- Largest cup defeat
  - 0–9 vs. Reading, 2023.
  - 1–10 vs. Manchester City, 2026.
- Record home attendance – 20,984 vs. Sunderland, FA Cup sixth round replay, 1931.
- Record away attendance – 67,551 vs. Manchester United at Old Trafford, FA Cup third round, 2005.
- Most away victories in a single league season – 13 victories (from 23 matches) in 2016/17.
- Furthest round in the FA Cup
  - Quarter-finalists: 1930–31, 1980–81.
- Furthest round in the EFL Trophy
  - Area finalists (3): 1992–93, 1999–2000, 2010–11.
- Furthest round in the FA Trophy
  - Semi-finalists: 2005–06.
- Highest ever league position:
  - Runners-up: Third Division South / League One (Tier 3) – 1932–33.

== See also ==
- Exeter City Supporters' Trust
- Exeter City Women F.C.
- List of fan-owned sports teams
