= Charlie Cummins =

Irish footballer (born 2005)

Personal information
- Full name: Charlie James Cummins
- Date of birth: 13 June 2005 (age 21)
- Place of birth: Blarney, County Cork, Ireland
- Height: 1.88 m (6 ft 2 in)
- Positions: Midfielder; defender

Team information
- Current team: Exeter City
- Number: 16

Youth career
- Blarney United
- 2020–2023: Cobh Ramblers

Senior career*
Years	Team	Apps	(Gls)
2023	Cobh Ramblers	1	(0)
2024–	Exeter City	28	(1)
2024	→ Mousehole (loan)	11	(1)
2024	→ Poole Town (loan)	3	(0)
2024	→ Taunton Town (loan)	5	(1)
2025	→ Tiverton Town (loan)	17	(1)
2025–2026	→ Weston-super-Mare (loan)	16	(2)
- * Club domestic league appearances and goals as of 14:25, 22 November 2026 (UTC)

Charlie James Cummins (born 13 June 2005) is an Irish professional footballer who plays for Exeter City, as a midfielder and defender.

== Club career ==
After playing for Blarney United and Cobh Ramblers, Cummins signed for Exeter City in January 2024. He moved on loan to Mousehole in March 2024, on loan to Poole Town in September 2024, and on loan to Taunton Town in November 2024. In January 2025 he signed on loan for Tiverton Town. In October 2025 he moved on loan to Weston-super-Mare, and in February 2026 the loan was extended to the end of the season, before being recalled by Exeter later that month. Upon his return to the club he broke into the first-team, being commended in the media for his performances. In April 2026 he was praised by Exeter manager Matt Taylor, and later that month his contract with Exeter was extended by a year.

== International career ==
In November 2026, Cummins was called-up to the Republic of Ireland U21 squad for the first time, replacing the injured Ike Orazi in the squad for their 2027 UEFA European Under-21 Championship qualification play-offs against Finland U21.

== Playing style ==
Cummins played for Exeter in both midfield and defence.
