= 2025–26 FA Cup =

Football Association Challenge Cup
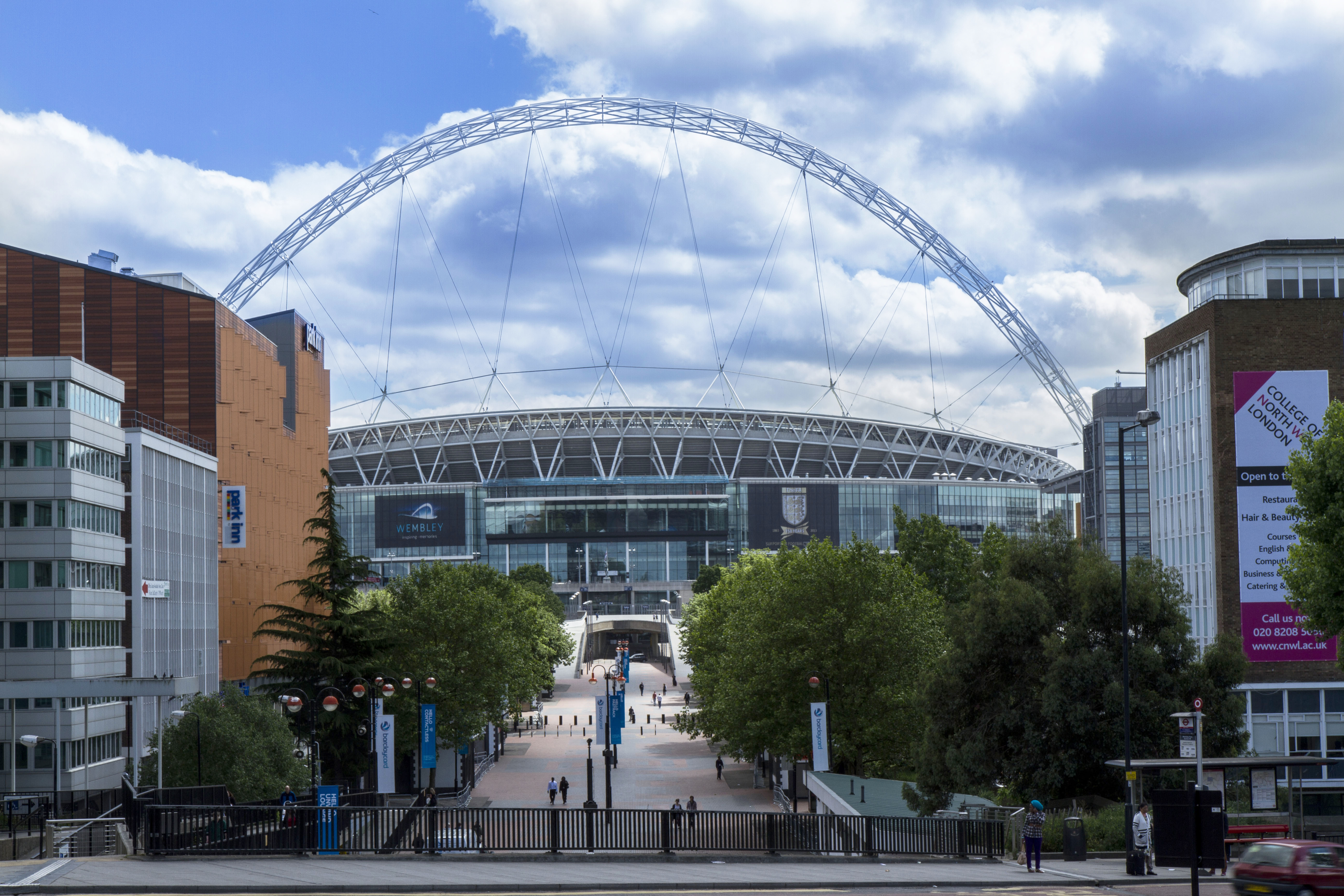
- Wembley Stadium hosted the final.

Tournament details
- Country: England; Wales
- Dates: 31 October 2025 – 16 May 2026
- Teams: 747; 655 (qualifying competition); 124 (main competition incl. 32 qualifiers)

Final positions
- Champions: Manchester City (8th title)
- Runners-up: Chelsea

Tournament statistics
- Matches played: 122
- Goals scored: 422 (3.46 per match)
- Attendance: 1,842,926 (15,106 per match)
- Top goal scorer: Tyrese Shade (5 goals)
- (Note: All statistics do not include qualifying competition)

The 2025–26 FA Cup was the 145th season of the Football Association Challenge Cup, the oldest football tournament in the world. It is sponsored by Emirates and known as the Emirates FA Cup for sponsorship reasons. The FA Cup is the main domestic cup competition for men's football teams in England. The qualifying competition began on 1 August 2025, with the tournament proper starting on 31 October 2025. The final was played at Wembley Stadium, London, on 16 May 2026.

Defending champions Crystal Palace, having beaten Manchester City in the 2025 final to win their first ever title, were eliminated in the third round after an upset victory by sixth-tier National League North side Macclesfield.

Manchester City, the previous year's finalists, won their 8th FA Cup, defeating Premier League side Chelsea in what was their fourth consecutive FA Cup Final.

== Teams, dates and regulations ==
Teams in each round.

The FA Cup is a knockout competition with 124 teams taking part from the first round proper, and all trying to reach the final at Wembley Stadium on 16 May 2026. The competition consists of the 92 teams from the Football League system (20 teams from the Premier League and the 72 in total from the EFL Championship, EFL League One and EFL League Two) plus the 32 surviving teams out of 655 teams from the National League System that started the competition in the qualifying rounds. The total 747 entrants was an increase of 2 from the previous season, and the most since 758 entrants were accepted in 2012–13.

Round	Main date (Saturdays)	Number of fixtures	Clubs remaining	New entries this round	Winner prize money	Loser prize money	Divisions entering this round
First round	1 November 2025	40	124 → 84	48	£47,750	£15,800	24 EFL League One teams 24 EFL League Two teams
Second round	6 December 2025	20	84 → 64	None	£79,500	£21,200	None
Third round	10 January 2026	32	64 → 32	44	£121,500	£26,500	20 Premier League teams 24 EFL Championship teams
Fourth round	14 February 2026	16	32 → 16	None	£127,000	None	None
Fifth round	7 March 2026	8	16 → 8	None	£238,500	None	None
Quarter-finals	4 April 2026	4	8 → 4	None	£477,000	None	None
Semi-finals	25 April 2026	2	4 → 2	None	£1,060,000	£530,000	None
Final	16 May 2026	1	2 → 1	None	£2,120,000	£1,060,000	None

== Rule changes ==
This is the second consecutive (and third overall) edition of the tournament to be played without replays in the proper rounds since 2020–21, following a six-year agreement beginning in 2024–25 between the FA and the Premier League, and the second consecutive edition of the tournament to have the final played one week before the end of the Premier League season.

== Qualifying ==
Teams that are not members of either the Premier League or English Football League compete in the qualifying rounds to secure one of 32 available places in the first round. The six-round qualifying competition began with the extra preliminary round on 2 August 2025, with the fourth and final qualifying round kicking off on 11 October.

The winners from the fourth qualifying round were AFC Telford United, AFC Totton, Aldershot Town, Altrincham, Boreham Wood, Brackley Town, Braintree Town, Buxton, Carlisle United, Chatham Town, Chelmsford City, Chester, Eastleigh, Ebbsfleet United, Forest Green Rovers, Gainsborough Trinity, Gateshead, Halifax Town, Hemel Hempstead Town, Macclesfield, Maldon & Tiptree, Scunthorpe United, Slough Town, South Shields, Southend United, Spennymoor Town, St Albans City, Sutton United, Tamworth, Wealdstone, Weston-super-Mare and York City.

Phoenix club Macclesfield were the only debutants in the first round, appearing in the competition proper for the first time in their own right only five years after the liquidation of predecessor outfit Macclesfield Town, with Town having last featured in the first round of the FA Cup in 2017–18. Hemel Hempstead Town, South Shields and Spennymoor Town all matched their best ever runs by reaching the competition proper, while Chatham Town featured in the FA Cup for the first time in 97 years.

== First round ==
A total of 80 teams played in the first round: 32 winners from the fourth qualifying round, 24 from League Two (tier 4), and 24 from League One (tier 3). Eighth tier side Maldon & Tiptree (Isthmian League North Division) were the lowest-ranked team in the draw.

The draw was made on 13 October 2025 by Joel Ward and Michail Antonio and took place at Woodside Road, Worthing, prior to the fourth qualifying round tie between Worthing and Forest Green Rovers.

Number of teams per tier still in competition
Premier League (Note: Premier League and Championship teams joined the competition in the third round.)	Championship	League One	League Two	Non-League	Total
20 / 20	24 / 24	24 / 24	24 / 24	32 / 32	124 / 124

31 October 2025	Luton Town (3)	4–3	Forest Green Rovers (5)	Luton
19:30 GMT	Fanne 23'; Wells 30', 53'; Kodua 90+2'	Report	Knowles 61'; McAllister 68' (pen.); Dausch 79'	Stadium: Kenilworth Road; Attendance: 4,511; Referee: Stephen Parkinson

1 November 2025	Chelmsford City (6)	4–1	Braintree Town (5)	Chelmsford
12:00 GMT	Adigun 19'; Taylor 28', 50'; Uchegbulam 42'	Report	Akinde 37' (pen.)	Stadium: Melbourne Stadium; Attendance: 3,502; Referee: Matthew Russell

1 November 2025	AFC Wimbledon (3)	0–2	Gateshead (5)	Wimbledon
15:00 GMT		Report	Adom 21'; John 51'	Stadium: Plough Lane; Attendance: 5,321; Referee: Aaron Farmer

1 November 2025	Barnsley (3)	3–2	York City (5)	Barnsley
15:00 GMT	Keillor-Dunn 30', 77'; Roberts 90+1'	Report	Stones 23'; Kitching 87'	Stadium: Oakwell; Attendance: 5,953; Referee: Michael Barlow

1 November 2025	Blackpool (3)	1–0	Scunthorpe United (5)	Blackpool
15:00 GMT	Fletcher 17'	Report		Stadium: Bloomfield Road; Attendance: 4,503; Referee: Elliot Bell

1 November 2025	Bolton Wanderers (3)	2–1	Huddersfield Town (3)	Bolton
15:00 GMT	Cissoko 41'; Taylor 69'	Report	Radulović 63'	Stadium: Toughsheet Community Stadium; Attendance: 6,077; Referee: Ross Joyce

1 November 2025	Boreham Wood (5)	3–0	Crawley Town (4)	Borehamwood
15:00 GMT	Rush 9'; Brunt 15' (pen.); Abdulmalik 72'	Report		Stadium: Meadow Park; Attendance: 1,536; Referee: Sam Mulhall

1 November 2025	Bromley (4)	1–2	Bristol Rovers (4)	Bromley
15:00 GMT	Umolu 83'	Report	Cavegn 76'; Cotterill 79'	Stadium: Hayes Lane; Attendance: 2,500; Referee: Isaac Searle

1 November 2025	Burton Albion (3)	6–0	St Albans City (7)	Burton upon Trent
15:00 GMT	Shade 1', 80'; Webster 47', 56'; Tavares 87', 90+6'	Report		Stadium: Pirelli Stadium; Attendance: 2,523; Referee: Declan Brown

1 November 2025	Buxton (6)	2–1 (a.e.t.)	Chatham Town (7)	Buxton
15:00 GMT	Campbell 62'; Kirby 114'	Report	Fadahunsi 46'	Stadium: The Silverlands; Attendance: 1,652; Referee: William Davis

1 November 2025	Cambridge United (4)	3–0	Chester (6)	Cambridge
15:00 GMT	Kouassi 10', 35'; Brophy 45+3'	Report		Stadium: Abbey Stadium; Attendance: 4,329; Referee: David Rock

1 November 2025	Cheltenham Town (4)	1–0	Bradford City (3)	Cheltenham
15:00 GMT	Hutchinson 2'	Report		Stadium: Whaddon Road; Attendance: 3,075; Referee: Robert Massey-Ellis

1 November 2025	Colchester United (4)	2–3	Milton Keynes Dons (4)	Colchester
15:00 GMT	Mbick 26'; Anderson 48'	Report	Hepburn-Murphy 37', 58'; Tomlinson 87'	Stadium: Colchester Community Stadium; Attendance: 3,639; Referee: Abigail Byrne

1 November 2025	Crewe Alexandra (4)	1–2	Doncaster Rovers (3)	Crewe
15:00 GMT	Demetriou 45'	Report	Sharp 54'; Bailey 90+2'	Stadium: Gresty Road; Attendance: 2,996; Referee: Neil Hair

1 November 2025	FC Halifax Town (5)	0–2	Exeter City (3)	Halifax
15:00 GMT		Report	Andrew 2'; Wareham 45+4'	Stadium: The Shay; Attendance: 1,994; Referee: Andrew Miller

1 November 2025	Fleetwood Town (4)	2–1	Barnet (4)	Fleetwood
15:00 GMT	Medley 11'; Holgate 86'	Report	Stead 89'	Stadium: Highbury Stadium; Attendance: 1,076; Referee: Scott Jackson

1 November 2025	Grimsby Town (4)	3–1	Ebbsfleet United (6)	Cleethorpes
15:00 GMT	Rose 53', 67'; McJannet 65'	Report	Seaman 34'	Stadium: Blundell Park; Attendance: 3,392; Referee: Jamie O'Connor

1 November 2025	Macclesfield (6)	6–3	AFC Totton (6)	Macclesfield
15:00 GMT	Elliott 6', 14', 36'; Dawson 46'; Menayese 64'; Fensome 79'	Report	Lee 9'; Rendell 17', 27'	Stadium: Moss Rose; Attendance: 2,197; Referee: Ollie Yates

1 November 2025	Mansfield Town (3)	3–2	Harrogate Town (4)	Mansfield
15:00 GMT	Hendry 4'; Maris 67', 83'	Report	Duke-McKenna 57'; O'Connor 80'	Stadium: Field Mill; Attendance: 3,301; Referee: Wayne Cartmel

1 November 2025	Newport County (4)	2–2 (a.e.t.) (4–3 p)	Gillingham (4)	Newport
15:00 GMT	Ca. Evans 32'; Antwi 109'	Report	Nevitt 14'; Palmer-Houlden 118'	Stadium: Rodney Parade; Attendance: 2,596; Referee: Ross Martin
	Penalties
	Baker-Richardson (penalty scored); Braybrooke (penalty missed); Antwi (penalty scored); Kamwa (penalty scored); Lloyd (penalty scored)		(penalty scored) Clark; (penalty missed) Hutton; (penalty missed) Vokes; (penalty scored) Khumbeni; (penalty scored) Palmer-Houlden

1 November 2025	Oldham Athletic (4)	3–1	Northampton Town (3)	Oldham
15:00 GMT	Mellon 3', 4', 50'	Report	McGeehan 90+1'	Stadium: Boundary Park; Attendance: 3,693; Referee: Peter Wright

1 November 2025	Peterborough United (3)	1–0	Cardiff City (3)	Peterborough
15:00 GMT	Leonard 38'	Report		Stadium: London Road Stadium; Attendance: 4,405; Referee: Seb Stockbridge

1 November 2025	Reading (3)	2–3 (a.e.t.)	Carlisle United (5)	Reading
15:00 GMT	Wing 32'; O'Mahony 86'	Report	Linney 90+3', 90+8', 94'	Stadium: Madejski Stadium; Attendance: 3,929; Referee: Ruebyn Ricardo

1 November 2025	Rotherham United (3)	1–2 (a.e.t.)	Swindon Town (4)	Rotherham
15:00 GMT	Nombe 5'	Report	Palmer 72'; Oldaker 116'	Stadium: New York Stadium; Attendance: 3,351; Referee: Martin Woods

1 November 2025	Salford City (4)	1–1 (a.e.t.) (4–2 p)	Lincoln City (3)	Salford
15:00 GMT	N'Mai 90+3'	Report	Ring 26'	Stadium: Moor Lane; Attendance: 1,951; Referee: Steven Copeland
	Penalties
	Borini (penalty scored); Garbutt (penalty scored); Woodburn (penalty scored); Udoh (penalty scored)		(penalty scored) Street; (penalty missed) Bayliss; (penalty scored) Obikwu; (penalty missed) McGrandles

1 November 2025	Slough Town (6)	2–1	Altrincham (5)	Slough
15:00 GMT	Janneh 33'; Makowski 37'	Report	Gale 65'	Stadium: Arbour Park; Attendance: 1,531; Referee: Elliott Swallow

1 November 2025	Spennymoor Town (6)	0–2	Barrow (4)	Spennymoor
15:00 GMT		Report	Newby 40'; Hemmings 72'	Stadium: Brewery Field; Attendance: 2,283; Referee: Zac Kennard-Kettle

1 November 2025	Stevenage (3)	0–1	Chesterfield (4)	Stevenage
15:00 GMT		Report	Bonis 61' (pen.)	Stadium: Broadhall Way; Attendance: 2,084; Referee: Alan Young

1 November 2025	Sutton United (5)	2–1	AFC Telford United (6)	Sutton
15:00 GMT	Ogbonna 39'; Nadesan 52'	Report	Dinanga 64'	Stadium: Gander Green Lane; Attendance: 1,575; Referee: Alex Chilowicz

1 November 2025	Tranmere Rovers (4)	1–3	Stockport County (3)	Birkenhead
15:00 GMT	Pye (o.g.) 71'	Report	Diamond 55'; Norwood 74'; Lowe 90+1'	Stadium: Prenton Park; Attendance: 5,164; Referee: Simon Mather

1 November 2025	Wealdstone (5)	1–0	Southend United (5)	Ruislip
15:00 GMT	Olomola 19'	Report		Stadium: Grosvenor Vale; Attendance: 2,146; Referee: Carl Brook

1 November 2025	Weston-super-Mare (6)	2–1 (a.e.t.)	Aldershot Town (5)	Weston-super-Mare
15:00 GMT	Lewis 84'; Waite 110'	Report	Rai 21'	Stadium: Woodspring Stadium; Attendance: 2,577; Referee: James Durkin

1 November 2025	Wigan Athletic (3)	1–1 (a.e.t.) (5–3 p)	Hemel Hempstead Town (6)	Wigan
15:00 GMT	Wright 25'	Report	White 61' (pen.)	Stadium: Brick Community Stadium; Attendance: 4,020; Referee: Aaron Bannister
	Penalties
	McManaman (penalty scored); Kerr (penalty scored); Aimson (penalty scored); Saydee (penalty scored); Fox (penalty scored)		(penalty scored) Brown; (penalty missed) Azeez; (penalty scored) Gray; (penalty scored) Noel-Williams

1 November 2025	Wycombe Wanderers (3)	2–0	Plymouth Argyle (3)	High Wycombe
15:00 GMT	Woodrow 67' (pen.), 79'	Report		Stadium: Adams Park; Attendance: 3,571; Referee: Scott Oldham

1 November 2025	Brackley Town (5)	2–2 (a.e.t.) (4–3 p)	Notts County (4)	Brackley
17:30 GMT	Lowe 27'; Stewart 90+6' (pen.)	Report	Jatta 13'; Jones 51' (pen.)	Stadium: St James Park; Attendance: 2,233; Referee: Ben Atkinson
	Penalties
	Stewart (penalty scored); Lyttle (penalty scored); Waldron (penalty missed); Pollock (penalty scored); Brown (penalty scored)		(penalty missed) Jatta; (penalty scored) Dennis; (penalty missed) Bennetts; (penalty scored) Jarvis; (penalty scored) Kouhyar

2 November 2025	South Shields (6)	1–3	Shrewsbury Town (4)	Jarrow
12:00 GMT	Woolston 67'	Report	Scully 23' (pen.), 34'; Sang 44'	Stadium: Mariners Park; Attendance: 3,570; Referee: Thomas Parsons

2 November 2025	Eastleigh (5)	0–3	Walsall (4)	Eastleigh
14:15 GMT		Report	Weir 6'; Kanu 50'; Matt 79'	Stadium: Ten Acres; Attendance: 2,389; Referee: Lee Swabey

2 November 2025	Port Vale (3)	5–1	Maldon & Tiptree (8)	Stoke-on-Trent
15:00 GMT	Paton 15', 18'; Hall 16'; Cole 24', 56'	Report	Lewis 6'	Stadium: Vale Park; Attendance: 4,551; Referee: Richard Eley

2 November 2025	Gainsborough Trinity (7)	1–2 (a.e.t.)	Accrington Stanley (4)	Gainsborough
17:15 GMT	Tuntulwana 76'	Report	Madden 29'; Caton 95'	Stadium: The Northolme; Attendance: 2,612; Referee: Andrew Humphries

3 November 2025	Tamworth (5)	0–1	Leyton Orient (3)	Tamworth
19:30 GMT		Report	Digie 79' (o.g.)	Stadium: The Lamb Ground; Attendance: 2,820; Referee: Matthew Corlett

== Second round ==
The 40 winners from the first round played in the second round. Sixth tier sides Buxton and Macclesfield from National League North, Chelmsford City, Slough Town and Weston-super-Mare from National League South were the lowest-ranked teams in the draw.

The draw was made on 3 November 2025 by Joleon Lescott and Steve Sidwell, and took place at The Lamb Ground, Tamworth, prior to the first round tie between Tamworth and Leyton Orient.

Number of teams per tier still in competition
Premier League (Note: Premier League and Championship teams joined the competition in the third round.)	Championship	League One	League Two	Non-League	Total
20 / 20	24 / 24	14 / 24	15 / 24	11 / 32	84 / 124

5 December 2025	Salford City (4)	4–0	Leyton Orient (3)	Salford
19:30 GMT	Cahill 23' (o.g.); Cesay 61'; Borini 87'; N'Mai 90+1'	Report		Stadium: Moor Lane; Attendance: 1,796; Referee: Ben Speedie

6 December 2025	Accrington Stanley (4)	2–2 (a.e.t.) (1–3 p)	Mansfield Town (3)	Accrington
15:00 GMT	Heath 27'; Madden 102'	Report	Evans 53'; McAdam 105+2'	Stadium: Crown Ground; Attendance: 1,873; Referee: Stephen Parkinson
	Penalties
	Bauress (penalty missed); Brown (penalty scored); Ward (penalty missed); Heath (penalty missed)		(penalty scored) Akins; (penalty scored) Oshilaja; (penalty scored) Reed

6 December 2025	Chelmsford City (6)	0–2	Weston-super-Mare (6)	Chelmsford
15:00 GMT		Report	Britton 62', 88'	Stadium: Melbourne Stadium; Attendance: 3,628; Referee: Carl Brook

6 December 2025	Cheltenham Town (4)	6–2	Buxton (6)	Cheltenham
15:00 GMT	Hutchinson 29', 74'; Cundy 58'; Thomas 62', 90'; Archer 79'	Report	Sodje 13'; Ward 45+2'	Stadium: Whaddon Road; Attendance: 3,589; Referee: Charles Breakspear

6 December 2025	Exeter City (3)	4–0	Wycombe Wanderers (3)	Exeter
15:00 GMT	Aitchison 39', 59'; Higgins 80'; Wareham 90+7'	Report		Stadium: St James Park; Attendance: 5,161; Referee: James Durkin

6 December 2025	Fleetwood Town (4)	2–2 (a.e.t.) (4–2 p)	Luton Town (3)	Fleetwood
15:00 GMT	Ennis 65', 83'	Report	Yates 73'; Mengi 90+3'	Stadium: Highbury Stadium; Attendance: 1,180; Referee: Ollie Yates
	Penalties
	Coughlan (penalty scored); Ennis (penalty scored); Holgate (penalty scored); Neal (penalty scored)		(penalty scored) Kodua; (penalty scored) Naismith; (penalty missed) Brown; (penalty missed) Walsh

6 December 2025	Grimsby Town (4)	4–0	Wealdstone (5)	Cleethorpes
15:00 GMT	Kabia 7', 53'; Green 15'; Walker 23'	Report		Stadium: Blundell Park; Attendance: 3,655; Referee: Matthew Russell

6 December 2025	Milton Keynes Dons (4)	3–1	Oldham Athletic (4)	Milton Keynes
15:00 GMT	Tomlinson 42'; Kelly 57'; Mendez-Laing 90+2'	Report	Hannant 76' (pen.)	Stadium: Stadium MK; Attendance: 3,065; Referee: Zac Kennard-Kettle

6 December 2025	Peterborough United (3)	0–1	Barnsley (3)	Peterborough
15:00 GMT		Report	Kelly 73'	Stadium: London Road Stadium; Attendance: 4,157; Referee: Alan Young

6 December 2025	Port Vale (3)	1–0	Bristol Rovers (4)	Stoke-on-Trent
15:00 GMT	Waine 47'	Report		Stadium: Vale Park; Attendance: 3,227; Referee: Ross Joyce

6 December 2025	Stockport County (3)	0–0 (a.e.t.) (4–5 p)	Cambridge United (4)	Stockport
15:00 GMT		Report		Stadium: Edgeley Park; Attendance: 5,105; Referee: Richard Eley
	Penalties
	Moxon (penalty missed); Osborn (penalty scored); Diamond (penalty scored); Wootton (penalty scored); O'Keeffe (penalty scored)		(penalty scored) Smith; (penalty scored) Watts; (penalty scored) McConnell; (penalty scored) Mayor; (penalty scored) Gibbons

6 December 2025	Swindon Town (4)	4–0	Bolton Wanderers (3)	Swindon
15:00 GMT	Drinan 8' (pen.), 76', 86'; Snowdon 55'	Report		Stadium: County Ground; Attendance: 9,364; Referee: Lee Swabey

6 December 2025	Wigan Athletic (3)	2–2 (a.e.t.) (4–3 p)	Barrow (4)	Wigan
15:00 GMT	Carragher 13'; Aimson 89'	Report	Earing 65'; Canavan 85'	Stadium: Brick Community Stadium; Attendance: 4,623; Referee: Martin Coy
	Penalties
	McManaman (penalty scored); Murray (penalty scored); Aimson (penalty scored); Saydee (penalty scored)		(penalty scored) McCann; (penalty scored) Newby; (penalty missed) Jackson; (penalty scored) Gordon; (penalty missed) Williams

6 December 2025	Sutton United (5)	1–2 (a.e.t.)	Shrewsbury Town (4)	Sutton
17:15 GMT	Jennings 69'	Report	Kabia 90+1'; Marquis 92'	Stadium: Gander Green Lane; Attendance: 2,505; Referee: Jacob Miles

6 December 2025	Chesterfield (4)	1–2	Doncaster Rovers (3)	Chesterfield
19:30 GMT	Bonis 31'	Report	Bailey 34'; Senior 90'	Stadium: SMH Group Stadium; Attendance: 6,175; Referee: Neil Hair

7 December 2025	Slough Town (6)	1–3 (a.e.t.)	Macclesfield (6)	Slough
12:30 GMT	Makowski 86' (pen.)	Report	Elliott 68' (pen.); Edmondson 93'; Griffiths 120+7'	Stadium: Arbour Park; Attendance: 2,500; Referee: Aaron Farmer

7 December 2025	Boreham Wood (5)	3–0	Newport County (4)	Borehamwood
14:30 GMT	King 32'; Booty 35'; Rush 59'	Report		Stadium: Meadow Park; Attendance: 1,825; Referee: Paul Howard

7 December 2025	Gateshead (5)	0–2	Walsall (4)	Gateshead
15:30 GMT		Report	Kanu 25' (pen.); Flint 49'	Stadium: Gateshead International Stadium; Attendance: 1,608; Referee: James Oldham

7 December 2025	Blackpool (3)	4–1	Carlisle United (5)	Blackpool
17:30 GMT	Bloxham 14'; Fletcher 34', 57'; Banks 38'	Report	Armstrong 51'	Stadium: Bloomfield Road; Attendance: 5,958; Referee: Tom Reeves

8 December 2025	Brackley Town (5)	1–3	Burton Albion (3)	Brackley
19:30 GMT	Nottingham 25'	Report	Shade 13', 73', 88'	Stadium: St James Park; Attendance: 2,978; Referee: Alex Chilowicz

== Third round ==
A total of 64 clubs played in the third round: 20 winners from the second round, 20 from the Premier League (tier 1), and 24 from the Championship (tier 2). Sixth tier sides Macclesfield (National League North) and Weston-super-Mare (National League South) were the lowest-ranked teams in the draw.

The draw was made on 8 December 2025 by Joe Cole and Peter Crouch, and took place at St James Park, Brackley, prior to the second round tie between Brackley Town and Burton Albion.

Number of teams per tier still in competition
Premier League	Championship	League One	League Two	Non-League	Total
20 / 20	24 / 24	8 / 24	9 / 24	3 / 32	64 / 124

9 January 2026	Milton Keynes Dons (4)	1–1 (a.e.t.) (3–4 p)	Oxford United (2)	Milton Keynes
19:30 GMT	Collins 34'	Report	Lankshear 52'	Stadium: Stadium MK; Attendance: 5,902; Referee: Paul Howard
	Penalties
	Sanders (penalty scored); Leko (penalty missed); Matete (penalty scored); Paterson (penalty scored); Lemonheigh-Evans (penalty missed)		(penalty scored) Romeny; (penalty scored) Harris; (penalty scored) Peart-Harris; (penalty scored) Phillips

9 January 2026	Port Vale (3)	1–0	Fleetwood Town (4)	Stoke-on-Trent
19:30 GMT	Shipley 45+2'	Report		Stadium: Vale Park; Attendance: 3,366; Referee: Ben Speedie

9 January 2026	Preston North End (2)	0–1	Wigan Athletic (3)	Preston
19:30 GMT		Report	Bettoni 75'	Stadium: Deepdale; Attendance: 14,366; Referee: Oliver Langford

9 January 2026	Wrexham (2)	3–3 (a.e.t.) (4–3 p)	Nottingham Forest (1)	Wrexham
19:30 GMT	Cacace 37'; Rathbone 40'; Hyam 74'	Report	Igor Jesus 64'; Hudson-Odoi 76', 89'	Stadium: Racecourse Ground; Attendance: 10,603; Referee: Paul Tierney
	Penalties
	Windass (penalty scored); McClean (penalty missed); Doyle (penalty scored); Thomason (penalty scored); Rodriguez (penalty scored)		(penalty scored) Gibbs-White; (penalty missed) Igor Jesus; (penalty scored) Hudson-Odoi; (penalty scored) Williams; (penalty missed) Hutchinson

10 January 2026	Cheltenham Town (4)	0–2	Leicester City (2)	Cheltenham
12:15 GMT		Report	Daka 23'; Mavididi 45'	Stadium: Whaddon Road; Attendance: 6,677; Referee: James Linington

10 January 2026	Everton (1)	1–1 (a.e.t.) (0–3 p)	Sunderland (1)	Liverpool
12:15 GMT	Garner 89' (pen.)	Report	Le Fée 30'	Stadium: Hill Dickinson Stadium; Attendance: 51,588; Referee: John Brooks
	Penalties
	Garner (penalty missed); Barry (penalty missed); Beto (penalty missed)		(penalty scored) Le Fée; (penalty scored) Xhaka; (penalty scored) O'Nien

10 January 2026	Macclesfield (6)	2–1	Crystal Palace (1)	Macclesfield
12:15 GMT	Dawson 43'; Buckley-Ricketts 60'	Report	Pino 90'	Stadium: Moss Rose; Attendance: 5,348; Referee: Tim Robinson

10 January 2026	Wolverhampton Wanderers (1)	6–1	Shrewsbury Town (4)	Wolverhampton
12:15 GMT	Larsen 9', 41', 58'; Arias 11'; R. Gomes 86'; Arokodare 90+2'	Report	Marquis 26' (pen.)	Stadium: Molineux Stadium; Attendance: 24,258; Referee: Stephen Martin

10 January 2026	Boreham Wood (5)	0–5	Burton Albion (3)	Borehamwood
15:00 GMT		Report	Lofthouse 35'; O'Connell 41' (o.g.); Tavares 67'; Williams 83'; McKiernan 90+2'	Stadium: Meadow Park; Attendance: 2,201; Referee: Andrew Humphries

10 January 2026	Burnley (1)	5–1	Millwall (2)	Burnley
15:00 GMT	Barnes 11', 65'; Tchaouna 35'; Anthony 44'; Banel 89'	Report	Coburn 90+4'	Stadium: Turf Moor; Attendance: 6,856; Referee: Anthony Backhouse

10 January 2026	Doncaster Rovers (3)	2–3	Southampton (2)	Doncaster
15:00 GMT	Pearson 48'; Gibson 59'	Report	Bragg 8'; Archer 24'; Matsuki 41'	Stadium: Eco-Power Stadium; Attendance: 7,671; Referee: John Busby

10 January 2026	Fulham (1)	3–1	Middlesbrough (2)	Fulham
15:00 GMT	Wilson 60'; Smith Rowe 77'; Kevin 90+3'	Report	Hackney 30'	Stadium: Craven Cottage; Attendance: 20,675; Referee: Lewis Smith

10 January 2026	Ipswich Town (2)	2–1	Blackpool (3)	Ipswich
15:00 GMT	Philogene 35'; Greaves 87'	Report	Fletcher 90+6' (pen.)	Stadium: Portman Road; Attendance: 27,527; Referee: Thomas Parsons

10 January 2026	Manchester City (1)	10–1	Exeter City (3)	Manchester
15:00 GMT	Alleyne 12'; Rodri 24'; Doyle-Hayes 42' (o.g.); Fitzwater 45+2' (o.g.); Lewis 49', 90+1'; Semenyo 54'; Reijnders 71'; O'Reilly 79'; McAidoo 86'	Report	Birch 90'	Stadium: City of Manchester Stadium; Attendance: 50,705; Referee: Adam Herczeg

10 January 2026	Newcastle United (1)	3–3 (a.e.t.) (7–6 p)	Bournemouth (1)	Newcastle upon Tyne
15:00 GMT	Barnes 50', 118'; Gordon 90+5' (pen.)	Report	Scott 62'; Brooks 68'; Tavernier 120+2'	Stadium: St James' Park; Attendance: 51,563; Referee: Thomas Bramall
	Penalties
	Gordon (penalty scored); Woltemade (penalty missed); Bruno Guimarães (penalty missed); Tonali (penalty scored); Joelinton (penalty scored); Hall (penalty scored); Miley (penalty scored); Barnes (penalty scored); Thiaw (penalty scored)		(penalty scored) Tavernier; (penalty missed) Evanilson; (penalty scored) Cook; (penalty missed) Jiménez; (penalty scored) Senesi; (penalty scored) Hill; (penalty scored) Truffert; (penalty scored) Smith; (penalty missed) Diakité

10 January 2026	Sheffield Wednesday (2)	0–2	Brentford (1)	Sheffield
15:00 GMT		Report	Lewis-Potter 27'; Jensen 64' (pen.)	Stadium: Hillsborough Stadium; Attendance: 10,642; Referee: Josh Smith

10 January 2026	Stoke City (2)	1–0	Coventry City (2)	Stoke-on-Trent
15:00 GMT	Cissé 88'	Report		Stadium: Bet365 Stadium; Attendance: 13,894; Referee: Tom Nield

10 January 2026	Bristol City (2)	5–1	Watford (2)	Bristol
17:45 GMT	Riis 2', 68', 76'; Mehmeti 37'; Atkinson 66'	Report	Grieves 74'	Stadium: Ashton Gate; Attendance: 13,291; Referee: Tom Reeves

10 January 2026	Cambridge United (4)	2–3	Birmingham City (2)	Cambridge
17:45 GMT	Kaikai 80', 89'	Report	Wagner 31'; Furuhashi 42'; Ducksch 78'	Stadium: Abbey Stadium; Attendance: 6,241; Referee: Matthew Corlett

10 January 2026	Grimsby Town (4)	3–2	Weston-super-Mare (6)	Cleethorpes
17:45 GMT	Vernam 41'; Kabia 70'; Green 86'	Report	Coulson 49'; Britton 77'	Stadium: Blundell Park; Attendance: 4,851; Referee: Martin Coy

10 January 2026	Tottenham Hotspur (1)	1–2	Aston Villa (1)	Tottenham
17:45 GMT	Odobert 54'	Report	Buendía 22'; Rogers 45+3'	Stadium: Tottenham Hotspur Stadium; Attendance: 57,718; Referee: Craig Pawson

10 January 2026	Charlton Athletic (2)	1–5	Chelsea (1)	Charlton
20:00 GMT	Leaburn 57'	Report	Hato 45+4'; Adarabioyo 50'; Guiu 62'; Neto 90+1'; Fernández 90+4' (pen.)	Stadium: The Valley; Attendance: 26,475; Referee: Chris Kavanagh

11 January 2026	Derby County (2)	1–3	Leeds United (1)	Derby
12:00 GMT	Brereton 35'	Report	Gnonto 55'; Tanaka 59'; Justin 90+3'	Stadium: Pride Park Stadium; Attendance: 21,741; Referee: Anthony Taylor

11 January 2026	Portsmouth (2)	1–4	Arsenal (1)	Portsmouth
14:00 GMT	Bishop 3'	Report	Dozzell 8' (o.g.); Martinelli 25', 51', 72'	Stadium: Fratton Park; Attendance: 20,611; Referee: Tony Harrington

11 January 2026	Hull City (2)	0–0 (a.e.t.) (4–3 p)	Blackburn Rovers (2)	Kingston upon Hull
14:30 GMT		Report		Stadium: MKM Stadium; Attendance: 6,627; Referee: Will Finnie
	Penalties
	Coyle (penalty missed); Joseph (penalty scored); McBurnie (penalty scored); Hughes (penalty scored); Akintola (penalty scored)		(penalty missed) Ōhashi; (penalty missed) Baradji; (penalty scored) Gardner-Hickman; (penalty scored) McLoughlin; (penalty scored) Doherty

11 January 2026	Norwich City (2)	5–1	Walsall (4)	Norwich
14:30 GMT	Jurásek 15'; Makama 24', 48', 55'; Springett 90+2'	Report	Clarke 67'	Stadium: Carrow Road; Attendance: 19,776; Referee: Edward Duckworth

11 January 2026	Sheffield United (2)	3–4	Mansfield Town (3)	Sheffield
14:30 GMT	Hamer 20'; Bamford 61'; Moriah-Welsh 65' (o.g.)	Report	Reed 13', 44'; Akins 50'; Oates 57'	Stadium: Bramall Lane; Attendance: 17,514; Referee: Gavin Ward

11 January 2026	Swansea City (2)	2–2 (a.e.t.) (5–6 p)	West Bromwich Albion (2)	Swansea
14:30 GMT	Eom Ji-sung 48'; Inoussa 112'	Report	Maja 53'; Wallace 108'	Stadium: Swansea.com Stadium; Attendance: 9,981; Referee: Elliot Bell
	Penalties
	Cabango (penalty scored); Fulton (penalty scored); Galbraith (penalty scored); Burgess (penalty scored); Inoussa (penalty scored); Wales (penalty missed); Yalcouyé (penalty missed)		(penalty scored) Heggebø; (penalty scored) Price; (penalty scored) Styles; (penalty scored) Grant; (penalty scored) Wallace; (penalty missed) Mepham; (penalty scored) Bostock

11 January 2026	West Ham United (1)	2–1 (a.e.t.)	Queens Park Rangers (2)	Stratford
14:30 GMT	Summerville 45+10'; Castellanos 98'	Report	Kone 65'	Stadium: London Stadium; Attendance: 58,669; Referee: Thomas Kirk

11 January 2026	Manchester United (1)	1–2	Brighton & Hove Albion (1)	Trafford
16:30 GMT	Šeško 85'	Report	Gruda 12'; Welbeck 64'	Stadium: Old Trafford; Attendance: 73,888; Referee: Simon Hooper

12 January 2026	Liverpool (1)	4–1	Barnsley (3)	Liverpool
19:45 GMT	Szoboszlai 9'; Frimpong 36'; Wirtz 84'; Ekitike 90+4'	Report	Phillips 40'	Stadium: Anfield; Attendance: 60,206; Referee: Farai Hallam

20 January 2026	Salford City (4)	3–2	Swindon Town (4)	Salford
19:45 GMT	Graydon 11', 52'; Garbutt 68'	Report	Palmer 55'; Ball 60'	Stadium: Moor Lane; Attendance: 2,215; Referee: Alex Chilowicz
Note: The game was postponed due to a frozen pitch.

== Fourth round ==
The 32 winners from the third round played in the fourth round. National League North (tier 6) side Macclesfield was again the lowest-ranked team in the draw. In reaching this stage, Macclesfield equalled the best-ever Cup performance of Macclesfield Town, who had competed in the fourth round of the 2012–13 tournament. Elsewhere, Mansfield Town's surprise victory over Premier League outfit Burnley was the Stags' first Cup win over top-tier opponents since 1969.

The draw was made on 12 January 2026 by Joleon Lescott and Steve McManaman, and took place at Anfield, Liverpool, prior to the third round match between Liverpool and Barnsley.

Number of teams per tier still in competition
Premier League	Championship	League One	League Two	Non-League	Total
14 / 20	11 / 24	4 / 24	2 / 24	1 / 32	32 / 124

13 February 2026	Hull City (2)	0–4	Chelsea (1)	Kingston upon Hull
19:45 GMT		Report	Neto 40', 51', 71'; Estêvão 59'	Stadium: MKM Stadium; Attendance: 24,320; Referee: Farai Hallam

13 February 2026	Wrexham (2)	1–0	Ipswich Town (2)	Wrexham
19:45 GMT	Windass 34'	Report		Stadium: Racecourse Ground; Attendance: 10,496; Referee: Benjamin Speedie

14 February 2026	Burton Albion (3)	0–1 (a.e.t.)	West Ham United (1)	Burton upon Trent
12:15 GMT		Report	Summerville 95'	Stadium: Pirelli Stadium; Attendance: 6,514; Referee: Lewis Smith

14 February 2026	Burnley (1)	1–2	Mansfield Town (3)	Burnley
15:00 GMT	Laurent 21'	Report	Oates 53'; Reed 80'	Stadium: Turf Moor; Attendance: 11,914; Referee: Gavin Ward

14 February 2026	Manchester City (1)	2–0	Salford City (4)	Manchester
15:00 GMT	Dorrington 6' (o.g.); Guéhi 81'	Report		Stadium: City of Manchester Stadium; Attendance: 46,774; Referee: Matthew Donohue

14 February 2026	Norwich City (2)	3–1	West Bromwich Albion (2)	Norwich
15:00 GMT	Maghoma 31'; Chrisene 82'; Touré 90+3'	Report	Maja 68'	Stadium: Carrow Road; Attendance: 25,538; Referee: Tom Reeves

14 February 2026	Southampton (2)	2–1 (a.e.t.)	Leicester City (2)	Southampton
15:00 GMT	Larin 45+1' (pen.); Bree 109'	Report	Skipp 52'	Stadium: St Mary's Stadium; Attendance: 17,359; Referee: Matt Corlett

14 February 2026	Aston Villa (1)	1–3	Newcastle United (1)	Birmingham
17:45 GMT	Abraham 14'	Report	Tonali 63', 76'; Woltemade 88'	Stadium: Villa Park; Attendance: 42,101; Referee: Chris Kavanagh

14 February 2026	Liverpool (1)	3–0	Brighton & Hove Albion (1)	Liverpool
20:00 GMT	Jones 42'; Szoboszlai 56'; Salah 68' (pen.)	Report		Stadium: Anfield; Attendance: 60,227; Referee: Stuart Attwell

15 February 2026	Birmingham City (2)	1–1 (a.e.t.) (2–4 p)	Leeds United (1)	Birmingham
12:00 GMT	Roberts 89'	Report	Nmecha 49'	Stadium: St Andrew's; Attendance: 28,035; Referee: Paul Tierney
	Penalties
	Stansfield (penalty scored); Ducksch (penalty scored); Doyle (penalty missed); Roberts (penalty missed)		(penalty scored) Piroe; (penalty scored) Calvert-Lewin; (penalty scored) Aaronson; (penalty scored) Longstaff

15 February 2026	Grimsby Town (4)	0–1	Wolverhampton Wanderers (1)	Cleethorpes
13:30 GMT		Report	S. Bueno 60'	Stadium: Blundell Park; Attendance: 8,594; Referee: Sam Barrott

15 February 2026	Oxford United (2)	0–1	Sunderland (1)	Oxford
14:00 GMT		Report	Diarra 32' (pen.)	Stadium: Kassam Stadium; Attendance: 9,879; Referee: Thomas Kirk

15 February 2026	Stoke City (2)	1–2	Fulham (1)	Stoke-on-Trent
14:00 GMT	Bae Jun-ho 19'	Report	Kevin 55'; Reed 84'	Stadium: Bet365 Stadium; Attendance: 14,871; Referee: Josh Smith

15 February 2026	Arsenal (1)	4–0	Wigan Athletic (3)	Holloway
16:30 GMT	Madueke 11'; Martinelli 18'; Hunt 23' (o.g.); Gabriel Jesus 27'	Report		Stadium: Emirates Stadium; Attendance: 59,996; Referee: Tim Robinson

16 February 2026	Macclesfield (6)	0–1	Brentford (1)	Macclesfield
19:30 GMT		Report	Heathcote 70' (o.g.)	Stadium: Moss Rose; Attendance: 5,348; Referee: Darren England

3 March 2026	Port Vale (3)	1–0 (a.e.t.)	Bristol City (2)	Stoke-on-Trent
19:45 GMT	Waine 112'	Report		Stadium: Vale Park; Attendance: 4,611; Referee: Elliot Bell
Note: The game was postponed due to a waterlogged pitch.

== Fifth round ==
The 16 winners from the fourth round played in the fifth round. League One sides Mansfield Town and Port Vale were the lowest-ranked teams remaining in the draw.

The draw was made on 16 February 2026 by Karen Carney and Joe Cole, and took place at Moss Rose, Macclesfield, prior to the fourth round match between Macclesfield and Brentford.

Number of teams per tier still in competition
Premier League	Championship	League One	League Two	Non-League	Total
11 / 20	3 / 24	2 / 24	0 / 24	0 / 32	16 / 124

6 March 2026	Wolverhampton Wanderers (1)	1–3	Liverpool (1)	Wolverhampton
20:00 GMT	Hwang Hee-chan 90+1'	Report	Robertson 51'; Salah 55'; Jones 74'	Stadium: Molineux Stadium; Attendance: 29,881; Referee: Farai Hallam

7 March 2026	Mansfield Town (3)	1–2	Arsenal (1)	Mansfield
12:15 GMT	Evans 50'	Report	Madueke 41'; Eze 66'	Stadium: Field Mill; Attendance: 9,260; Referee: Thomas Bramall

7 March 2026	Wrexham (2)	2–4 (a.e.t.)	Chelsea (1)	Wrexham
17:45 GMT	Smith 18'; Doyle 78'	Report	Okonkwo 40' (o.g.); Acheampong 82'; Garnacho 96'; João Pedro 120+5'	Stadium: Racecourse Ground; Attendance: 10,556; Referee: Peter Bankes

7 March 2026	Newcastle United (1)	1–3	Manchester City (1)	Newcastle upon Tyne
20:00 GMT	Barnes 18'	Report	Savinho 39'; Marmoush 47', 65'	Stadium: St James' Park; Attendance: 51,109; Referee: Sam Barrott

8 March 2026	Fulham (1)	0–1	Southampton (2)	Fulham
12:00 GMT		Report	Stewart 90+1' (pen.)	Stadium: Craven Cottage; Attendance: 21,974; Referee: Jarred Gillett

8 March 2026	Port Vale (3)	1–0	Sunderland (1)	Stoke-on-Trent
13:30 GMT	Waine 28'	Report		Stadium: Vale Park; Attendance: 10,685; Referee: Anthony Taylor

8 March 2026	Leeds United (1)	3–0	Norwich City (2)	Leeds
16:30 GMT	Longstaff 32'; Gudmundsson 43'; Piroe 85'	Report		Stadium: Elland Road; Attendance: 36,313; Referee: Darren England

9 March 2026	West Ham United (1)	2–2 (a.e.t.) (5–3 p)	Brentford (1)	Stratford
19:30 GMT	Bowen 19', 34' (pen.)	Report	Thiago 28', 81' (pen.)	Stadium: London Stadium; Attendance: 48,570; Referee: Andrew Madley
	Penalties
	Bowen (penalty scored); Castellanos (penalty scored); Wilson (penalty scored); Souček (penalty scored); Mavropanos (penalty scored)		(penalty scored) Thiago; (penalty missed) Ouattara; (penalty scored) Lewis-Potter; (penalty scored) Jensen

== Quarter-finals ==
The eight winners from the fifth round played in the quarter-finals. League One side Port Vale was the lowest-ranked team remaining in the draw, featuring at this stage for the first time since reaching the semi-finals in 1953–54. The matches were played on the weekend of 4 April 2026.

The draw was made on 9 March 2026 by Joe Cole and Joe Hart, and took place at London Stadium, Stratford, prior to the fifth round match between West Ham United and Brentford.

Number of teams per tier still in competition
Premier League	Championship	League One	League Two	Non-League	Total
6 / 20	1 / 24	1 / 24	0 / 24	0 / 32	8 / 124

4 April 2026	Manchester City (1)	4–0	Liverpool (1)	Manchester
12:45 BST	Haaland 39' (pen.), 45+2', 57'; Semenyo 50'	Report		Stadium: City of Manchester Stadium; Attendance: 50,754; Referee: Michael Oliver

4 April 2026	Chelsea (1)	7–0	Port Vale (3)	Fulham
17:15 BST	Hato 2'; João Pedro 25'; Lawrence-Gabriel 43' (o.g.); Adarabioyo 57'; Santos 69'; Estêvão 82'; Garnacho 90+2' (pen.)	Report		Stadium: Stamford Bridge; Attendance: 38,375; Referee: Farai Hallam

4 April 2026	Southampton (2)	2–1	Arsenal (1)	Southampton
20:00 BST	Stewart 35'; Charles 85'	Report	Gyökeres 68'	Stadium: St Mary's Stadium; Attendance: 31,067; Referee: Sam Barrott

5 April 2026	West Ham United (1)	2–2 (a.e.t.) (2–4 p)	Leeds United (1)	Stratford
16:30 BST	Fernandes 90+3'; Disasi 90+6'	Report	Tanaka 26'; Calvert-Lewin 75' (pen.)	Stadium: London Stadium; Attendance: 62,260; Referee: Craig Pawson
	Penalties
	Bowen (penalty missed); Walker-Peters (penalty scored); Souček (penalty scored); Pablo (penalty missed)		(penalty missed) Piroe; (penalty scored) Calvert-Lewin; (penalty scored) Aaronson; (penalty scored) Gnonto; (penalty scored) Struijk

== Semi-finals ==
The four winners from the quarter-finals played in the semi-finals. Championship side Southampton was the lowest-ranked team in the draw.

The draw was made on 5 April 2026 by Joe Cole and Jermaine Beckford, and took place at London Stadium, Stratford, following the quarter-final match between West Ham United and Leeds United.

Number of teams per tier still in competition
Premier League	Championship	League One	League Two	Non-League	Total
3 / 20	1 / 24	0 / 24	0 / 24	0 / 32	4 / 124

25 April 2026	Manchester City (1)	2–1	Southampton (2)	Wembley
17:15 BST	Doku 82'; González 87'	Report	Azaz 79'	Stadium: Wembley Stadium; Attendance: 70,053; Referee: Craig Pawson

26 April 2026	Chelsea (1)	1–0	Leeds United (1)	Wembley
15:00 BST	Fernández 23'	Report		Stadium: Wembley Stadium; Attendance: 82,542; Referee: Jarred Gillett

== Final ==
Number of teams per tier still in competition
Premier League	Championship	League One	League Two	Non-League	Total
2 / 20	0 / 24	0 / 24	0 / 24	0 / 32	2 / 124

16 May 2026
15:00 BST

Chelsea	0–1	Manchester City
	Report	Semenyo 72'

Wembley Stadium, London
Attendance: 83,337
Referee: Darren England (South Yorkshire)

== Top goalscorers ==
Rank	Player	Club	Goals
1	(Saint Kitts and Nevis) Tyrese Shade	Burton Albion	5
2	(England) Danny Elliott	Macclesfield	4
2	(England) Ashley Fletcher	Blackpool	4
2	(Brazil) Gabriel Martinelli	Arsenal	4
2	(Portugal) Pedro Neto	Chelsea	4
6	14 players		3

== Television rights ==
2025–26 marks the start of a new four-year television deal, replacing a previous one in which rights were split between the BBC and ITV. Broadcast rights were won by TNT Sports, with a guarantee of free-to-air matches being obtained by an agreement to show 14 matches on the BBC.

Broadcaster	Summary
BBC Sport	14 live matches per season, all to be shared with TNT Sports. BBC Sport has two matches per round up to and including the quarter-finals, plus one semi-final and the final.
TNT Sports	Selected matches from the first and second round, and all matches from the third round onwards (including those on the BBC) which do not kick off at 3 pm on a Saturday.

Round	Date	Fixture	Kick-off	Channels	
Round	Date	Fixture	Kick-off	TV	Digital
First round	31 October 2025	Luton Town v Forest Green Rovers	19:30	TNT Sports 1	Discovery+
First round	1 November 2025	Chelmsford City v Braintree Town	12:00	TNT Sports 1 TNT Sports 3	Discovery+
First round	1 November 2025	Brackley Town v Notts County	17:30	BBC Two; TNT Sports 3	BBC iPlayer; Discovery+
First round	2 November 2025	South Shields v Shrewsbury Town	12:00	TNT Sports 1	Discovery+
First round	2 November 2025	Eastleigh v Walsall	14:15	BBC Two; TNT Sports 2	BBC iPlayer; Discovery+
First round	2 November 2025	Port Vale v Maldon & Tiptree	15:00	TNT Sports 1	Discovery+
First round	2 November 2025	Gainsborough Trinity v Accrington Stanley	17:15	TNT Sports 1 TNT Sports 2	Discovery+
First round	3 November 2025	Tamworth v Leyton Orient	19:30	TNT Sports 1	Discovery+
Second round	5 December 2025	Salford City v Leyton Orient	19:30	TNT Sports 1	Discovery+
Second round	6 December 2025	Sutton United v Shrewsbury Town	17:15	BBC Two; TNT Sports 2	BBC iPlayer; Discovery+
Second round	6 December 2025	Chesterfield v Doncaster Rovers	19:30	TNT Sports 1	Discovery+
Second round	7 December 2025	Slough Town v Macclesfield	12:30	TNT Sports 2	Discovery+
Second round	7 December 2025	Boreham Wood v Newport County	14:30	BBC Two; TNT Sports 1	BBC iPlayer
Second round	7 December 2025	Gateshead v Walsall	15:30	TNT Sports 2	Discovery+
Second round	7 December 2025	Blackpool v Carlisle United	17:30	TNT Sports 1	Discovery+
Second round	8 December 2025	Brackley Town v Burton Albion	19:30	TNT Sports 1	Discovery+
Third round	9 January 2026	Wrexham v Nottingham Forest	19:30	TNT Sports 1	Discovery+
Third round	10 January 2026	Macclesfield v Crystal Palace	12:15	BBC One; TNT Sports 1	BBC iPlayer; Discovery+
Third round	10 January 2026	Tottenham Hotspur v Aston Villa	17:45	BBC One; TNT Sports 1	BBC iPlayer; Discovery+
Third round	10 January 2026	Grimsby Town v Weston-super-Mare	17:45	TNT Sports 5	Discovery+
Third round	10 January 2026	Charlton Athletic v Chelsea	20:00	TNT Sports 1	Discovery+
Third round	11 January 2026	Derby County v Leeds United	12:00	TNT Sports 2	Discovery+
Third round	11 January 2026	Portsmouth v Arsenal	14:00	TNT Sports 1	Discovery+
Third round	11 January 2026	Manchester United v Brighton & Hove Albion	16:30	TNT Sports 1	Discovery+
Third round	12 January 2026	Liverpool v Barnsley	19:45	TNT Sports 1	Discovery+
Fourth round	13 February 2026	Hull City v Chelsea	19:45	BBC One; TNT Sports 1	BBC iPlayer; Discovery+
Fourth round	13 February 2026	Wrexham v Ipswich Town	19:45	BBC Wales	Discovery+
Fourth round	14 February 2026	Burton Albion v West Ham United	12:15	TNT Sports 1	Discovery+
Fourth round	14 February 2026	Aston Villa v Newcastle United	17:45	BBC One; TNT Sports 3	BBC iPlayer; Discovery+
Fourth round	14 February 2026	Liverpool v Brighton & Hove Albion	20:00	TNT Sports 1	Discovery+
Fourth round	15 February 2026	Birmingham City v Leeds United	12:00	TNT Sports 3	Discovery+
Fourth round	15 February 2026	Grimsby Town v Wolverhampton Wanderers	13:30	TNT Sports 1	Discovery+
Fourth round	15 February 2026	Arsenal v Wigan Athletic	16:30	TNT Sports 1	Discovery+
Fourth round	16 February 2026	Macclesfield v Brentford	19:30	TNT Sports 1	Discovery+
Fifth round	6 March 2026	Wolverhampton Wanderers v Liverpool	20:00	BBC One; TNT Sports 1	BBC iPlayer; Discovery+
Fifth round	7 March 2026	Mansfield Town v Arsenal	12:15	TNT Sports 1	Discovery+
Fifth round	7 March 2026	Wrexham v Chelsea	17:45	BBC One; TNT Sports 2	BBC iPlayer; Discovery+
Fifth round	7 March 2026	Newcastle United v Manchester City	20:00	TNT Sports 1	Discovery+
Fifth round	8 March 2026	Fulham v Southampton	12:00	TNT Sports 2	Discovery+
Fifth round	8 March 2026	Port Vale v Sunderland	13:30	TNT Sports 1	Discovery+
Fifth round	8 March 2026	Leeds United v Norwich City	16:30	TNT Sports 1	Discovery+
Fifth round	9 March 2026	West Ham United v Brentford	19:30	TNT Sports 1	Discovery+
Quarter-finals	4 April 2026	Manchester City v Liverpool	12:45	TNT Sports 1	HBO Max
Quarter-finals	4 April 2026	Chelsea v Port Vale	17:15	BBC One; TNT Sports 1	BBC iPlayer; HBO Max
Quarter-finals	4 April 2026	Southampton v Arsenal	20:00	BBC One; TNT Sports 1	BBC iPlayer; HBO Max
Quarter-finals	5 April 2026	West Ham United v Leeds United	16:30	TNT Sports 1	HBO Max
Semi-finals	25 April 2026	Manchester City v Southampton	17:15	BBC One; TNT Sports 1	BBC iPlayer; HBO Max
Semi-finals	26 April 2026	Chelsea v Leeds United	15:00	TNT Sports 1	HBO Max
Final	16 May 2026	Chelsea v Manchester City	15:00	BBC One; TNT Sports 1	BBC iPlayer; HBO Max
