= 2025–26 Exeter City F.C. season =

124th season in existence of Exeter City FC

Exeter City
2025–26 season
- Owner: Exeter City Supporters' Trust
- Chairman: Laurence Overend (interim)
- Manager: Gary Caldwell (until 16 February); Matt Taylor (from 3 March)
- Stadium: St James Park
- League One: 21st (relegated to League Two)
- FA Cup: Third round
- EFL Cup: First round
- EFL Trophy: Round of 32
- Top goalscorer: League: Jayden Wareham (9 goals); All: Jayden Wareham (12 goals)
- Highest home attendance: 8,262 vs. Plymouth Argyle (23 October 2025)
- Lowest home attendance: 2,152 vs. Cardiff City (16 September 2025)
- Average home league attendance: 6,739
- Biggest win: League: 4–1 vs. Blackpool (9 Aug.); 3–0 vs. Peterborough United (30 Aug.); 3–0 vs. Barnsley (20 Dec.); 3–0 vs. Stevenage (17 Jan.); Cup: 4–0 vs. Wycombe Wanderers (6 Dec.)
- Biggest defeat: League: 4–0 vs. Rotherham United (31 Jan.); 5–1 vs. Bolton Wanderers (28 Feb.); 4–0 vs. Cardiff City 14 Mar. Cup: 10–1 vs. Manchester City (10 Jan.)
Home colours	Away colours	Third colours

The 2025–26 season was the 124th season in the history of Exeter City Football Club and their fourth consecutive season in League One. The club finished 21st in the league and were relegated to League Two for the next season. In addition to the domestic league, the club also participated in the FA Cup, the EFL Cup, and the EFL Trophy.

== Managerial changes ==
On 16 February, Gary Caldwell departed as manager after one hundred and eighty matches in charge, and a 36.67% win rate, to join Wigan Athletic for a compensation sum. A fortnight later, Matt Taylor returned as manager until the end of the season, having previously been in charge between 2018 and 2022.

== Statistics ==
=== Appearances and goals ===
Players with no appearances are not included on the list; italics indicate loaned in player

No.	Pos	Nat	Player	Total		League One		FA Cup		EFL Cup		EFL Trophy	
No.	Pos	Nat	Player	Apps	Goals	Apps	Goals	Apps	Goals	Apps	Goals	Apps	Goals
1	GK	(England) ENG	Joe Whitworth	43	0	39+0	0	3+0	0	1+0	0	0+0	0
2	DF	(Scotland) SCO	Jack McMillan	46	1	39+2	1	2+0	0	0+0	0	2+1	0
3	DF	(England) ENG	Ryan Rydel	16	0	5+9	0	0+0	0	1+0	0	0+1	0
4	DF	(Wales) WAL	Ed Turns	29	1	18+5	0	1+2	0	0+0	0	2+1	1
5	DF	(England) ENG	Jack Fitzwater	34	1	29+0	1	3+0	0	0+0	0	2+0	0
6	MF	(England) ENG	Ethan Brierley	47	1	39+3	1	3+0	0	0+0	0	0+2	0
7	FW	(Guinea-Bissau) GBS	Carlos Mendes Gomes	22	1	11+10	1	0+1	0	0+0	0	0+0	0
9	FW	(England) ENG	Jayden Wareham	53	22	41+5	19	3+0	2	0+0	0	2+2	1
10	MF	(England) ENG	Jack Aitchison	50	4	25+19	1	2+1	2	0+0	0	3+0	1
11	FW	(England) ENG	Andrew Oluwabori	2	0	0+0	0	0+0	0	0+1	0	0+1	0
12	MF	(England) ENG	Reece Cole	39	7	24+11	7	2+0	0	0+0	0	1+1	0
14	DF	(Finland) FIN	Ilmari Niskanen	52	3	46+0	3	3+0	0	0+0	0	3+0	0
15	DF	(England) ENG	Johnly Yfeko	18	0	8+6	0	1+0	0	0+0	0	3+0	0
17	FW	(England) ENG	Akeel Higgins	31	2	9+18	1	2+1	1	0+0	0	0+1	0
19	FW	(England) ENG	Sonny Cox	26	1	10+14	1	0+0	0	1+0	0	0+1	0
20	DF	(England) ENG	Luca Woodhouse	37	1	22+9	1	1+0	0	1+0	0	3+1	0
21	DF	(England) ENG	Danny Andrew	25	1	17+4	0	1+0	1	0+0	0	1+2	0
23	GK	(England) ENG	Jack Bycroft	11	1	7+0	1	0+0	0	0+0	0	4+0	0
26	DF	(Republic of Ireland) IRL	Pierce Sweeney	45	2	37+3	2	2+0	0	1+0	0	2+0	0
27	FW	(Northern Ireland) NIR	Josh Magennis	43	9	14+23	7	0+3	0	1+0	0	2+0	2
28	FW	(Ukraine) UKR	Timur Tutierov	17	3	7+10	3	0+0	0	0+0	0	0+0	0
29	MF	(Scotland) SCO	Kevin McDonald	27	1	5+16	1	1+1	0	1+0	0	0+3	0
31	MF	(Republic of Ireland) IRL	Jake Doyle-Hayes	25	0	21+2	0	2+0	0	0+0	0	0+0	0
33	MF	(England) ENG	Tom Dean	10	0	1+5	0	0+0	0	1+0	0	3+0	0
34	MF	(England) ENG	Liam Oakes	24	0	11+6	0	1+1	0	0+1	0	4+0	0
37	FW	(Scotland) SCO	Kieran Wilson	12	0	0+9	0	0+0	0	0+1	0	2+0	0
40	DF	(Wales) WAL	Ed James	6	0	5+0	0	0+0	0	1+0	0	0+0	0
42	MF	(England) ENG	George Birch	5	1	0+2	0	0+1	1	1+0	0	0+1	0
45	MF	(Republic of Ireland) IRL	Charlie Cummins	14	0	8+5	0	0+0	0	0+1	0	0+0	0
Player(s) who featured but departed the club during the season:
8	MF	(England) ENG	Edward Francis	15	0	2+7	0	0+1	0	1+0	0	4+0	0
16	DF	(Netherlands) NED	Sil Swinkels	11	0	6+1	0	0+1	0	0+0	0	1+2	0

== Transfers and contracts ==
=== In ===
Date	Pos.	Player	From	Fee	Ref.
16 June 2025 (Note: The transfer was announced on 5 May, and would become official on June 16 once the transfer window has reopened)	CB	(England) Johnly Yfeko	(Scotland) Rangers	Undisclosed	
1 July 2025 (Note: The transfer was announced on 19 June, and would become official on July 1 once his contract at Wycombe had ended)	CB	(England) Luca Woodhouse	(England) Wycombe Wanderers	Free	
1 July 2025 (Note: The transfer was announced on 26 June, and would become official on July 1 once his contract at Reading had ended)	CF	(England) Jayden Wareham	(England) Reading	Compensation	
31 July 2025	GK	(England) Jack Bycroft	(England) Swindon Town	Free	
1 August 2025	CM	(Republic of Ireland) Jake Doyle-Hayes	(Republic of Ireland) Sligo Rovers	Undisclosed	
1 September 2025	LB	(England) Danny Andrew	(England) Stockport County	Free	

=== Out ===
Date	Pos.	Player	To	Fee	Ref.
26 June 2026	CF	(England) Jay Bird	(England) Salford City	Undisclosed	
10 February 2026	CDM	(England) Edward Francis	(England) Rochdale	Undisclosed	

=== Loaned in ===
Date	Pos.	Player	From	Date until	Ref.
25 June 2025	LB	(England) Ryan Rydel	(England) Stockport County	31 May 2026	
26 June 2025	CM	(England) Ethan Brierley	(England) Brentford	31 May 2026	
10 July 2025	GK	(England) Joe Whitworth	(England) Crystal Palace	31 May 2026	
17 July 2025	CB	(Netherlands) Sil Swinkels	(England) Aston Villa	4 January 2026 (Note: On 4 January, Swinkels was recalled to his parent club Aston Villa)	
1 September 2025	LW	(England) Akeel Higgins	(England) West Bromwich Albion	31 May 2026	
1 September 2025	AM	(Guinea-Bissau) Carlos Mendes Gomes	(England) Bolton Wanderers	31 May 2026	
16 January 2016	CF	(Ukraine) Timur Tutierov	(England) Sunderland	31 May 2026	

=== Loaned out ===
Date	Pos.	Player	To	Date until	Ref.
15 July 2025	GK	(England) Frankie Phillips	(England) Taunton Town	13 February 2026 (Note: On 13 February, Phillips was recalled from his initial season-long loan at Taunton Town)	
19 September 2025	RW	(England) Andrew Oluwabori	(England) Yeovil Town	3 January 2026	
10 October 2025	CM	(Republic of Ireland) Charlie Cummins	(England) Weston-super-Mare	21 February 2026 (Note: On 13 February, Cummins' loan at Weston-super-Mare was extended until the end of the season. He was then recalled on 21 February)	
31 October 2025	CAM	(England) George Birch	(England) Weston-super-Mare	3 January 2026	
7 November 2025	CB	(Wales) Ed James	(England) Chippenham Town	31 December 2025	
28 November 2025	CF	(Scotland) Kieran Wilson	(England) Torquay United	19 March 2026 (Note: On 13 January, Wilson's loan at Torquay United was extended for another month. Then on 12 February it was extended further until the end of the season. But on 19 March he was recalled to the club)	
18 December 2025	RB	(England) Louie Cayless	(England) Plymouth Parkway	15 January 2026	
10 February 2026	CB	(Wales) Ed James	(England) Torquay United	10 March 2026	
17 February 2026	GK	(England) Frankie Phillips	(England) Plymouth Parkway	31 May 2026	
19 March 2026	RM	(England) Tom Dean	(England) Truro City	31 May 2026	
19 March 2026	CF	(Scotland) Kieran Wilson	(England) Truro City	31 May 2026	
26 March 2026	CAM	(England) George Birch	(England) Chippenham Town	31 May 2026	

=== Released / Out of Contract ===
Date	Pos.	Player	Subsequent club	Join Date	Ref.
30 June 2025	AM	(England) Mitch Beardmore	(England) Bath City	1 July 2025	
30 June 2025	LB	(Kenya) Vincent Harper	(England) Walsall	1 July 2025	
30 June 2025	LB	(England) Demetri Mitchell	(England) Leyton Orient	1 July 2025	
30 June 2025	CB	(England) Ben Purrington	(England) Cambridge United	1 July 2025	
30 June 2025	AM	(Australia) Caleb Watts	(England) Plymouth Argyle	1 July 2025	
30 June 2025	LM	(England) Max Edgecombe	(England) Plymouth Parkway	3 July 2025	
30 June 2025	CM	(England) Jake Richards	(England) Luton Town	5 July 2025	
30 June 2025	CB	(England) Cheick Diabaté	(Scotland) St Johnstone	7 July 2025	
30 June 2025	CM	(England) Gabe Billington	(England) Tiverton Town	8 August 2025	
30 June 2025	GK	(England) Harry Lee	(England) Crystal Palace	15 August 2025	
30 June 2025	LW	(Wales) Pat Jones	(England) Chester	19 August 2025	
30 June 2025	GK	(England) Shaun MacDonald	(Wales) Newport County	7 October 2025	
30 June 2025	CB	(England) Angus MacDonald	(England) Barrow	5 March 2026	
30 June 2025	LW	(Suriname) Yanic Wildschut			
7 July 2025	DM	(England) Ryan Woods	(England) Oldham Athletic	7 July 2025	

=== New Contract ===
Date	Pos.	Player	Contract until	Ref.
18 June 2025	CF	(Scotland) Kieran Wilson	Undisclosed (Note: First professional contract)	
17 July 2025	CDM	(Scotland) Kevin McDonald	30 June 2026	
18 December 2025	RB	(England) Louie Cayless	30 June 2028	
10 April 2026	CM	(Republic of Ireland) Charlie Cummins	30 June 2027	
14 April 2026	CAM	(England) George Birch	30 June 2027	
16 April 2026	CB	(Wales) Ed James	30 June 2027 (Note: Club option for an additional year)	
22 April 2026	RM	(England) Tom Dean	30 June 2027	
22 April 2026	GK	(England) Frankie Phillips	30 June 2027	

== Pre-season and friendlies ==
On 11 May, Exeter City announced a testimonial for Pierce Sweeney against Swansea City, to mark his tenth season at Exeter City. Two days later, a trip to Torquay United was confirmed. A third fixture was added to the schedule against FC United of Manchester, to mark their 20th anniversary of supporter ownership. A fourth fixture was added to the schedule, against Weston-super-Mare.

Win Draw Loss Fixtures

12 July 2025 Friendly	Weston-super-Mare	0–6	Exeter City	Weston-super-Mare
13:00 BST		Report	Wareham 26'; Crees 51'; Cox 57'; Cole 67'; Wilson 84', 85'	Stadium: The Optima Stadium

18 July 2025 Friendly	Aston Villa	0–2	Exeter City	Bodymoor Heath
13:00 BST		Report	McMillan; Oakes	Stadium: Bodymoor Heath Training Ground; Attendance: 0 (behind closed doors)

19 July 2025 Friendly	FC United of Manchester	1–4	Exeter City	Moston
15:00 BST	Fitzmartin 51'	Report	Cole 3'; Brierley 6'; Jones 71'; Cox 75'	Stadium: Broadhurst Park; Attendance: 904

25 July 2025 Friendly	Torquay United	1–1	Exeter City	Torquay
19:30 BST	Young 88'	Report	Wareham 52'	Stadium: Plainmoor; Attendance: 3,121; Referee: Jonty Bolland

26 July 2025 Pierce Sweeney testimonial	Exeter City	1–0	Swansea City	Exeter
13:00 BST	Cox 46'	Report		Stadium: St James Park; Attendance: 3,948 (626 away)

== Competitions ==
=== Overall record ===
Competition	First match	Last match	Starting round	Final position	Record							
Competition	First match	Last match	Starting round	Final position	Pld	W	D	L	GF	GA	GD	Win %
League One	2 August 2025	2 May 2026	Matchday 1	21st	46	12	13	21	52	61	−9	26.09
FA Cup	1 November 2025	10 January 2025	First round	Third round	3	2	0	1	7	10	−3	66.67
EFL Cup	13 August 2025	13 August 2025	First round	First round	1	0	0	1	0	2	−2	0.00
EFL Trophy	16 September 2025	2 December 2025	Group stage	Round of 32	4	2	0	2	5	8	−3	50.00
Total					54	16	13	25	64	81	−17	29.63

Last updated: 2 May 2026

=== League One ===
==== League table ====
Pos	Team	Pld	W	D	L	GF	GA	GD	Pts	Promotion, qualification or relegation
19	AFC Wimbledon	46	15	8	23	51	72	−21	53	
20	Leyton Orient	46	14	10	22	59	71	−12	52	
21	Exeter City (R)	46	12	13	21	52	61	−9	49	Relegation to EFL League Two
22	Port Vale (R)	46	10	12	24	36	61	−25	42	Relegation to EFL League Two
23	Rotherham United (R)	46	10	11	25	41	71	−30	41	Relegation to EFL League Two

Source: EFL Official Website
Rules for classification: 1) Points; 2) Goal difference; 3) Number of goals scored; 4) Head-to-head results; 5) Wins; 6) Away goals; 7) Penalty points (sec 9.5); 8) 12-point sending off offences
(R) Relegated

==== Results summary ====
Overall								Home						Away					
Pld	W	D	L	GF	GA	GD	Pts	W	D	L	GF	GA	GD	W	D	L	GF	GA	GD
46	12	13	21	52	61	−9	49	8	7	8	30	29	+1	4	6	13	22	32	−10

Last updated: complete.
Source: Soccerway

==== Results by round ====
Round	1	2	3	4	5	6	7	8	9	10	11	12	13	14	15	16	18	19	20	21	22	23	24	25	27	28	29	30	31	32	33	34	35	17^{1}	36	26^{2}	37	38	39	40	41	42	43	44	45	46
Ground	A	H	H	A	A	H	A	H	A	H	A	H	A	H	H	A	A	H	A	H	A	A	H	A	H	A	A	H	A	H	H	A	H	H	A	H	H	A	A	H	A	H	A	H	A	H
Result	L	W	L	W	L	W	L	L	L	L	W	D	L	W	D	L	L	W	L	W	L	W	W	D	W	W	D	L	D	D	D	D	L	D	L	L	L	L	L	D	L	W	D	D	D	L
Position	20	9	15	11	14	11	13	16	16	18	17	16	19	18	19	20	20	20	22	20	22	20	15	14	13	10	11	13	13	14	14	14	15	15	15	16	18	19	20	21	21	21	21	21	21	21
Points	0	3	3	6	6	9	9	9	9	9	12	13	13	16	17	17	17	20	20	23	23	26	29	30	33	36	37	37	38	39	40	41	41	42	42	42	42	42	42	43	43	46	47	48	49	49

Source: Soccerway
A = Away; H = Home; W = Win; D = Draw; L = Loss; P = Postponed
Notes:
- ^{1} Matchday 17 (vs Burton Albion) was postponed following discussions with the Safety Advisory Group, following a recent fire causing significant damage to the stadium.
- ^{2} Matchday 26 (vs Lincoln City) was postponed due to FA Cup involvements.

==== Matches ====
On 26 June, the League One fixtures were announced.

Win Draw Loss Fixtures

2 August 2025 1	Doncaster Rovers	1–0	Exeter City	Doncaster
15:00 BST	Molyneux 88' (pen.)	Report		Stadium: Eco-Power Stadium; Attendance: 8,688 (630 away); Referee: Ross Joyce

9 August 2025 2	Exeter City	4–1	Blackpool	Exeter
15:00 BST	Cole 4'; Fitzwater 15'; Wareham 60'; McMillan (yellow card) 83'; Cox 90'	Report	Fletcher 22'; Ihiekwe (yellow card) 60'	Stadium: St James Park; Attendance: 6,852 (548 away); Referee: Carl Brook

16 August 2025 3	Exeter City	1–2	Mansfield Town	Exeter
12:30 BST	Fitzwater (yellow card) 46'; Swinkels (yellow card) 71'; Magennis 76' (pen.)	Report	Blake-Tracy 42', (yellow card) 78'; Evans 86'	Stadium: St James Park; Attendance: 6,166 (655 away); Referee: Ollie Yates
Note: Fixture was originally scheduled for a 15:00 kick-off, but was moved for live Sky Sports broadcasting.

19 August 2025 4	Wycombe Wanderers	0–1	Exeter City	Wycombe
19:45 BST	Lowry (yellow card) 35'; Leahy (yellow card) 45+1'; Grimmer (yellow card) 85'; Allen (yellow card) 86'	Report	Dean (yellow card) 4'; Niskanen (yellow card) 27'; Fitzwater (yellow card) 67'; Grimmer 83' (o.g.)	Stadium: Adams Park; Attendance: 4,661 (372 away); Referee: Ben Atkinson

23 August 2025 5	Northampton Town	2–0	Exeter City	Northampton (Sixfields)
15:00 BST	Wheatley 1'; Dyche 16'	Report	Cox (yellow card) 43'; Doyle-Hayes (yellow card) 77'; Turns (yellow card) 79'; Magennis (yellow card) 90+3'	Stadium: Sixfields Stadium; Attendance: 5,739 (393 away); Referee: Edward Duckworth

30 August 2025 6	Exeter City	3–0	Peterborough United	Exeter
15:00 BST	Wareham 31'; Doyle-Hayes (yellow card) 49'; Aitchison (yellow card) 64'; Magennis 65', 68'; Fitzwater (yellow card) 80'	Report	Nevett (yellow card) 9'; Garbett (yellow card) 45+1'	Stadium: St James Park; Attendance: 6,239 (392 away); Referee: Matthew Corlett

6 September 2025 7	Rotherham United	1–0	Exeter City	Rotherham
15:00 BST	Hall 39'; Baptiste (yellow card) 90+3'	Report		Stadium: New York Stadium; Attendance: 7,699 (380 away); Referee: Martin Woods

13 September 2025 8	Exeter City	0–2	Port Vale	Exeter
15:00 BST	Doyle-Hayes (yellow card) 56'	Report	Paton 4'; Humphreys (yellow card) 12'; Cole 45'; Gordon (yellow card) 79'	Stadium: St James Park; Attendance: 6,221 (460 away); Referee: Matthew Russell

20 September 2025 9	Stevenage	2–1	Exeter City	Stevenage
15:00 BST	White 5'; Roberts 80', (yellow card) 81'	Report	Magennis 27'; Wareham (yellow card) 38'	Stadium: Broadhall Way; Attendance: 4,129 (368 away); Referee: Craig Hicks

27 September 2025 10	Exeter City	0–1	Huddersfield Town	Exeter
15:00 BST	Cole (yellow card) 16'; Niskanen (yellow card) 39'; Fitzwater (yellow card) 72'	Report	Castledine 28'; Harness (yellow card) 53'	Stadium: St James Park; Attendance: 6,477 (545 away); Referee: David Rock

4 October 2025 11	Lincoln City	0–1	Exeter City	Lincoln
15:00 BST		Report	Whitworth (yellow card) 15'; McDonald 90+4'; Brierley (yellow card) 90+11'	Stadium: Sincil Bank; Attendance: 9,053 (251 away); Referee: Andrew Humphries

11 October 2025 12	Exeter City	1–1	Reading	Exeter
15:00 BST	Wareham 11', (yellow card) 90+4'	Report	Marriott 6'; Ritchie (yellow card) 56'	Stadium: St James Park; Attendance: 7,361 (1,001 away); Referee: James Durkin

18 October 2025 13	Stockport County	1–0	Exeter City	Stockport (Edgeley)
15:00 BST	Lowe 24'; Norwood (yellow card) 69'	Report	Cole (yellow card) 20'	Stadium: Edgeley Park; Attendance: 9,190 (504 away); Referee: Aaron Bannister

23 October 2025 14	Exeter City	2–0	Plymouth Argyle	Exeter
20:00 BST	Cole 18'; Sweeney (yellow card) 28'; Andrew (yellow card) 40'; Higgins 58'; McMillan (yellow card) 76'	Report	Sorinola (yellow card) 78'; Oseni (yellow card) 87'	Stadium: St James Park; Attendance: 8,262 (1,132 away); Referee: Alex Chilowicz
Note: Fixture was originally scheduled for a 12:30 kick-off on Saturday 25th October, but was moved for live Sky Sports broadcasting.

8 November 2025 15	Exeter City	1–1	Wigan Athletic	Exeter
15:00 GMT	Wareham (yellow card) 31', (goal) 53'	Report	Wright 24'; Smith (yellow card) 64'	Stadium: St James Park; Attendance: 6,585 (286 away); Referee: Stephen Parkinson

15 November 2025 16	Leyton Orient	2–1	Exeter City	London (Leyton)
15:00 GMT	Simpson (yellow card) 13'; Clare (yellow card) 44'; El Mizouni 76'; Bakinson 81'; Abdulai (yellow card) 90+2'	Report	Sweeney (yellow card) 16'; Wareham 38' (pen.); Brierley (yellow card) 46'	Stadium: Brisbane Road; Attendance: 8,519 (1,041 away); Referee: Ruebyn Ricardo

29 November 2025 18	Bradford City	1–0	Exeter City	Bradford
15:00 GMT	Wright 20'; Power (yellow card) 30'; Pointon (yellow card) 76'; Walker (yellow card) 89'	Report	Sweeney (yellow card) 57'; Wareham (yellow card) 88'	Stadium: Valley Parade; Attendance: 19,713 (464 away); Referee: Richard Eley

9 December 2025 19	Exeter City	1–0	AFC Wimbledon	Exeter
19:45 GMT	Fitzwater (yellow card) 44'; Yfeko (yellow card) 68'; McMillan 80'	Report		Stadium: St James Park; Attendance: 5,579 (435 away); Referee: Will Finnie

13 December 2025 20	Bolton Wanderers	2–1	Exeter City	Bolton (Horwich)
15:00 GMT	Dalby 70'; Gale 82'	Report	Aitchison 20'; Niskanen (yellow card) 73'; Swinkels (yellow card) 78'; Doyle-Hayes (yellow card) 80'; Sweeney (yellow card) 89'	Stadium: Toughsheet Community Stadium; Attendance: 20,622 (335 away); Referee: Benjamin Speedie

20 December 2025 21	Exeter City	3–0	Barnsley	Exeter
15:00 GMT	Niskanen 41'; Sweeney (yellow card) 45+2'; Wareham 61'; Cole 73'	Report	Kelly (yellow card) 54'; Keillor-Dunn (yellow card) 77'	Stadium: St James Park; Attendance: 6,471 (386 away); Referee: Ben Atkinson

26 December 2025 22	Cardiff City	1–0	Exeter City	Cardiff (Leckwith)
15:00 GMT	Robertson 53'; Davies (yellow card) 56'; Bagan (yellow card) 87'; Chambers (yellow card) 89'	Report	Oakes (yellow card) 82'	Stadium: Cardiff City Stadium; Attendance: 22,291 (1,500 away); Referee: Tom Reeves

29 December 2025 23	AFC Wimbledon	0–1	Exeter City	London (Wimbledon)
19:45 GMT	Seddon (yellow card) 90+8'; Hippolyte (yellow card) 90+9'; Bishop (yellow card) 90+11'	Report	Wareham 37'; McMillan (yellow card) 62'; Doyle-Hayes (yellow card) 68'; Whitworth (yellow card) 90+1'; Aitchison (yellow card) 90+9'	Stadium: Plough Lane; Attendance: 8,621 (921 away); Referee: Jacob Miles

1 January 2026 24	Exeter City	1–0	Luton Town	Exeter
15:00 GMT	Doyle-Hayes (yellow card) 25'; Cox (yellow card) 29'; Sweeney 50'; Brierley (yellow card) 78'	Report	Brown (yellow card) 67'	Stadium: St James Park; Attendance: 7,912 (996 away); Referee: Matthew Russell

4 January 2026 25	Huddersfield Town	2–2	Exeter City	Huddersfield
15:00 GMT	Harness 18'; Radulović 43'; May (yellow card) 85'	Report	Cole 20'; Wareham 89', (yellow card) 90+3'	Stadium: Kirklees Stadium; Attendance: 16,071 (211 away); Referee: Abigail Byrne

17 January 2026 27	Exeter City	3–0	Stevenage	Exeter
15:00 GMT	Wareham 49' (pen.); Brierley 73'; Doyle-Hayes (yellow card) 90+2'; Whitworth (yellow card) 90+4'; Tutierov 90+8'	Report	Patterson (yellow card) 88'; Goode (yellow card) 90+3'	Stadium: St James Park; Attendance: 6,302 (187 away); Referee: Martin Woods

24 January 2026 28	Port Vale	1–3	Exeter City	Stoke (Burslem)
15:00 GMT	Ojo (yellow card) 28'; Humphreys 75'	Report	Mendes Gomes 22'; Wareham 47'; Tutierov 59'; Aitchison (yellow card) 75'; Whitworth (yellow card) 89'; Cox (yellow card) 90+2'; Magennis (yellow card) 90+7'	Stadium: Vale Park; Attendance: 8,432 (383 away); Referee: Andrew Humphries

27 January 2026 29	Reading	2–2	Exeter City	Reading
20:00 GMT	Keane 45+1'; Dorsett (yellow card) 69'; O'Connor 75', (yellow card) 78'; Roberts (yellow card) 79'; Nyambe (yellow card) 90+6'	Report	Sweeney 14'; Woodhouse (yellow card) 74', (goal) 90+3'; Tutierov (yellow card) 90+11'	Stadium: Madejski Stadium; Attendance: 8,404 (548 away); Referee: Charles Breakspear

31 January 2026 30	Exeter City	0–4	Rotherham United	Exeter
15:00 GMT	Brierley (yellow card) 24'; Magennis (yellow card) 83'; Niskanen (yellow card) 86'	Report	Baptiste 28'; Rafferty 71'; Gray 72'; McWilliams 75'; Martha (yellow card) 90+7'	Stadium: St James Park; Attendance: 7,171 (282 away); Referee: Paul Howard

7 February 2026 31	Mansfield Town	0–0	Exeter City	Mansfield
15:00 GMT	Oshilaja (yellow card) 20'	Report	Turns (yellow card) 62'; Sweeney (yellow card) 70'; Oakes (yellow card) 77'; Magennis (yellow card) 88'	Stadium: Field Mill; Attendance: 7,579 (291 away); Referee: Simon Mather

14 February 2026 32	Exeter City	0–0	Northampton Town	Exeter
15:00 GMT		Report	Campbell (yellow card) 68'	Stadium: St James Park; Attendance: 6,310; Referee: Oliver Mackey

17 February 2026 33	Exeter City	1–1	Wycombe Wanderers	Exeter
19:45 GMT	Wareham 90+1'	Report	Onyedinma 22'; Henderson (yellow card) 45'; Harris (yellow card) 69'	Stadium: St James Park; Attendance: 6,188; Referee: Gavin Ward

21 February 2026 34	Peterborough United	3–3	Exeter City	Peterborough
15:00 GMT	Sykut 19'; Leonard 60', 79'	Report	Cox (yellow card) 6'; Sweeney (yellow card) 24'; Wareham 46', 52', 54', (yellow card) 65'; Aitchison (yellow card) 90+4'	Stadium: London Road Stadium; Attendance: 7,341 (334 Grecians); Referee: Elliott Swallow

28 February 2026 35	Exeter City	1–5	Bolton Wanderers	Exeter
15:00 GMT	Fitzwater (yellow card) 39'; Magennis (yellow card) 45+2'; Wareham 67'	Report	Dalby 21'; Johnston (yellow card) 35', (goal) 90+4'; Kenny 60'; Gale 72'; Cissoko 77'	Stadium: St James Park; Attendance: 7,341; Referee: Craig Hicks

3 March 2026 17	Exeter City	1–1	Burton Albion	Exeter
19:45 GMT	Wareham (yellow card) 43'; Magennis 73'	Report	Godwin-Malife 64'; McKiernan (yellow card) 74'; Evans (yellow card) 87'	Stadium: St James Park; Attendance: 5,221; Referee: Paul Howard
Note: Fixture was originally scheduled for 22 November, but was postponed following discussions with the Safety Advisory Group, following a recent fire causing significant damage to the stadium.

7 March 2026 36	Barnsley	2–1	Exeter City	Barnsley
15:00 GMT	McGoldrick 8'; Yoganathan 16'; Shepherd (yellow card) 29'	Report	Rydel (yellow card) 23'; Wareham 75'	Stadium: Oakwell; Attendance: 9,706 (387 Grecians); Referee: Ross Joyce

10 March 2026 26	Exeter City	0–1	Lincoln City	Exeter
19:45 GMT	Bycroft (yellow card) 45+4'	Report	Hamer 32'; Darikwa (yellow card) 36'; Bayliss (yellow card) 77'	Stadium: St James Park; Attendance: 5,142 (inc. 399 from Lincoln); Referee: Carl Brook
Note: Fixture was initially scheduled for 10 January, but was postponed due to Exeter City’s FA Cup involvement.

14 March 2026 37	Exeter City	0–4	Cardiff City	Exeter
15:00 GMT		Report	Colwill 31', 34'; Robertson 67'; Robinson 86'	Stadium: St James Park; Attendance: 7,180; Referee: Benjamin Speedie

17 March 2026 38	Luton Town	3–2	Exeter City	Luton
19:45 GMT	Palmer 13'; Clark 29' (pen.); Odoffin 45+5'; Lawrence (yellow card) 72'	Report	Cole 25', (yellow card) 45+4'; Niskanen 49'; McMillan (yellow card) 82'	Stadium: Kenilworth Road; Attendance: 9,216 (471 Grecians); Referee: Alex Chilowicz

21 March 2026 39	Wigan Athletic	2–0	Exeter City	Wigan
15:00 GMT	Taylor 5'; Murray 85'; Borges Rodrigues (yellow card) 90+1'	Report	Yfeko (yellow card) 29'; McMillan (yellow card) 69'; Andrew (yellow card) 90+1'	Stadium: Brick Community Stadium; Attendance: 9,506 (420 Grecians); Referee: Edward Duckworth

28 March 2026 40	Exeter City	0–0	Leyton Orient	Exeter
15:00 GMT	McMillan (yellow card) 81'; Aitchison (yellow card) 90+1'	Report	Happe (yellow card) 49'; Archibald (yellow card) 83'; Forrester (yellow card) 90+2'	Stadium: St James Park; Attendance: 6,772; Referee: Tim Robinson

3 April 2026 41	Blackpool	1–0	Exeter City	Blackpool
15:00 BST	Bloxham 29'; Honeyman (yellow card) 72'	Report	Niskanen (yellow card) 80'	Stadium: Bloomfield Road; Attendance: 10,950; Referee: Neil Hair

6 April 2026 42	Exeter City	3–0	Doncaster Rovers	Exeter
15:00 BST	Wareham (yellow card) 20', (goal) 42', 84'; Magennis 69'	Report		Stadium: St James Park; Attendance: 6,638; Referee: Alan Dale

11 April 2026 42	Plymouth Argyle	2–2	Exeter City	Plymouth
12:30 BST	Edwards (yellow card) 15'; Watts (yellow card) 62'; Tolaj 79'; Boateng 90'	Report	Cole 47'; McDonald (yellow card) 62'; Bycroft (yellow card) 63'; Mendes (yellow card) 66'; Niskanen (yellow card) 74'; Wareham 87'	Stadium: Home Park; Attendance: 17,016 (1,748 away); Referee: Matt Corlett
Note: Fixture was initially scheduled for a 15:00 kick-off, but was brought forward following advice from local authorities.

18 April 2026 44	Exeter City	3–3	Stockport County	Exeter
15:00 BST	Cole 35'; Tutierov 70'; Bycroft 90+6'	Report	Mothersille 9'; Edun (yellow card) 16'; Stokes 29'; Bailey 77'	Stadium: St James Park; Attendance: 6,653 (491 away); Referee: Kirsty Dowle

25 April 2026 45	Burton Albion	1–1	Exeter City	Burton upon Trent
15:00 BST	Moon 61'	Report	Niskanen 14'; Woodhouse (yellow card) 88'	Stadium: Pirelli Stadium; Attendance: 5,729 (inc. 1,447 away supporters); Referee: Elliot Bell

2 May 2026 46	Exeter City	1–2	Bradford City	Exeter
15:00 BST	James (yellow card) 15'; Andrew (yellow card) 43'; Rydel (yellow card) 86'; Magennis 90+3'	Report	Jackson 27'; Power (yellow card) 51'; Sarcevic 79'	Stadium: St James Park; Attendance: 8,015 (inc. 1,330 away supporters); Referee: Oliver Yates

=== FA Cup ===
Exeter were drawn away to FC Halifax Town in the first round, at home to Wycombe Wanderers in the second round and away to Manchester City in the third round.

Win Draw Loss Fixtures

1 November 2025 First round	FC Halifax Town	0–2	Exeter City	Halifax
15:00 GMT		Report	Andrew 2'; Wareham 45+4'; Sweeney (yellow card) 72'; Brierley (yellow card) 78'	Stadium: The Shay; Attendance: 1,994 (310 away); Referee: Andrew Miller

6 December 2025 Second round	Exeter City	4–0	Wycombe Wanderers	Exeter
15:00 GMT	Yfeko (yellow card) 19'; Aitchison 39', 59', (yellow card) 63'; Sweeney (yellow card) 52'; Higgins 80'; Wareham 90+7'	Report	Grimmer (yellow card) 20'	Stadium: St James Park; Attendance: 5,161 (390 away); Referee: James Durkin

10 January 2026 Third round	Manchester City	10–1	Exeter City	Manchester
15:00 GMT	Alleyne 12'; Rodri 24'; Doyle-Hayes 42' (o.g.); Fitzwater 45+2' (o.g.); Lewis 49', 90+1'; Semenyo 54'; Reijnders 71'; O'Reilly 79'; McAidoo 86'	Report	Woodhouse (yellow card) 81'; Birch 90'	Stadium: City of Manchester Stadium; Attendance: 50,705 (7,800 away); Referee: Adam Herczeg

=== EFL Cup ===
On 26 June, the draw for the first round was made, with Exeter being drawn away against Cheltenham Town.

Win Draw Loss Fixtures

13 August 2025 First round	Cheltenham Town	2–0	Exeter City	Cheltenham
19:45 BST	Wilson 28'; Mažionis (yellow card) 34'; Archer (yellow card) 40'; Broom 55'; Willcox (yellow card) 89'	Report	Francis (yellow card) 15'; James (yellow card) 16'; McDonald (yellow card) 52'; Cummins (yellow card) 83'	Stadium: Whaddon Road; Attendance: 2,109; Referee: Alan Young

=== EFL Trophy ===
Exeter were drawn against Cardiff City, Newport County and Arsenal U21 in the group stage.

Pos	Div	Team	Pld	W	PW	PL	L	GF	GA	GD	Pts	Qualification
1	L1	Cardiff City	3	2	0	0	1	4	2	+2	6	Advance to Round 2
2	L1	Exeter City	3	2	0	0	1	5	4	+1	6	Advance to Round 2
3	L2	Newport County	3	1	0	0	2	2	3	−1	3	
4	ACA	Arsenal U21	3	1	0	0	2	6	8	−2	3	

Source: EFL

Win Draw Loss Fixtures

16 September 2025 Sou. Group A	Exeter City	0–1	Cardiff City	Exeter
19:00 BST	Fitzwater (yellow card) 86'; Sweeney (yellow card) 89'	Report	Robinson 55'; Kpakio (yellow card) 74'; Ashford (yellow card) 89' (yellow-red card) 90+5'; Turnbull (yellow card) 90+4'	Stadium: St James Park; Attendance: 2,152 (562 away); Referee: Rob Massey-Ellis

28 October 2025 Sou. Group A	Exeter City	4–3	Arsenal U21	Exeter
19:00 GMT	Magennis 50', 76'; Aitchison 64'; Wareham 87'	Report	Sagoe Jr 16'; Dudziak 54'; Kamara 74'	Stadium: St James Park; Attendance: 3,606 (739 away); Referee: Sam Mulhall

11 November 2025 Sou. Group A	Newport County	0–1	Exeter City	Newport
19:00 GMT	Whitmore (yellow card) 32'; Pugh (yellow card) 77'; Evans (yellow card) 89'	Report	Turns 50'; Francis (yellow card) 82'	Stadium: Rodney Parade; Attendance: 838 (149 away); Referee: Scott Jackson

==== Knockout stages ====
After finishing second in the group stages, City were drawn away to Luton Town in the round of 32.

2 December 2025 Round of 32	Luton Town	4–0	Exeter City	Luton
19:00 GMT	Nordås 13', 40'; Morris 34'; Nelson 67'; Lorentzen-Jones (yellow card) 90+3'	Report	Fitzwater (yellow card) 39'; Dean (yellow card) 52'; Niskanen (yellow card) 71'; Francis (yellow card) 72'; Wareham (yellow card) 84'	Stadium: Kenilworth Road; Attendance: 2,233 (136 away); Referee: Kirsty Dowle
