= Jack Bycroft =

English footballer (born 2001)

Personal information
- Full name: Jack Thomas Bycroft
- Date of birth: 21 September 2001 (age 25)
- Place of birth: Salisbury, England
- Height: 1.84 m (6 ft 0 in)
- Position: Goalkeeper

Team information
- Current team: Exeter City
- Number: 1

Youth career
- –2020: Southampton

Senior career*
| Years | Team | Apps | (Gls) |
| 2020–2024 | Southampton | 0 | (0) |
| 2020–2021 | → Weymouth (loan) | 14 | (0) |
| 2022 | → Dorchester Town (loan) | 17 | (0) |
| 2022–2023 | → Taunton Town (loan) | 40 | (0) |
| 2023 | → Aldershot Town (loan) | 3 | (0) |
| 2023–2024 | → Oxford City (loan) | 10 | (0) |
| 2024–2025 | Swindon Town | 40 | (0) |
| 2025– | Exeter City | 23 | (1) |

International career
| 2019 | England U19 | 1 | (0) |
- * Club domestic league appearances and goals as of 14:24, 22 November 2026 (UTC)

Jack Thomas Bycroft (born 21 September 2001) is an English professional footballer who plays as a goalkeeper for EFL League Two club Exeter City.

== Club career ==
Born in Salisbury, Bycroft began his career at Southampton, turning professional in 2018. He spent loan spells with non-league clubs Weymouth, Dorchester Town, Taunton Town, Aldershot Town, and Oxford City.

In January 2024 he signed for Swindon Town. He was offered a new contract by Swindon at the end of the 2024–25 season.

=== Exeter City ===
In July 2025 he signed for Exeter City on a 2-year deal. Having been second-choice goalkeeper for the majority of the 2025–26 season, a season-ending injury to Joe Whitworth in March 2026 saw him promoted to first-choice. On 18 April 2026, he scored a 96th minute equaliser in a 3–3 draw with Stockport County to earn the Grecians a vital point in their fight against relegation.

== International career ==
Bycroft has played for England U19s, appearing as a substitute in a friendly against France in October 2019.
