= Kieran Wilson =

Scottish footballer (born 2007)

Personal information
- Full name: Kieran Wilson
- Date of birth: 23 March 2007 (age 19)
- Height: 1.98 m (6 ft 6 in)
- Position: Forward

Team information
- Current team: Hull City

Youth career
- Livingston
- Airdrieonians
- 2023–2025: Exeter City

Senior career*
Years	Team	Apps	(Gls)
2024–2026	Exeter City	9	(0)
2025	→ Plymouth Parkway (loan)	3	(1)
2025–2026	→ Torquay United (loan)	17	(3)
2026	→ Truro City (loan)	7	(2)
2026–	Hull City	0	(0)
- * Club domestic league appearances and goals as of 09:41, 20 July 2026 (UTC)

Kieran Wilson (born 23 March 2007) is a Scottish professional footballer who plays as a forward for Premier League club Hull City.

== Career ==
=== Exeter City ===
Having spent time in the academy of both Livingston and Airdrieonians, Wilson joined Exeter City on an academy scholarship in 2023, following a recommendation from former first-team player Alan Gow.

On 24 September 2024, he made his professional debut from the bench in a 2–0 EFL Trophy victory over Tottenham Hotspur U21.

In June 2025, he signed a first professional contract. Ahead of the 2025–26 season, he regularly featured for the first team in pre-season friendlies, going on to make his league debut on the opening day of the season as a late substitute in a 1–0 defeat to Doncaster Rovers.

On 28 November 2025, Wilson joined National League South club Torquay United on loan initially until 12 January 2026, later extended until the end of the season. In March 2026, he was recalled from his loan to allow him to join National League club Truro City on loan for the remainder of the season.

=== Hull City ===
On 1 September 2026, Wilson joined Hull City for an undisclosed fee on transfer deadline day on a three-year contract.

== Career statistics ==
As of match played 15 November 2025

Appearances and goals by club, season and competition
Club	Season	League			FA Cup		League Cup		Other		Total	
Club	Season	Division	Apps	Goals	Apps	Goals	Apps	Goals	Apps	Goals	Apps	Goals
Exeter City	2024–25	League One	0	0	0	0	0	0	1 (Note: Appearance(s) in EFL Trophy)	0	1	0
Exeter City	2025–26	League One	9	0	0	0	1	0	2	0	12	0
Exeter City	Total		9	0	0	0	1	0	3	0	13	0
Plymouth Parkway (loan)	2024–25	Southern League Premier Division South	3	1	0	0	—		0	0	3	1
Career total			12	1	0	0	1	0	3	0	16	1
