= Jack Fitzwater =

English footballer (born 1997)

Personal information
- Full name: Jack Joseph Fitzwater
- Date of birth: 23 September 1997 (age 29)
- Place of birth: Solihull, England
- Height: 1.88 m (6 ft 2 in)
- Position: Defender

Team information
- Current team: Exeter City
- Number: 5

Youth career
- –2015: West Bromwich Albion

Senior career*
Years	Team	Apps	(Gls)
2015–2020	West Bromwich Albion	0	(0)
2015–2016	→ Chesterfield (loan)	1	(0)
2016	→ Hednesford Town (loan)	16	(1)
2017–2018	→ Forest Green Rovers (loan)	19	(1)
2018	→ Walsall (loan)	16	(3)
2018–2019	→ Walsall (loan)	19	(0)
2019	→ Walsall (loan)	2	(0)
2020–2023	Livingston	86	(5)
2023–	Exeter City	49	(2)
- * Club domestic league appearances and goals as of 28 April 2026 (UTC)

Jack Joseph Fitzwater (born 23 September 1997) is an English professional footballer who plays as a defender for EFL League Two club Exeter City.

== Club career ==
Fitzwater is a product of the West Bromwich Albion academy and was named academy player of the year for the 2014–15 season.

On 11 September 2015, Fitzwater signed on loan for Chesterfield for one month. He made his Football League debut for Chesterfield on 12 September 2015, coming on as a 19th-minute substitute for Gboly Ariyibi against Colchester United at the Proact Stadium. This turned out to be his only appearance for the club and he returned to West Bromwich Albion on 9 October after his loan expired.

On 22 July 2017, Fitzwater signed for League Two club Forest Green Rovers on loan until January 2018.

On 31 January 2018, Fitzwater signed on loan for League One club Walsall.

Upon his return to West Bromwich Albion, Fitzwater signed a new two-year contract in June 2018.

He returned on loan to Walsall for a second spell in 2018, and was recalled by West Bromwich Albion on 3 January 2019. He returned for a third loan spell at Walsall on 31 January 2019.

After being released by West Brom, Fitzwater joined Scottish Premiership club Livingston on 8 July 2020. Fitzwater made over 100 appearances at Livingston. At the end of the 2022-23 season, Fitzwater became a free agent after deciding not to renew his contract with Livingston.

Fitzwater returned to England and on the 5 September 2023 signed a two-year deal for EFL League One side Exeter City on a free transfer.

== Personal life ==
In a February 2024 interview with the BBC, Fitzwater revealed that he was diagnosed with severe ulcerative colitis and had been going to the toilet up to 40 times a day. Since his diagnosis, Fitzwater has become a member of Crohn's and Colitis UK, and has received a special card and a master key which grants him access to over 9,000 locked public toilets.

== Career statistics ==
As of match played 6 September 2025

Appearances and goals by club, season and competition
Club	Season	League			FA Cup		EFL Cup		Other		Total	
Club	Season	Division	Apps	Goals	Apps	Goals	Apps	Goals	Apps	Goals	Apps	Goals
West Bromwich Albion	2015–16	Premier League	0	0	0	0	0	0	—		0	0
West Bromwich Albion	2016–17	Premier League	0	0	0	0	0	0	3 (Note: Appearance(s) in EFL Trophy)	0	3	0
West Bromwich Albion	2017–18	Premier League	0	0	0	0	0	0	—		0	0
West Bromwich Albion	2018–19	Championship	0	0	0	0	0	0	—		0	0
West Bromwich Albion	2019–20	Championship	0	0	1	0	0	0	—		1	0
West Bromwich Albion	Total		0	0	1	0	0	0	3	0	4	0
Chesterfield (loan)	2015–16	League One	1	0	0	0	0	0	0	0	1	0
Hednesford Town (loan)	2015–16	National League North	16	1	0	0	—		0	0	16	1
Forest Green Rovers (loan)	2017–18	League Two	14	1	1	0	1	0	6	0	22	1
Walsall (loan)	2017–18	League One	16	3	0	0	0	0	0	0	16	3
Walsall (loan)	2018–19	League One	21	0	0	0	2	0	4	1	27	1
Walsall (loan)	Total		37	3	0	0	2	0	4	1	43	4
Livingston	2020–21	Scottish Premiership	20	1	2	1	5	2	—		27	4
Livingston	2021–22	Scottish Premiership	38	3	2	0	6	0	—		46	3
Livingston	2022–23	Scottish Premiership	28	1	2	0	4	0	—		34	1
Livingston	Total		86	5	6	1	15	2	0	0	107	8
Exeter City	2023–24	League One	4	0	0	0	2	0	1	0	7	0
Exeter City	2024–25	League One	16	1	2	0	1	0	4	0	23	1
Exeter City	2025–26	League One	7	1	0	0	0	0	0	0	7	1
Exeter City	Total		27	2	2	0	3	0	5	0	34	2
Career total			181	12	10	1	21	2	18	1	230	16
