= Joe Whitworth =

English footballer (born 2004)

Personal information
- Full name: Joseph Charles Whitworth
- Date of birth: 29 February 2004 (age 22)
- Place of birth: Sutton, England
- Height: 1.78 m (5 ft 10 in)
- Position: Goalkeeper

Team information
- Current team: Wigan Athletic
- Number: 41

Youth career
- 2014–2016: AFC Wimbledon
- 2016–2023: Crystal Palace

Senior career*
Years	Team	Apps	(Gls)
2023–2026	Crystal Palace	2	(0)
2024–2025	→ Exeter City (loan)	46	(0)
2025–2026	→ Exeter City (loan)	40	(0)
2026–	Wigan Athletic	4	(0)

International career^{‡}
2019	England U15	4	(0)
2019	England U16	1	(0)
2021–2022	England U18	2	(0)
- * Club domestic league appearances and goals as of 10 October 2026 (UTC) ‡ National team caps and goals as of 13 June 2022 (UTC)

Joseph Charles Whitworth (born 29 February 2004) is an English professional footballer who plays as a goalkeeper for EFL League One club Wigan Athletic.

== Club career ==
=== Crystal Palace ===
Initially on the books of AFC Wimbledon, Whitworth moved to the Crystal Palace academy in 2016. In January 2023, he signed a contract extension with Palace, after working his way up through their youth teams. He made his senior debut for Palace in a Premier League match against Brighton & Hove Albion on 15 March 2023. In doing so, he became their youngest ever goalkeeper in the Premier League and 5th-youngest in all competitions.

==== Exeter City (two loans) ====
On 16 July 2024, Whitworth joined League One club Exeter City on a season-long loan deal. At the end of the 24/25 season, he was awarded the club's Player of the Season award.

On 10 July 2025, Whitworth joined Exeter City on another season-long loan deal.

On 10 January 2026, Whitworth was involved in the largest scoreline defeat since 1987 conceding 10 goals against Manchester City.

=== Wigan Athletic ===
He joined EFL League One club Wigan Athletic on 1 September 2026 on a deal valid until 2029.

== International career ==
Whitworth is a youth international for England, having won caps from the under-15s through up to the under-18s team. He was called into the under-19s squad in September 2022.

== Career statistics ==
As of 2 September 2026

Appearances and goals by club, season and competition
Club	Season	League			FA Cup		EFL Cup		Other		Total	
Club	Season	Division	Apps	Goals	Apps	Goals	Apps	Goals	Apps	Goals	Apps	Goals
Crystal Palace U21	2021–22	—			—		—		1 (Note: Appearance(s) in EFL Trophy)	0	1	0
Crystal Palace U21	2022–23	—			—		—		3	0	3	0
Crystal Palace U21	2023–24	—			—		—		2	0	2	0
Crystal Palace	2022–23	Premier League	2	0	0	0	0	0	—		2	0
Crystal Palace	2023–24	Premier League	0	0	0	0	0	0	—		0	0
Crystal Palace	Total		2	0	0	0	0	0	—		2	0
Exeter City (loan)	2024–25	EFL League One	46	0	4	0	1	0	0	0	51	0
Exeter City (loan)	2025–26	EFL League One	40	0	3	0	1	0	0	0	44	0
Exeter City (loan)	Total		86	0	7	0	2	0	0	0	95	0
Wigan Athletic	2026–27	EFL League One	1	0	0	0	—		0	0	1	0
Career total			89	0	7	0	2	0	6	0	98	0
