= Jayden Wareham =

English footballer (born 2003)

- Wareham with Wycombe Wanderers in 2026

Personal information
- Full name: Jayden Darren George Wareham
- Date of birth: 13 May 2003 (age 23)
- Place of birth: Ascot, England
- Height: 1.77 m (5 ft 10 in)
- Position: Forward

Team information
- Current team: Wycombe Wanderers

Youth career
- 2011–2014: Reading
- 2014–2019: Queens Park Rangers
- 2019–2020: Woking

Senior career*
Years	Team	Apps	(Gls)
2020–2021	Woking	17	(2)
2021–2023	Chelsea	0	(0)
2022–2023	→ Leyton Orient (loan)	5	(0)
2023–2025	Reading	44	(5)
2025–2026	Exeter City	48	(19)
2026–	Wycombe Wanderers	9	(6)
- * Club domestic league appearances and goals as of 1 November 2026 (UTC)

Jayden Darren George Wareham (born 13 May 2003) is an English professional footballer who plays as a forward for EFL League One club Wycombe Wanderers.

== Career ==
=== Woking ===
Wareham started his career at Reading and then Queens Park Rangers before he was released in 2019 and eventually joining National League side, Woking. After impressing for the under-18 and under-23 sides, he made his debut for The Cards in January 2020, during a 6–2 away defeat to Sutton United, replacing Jake Gray with four minutes remaining. Wareham played two more times in this campaign, and was also named the club's academy player of the year, before signing a new one-year contract with the Surrey-based side in October 2020. On 26 January 2021, he scored his first goals for the club coming off the bench to rescue a point in a 2–2 away draw against Bromley, netting in both the 72nd and 86th minute.

During his two-year spell at Woking, Wareham accolated twenty appearances to his name, scoring twice with both coming against Bromley, before earning himself a trial with Premier League side, Chelsea in March 2021.

=== Chelsea ===
Following a successful trial period, in which he featured three times, scoring once for the under-18 side, Wareham agreed a move to Chelsea in May 2021, signing a two-year deal. Upon his arrival he was placed into the under-23 side for the 2021–22 campaign and went onto feature twenty-seven times, finishing the season as the age group's top goal scorer with seven goals to his name, with notable goals coming in the EFL Trophy and the UEFA Youth League.

On 16 June 2023, Chelsea announced that Wareham would leave the club when his contract expired at the end of June.

==== Loan to Leyton Orient ====
On 1 September 2022, Wareham joined EFL League Two side Leyton Orient on a season-long loan. It took the Ascot-born striker just over two weeks to make his Leyton Orient debut, with it coming during an EFL Trophy group stage tie against Sutton United, in which he netted two goals within the first 10 minutes of the eventual 3–1 victory. These goals proved to be his only contribution in an Orient shirt, with Chelsea cutting the loan short in January 2023. He returned to West London with seven appearances and two goals to his name during the six-month spell.

=== Reading ===
On 1 September 2023, Wareham returned to his boyhood club, Reading signing a one-year deal following his release from Chelsea. Later that month, he made his debut for the club starting in their historic 9–0 away victory over Exeter City in the EFL Trophy, featuring for just over an hour.

On 8 May 2024, Reading activated a one-year extension to Wareham's contract, keeping him at the club until the summer of 2025. He scored his first goal for Reading in an EFL Trophy tie against West Ham United U21s on 20 August 2024. Wareham scored his first league goal for Reading in a 2–1 away win against Exeter City on 22 October 2024, before scoring his first league goal at the Madjeski Stadium 11 February 2025 in a 1–1 draw against Shrewsbury Town.

=== Exeter ===
On 26 June 2025, Exeter City announced they had signed Wareham on a two-year deal, with a club option of a third year, for an undisclosed fee.

=== Wycombe Wanderers ===
On 31 August 2026, Wareham signed with League One club Wycombe Wanderers for an undisclosed fee.

== Career statistics ==
As of match played on 2 May 2026

Appearances and goals by club, season and competition
Club	Season	League			FA Cup		EFL Cup		Other		Total	
Club	Season	Division	Apps	Goals	Apps	Goals	Apps	Goals	Apps	Goals	Apps	Goals
Woking	2019–20	National League	3	0	0	0	—		0	0	3	0
Woking	2020–21	National League	14	2	1	0	—		0	0	14	2
Woking	Total		17	2	1	0	—		0	0	17	2
Chelsea U21	2021–22	—			—		—		3 (Note: Appearances for Chelsea U21 in EFL Trophy)	0	3	0
Chelsea U21	2022–23	—			—		—		0	0	0	0
Chelsea U21	Total		0	0	0	0	0	0	3	0	3	0
Leyton Orient (loan)	2022–23	League Two	5	0	0	0	0	0	2 (Note: Appearance(s) in EFL Trophy)	2	7	2
Reading	2023–24	League One	7	0	0	0	0	0	4	0	11	0
Reading	2024–25	League One	37	5	3	0	1	0	3	2	44	7
Reading	Total		44	5	3	0	1	0	7	2	55	7
Exeter City	2025–26	League One	46	19	3	2	0	0	4	1	53	22
Exeter City	2026–27	League Two	2	0	0	0	1	0	0	0	3	0
Exeter City	Total		48	19	3	2	1	0	4	1	56	22
Career total			114	26	7	2	2	0	16	5	138	33

== Honours ==
Leyton Orient

- EFL League Two: 2022–23
