= Jake Doyle-Hayes =

Irish footballer (born 1998)

Jake Doyle Hayes
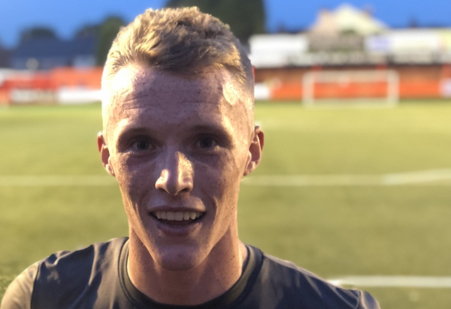
- Doyle Hayes in July 2019

Personal information
- Full name: Jake Billy Doyle Hayes
- Date of birth: 30 December 1998 (age 27)
- Place of birth: Ballyjamesduff, Ireland
- Height: 1.75 m (5 ft 9 in)
- Position: Defensive midfielder

Team information
- Current team: Exeter City
- Number: 31

Youth career
- 2014–2017: Aston Villa

Senior career*
| Years | Team | Apps | (Gls) |
| 2017–2020 | Aston Villa | 0 | (0) |
| 2019 | → Cambridge United (loan) | 6 | (0) |
| 2019–2020 | → Cheltenham Town (loan) | 30 | (1) |
| 2020–2021 | St Mirren | 22 | (1) |
| 2021–2025 | Hibernian | 52 | (2) |
| 2025 | Sligo Rovers | 18 | (0) |
| 2025– | Exeter City | 23 | (0) |

International career^{‡}
| 2014–2015 | Republic of Ireland U17 | 4 | (0) |
| 2016 | Republic of Ireland U18 | 2 | (0) |
| 2016 | Republic of Ireland U19 | 3 | (0) |
| 2018–2020 | Republic of Ireland U21 | 1 | (0) |
- * Club domestic league appearances and goals as of 21 February 2026 (UTC) ‡ National team caps and goals as of 09:59, 23 August 2017 (UTC)

Jake Billy Doyle Hayes (born 30 December 1998) is an Irish professional footballer who plays as a defensive midfielder for EFL League Two club Exeter City.

He has represented Ireland as a youth international. Doyle-Hayes is a product of the Aston Villa Academy and spent six years at the club, making appearances in the Football League Cup in 2017 and 2018 before loan spells at Cambridge United and Cheltenham Town, he left Villa in June 2020. After a season with St Mirren, he signed for Hibernian in June 2021. Doyle-Hayes was released by Hibernian in January 2025 following persistent injuries, and he then returned to Irish football with Sligo Rovers.

== Club career ==
=== Aston Villa ===
In his early teens, he was spotted by scouts while playing for Cavan-Monaghan, a regional representative side. There was interest from Manchester United and Chelsea but he ultimately chose Aston Villa where former Ireland captain Roy Keane was the assistant manager. Doyle Hayes made his debut for Aston Villa in the League Cup on 22 August 2017, starting the match in midfield in a 4–1 victory over Wigan Athletic.

On 5 September 2017 Doyle Hayes agreed a new three-year contract with the club.

On 31 January 2019, Doyle Hayes joined Cambridge United on a 6-month loan. However, he struggled to cement a place in the first team due to injury and international call-ups and only made 6 appearances.

On 1 August 2019, Doyle Hayes joined EFL League Two side Cheltenham Town on a season-long loan. He impressed Cheltenham fans immediately, and was voted player of the month for August. Doyle Hayes scored his first ever goal at senior level on 17 September 2019, in a 3–2 victory over Bradford City.

On 25 June 2020, Doyle Hayes was released by Aston Villa.

=== St Mirren ===
On 3 November 2020, Doyle Hayes signed a short-term contract with Scottish Premiership side St Mirren, due to last until the end of the 2020–21 season. Doyle Hayes explained that while he had had "a lot of interest" since leaving Aston Villa, the opportunity to work with manager Jim Goodwin excited him the most.

Doyle Hayes made his debut on 6 November 2020, in a 0–0 draw in the Scottish Premiership against Dundee United. Doyle Hayes scored his first goal in the Scottish Premiership on 22 November 2020, in a 1–0 victory at Livingston. He made 30 appearances in total for St Mirren, before choosing to leave the club at the end of his contract.

=== Hibernian ===
Doyle Hayes signed a two-year contract with Hibernian in June 2021. He played regularly for the team during his first season with the club, and he signed an extended contract in November 2021. On 19 February 2022, Doyle Hayes scored both goals in a 2–0 win against Ross County in the Scottish Premiership. Hibs accepted an offer from Forest Green Rovers for Doyle Hayes in December 2022, but he rejected that proposal. His appearances over the next two seasons were limited by persistent injuries, and he was released from his contract in January 2025.

In May 2025, Doyle Hayes began court proceedings against Hibernian due to an ankle injury caused by then manager Lee Johnson during a training session.

=== Sligo Rovers ===
On 13 February 2025, Doyle Hayes signed for Sligo Rovers for the upcoming 2025 League of Ireland Premier Division season.

=== Exeter City ===
On 1 August 2025, Doyle Hayes joined EFL League One side Exeter City for an undisclosed fee on a two-year deal.

Doyle Hayes was given the number 31 shirt which is reserved for the clubs "1931 Fund Player" which is a player part funded by the supporters.

== Legal issues ==
In May 2025, Doyle Hayes began legal action against Hibernian, after a tackle from his then manager Lee Johnson during a training match left Doyle Hayes requiring surgery, which he claimed had "greatly restricted" his subsequent career.

== Career statistics ==
As of match played on 10 August 2026

Appearances and goals by club, season and competition
| Club | Season | League | | | National Cup (Note: Includes FA Cup, Scottish Cup & FAI Cup) | | League Cup (Note: Includes EFL Cup & Scottish League Cup) | | Other | | Total | |
| Club | Season | Division | Apps | Goals | Apps | Goals | Apps | Goals | Apps | Goals | Apps | Goals |
|---|---|---|---|---|---|---|---|---|---|---|---|---|
| Aston Villa | 2017–18 | Championship | 0 | 0 | 0 | 0 | 2 | 0 | — | | 2 | 0 |
| Aston Villa | 2018–19 | Championship | 0 | 0 | 0 | 0 | 1 | 0 | — | | 1 | 0 |
| Aston Villa | Total | | 0 | 0 | 0 | 0 | 3 | 0 | 0 | 0 | 3 | 0 |
| Cambridge United (loan) | 2018–19 | EFL League Two | 6 | 0 | 0 | 0 | 0 | 0 | — | | 6 | 0 |
| Cheltenham Town (loan) | 2019–20 | EFL League Two | 30 | 1 | 3 | 0 | 1 | 0 | 2 (Note: Appearances in the EFL League Two play-offs) | 0 | 36 | 1 |
| St Mirren | 2020–21 | Scottish Premiership | 22 | 1 | 4 | 0 | 4 | 0 | — | | 30 | 1 |
| Hibernian | 2021–22 | Scottish Premiership | 34 | 2 | 3 | 0 | 4 | 0 | 3 (Note: Appearances in the UEFA Europa Conference League) | 0 | 44 | 2 |
| Hibernian | 2022–23 | Scottish Premiership | 17 | 0 | 0 | 0 | 2 | 0 | — | | 19 | 0 |
| Hibernian | 2023–24 | Scottish Premiership | 1 | 0 | 0 | 0 | 0 | 0 | 4 | 0 | 5 | 0 |
| Hibernian | 2024–25 | Scottish Premiership | 1 | 0 | 0 | 0 | 0 | 0 | — | | 1 | 0 |
| Hibernian | Total | | 53 | 2 | 3 | 0 | 6 | 0 | 7 | 0 | 69 | 2 |
| Sligo Rovers | 2025 | LOI Premier Division | 18 | 0 | 1 | 0 | — | | — | | 19 | 0 |
| Exeter City | 2025–26 | EFL League One | 23 | 0 | 2 | 0 | 0 | 0 | 0 | 0 | 25 | 0 |
| Exeter City | 2026–27 | EFL League Two | 0 | 0 | 0 | 0 | 1 | 0 | 0 | 0 | 1 | 0 |
| Exeter City | Total | | 23 | 0 | 2 | 0 | 1 | 0 | 0 | 0 | 26 | 0 |
| Career total | | | 152 | 4 | 13 | 0 | 15 | 0 | 9 | 0 | 189 | 4 |

== Honours ==
Aston Villa U23s

- Premier League Cup: 2018–19
