= George Birch (footballer) =

English football player

Personal information
- Full name: George Edward Birch
- Date of birth: 24 September 2006 (age 20)
- Place of birth: Yeovil, England
- Height: 1.62 m (5 ft 4 in)
- Position: Attacking midfielder

Team information
- Current team: Exeter City
- Number: 20

Youth career
- Yeovil Town
- Exeter City

Senior career*
Years	Team	Apps	(Gls)
2025–	Exeter City	12	(0)
2025–2026	→ Weston-super-Mare (loan)	7	(0)
2026	→ Chippenham Town (loan)	4	(0)
- * Club domestic league appearances and goals as of 07:37, 21 October 2026 (UTC)

George Edward Birch (born 24 September 2006) is an English professional footballer who plays as a midfielder for EFL League Two club Exeter City.

== Playing career ==
Born in Yeovil, Birch originally played in Yeovil Town's academy but left due to the closure of the club’s academy and joined Exeter City at U14 level. On 22 May 2025, Birch signed his first professional contract with Exeter. He made his debut for the club on the opening game of the 2025–26 League One season in a 1–0 away defeat to Doncaster Rovers on 2 August 2025.

On 31 October 2025, Birch joined National League South side Weston-super-Mare on loan until January 2026. He made seven league appearances for Weston-super-Mare before being re-called Exeter in January 2026. Shortly upon rejoining Exeter, Birch scored his first goal in professional football in a 10–1 FA Cup third-round defeat to Premier League side Manchester City at the Etihad Stadium on 10 January 2026. Birch's goal was scored with his weaker foot from 35-yards out but was ultimately a late consolation scored in the 90th minute. After the game, Exeter boss Gary Caldwell praised Birch saying that he had a "big future". On 26 March 2026, he returned to the National League South, joining Chippenham Town on loan for the remainder of the season.

On 14 April 2026, he signed a new one-year deal with Exeter City.
