= 2024–25 Plymouth Argyle F.C. season =

English football club season

Plymouth Argyle
2024–25 season
- Owner: Simon Hallett
- Chairman: Simon Hallett
- Head Coach: Wayne Rooney (untl 31 December); Kevin Nancekivell (interim); Miron Muslić (from 10 January)
- Stadium: Home Park
- EFL Championship: 23rd (relegated)
- FA Cup: Fifth Round
- EFL Cup: Second round
- Top goalscorer: League: Ryan Hardie; Mustapha Bundu (10 each); All: Ryan Hardie (12)
- Highest home attendance: 17,005
- Lowest home attendance: 15,305
- Average home league attendance: 16,537
Home colours	Away colours	Third colours

The 2024–25 season was the 139th season in the history of Plymouth Argyle Football Club and their second consecutive season in the Championship. In addition to the domestic league, the club would also participate in the FA Cup, and the EFL Cup.

== Players ==
As of 6 June 2024

No.	Player	Position	Nationality	Place of birth	Date of birth (age)	Signed from	Date signed	Fee	Contract end
Goalkeepers
21	Conor Hazard	GK	(Northern Ireland)	(Northern Ireland) Downpatrick	5 March 1998 (age 26)	(Scotland) Celtic	11 July 2023	Undisclosed	30 June 2026
33	Zak Baker	GK	(England)	Aylesbury	19 November 2004 (age 19)	Academy	1 July 2023	-	30 June 2025
Defenders
2	Bali Mumba	RB	(England)	South Shields	8 October 2001 (age 22)	Norwich City	21 July 2023	Undisclosed	30 June 2027
5	Julio Pleguezelo	CB	(Spain)	(Spain) Palma de Mallorca	26 January 1997 (age 27)	(Netherlands) FC Twente	1 July 2023	Free transfer	30 June 2025
8	Joe Edwards	RB	(England)	Gloucester	31 October 1990 (age 33)	Walsall	1 July 2019	Free transfer	30 June 2025
17	Lewis Gibson	CB	(England)	Durham	19 July 2000 (age 23)	Everton	3 July 2023	Free transfer	-
22	Brendon Galloway	LB	(Zimbabwe)	(Zimbabwe) Harare	17 March 1996 (age 28)	Luton Town	21 July 2021	Free transfer	30 June 2026
24	Saxon Earley	LB	(England)	-	11 October 2002 (age 21)	Norwich City	2 January 2023	Undisclosed	-
29	Matthew Sorinola	LB	(England)	London	19 February 2001 (age 23)	(Belgium) Royal Union Saint-Gilloise	17 January 2024	Free transfer	-
54	Jack Matthews	CB	(England)	Newquay	9 November 2005 (age 18)	Academy	1 July 2024	-	30 June 2025
Midfielders
4	Jordan Houghton	DM	(England)	Chertsey	5 November 1995 (age 28)	MK Dons	1 July 2021	Free transfer	30 June 2025
11	Callum Wright	CM	(England)	Huyton	2 May 2000 (age 24)	Blackpool	4 January 2023	Undisclosed	30 June 2026
14	Mickel Miller	LM	(England)	London	2 December 1995 (age 28)	Rotherham United	1 July 2022	Free transfer	30 June 2024
20	Adam Randell	DM	(England)	Plymouth	1 October 2000 (age 23)	Academy	1 July 2019	-	30 June 2026
27	Adam Forshaw	CM	(England)	Liverpool	8 October 1991 (age 32)	Norwich City	19 January 2024	Free transfer	-
32	Will Jenkins-Davies	AM	(Wales)	Torquay	22 October 2004 (age 19)	Academy	1 July 2022	-	30 June 2024
34	Caleb Roberts	CM	(England)	Ivybridge	24 October 2005 (age 18)	Academy	18 August 2023	-	30 June 2026
-	Josh Bernard	CM	(England)	-	-	Academy	1 July 2024	-	-
Forwards
9	Ryan Hardie	ST	(Scotland)	(Scotland) Stranraer	17 March 1997 (age 27)	Blackpool	29 January 2021	Undisclosed	30 June 2026
10	Morgan Whittaker	RW	(England)	Derby	7 January 2001 (age 23)	(Wales) Swansea City	17 July 2023	£1,000,000	30 June 2027
15	Mustapha Bundu	RW	(Sierra Leone)	(Sierra Leone) Freetown	28 February 1997 (age 27)	(Belgium) RSC Anderlecht	1 September 2023	Undisclosed	30 June 2025
19	Tyreik Wright	RW	(Republic of Ireland)	(Republic of Ireland) Ovens	22 September 2001 (age 22)	Aston Villa	9 January 2023	Undisclosed	-
23	Ben Waine	ST	(New Zealand)	(New Zealand) Wellington	11 June 2001 (age 22)	(New Zealand) Wellington Phoenix	1 January 2023	Undisclosed	30 June 2025
35	Freddie Issaka	ST	(Wales)	(England) Truro	28 July 2006 (age 17)	Academy	28 July 2023		

== Transfers ==
=== In ===
Date	Pos.	Player	From	Fee	Ref.
1 July 2024 (Note: The transfer was announced on 30 May, and would become official on July 1 once his Swansea City contract expired)	LB	(England) Nathanael Ogbeta	(Wales) Swansea City	Free	
25 July 2024	CB	(Iceland) Victor Pálsson	(Belgium) Eupen	Free	
5 August 2024	CB	(Hungary) Kornél Szűcs	(Hungary) Kecskeméti	Undisclosed	
23 August 2024	GK	(England) Daniel Grimshaw	(England) Blackpool	Undisclosed	
30 August 2024	AM	(Sweden) Rami Al Hajj	(Denmark) Odense	Undisclosed	
13 September 2024	GK	(Slovakia) Marko Maroši	(England) Shrewsbury Town	Free	
4 October 2024	CF	(Jamaica) Andre Gray	(Saudi Arabia) Al-Riyadh	Free	
3 January 2025	AM	(Ghana) Michael Baidoo	(Sweden) Elfsborg	Undisclosed	
31 January 2025	CB	(Ukraine) Maksym Talovierov	(Austria) LASK	Undisclosed	
3 February 2025	DM	(England) Malachi Boateng	(Scotland) Heart of Midlothian	Undisclosed	

=== Out ===
Date	Pos.	Player	To	Fee	Ref.
4 July 2024	RW	(Republic of Ireland) Tyreik Wright	(England) Bradford City	Undisclosed	
2 August 2024	CB	(England) Dan Scarr	(Wales) Wrexham	Undisclosed	
15 August 2024	GK	(England) Michael Cooper	(England) Sheffield United	Undisclosed	
3 January 2025	CB	(England) Lewis Gibson	(England) Preston North End	Undisclosed	
24 January 2025	RW	(England) Morgan Whittaker	(England) Middlesbrough	Undisclosed	

=== Loaned in ===
Date	Pos.	Player	From	Date until	Ref.
2 July 2024	CM	(England) Darko Gyabi	(England) Leeds United	End of Season	
2 July 2024	CF	(Nigeria) Muhamed Tijani	(Czech Republic) Slavia Prague	End of Season	
9 July 2024	LW	(Netherlands) Ibrahim Cissoko	(France) Toulouse	1 February 2025 (Note: On 1 February, Cissoko was recalled to his parent club Toulouse)	
22 August 2024	CF	(Republic of Ireland) Michael Obafemi	(England) Burnley	End of Season	
9 January 2025	LB	(Poland) Tymoteusz Puchacz	(Germany) Holstein Kiel	End of Season	
31 January 2025	CB	(Bosnia and Herzegovina) Nikola Katić	(Switzerland) Zürich	End of Season	

=== Loaned out ===
Date	Pos.	Player	To	Date until	Ref.
23 July 2024	GK	(England) Zak Baker	(England) Plymouth Parkway	17 September 2024	
9 August 2024	CM	(England) Josh Bernard	(England) Tavistock		
9 August 2024	CB	(England) Jack Matthews	(England) Tavistock		
30 August 2024	LB	(England) Saxon Earley	(England) Lincoln City	14 January 2025 (Note: On 14 January, Earley was recalled from his loan at Lincoln)	
30 August 2024	CF	(New Zealand) Ben Waine	(England) Mansfield Town	End of Season	
17 September 2024	AM	(Wales) Will Jenkins-Davies	(England) Torquay United	End of Season (Note: On 18 December, Jenkins-Davies' loan at Torquay was extended until the end of season)	
20 September 2024	GK	(England) Zak Baker	(England) Tiverton Town	1 January 2025	
4 October 2024	CB	(England) Jack Matthews	(England) Taunton Town	27 December 2024	
8 October 2024	CM	(England) Josh Bernard	(England) Tiverton Town	31 December 2024	
28 January 2025	CM	(England) Josh Bernard	(England) Mousehole	25 February 2025	

=== Released / Out of Contract ===
Date	Pos.	Player	Subsequent club	Join date	Ref.
30 June 2024	LM	(England) Mickel Miller	(England) Huddersfield Town	1 July 2024	
30 June 2024	GK	(England) Callum Burton	(Wales) Wrexham	15 July 2024	
30 June 2024	CB	(England) Oscar Halls	(United States) Loyola Greyhounds	1 August 2024	
30 June 2024	LB	(England) Jack Endacott	(England) Tavistock	8 August 2024	
3 January 2025	CF	(Jamaica) Andre Gray	(Turkey) Fatih Karagümrük	13 January 2025	
11 January 2025	CM	(England) Adam Forshaw	(England) Blackburn Rovers	11 January 2025	
14 January 2025	GK	(Slovakia) Marko Maroši	(England) Cambridge United	14 January 2025	

== Pre-season and friendlies ==
On 5 June, Argyle confirmed their pre-season schedule, with matches against Cheltenham Town, Torquay United and Milton Keynes Dons along with a training camp in Spain. A day later, a visit to face Bristol Rovers was added. On 16 June, Orlando Pirates were confirmed as the opponents during the training camp in Costa del Sol.

Win Draw Loss Fixtures

12 July 2024 Friendly	Orlando Pirates	2–2	Plymouth Argyle	Marbella, Spain
19:00 CEST (18:00 BST)	Makgopa (?); Ndah (?)	Report	Issaka 35'; Wright 63'	Stadium: Banús Football Centre

20 July 2024 Friendly	Cheltenham Town	1–5	Plymouth Argyle	Cheltenham
15:00 BST	Dulson 19'	Report	Cissoko 27'; Whittaker 29'; Tijani 36' 59'; Hardie 66'	Stadium: Whaddon Road; Attendance: 2,339; Referee: Sam Allison

27 July 2024 Friendly	Torquay United	0–2	Plymouth Argyle	Torquay
15:00 BST		Report	Hardie 50' (pen.); Mumba 60'	Stadium: Plainmoor

30 July 2024 Friendly	Bristol Rovers	2–1	Plymouth Argyle	Horfield
19:00 BST	Omochere 9'; Hunt 32'	Report	Hardie 85'	Stadium: Memorial Stadium; Attendance: 3,266

3 August 2024 Friendly	Milton Keynes Dons	0–1	Plymouth Argyle	Denbigh
15:00 BST		Report	Hardie 68'	Stadium: Stadium MK; Attendance: 2,682

== Competitions ==
=== Championship ===
==== League table ====
Pos	Team	Pld	W	D	L	GF	GA	GD	Pts	Promotion, qualification or relegation
20	Preston North End	46	10	20	16	48	59	−11	50	
21	Hull City	46	12	13	21	44	54	−10	49	
22	Luton Town (R)	46	13	10	23	45	69	−24	49	Relegation to EFL League One
23	Plymouth Argyle (R)	46	11	13	22	51	88	−37	46	Relegation to EFL League One
24	Cardiff City (R)	46	9	17	20	48	73	−25	44	Relegation to EFL League One

Source: English Football League
Rules for classification: 1) Points; 2) Goal difference; 3) Number of goals scored; 4) Head-to-head results; 5) Wins; 6) Away goals; 7) Penalty points (sec 9.5); 8) Number of 12-point sending off offences; 9) Play-off (only if needed to determine promotion/relegation)
(R) Relegated

==== Results summary ====
Overall								Home						Away					
Pld	W	D	L	GF	GA	GD	Pts	W	D	L	GF	GA	GD	W	D	L	GF	GA	GD
46	11	13	22	51	88	−37	46	9	7	7	40	39	+1	2	6	15	11	49	−38

Last updated: 26 April 2025.
Source: Soccerway

==== Results by round ====
Round	1	2	3	4	5	6	7	8	9	10	11	12	13	14	15	16	17	18	20	21	22	23	24	25	26	19^{1}	27	28	29	30	32	33	31^{2}	34	35	36	37	38	39	40	41	42	43	44	45	46
Ground	A	H	A	H	H	A	H	A	H	A	A	H	A	H	A	H	A	A	H	A	H	A	A	H	A	H	H	H	A	H	H	A	A	H	A	H	A	H	A	H	A	H	A	H	A	H
Result	L	D	D	L	W	L	W	L	W	L	L	D	L	W	D	D	L	L	L	L	D	L	L	D	D	D	L	L	D	W	W	L	D	D	L	L	W	L	D	W	L	W	L	W	W	L
Position	24	21	21	22	16	20	16	18	14	19	21	21	22	22	18	19	20	21	23	23	24	24	24	24	24	24	24	24	24	24	23	23	23	22	23	24	24	24	24	24	24	24	24	24	23	23
Points	0	1	2	2	5	5	8	8	11	11	11	12	12	15	16	17	17	17	17	17	18	18	18	19	20	21	21	21	22	25	28	28	29	30	30	30	33	33	34	37	37	40	40	43	46	46

Source: EFL
A = Away; H = Home; W = Win; D = Draw; L = Loss; P = Postponed
Notes:
- ^{1} Matchday 19 (vs. Oxford United) was postponed due to severe weather caused by Storm Darragh.
- ^{2} Matchday 31 (vs. Luton Town) was postponed due to FA Cup involvements.

==== Matches ====
The league fixtures were released on 26 June 2024.

Win Draw Loss Fixtures

11 August 2024 1	Sheffield Wednesday	4–0	Plymouth Argyle	Sheffield
16:00 BST	J. Lowe 35', (yellow card) 45'; Galloway 52' (o.g.); Windass 82'; Smith 90+6'	Report	Cissoko (yellow card) 45+2'	Stadium: Hillsborough Stadium; Attendance: 29,535 (1,300 away); Referee: Lewis Smith

17 August 2024 2	Plymouth Argyle	1–1	Hull City	Plymouth
15:00 BST	Edwards (yellow card) 35'; Cissoko 52', (yellow card) 53'; Forshaw (yellow card) 72'	Report	Coyle 63'; Millar (yellow card) 79'	Stadium: Home Park; Attendance: 16,306 (623 away); Referee: Leigh Doughty

24 August 2024 3	Queens Park Rangers	1–1	Plymouth Argyle	Shepherd's Bush
12:30 BST	Frey 3'; Clarke-Salter (yellow card) 85'; Varane (yellow card) 90+2'	Report	Forshaw (yellow card) 20' (yellow-red card) 29'; Whittaker 28'; Gyabi (yellow card) 42'; Randell (yellow card) 54'; Issaka (red card) 90+1'; Hazard (yellow card) 90+4'	Stadium: Loftus Road; Attendance: 15,285 (1,750 away); Referee: Gavin Ward
Note: Fixture was initially scheduled for a 15:00 kick-off, but was moved for live Sky Sports broadcast.

31 August 2024 4	Plymouth Argyle	0–1	Stoke City	Plymouth
15:00 BST	Forshaw (yellow card) 90+4'	Report	Bocat (yellow card) 14'; Burger (yellow card) 32'; Wilmot (yellow card) 67'; Manhoef 83'	Stadium: Home Park; Attendance: 16,934 (1,662 away); Referee: Oliver Langford

14 September 2024 5	Plymouth Argyle	3–2	Sunderland	Plymouth
15:00 BST	Gyabi (yellow card) 28'; Whittaker (yellow card) 46'; Ballard 54' (o.g.); Szűcs (yellow card) 57'; Hardie 73' (pen.); Edwards (yellow card) 82', (goal) 90+3'	Report	Roberts 24' (pen.), (yellow card) 81'; Bellingham (yellow card) 48'; Mundle (yellow card) 56', (goal) 86'; Hume (yellow card) 59'	Stadium: Home Park; Attendance: 16,967 (1,723 away); Referee: John Brooks

21 September 2024 6	West Bromwich Albion	1–0	Plymouth Argyle	West Bromwich
15:00 BST	Mowatt (yellow card) 56'; Maja 62'; Wallace (yellow card) 72'; Heggem (yellow card) 90+2'	Report	Edwards (yellow card) 55'; Szűcs (yellow card) 68'	Stadium: The Hawthorns; Attendance: 25,754 (2,120 away); Referee: Andrew Kitchen

27 September 2024 7	Plymouth Argyle	3–1	Luton Town	Plymouth
20:00 BST	Al Hajj 8'; Randell (yellow card) 36'; Cissoko 69', 90+3'	Report	Abebayo (yellow card) 15'; Moses 70'; Walters (yellow card) 83'; Burke (yellow card) 87'; Clark (yellow card) 87'	Stadium: Home Park; Attendance: 16,616 (1,113 away); Referee: John Busby
Note: Fixture was initially scheduled for 28 September, but was moved for live Sky Sports broadcast.

1 October 2024 8	Burnley	1–0	Plymouth Argyle	Burnley
19:45 BST	Brownhill 26' (pen.); Egan-Riley (yellow card) 33'	Report		Stadium: Turf Moor; Attendance: 18,779 (1,300 away); Referee: Bobby Madley

5 October 2024 9	Plymouth Argyle	2–1	Blackburn Rovers	Plymouth
15:00 BST	Obafemi 15'; Randell (yellow card) 67'; Houghton (yellow card) 88'; Whittaker 90+7', (yellow card) 90+8'; Mumba (yellow card) 90+9'	Report	Hyam (yellow card) 22'; Dolan (yellow card) 49'; Rankin-Costello 86', (yellow card) 90+9'	Stadium: Home Park; Attendance: 16,635 (1,091 away); Referee: James Linington

19 October 2024 10	Cardiff City	5–0	Plymouth Argyle	Cardiff
12:30 BST	Robertson 16', (yellow card) 48'; Colwill 24'; Robinson (yellow card) 39', (goal) 75'; Ng (yellow card) 42'; El Ghazi 52'; Willock 80'	Report	Cissoko (red card) 41'; Edwards (yellow card) 88'	Stadium: Cardiff City Stadium; Attendance: 20,634 (3,200 away); Referee: Andrew Kitchen
Note: Fixture was initially scheduled for a 15:00 kick-off, but was moved for live Sky Sports broadcast.

22 October 2024 11	Millwall	1–0	Plymouth Argyle	Bermondsey
19:45 BST	Honeyman (yellow card) 8'; Esse 13'; Azeez (yellow card) 45+1'; Saville (yellow card) 59'; Cooper (yellow card) 76'; Bryan (yellow card) 84'	Report	Szűcs (yellow card) 63'	Stadium: The Den; Attendance: 13,954 (1,428 away); Referee: Sam Allison

26 October 2024 12	Plymouth Argyle	3–3	Preston North End	Plymouth
15:00 BST	Issaka 55'; Gray 82'; Whittaker 90+2'	Report	Greenwood 16', (yellow card) 46'; Kesler-Hayden (yellow card) 41'; Frøkjær-Jensen 45+3'; Potts 48'; Ledson (yellow card) 59'	Stadium: Home Park; Attendance: 16,443 (597 away); Referee: Andy Davies

2 November 2024 13	Leeds United	3–0	Plymouth Argyle	Leeds
15:00 GMT	James 30'; Piroe 33'; Aaronson 38'	Report		Stadium: Elland Road; Attendance: 36,066 (1,379 away); Referee: David Webb

5 November 2024 14	Plymouth Argyle	1–0	Portsmouth	Plymouth
20:00 GMT	Whittaker (yellow card) 4'; Gray (yellow card) 25'; Gyabi (yellow card) 34'; Pleguezuelo (yellow card) 60'; Obafemi 82'	Report	Lang (yellow card) 67'; Potts (yellow card) 78'	Stadium: Home Park; Attendance: 16,647 (1,143 away); Referee: James Bell
Note: Fixture was initially scheduled for a 19:45 kick-off, but was moved for live Sky Sports broadcast.

9 November 2024 15	Derby County	1–1	Plymouth Argyle	Derby
15:00 GMT	Yates 8'; Jackson (yellow card) 57'	Report	Randell 41'; Bundu (yellow card) 42'; Sorinola (yellow card) 65'; Mumba (yellow card) 68'; Grimshaw (yellow card) 85'	Stadium: Pride Park Stadium; Attendance: 29,652 (1,907 away); Referee: Simon Hooper

22 November 2024 16	Plymouth Argyle	2–2	Watford	Plymouth
20:00 GMT	Mumba (yellow card) 1'; Gray 23', 90+6'; Gibson (yellow card) 54'	Report	Bayo 8'; Porteous 41', (yellow card) 88'	Stadium: Home Park; Attendance: 16,400 (1,180 away); Referee: Andy Davies
Note: Fixture was initially scheduled for 23 November, but was moved for live Sky Sports broadcast.

26 November 2024 17	Norwich City	6–1	Plymouth Argyle	Norwich
19:45 GMT	Sainz 2', 17', 72'; Duffy 51'; Ben Slimane 80'; Crnac 82'	Report	Sorinola (yellow card) 38'; Bundu 39'	Stadium: Carrow Road; Attendance: 25,893 (461 away); Referee: Sunny Singh Gill

30 November 2024 18	Bristol City	4–0	Plymouth Argyle	Bristol
15:00 GMT	Twine 57'; Mehmeti 62', 70'; Wells (yellow card) 66'; Armstrong 90'	Report	Pálsson (yellow card) 31'; Grimshaw (yellow card) 66'; Forshaw (yellow card) 89'	Stadium: Ashton Gate; Attendance: 24,317 (3,390 away); Referee: Tim Robinson

10 December 2024 20	Plymouth Argyle	1–2	Swansea City	Plymouth
19:45 GMT	Bundu 79'	Report	Key (yellow card) 20'; Fulton 44'; Cullen 60'; Peart-Harris (yellow card) 90+3'; Vipotnik (yellow card) 90+4'	Stadium: Home Park; Attendance: 15,305 (463 away); Referee: Stephen Martin

14 December 2024 21	Sheffield United	2–0	Plymouth Argyle	Sheffield
15:00 GMT	Hamer 19'; Moore 88' (pen.)	Report	Szűcs (yellow card) 60'; Gyabi (yellow card) 68'	Stadium: Bramall Lane; Attendance: 27,237; Referee: Farai Hallam

21 December 2024 22	Plymouth Argyle	3–3	Middlesbrough	Plymouth
15:00 GMT	Gibson 38'; Gyabi 72', (yellow card) 87'; Ogbeta (yellow card) 77'; Bundu 81'	Report	Howson 50'; Edmundson (yellow card) 70'; Hackney 77'; Latte Lath 84'; Doak (yellow card) 90+6'	Stadium: Home Park; Attendance: 16,550; Referee: Will Finnie

26 December 2024 23	Coventry City	4–0	Plymouth Argyle	Coventry
15:00 GMT	Sakamoto 5'; Eccles 20', 45'; Mason-Clark 39'	Report	Szűcs (yellow card) 85'; Wright (red card) 87'	Stadium: Coventry Building Society Arena; Attendance: 29,420; Referee: Adam Herczeg

29 December 2024 24	Oxford United	2–0	Plymouth Argyle	Oxford
15:00 GMT	Brown 14'; Płacheta 61'	Report	Sorinola (yellow card) 65'; Roberts (yellow card) 73'	Stadium: Kassam Stadium; Attendance: 11,438; Referee: David Webb

1 January 2025 25	Plymouth Argyle	2–2	Bristol City	Plymouth
12:30 GMT	Al Hajj 50'; Sorinola (yellow card) 65'; Pleguezuelo 90+1'	Report	Mehmeti 32'; Knight 56'	Stadium: Home Park; Attendance: 17,005; Referee: Tim Robinson
Note: Fixture was initially scheduled for a 15:00 kick-off, but was moved following an agreement between the two sides.

4 January 2025 26	Stoke City	0–0	Plymouth Argyle	Stoke-on-Trent
12:30 GMT	Gooch (yellow card) 27'	Report	Hazard (yellow card) 41'; Al Hajj (yellow card) 59'	Stadium: Bet365 Stadium; Attendance: 26,168; Referee: Dean Whitestone
Note: Fixture was initially scheduled for a 15:00 kick-off, but was moved for live Sky Sports broadcast.

14 January 2025 19	Plymouth Argyle	1–1	Oxford United	Plymouth
19:45 GMT	Al Hajj 63'; Gyabi (yellow card) 78'	Report	Vaulks 44'; Brown (yellow card) 61'	Stadium: Home Park; Attendance: 15,933; Referee: Sam Allison
Note: Fixture was originally scheduled for 7 December, but was postponed due to severe weather caused by Storm Darragh.

18 January 2025 27	Plymouth Argyle	0–1	Queens Park Rangers	Plymouth
12:30 GMT	Houghton (yellow card) 60'	Report	Varane (yellow card) 1'; Smyth (yellow card) 55'; Edwards (yellow card) 64'; Kolli 65'	Stadium: Home Park; Attendance: 16,988; Referee: Darren Bond
Note: Fixture was initially scheduled for a 15:00 kick-off, but was moved for live Sky Sports broadcast.

22 January 2025 28	Plymouth Argyle	0–5	Burnley	Plymouth
20:00 GMT	Sorinola (yellow card) 87'	Report	Flemming 11', 31'; Laurent 34', 45'; Cullen 45+2'	Stadium: Home Park; Attendance: 15,509; Referee: John Busby
Note: Fixture was initially scheduled for a 19:45 kick-off, but was moved for live Sky Sports broadcast.

25 January 2025 29	Sunderland	2–2	Plymouth Argyle	Sunderland
15:00 GMT	Isidor 60', (yellow card) 72'; Hume 72'	Report	Pleguezuelo (yellow card) 28'; Bundu (yellow card) 53'; Patterson 58' (o.g.); Sorinola (yellow card) 71'; Gyabi (yellow card) 79'; Ogbeta 90'	Stadium: Stadium of Light; Attendance: 41,097; Referee: Oliver Langford

1 February 2025 30	Plymouth Argyle	2–1	West Bromwich Albion	Plymouth
12:30 GMT	Hardie 77' (pen.), 88'	Report	Molumby 74'; Wallace (yellow card) 76'	Stadium: Home Park; Attendance: 16,870; Referee: Dean Whitestone
Note: Fixture was initially scheduled for a 19:45 kick-off, but was moved for live Sky Sports broadcast.

12 February 2025 32	Plymouth Argyle	5–1	Millwall	Plymouth
19:45 GMT	Bryan 6' (o.g.); Hardie 10' (pen.), 56'; Randell (yellow card) 40'; Bundu 53'; Katić 86'	Report	Bryan 80'	Stadium: Home Park; Attendance: 15,453; Referee: Jeremy Simpson

15 February 2025 33	Blackburn Rovers	2–0	Plymouth Argyle	Blackburn
15:00 GMT	Forshaw 55'; Dolan 78'	Report	Talovierov (yellow card) 12'; Randell (yellow card) 83'	Stadium: Ewood Park; Attendance: 14,875; Referee: Sam Allison

19 February 2025 31	Luton Town	1–1	Plymouth Argyle	Luton
19:45 GMT	Brown 55'	Report	Talovierov 70'; Szűcs (yellow card) 77'; Bundu (yellow card) 90+1'	Stadium: Kenilworth Road; Attendance: 11,752; Referee: James Linington
Note: Fixture was initially scheduled for 8 February, but was postponed due to Plymouth's involvements in the FA Cup.

22 February 2025 34	Plymouth Argyle	1–1	Cardiff City	Plymouth
12:30 GMT	Tijani 67', (yellow card) 90+8'; Randell (yellow card) 82'; Talovierov (yellow card) 90+1'; Katić (yellow card) 90+6'	Report	Salech 12'; Rinomhota (yellow card) 90+3'; Ng (yellow card) 90+8'; Mannsverk (yellow card) 90+12'	Stadium: Home Park; Attendance: 16,981; Referee: James Bell
Note: Fixture was initially scheduled for a 19:45 kick-off, but was moved for live Sky Sports broadcast.

4 March 2025 35	Hull City	2–0	Plymouth Argyle	Kingston upon Hull
19:45 GMT	Hughes (yellow card) 36'; Gelhardt 48'; Kamara 61'	Report	Talovierov (yellow card) 16'; Puchacz (yellow card) 47'; Sorinola (yellow card) 88'	Stadium: MKM Stadium; Attendance: 18,772; Referee: Andy Davies
Note: Fixture was initially scheduled for 1 March, but was postponed due to Plymouth's involvements in the FA Cup.

8 March 2025 36	Plymouth Argyle	0–3	Sheffield Wednesday	Plymouth
15:00 GMT	Pleguezuelo (yellow card) 38'; Katić (yellow card) 51'; Gyabi (yellow card) 75'	Report	Ogbeta 15' (o.g.); Windass (yellow card) 24'; Lowe (yellow card) 29'; Beadle (yellow card) 31'; Bannan (yellow card) 32'; Paterson 41'; Gassama 68'; Kobacki (yellow card) 79'	Stadium: Home Park; Attendance: 16,981; Referee: Ben Toner

12 March 2025 37	Portsmouth	1–2	Plymouth Argyle	Portsmouth
19:45 GMT	Aouchiche 89', (yellow card) 90+9'; Bramall (yellow card) 90+7'	Report	Bundu 44'; Hardie 49'; Sorinola (yellow card) 67' (yellow-red card) 86'; Gyabi (yellow card) 90+6'	Stadium: Fratton Park; Attendance: 20,394; Referee: Matt Donohue
Note: Fixture was initially scheduled for 11 March, but was moved due to Portsmouth playing on the preceding Sunday.

15 March 2025 38	Plymouth Argyle	2–3	Derby County	Plymouth
15:00 GMT	Bundu 38'; Phillips 46' (o.g.)	Report	Harness 11', 88'; Armstrong 26'; Phillips (yellow card) 45+5'; Thompson (yellow card) 58'; Adams (yellow card) 80'	Stadium: Home Park; Attendance: 16,978; Referee: John Busby

29 March 2025 39	Watford	0–0	Plymouth Argyle	Watford
12:30 GMT	Larouci (yellow card) 90+7'	Report	Gyabi (yellow card) 8'; Pleguezuelo (yellow card) 64'; Hazard (yellow card) 82'	Stadium: Vicarage Road; Attendance: 19,545; Referee: Ruebyn Ricardo
Note: Fixture was initially scheduled for a 15:00 kick-off, but was moved for live Sky Sports broadcast.

5 April 2025 40	Plymouth Argyle	2–1	Norwich City	Plymouth
15:00 BST	Hardie 24', 29'	Report	Sargent 46'	Stadium: Home Park; Attendance: 16,560; Referee: Gavin Ward

9 April 2025 41	Swansea City	3–0	Plymouth Argyle	Swansea
19:45 BST	O'Brien 4'; Darling 22'; Key 35'	Report	Randell (yellow card) 21'; Pleguezuelo (yellow card) 72'	Stadium: Swansea.com Stadium; Attendance: 14,978; Referee: Stephen Martin

12 April 2025 42	Plymouth Argyle	2–1	Sheffield United	Plymouth
12:30 BST	Hardie 81'; Tijani 88'; Pleguezuelo (yellow card) 90+6'	Report	Rak-Sakyi 44'; Clarke (yellow card) 64'	Stadium: Home Park; Attendance: 16,565; Referee: Oliver Langford
Note: Fixture was initially scheduled for a 15:00 kick-off, but was moved for live Sky Sports broadcast.

18 April 2025 43	Middlesbrough	2–1	Plymouth Argyle	Middlesbrough
15:00 BST	Azaz 12'; Conway 90+3' (pen.)	Report	Bundu 17'; Pleguezuelo (yellow card) 45+2'; Hazard (yellow card) 52'; Edwards (red card) 90+2'	Stadium: Riverside Stadium; Attendance: 26,276; Referee: Anthony Backhouse

21 April 2025 44	Plymouth Argyle	3–1	Coventry City	Plymouth
15:00 BST	Bundu (yellow card) 27', (goal) 40', 65'; Hardie 43'	Report	Wright 45'; Latibeaudiere (yellow card) 84'	Stadium: Home Park; Attendance: 16,974; Referee: Andy Davies

26 April 2025 45	Preston North End	1–2	Plymouth Argyle	Preston
15:00 BST	Þórðarson (yellow card) 30'; Whiteman (yellow card) 33'; Riis Jakobsen 90'; Brady (yellow card) 90+2'	Report	Bundu 14'; Pleguezuelo (yellow card) 33'; Pálsson (yellow card) 46'; Wright 75'	Stadium: Deepdale; Attendance: 19,198; Referee: Matt Donohue

3 May 2025 46	Plymouth Argyle	1–2	Leeds United	Plymouth
12:30 BST	Byram 18' (o.g.); Tijani (yellow card) 44'; Pálsson (yellow card) 84'	Report	Gnonto 53'; Piroe (yellow card) 85'; Solomon 90+1', (yellow card) 90+2'	Stadium: Home Park; Attendance: 16,758; Referee: Jeremy Simpson
Note: Fixture was initially scheduled for a 15:00 kick-off, but all EFL Championship final matchday fixtures were moved to an earlier kick-off.

=== FA Cup ===
Plymouth Argyle entered the FA Cup in the third round, and were drawn away to Brentford. In the fourth round, they were given a home tie against Liverpool. They recorded a shock 1–0 victory and subsequently progressed to the fifth round, where they were drawn away to Manchester City.

Win Draw Loss Fixtures

11 January 2025 Third round	Brentford	0–1	Plymouth Argyle	Brentford
15:00 GMT		Report	Whittaker 82'	Stadium: Brentford Community Stadium; Attendance: 16,790 (2,457 away); Referee: Ben Toner

9 February 2025 Fourth round	Plymouth Argyle	1–0	Liverpool	Plymouth
15:00 GMT	Hardie 53' (pen.); Bundu (yellow card) 70'; Sorinola (yellow card) 79'; Hazard (yellow card) 90'; Talovierov (yellow card) 90+8'	Report	Nyoni (yellow card) 18'; Mabaya (yellow card) 43'	Stadium: Home Park; Attendance: 16,724 (2,592 away); Referee: Sam Barrott

1 March 2025 Fifth round	Manchester City	3–1	Plymouth Argyle	Manchester
17:45 GMT	O'Reilly 45+1', 76'; De Bruyne 90'	Report	Talovierov 38'	Stadium: City of Manchester Stadium; Attendance: 50,044 (7,800 away); Referee: Craig Pawson

=== EFL Cup ===
On 27 June, the draw for the first round was made, with Plymouth being drawn at home against Cheltenham Town. In the second round, they were drawn away to Watford.

Win Draw Loss Fixtures

14 August 2024 First round	Plymouth Argyle	3–0	Cheltenham Town	Plymouth
19:45 BST	Waine 62'; Hardie 81'; Bundu 84'; Szűcs (yellow card) 86'	Report	Pett (yellow card) 19'; Payne (yellow card) 61'	Stadium: Home Park; Attendance: 12,058 (140 away); Referee: Tom Reeves

27 August 2024 Second round	Watford	2–0	Plymouth Argyle	Watford
19:45 BST	Rajović 17', 72'; Morris (yellow card) 41'; Dele-Bashiru (yellow card) 45'; Tikvić (yellow card) 84'	Report	Houghton (yellow card) 45+1'	Stadium: Vicarage Road; Attendance: 8,319 (671 away); Referee: Andy Davies

== Statistics ==
=== Appearances and goals ===
As of match played 3 May 2025

Players with no appearances are not included on the list
Italics indicate a loaned in player

No.	Pos	Nat	Player	Total		Championship		FA Cup		EFL Cup	
No.	Pos	Nat	Player	Apps	Goals	Apps	Goals	Apps	Goals	Apps	Goals
2	DF	(England) ENG	Bali Mumba	46	0	37+6	0	2+0	0	1+0	0
3	DF	(England) ENG	Nathanael Ogbeta	20	1	9+8	1	1+1	0	1+0	0
4	MF	(England) ENG	Jordan Houghton	32	0	15+15	0	0+1	0	1+0	0
5	DF	(Spain) ESP	Julio Pleguezuelo	29	1	23+1	1	3+0	0	2+0	0
6	DF	(Hungary) HUN	Kornél Szűcs	39	0	31+5	0	0+1	0	2+0	0
8	MF	(England) ENG	Joe Edwards	18	1	12+5	1	0+0	0	1+0	0
9	FW	(Scotland) SCO	Ryan Hardie	40	12	28+9	10	1+0	1	1+1	1
11	MF	(England) ENG	Callum Wright	40	1	14+21	1	3+0	0	2+0	0
14	FW	(Republic of Ireland) IRL	Michael Obafemi	31	2	14+16	2	0+0	0	1+0	0
15	FW	(Sierra Leone) SLE	Mustapha Bundu	42	11	27+10	10	2+1	0	1+1	1
17	DF	(Poland) POL	Tymoteusz Puchacz	18	0	12+3	0	1+2	0	0+0	0
18	MF	(England) ENG	Darko Gyabi	48	1	34+9	1	2+1	0	2+0	0
19	MF	(England) ENG	Malachi Boateng	9	0	1+7	0	1+0	0	0+0	0
20	MF	(England) ENG	Adam Randell	43	1	39+0	1	2+0	0	1+1	0
21	GK	(Northern Ireland) NIR	Conor Hazard	29	0	25+0	0	3+0	0	1+0	0
22	DF	(Zimbabwe) ZIM	Brendan Galloway	15	0	11+2	0	1+0	0	1+0	0
23	FW	(New Zealand) NZL	Ben Waine	2	1	0+1	0	0+0	0	1+0	1
25	DF	(Bosnia and Herzegovina) BIH	Nikola Katić	17	1	14+1	1	2+0	0	0+0	0
26	FW	(Nigeria) NGR	Muhamed Tijani	14	2	4+10	2	0+0	0	0+0	0
28	MF	(Sweden) SWE	Rami Al Hajj	29	3	18+10	3	0+1	0	0+0	0
29	DF	(England) ENG	Matthew Sorinola	30	0	19+6	0	3+0	0	1+1	0
30	MF	(Ghana) GHA	Michael Baidoo	13	0	4+7	0	1+1	0	0+0	0
31	GK	(England) ENG	Daniel Grimshaw	22	0	21+0	0	0+0	0	1+0	0
32	MF	(Wales) WAL	Will Jenkins-Davies	1	0	0+0	0	0+0	0	0+1	0
34	MF	(England) ENG	Caleb Roberts	6	0	2+3	0	1+0	0	0+0	0
35	FW	(Wales) WAL	Freddie Issaka	20	1	3+16	1	0+0	0	1+0	0
38	FW	(Wales) WAL	Joseph Hatch	1	0	0+1	0	0+0	0	0+0	0
39	MF	(England) ENG	Tegan Finn	4	0	1+3	0	0+0	0	0+0	0
40	DF	(Ukraine) UKR	Maksym Talovierov	13	2	10+1	1	2+0	1	0+0	0
44	DF	(Iceland) ISL	Victor Pálsson	27	0	19+6	0	1+1	0	0+0	0
Player(s) who featured whilst on loan but returned to parent club during the season:
7	FW	(Netherlands) NED	Ibrahim Cissoko	15	3	9+4	3	0+0	0	0+2	0
Player(s) who featured but departed the club permanently during the season:
10	FW	(England) ENG	Morgan Whittaker	22	4	20+0	3	1+0	1	0+1	0
17	DF	(England) ENG	Lewis Gibson	19	1	18+0	1	0+0	0	0+1	0
19	FW	(Jamaica) JAM	Andre Gray	13	3	5+8	3	0+0	0	0+0	0
27	MF	(England) ENG	Adam Forshaw	17	0	7+9	0	0+0	0	0+1	0
