= 2023–24 Plymouth Argyle F.C. season =

English football club season

Plymouth Argyle
2023–24 season
- Owner: Simon Hallett
- Chairman: Simon Hallett
- Head coach: Steven Schumacher (until 19 December); Ian Foster (until 1 April); Neil Dewsnip (interim, until end of season)
- Stadium: Home Park
- EFL Championship: 21st
- FA Cup: Fourth round
- EFL Cup: Second round
- Top goalscorer: League: Morgan Whittaker (19); All: Morgan Whittaker (20)
- Average home league attendance: 16,389
Home colours	Away colours	Third colours

The 2023–24 season was the 138th season in the history of Plymouth Argyle and their first season back in the Championship since the 2009–10 season following their promotion from League One the season before. The club participated in the Championship, the FA Cup, and the EFL Cup.

Plymouth secured survival on 4 May 2024, the final day of the season, by virtue of beating play-off chasing Hull City 1–0 at Home Park.

== First-team Squad ==
As of 27 March 2024

No.	Name	Position	Nationality	Date of birth (age)	Previous club	Fee	Contract end
Goalkeepers
1	Michael Cooper	GK	(England)	8 October 1999 (age 27)	Academy	Trainee	30 June 2025
21	Conor Hazard	GK	(Northern Ireland)	5 March 1998 (age 28)	(Scotland) Celtic	£150,000	30 June 2026
25	Callum Burton	GK	(England)	15 August 1996 (age 30)	Cambridge United	Free	30 June 2024
Defenders
2	Bali Mumba	DF	(England)	8 October 2001 (age 25)	Norwich City	1m	30 June 2027
3	Lino Sousa	DF	(England)	19 January 2005 (age 21)	Aston Villa	Loan	31 May 2024
5	Julio Pleguezuelo	DF	(Spain)	26 January 1997 (age 29)	(Netherlands) FC Twente	Free	30 June 2025
6	Dan Scarr	DF	(England)	24 December 1994 (age 31)	Walsall	Free	30 June 2025
17	Lewis Gibson	DF	(England)	19 July 2000 (age 26)	Everton	Free	30 June 2025
22	Brendan Galloway	DF	(Zimbabwe)	17 March 1996 (age 30)	Luton Town	Free	30 June 2024
31	Oscar Halls	DF	(England)	19 January 2006 (age 20)	Academy	Trainee	30 June 2024
26	Ashley Phillips	DF	(England)	26 June 2005 (age 21)	Tottenham Hotspur	Loan	31 May 2024
29	Matthew Sorinola	DF	(England)	19 February 2001 (age 25)	(Belgium) Union Saint-Gilloise	Free	30 June 2025
Midfielders
4	Jordan Houghton	MF	(England)	5 November 1995 (age 31)	Milton Keynes Dons	Free	30 June 2025
8	Joe Edwards	MF	(England)	31 October 1990 (age 36)	Walsall	Free	30 June 2025
11	Callum Wright	MF	(England)	2 May 2000 (age 26)	Blackpool	Undisclosed	30 June 2026
16	Alfie Devine	MF	(England)	1 August 2004 (age 22)	Tottenham Hotspur	Loan	31 May 2024
20	Adam Randell	MF	(England)	1 October 2000 (age 26)	Academy	Trainee	30 June 2026
27	Adam Forshaw	MF	(England)	8 October 1991 (age 35)	Norwich City	Free	30 June 2024
34	Caleb Roberts	MF	(England)	24 October 2005 (age 21)	Academy	Trainee	30 June 2024
37	Jack Matthews	MF	(England)		Academy	Trainee	30 June 2024
Forwards
9	Ryan Hardie	FW	(Scotland)	17 March 1997 (age 29)	Blackpool	Undisclosed	30 June 2026
10	Morgan Whittaker	FW	(England)	7 January 2001 (age 25)	(Wales) Swansea City	1 million	30 June 2027
14	Mickel Miller	FW	(England)	2 December 1995 (age 30)	Rotherham United	Free	30 June 2024
15	Mustapha Bundu	FW	(Sierra Leone)	28 February 1997 (age 29)	(Belgium) Anderlecht	Undisclosed	30 June 2025
23	Ben Waine	FW	(New Zealand)	11 June 2001 (age 25)	(New Zealand) Wellington Phoenix	Undisclosed	30 June 2025
35	Freddie Issaka	FW	(Wales)	28 July 2006 (age 20)	Truro City	Undisclosed	30 June 2026
Out on Loan
19	Tyreik Wright	FW	(Republic of Ireland)	22 September 2001 (age 25)	Aston Villa	Undisclosed	30 June 2024
24	Saxon Earley	DF	(England)	11 October 2002 (age 24)	Norwich City	Undisclosed	30 June 2024
30	Jack Endacott	DF	(England)	1 November 2004 (age 22)	Academy	Trainee	30 June 2024
32	Will Jenkins-Davies	MF	(Wales)	22 October 2004 (age 22)	Academy	Trainee	30 June 2024
33	Zak Baker	GK	(Scotland)	19 November 2004 (age 21)	Academy	Trainee	30 June 2024

== Statistics ==
As of 24 September 2023

No.	Pos	Nat	Player	Total		Championship		FA Cup		EFL Cup	
No.	Pos	Nat	Player	Apps	Goals	Apps	Goals	Apps	Goals	Apps	Goals
1	GK	(England) ENG	Michael Cooper	9	0	9+0	0	0+0	0	0+0	0
2	DF	(England) ENG	Bali Mumba	21	2	18+2	2	0+0	0	0+1	0
3	DF	(England) ENG	Macaulay Gillesphey	3	0	2+1	0	0+0	0	0+0	0
4	MF	(England) ENG	Jordan Houghton	21	0	18+2	0	0+0	0	0+1	0
5	DF	(Spain) ESP	Julio Pleguezuelo	16	0	10+4	0	0+0	0	2+0	0
6	DF	(England) ENG	Dan Scarr	19	1	16+2	1	0+0	0	1+0	0
7	MF	(England) ENG	Matt Butcher	15	0	2+11	0	0+0	0	2+0	0
8	MF	(England) ENG	Joe Edwards	16	1	13+3	1	0+0	0	0+0	0
9	FW	(Scotland) SCO	Ryan Hardie	18	6	13+3	6	0+0	0	0+2	0
10	FW	(England) ENG	Morgan Whittaker	22	8	20+1	8	0+0	0	0+1	0
11	MF	(England) ENG	Callum Wright	14	0	4+8	0	0+0	0	1+1	0
14	FW	(England) ENG	Mickel Miller	15	0	6+8	0	0+0	0	1+0	0
15	FW	(Sierra Leone) SLE	Mustapha Bundu	12	2	3+9	2	0+0	0	0+0	0
16	MF	(England) ENG	Lewis Warrington*	4	0	1+1	0	0+0	0	2+0	0
17	DF	(England) ENG	Lewis Gibson	18	0	18+0	0	0+0	0	0+0	0
18	MF	(Republic of Ireland) IRL	Finn Azaz	22	4	16+4	4	0+0	0	1+1	0
19	MF	(Republic of Ireland) IRL	Tyreik Wright	6	0	1+4	0	0+0	0	1+0	0
20	MF	(England) ENG	Adam Randell	21	3	13+7	3	0+0	0	0+1	0
21	GK	(Northern Ireland) NIR	Conor Hazard	12	0	12+0	0	0+0	0	0+0	0
22	DF	(Zimbabwe) ZIM	Brendan Galloway	5	0	2+3	0	0+0	0	0+0	0
23	FW	(New Zealand) NZL	Ben Waine	15	4	4+9	1	0+0	0	2+0	3
24	DF	(England) ENG	Saxon Earley	2	0	1+0	0	0+0	0	1+0	0
25	GK	(England) ENG	Callum Burton	2	0	0+0	0	0+0	0	2+0	0
28	MF	(England) ENG	Luke Cundle*	21	4	11+8	3	0+0	0	2+0	1
29	DF	(England) ENG	Kaine Kesler-Hayden*	21	0	16+3	0	0+0	0	2+0	0
34	MF	(England) ENG	Caleb Roberts	1	0	0+0	0	0+0	0	0+1	0
35	FW	(Wales) WAL	Freddie Issaka	4	0	0+2	0	0+0	0	1+1	0

=== Goals record ===
As of 24 September 2023

Rank	No.	Nat.	Po.	Name	Championship	FA Cup	EFL Cup	Total
1	10	(England)	FW	Morgan Whittaker	8	0	0	8
2	9	(Scotland)	FW	Ryan Hardie	6	0	0	6
3	18	(England)	MF	Finn Azaz	4	0	0	4
3	23	(New Zealand)	FW	Ben Waine	1	0	3	4
3	28	(England)	MF	Luke Cundle	3	0	1	4
6	20	(England)	MF	Adam Randell	3	0	0	3
7	2	(England)	DF	Bali Mumba	2	0	0	2
7	15	(Sierra Leone)	FW	Mustapha Bundu	2	0	0	2
9	6	(England)	DF	Dan Scarr	1	0	0	1
9	8	(England)	DF	Joe Edwards	1	0	0	1
Total					30	0	4	34

=== Disciplinary record ===
As of 24 September 2023

Rank	No.	Nat.	Po.	Name	Championship			FA Cup			EFL Cup			Total		
Rank	No.	Nat.	Po.	Name	Yellow card	(yellow card) (yellow-red card)	Red card	Yellow card	(yellow card) (yellow-red card)	Red card	Yellow card	(yellow card) (yellow-red card)	Red card	Yellow card	(yellow card) (yellow-red card)	Red card
1	6	(England)	DF	Dan Scarr	4	0	1	0	0	0	1	0	0	5	0	1
1	14	(England)	FW	Mickel Miller	6	0	0	0	0	0	0	0	0	6	0	0
3	2	(England)	DF	Bali Mumba	4	0	0	0	0	0	0	0	0	4	0	0
3	4	(England)	MF	Jordan Houghton	4	0	0	0	0	0	0	0	0	4	0	0
3	28	(England)	MF	Luke Cundle	3	0	0	0	0	0	1	0	0	4	0	0
3	29	(England)	DF	Kaine Kesler-Hayden	4	0	0	0	0	0	0	0	0	4	0	0
7	10	(England)	FW	Morgan Whittaker	3	0	0	0	0	0	0	0	0	3	0	0
7	17	(England)	DF	Lewis Gibson	3	0	0	0	0	0	0	0	0	3	0	0
7	20	(England)	MF	Adam Randell	3	0	0	0	0	0	0	0	0	3	0	0
10	5	(Spain)	DF	Julio Pleguezuelo	2	0	0	0	0	0	0	0	0	2	0	0
10	9	(Scotland)	FW	Ryan Hardie	2	0	0	0	0	0	0	0	0	2	0	0
10	18	(Republic of Ireland)	MF	Finn Azaz	2	0	0	0	0	0	0	0	0	2	0	0
10	1	(England)	GK	Michael Cooper	2	0	0	0	0	0	0	0	0	2	0	0
10	7	(England)	MF	Matt Butcher	1	0	0	0	0	0	1	0	0	2	0	0
10	8	(England)	DF	Joe Edwards	2	0	0	0	0	0	0	0	0	2	0	0
16	21	(Northern Ireland)	GK	Conor Hazard	1	0	0	0	0	0	0	0	0	1	0	0
16	22	(Zimbabwe)	DF	Brendan Galloway	1	0	0	0	0	0	0	0	0	1	0	0
Total					46	0	1	0	0	0	3	0	0	50	0	1

== Transfers ==
=== In ===
Date	Pos	Player	Transferred from	Fee	Ref
1 July 2023	CB	Julio Pleguezuelo (ESP)	FC Twente (NED)	Free transfer	
3 July 2023	CB	Lewis Gibson (ENG)	Everton (ENG)	Free transfer	
11 July 2023	GK	Conor Hazard (NIR)	Celtic (SCO)	Undisclosed	
17 July 2023	RW	Morgan Whittaker (ENG)	Swansea City (WAL)	£1,000,000	
21 July 2023	RB	Bali Mumba (ENG)	Norwich City (ENG)	£1,000,000	
1 September 2023	RW	Mustapha Bundu (SLE)	Anderlecht (BEL)	Undisclosed	
17 January 2024	LB	Matthew Sorinola (ENG)	Union Saint-Gilloise (BEL)	Free transfer	
19 January 2024	CM	Adam Forshaw (ENG)	Norwich City (ENG)	Free transfer	

=== Out ===
Date	Pos	Player	Transferred to	Fee	Ref
30 June 2023	RB	James Bolton (ENG)	St Mirren (SCO)	Released	
30 June 2023	RB	Finley Craske (ENG)	Torquay United (ENG)	Released	
30 June 2023	CF	Niall Ennis (ENG)	Blackburn Rovers (ENG)	Free transfer	
30 June 2023	DM	Jeffrey Forkuo (WAL)	Free agent	Released	
30 June 2023	CM	Conor Grant (ENG)	Port Vale (ENG)	Released	
30 June 2023	CF	Luke Jephcott (WAL)	St Johnstone (SCO)	Released	
30 June 2023	LB	Ryan Law (ENG)	Truro City (ENG)	Released	
30 June 2023	CM	Danny Mayor (ENG)	Fleetwood Town (ENG)	Released	
30 June 2023	GK	James Morley (ENG)	Dobwalls (ENG)	Released	
30 June 2023	GK	Adam Parkes (ENG)	Plymouth Parkway (ENG)	Released	
30 June 2023	DF	Sam N'Sapu (ENG)	Free agent	Released	
30 June 2023	CB	Brandon Pursall (ENG)	Free agent	Released	
30 June 2023	CB	James Wilson (WAL)	Bristol Rovers (ENG)	Released	
12 January 2024	CB	Macaulay Gillesphey (ENG)	Charlton Athletic (ENG)	Undisclosed	
31 January 2024	DM	Matt Butcher (ENG)	Wycombe Wanderers (ENG)	Mutual Consent	

=== Loaned in ===
Date	Pos	Player	Loaned from	Fee	Ref
1 July 2023	RB	Kaine Kesler-Hayden (ENG)	Aston Villa (ENG)	14 January 2024 (Note: On 14 January, Kesler-Hayden was recalled to Aston Villa from his season-long loan early.)	
26 July 2023	CM	Lewis Warrington (ENG)	Everton (ENG)	14 January 2024 (Note: On 14 January, Warrington returned to Everton from his season-long loan early due to injury.)	
2 August 2023	AM	Finn Azaz (IRL)	Aston Villa (ENG)	3 January 2024 (Note: On 3 January, Azaz was recalled to Aston Villa from his season-long loan early.)	
7 August 2023	CM	Luke Cundle (ENG)	Wolverhampton Wanderers (ENG)	7 January 2024 (Note: On 7 January, Cundle was recalled to Wolves from his season-long loan early.)	
8 January 2024	CB	Ashley Phillips (ENG)	Tottenham Hotspur (ENG)	End of season	
11 January 2024	CM	Darko Gyabi (ENG)	Leeds United (ENG)	27 March 2024 (Note: On 27 March, Gyabi's loan from Leeds was cut short due to a groin injury.)	
17 January 2024	AM	Alfie Devine (ENG)	Tottenham Hotspur (ENG)	End of season	
1 February 2024	LB	Lino Sousa (ENG)	Aston Villa (ENG)	End of season	

=== Loaned out ===
Date	Pos	Player	Loaned to	Until	Ref
21 July 2023	CM	Will Jenkins-Davies (WAL)	Torquay United (ENG)	End of season	
26 July 2023	CB	Oscar Halls (ENG)	Plymouth Parkway (ENG)	26 October 2023	
2 August 2023	LB	Jack Endacott (ENG)	Tiverton Town (ENG)	7 October 2023	
7 October 2023	LB	Jack Endacott (ENG)	Tavistock (ENG)	4 November 2023	
9 November 2023	GK	Zak Baker (ENG)	Tiverton Town (ENG)	7 December 2023	
15 January 2024	RW	Tyreik Wright (IRL)	Bradford City (ENG)	End of season	
1 February 2024	LB	Saxon Earley (ENG)	Wycombe Wanderers (ENG)	End of season	

== Pre-season and friendlies ==
On June 7, Plymouth Argyle announced their pre-season schedule, with friendlies against Plymouth Parkway, Torquay United, Forest Green Rovers, Salford City and Swindon Town. A week later, a trip to Spain to face Scottish side Heart of Midlothian was also confirmed.

Win Draw Loss Fixtures

6 July 2023 Friendly	Plymouth Argyle	1–0	Heart of Midlothian	Marbella, Spain
18:00 CEST; 17:00 BST	Issaka 21'	Report		Stadium: Marbella Football Centre

11 July 2023 Friendly	Plymouth Parkway	0–2	Plymouth Argyle	Manadon
19:30 BST		Report	Waine 5'; Hardie 83'	Stadium: Bolitho Park

15 July 2023 Friendly	Blackpool	1–2	Plymouth Argyle	Blackpool
15:00 BST	Lavery (pen.)	Report	Miller; Hardie	Stadium: Bloomfield Road; Referee: Leigh Doughty

18 July 2023 Friendly	Torquay United	1–1	Plymouth Argyle	Torquay
19:30 BST	Ash 76'	Report	Whittaker 29'	Stadium: Plainmoor

22 July 2023 Friendly	Plymouth Argyle	5–1	Forest Green Rovers	Plymouth
15:00 BST	Hardie 24', 29'; Mumba 38'; Wright 48'; Whittaker 59'	Report	Stevens 33'	Stadium: Harper's Park; Attendance: 0 (behind-closed-doors)

25 July 2023 Friendly	Plymouth Argyle	Cancelled	Salford City	Plymouth
19:30 BST				Stadium: Home Park
Note: Fixture was cancelled due to Home Park pitch undergoing resurfacing works.

29 July 2023 Friendly	Swindon Town	3–1	Plymouth Argyle	Swindon
15:00 BST	Kemp 57'; Hepburn-Murphy 59'; Wakeling 86'	Report	Whittaker 69'	Stadium: County Ground

== Competitions ==
=== Overall record ===
Competition	Starting round	Final position	Record							
Competition	Starting round	Final position	Pld	W	D	L	GF	GA	GD	Win %
Championship	Matchday 1		42	11	12	19	57	66	−9	26.19
FA Cup	Third round	Fourth round	3	1	1	1	5	6	−1	33.33
EFL Cup	First round	Second round	2	1	0	1	4	4	+0	50.00
Total			47	13	13	21	66	76	−10	27.66

Last updated: 9 April 2024
Source: Soccerway

=== Championship ===
==== League table ====
Pos	Team	Pld	W	D	L	GF	GA	GD	Pts	Promotion, qualification or relegation
18	Queens Park Rangers	46	15	11	20	47	58	−11	56	
19	Blackburn Rovers	46	14	11	21	60	74	−14	53	
20	Sheffield Wednesday	46	15	8	23	44	68	−24	53	
21	Plymouth Argyle	46	13	12	21	59	70	−11	51	
22	Birmingham City (R)	46	13	11	22	50	65	−15	50	Relegated to EFL League One
23	Huddersfield Town (R)	46	9	18	19	48	77	−29	45	Relegated to EFL League One
24	Rotherham United (R)	46	5	12	29	37	89	−52	27	Relegated to EFL League One

Source: EFL official website
Rules for classification: 1) Points; 2) Goal difference; 3) Number of goals scored; 4) Head-to-head results; 5) Wins; 6) Away goals; 7) Penalty points (sec 9.5); 8) Number of 12-point sending off offences; 9) Play-off (only if needed to determine promotion/relegation)
(R) Relegated

==== Results summary ====
Overall								Home						Away					
Pld	W	D	L	GF	GA	GD	Pts	W	D	L	GF	GA	GD	W	D	L	GF	GA	GD
46	13	12	21	59	70	−11	51	10	5	7	41	34	+7	3	7	14	18	36	−18

Last updated: 4 May 2024.
Source: Soccerway

==== Results by round ====
Round	1	2	3	4	5	6	7	8	9	10	11	12	13	14	15	16	17	18	19	20	21	22	23	24	25	26	27	28	30	31	32	33	29^{1}	34	35	36	37	38	39	40	41	42	43	44	45	46
Ground	H	A	H	A	H	A	A	H	A	H	H	A	H	A	H	A	H	A	H	A	A	H	H	A	A	H	A	H	A	A	H	H	H	A	H	A	A	H	A	H	A	H	H	A	A	H
Result	W	D	L	L	W	L	L	W	D	L	L	D	W	L	D	L	W	L	W	L	D	W	D	D	L	D	D	W	W	L	D	L	L	W	L	L	D	L	L	L	W	D	W	L	L	W
Position	3	4	11	16	10	14	18	12	13	16	18	21	17	19	19	19	19	20	16	18	18	16	17	16	18	18	19	15	15	15	15	16	16	15	16	16	17	18	20	21	19	20	18	20	21	21

Updated to match(es) played on 20 April 2024. Source: Soccerway
A = Away; H = Home; W = Win; D = Draw; L = Loss; P = Postponed
Notes:
- ^{1} Matchday 29 (vs West Bromwich Albion) was postponed due to both sides continued involvement in the FA Cup.

==== Matches ====
On 22 June, the EFL Championship fixtures were released.

Win Draw Loss Fixtures

5 August 2023 1	Plymouth Argyle	3–1	Huddersfield Town	Plymouth
15:00 BST	Whittaker 6'; Mumba 73'; Hardie 76'; Edwards (yellow card) 88'	Report	Helik 45+6'	Stadium: Home Park; Attendance: 16,446; Referee: Matt Donohue

12 August 2023 2	Watford	0–0	Plymouth Argyle	Watford
15:00 BST		Report	Scarr (yellow card) 71'; Mumba (yellow card) 78'	Stadium: Vicarage Road; Attendance: 19,446; Referee: Geoff Eltringham

19 August 2023 3	Plymouth Argyle	1–2	Southampton	Plymouth
12:30 BST	Scarr (yellow card) 10'; Hardie 51' (yellow card) 58'	Report	Armstrong (yellow card) 30'; Charles (yellow card) 42'; Tella 49'; Manning (yellow card) 74'; Stephens (yellow card) 90+1'; Adams 90+4'	Stadium: Home Park; Attendance: 16,392; Referee: David Webb
Note: Live on Sky Sports

26 August 2023 4	Birmingham City	2–1	Plymouth Argyle	Bordesley
15:00 BST	Hogan 8'; Sanderson (yellow card) 23'; Buchanan (yellow card) 73'; Stansfield 90+5'	Report	Randell (yellow card) 49'; Hardie 60'	Stadium: St Andrew's Stadium; Referee: John Busby

2 September 2023 5	Plymouth Argyle	3–0	Blackburn Rovers	Plymouth
15:00 BST	Azaz 27'; Whittaker (yellow card) 36'; Hardie (yellow card) 41' (goal) 77'; Cundle 80'	Report	Pickering (yellow card) 88'	Stadium: Home Park; Attendance: 16,067; Referee: Stephen Martin

16 September 2023 6	Preston North End	2–1	Plymouth Argyle	Preston
15:00 BST	Holmes 1', (yellow card) 32'; Ledson (yellow card) 22'; McCann (yellow card) 89'; Cundle 80'	Report	Miller (yellow card) 19'; Hardie 61'	Stadium: Deepdale; Attendance: 17,542; Referee: Gavin Ward

19 September 2023 7	Bristol City	4–1	Plymouth Argyle	Ashton Gate
19:45 BST	Bell 3'; James 8'; Sykes 33'; Wells (yellow card) 35'; Tanner (yellow card) 67'; Cornick 80'; Yeboah (yellow card) 90+3'	Report	Randell 26'	Stadium: Ashton Gate Stadium; Attendance: 23,017; Referee: Matt Donohue

23 September 2023 8	Plymouth Argyle	6–2	Norwich City	Plymouth
15:00 BST	Whittaker 15', 45+3', 59'; Scarr 35' (yellow card) 68'; Azaz 45+5'; Cundle 90+7'	Report	Idah 72', 78' (pen.)	Stadium: Home Park; Attendance: 16,469; Referee: Andrew Kitchen

30 September 2023 9	Hull City	1–1	Plymouth Argyle	Kingston upon Hull
15:00 BST	Slater 44'; Christie (yellow card) 90'; Delap (yellow card) 90+4'	Report	Randell 22'; Azaz (yellow card) 47'; Pleguezuelo (yellow card) 77'	Stadium: MKM Stadium; Attendance: 20,312; Referee: David Webb

3 October 2023 10	Plymouth Argyle	0–2	Millwall	Plymouth
19:45 BST	Miller (yellow card) 31'; Pleguezuelo (yellow card) 63'	Report	McNamara (yellow card) 52'; Campbell (yellow card) 54'; Cooper (yellow card) 54'; Flemming 59'; Leonard (yellow card) 89'; Wallace (yellow card) 90+4'; Norton-Cuffy (yellow card) 90+7'; Saville 90+7'	Stadium: Home Park; Attendance: 15,891; Referee: Oliver Langford

7 October 2023 11	Plymouth Argyle	1–3	Swansea City	Plymouth
15:00 BST	Cundle 18'; Whittaker (yellow card) 55'; Kesler-Hayden (yellow card) 79'	Report	Yates 56'; Cooper 68'; Key 90'	Stadium: Home Park; Attendance: 16,463; Referee: Lewis Smith

21 October 2023 12	West Bromwich Albion	0–0	Plymouth Argyle	West Bromwich
15:00 BST	Mowatt (yellow card) 35'; Bartley (yellow card) 77'	Report	Azaz (yellow card) 27'; Houghton (yellow card) 42'; Scarr (yellow card) 50'; Miller (yellow card) 55'; Mumba (yellow card) 84'; Cooper (yellow card) 85'; Kesler-Hayden (yellow card) 86'	Stadium: The Hawthorns; Attendance: 24,732; Referee: Stephen Martin

25 October 2023 13	Plymouth Argyle	3–0	Sheffield Wednesday	Plymouth
19:45 BST	Houghton (yellow card) 41'; Kesler-Hayden (yellow card) 43'; Bundu 44'; Whittaker 45+3'; Hardie 76'	Report	Iorfa (yellow card) 42'	Stadium: Home Park; Attendance: 16,225; Referee: James Linington

28 October 2023 14	Ipswich Town	3–2	Plymouth Argyle	Ipswich
15:00 BST	Luongo (yellow card) 32'; Mumba 45+1' (o.g.); Hirst 54'; Woolfenden (yellow card) 66'; Williams (yellow card) 68'; Edmundson (yellow card) 74'; Harness 86'	Report	Whittaker 7'; Miller (yellow card) 28'; Mumba (yellow card) 62'; Edwards 90+1'	Stadium: Portman Road; Attendance: 29,027; Referee: Gavin Ward

4 November 2023 15	Plymouth Argyle	3–3	Middlesbrough	Plymouth
15:00 GMT	Mumba 34'; Azaz 38'; Miller (yellow card) 70'; Cundle (yellow card) 72'; Whittaker 77'	Report	Coburn 23' (penalty missed) 60' 60' (yellow card) 62'; Crooks (yellow card) 30'; Greenwood 64'; van den Berg (yellow card) 66'	Stadium: Home Park; Attendance: 16,471; Referee: Darren England

11 November 2023 16	Leeds United	2–1	Plymouth Argyle	Leeds
15:00 GMT	James 21'; Piroe 28'; Gruev (yellow card) 90+3'	Report	Randell (yellow card) 33'; Whittaker (yellow card) 61'; Edwards (yellow card) 66'; Waine 84'; Gibson (yellow card) 89'	Stadium: Elland Road; Attendance: 36,718; Referee: Josh Smith

25 November 2023 17	Plymouth Argyle	2–0	Sunderland	Plymouth
15:00 GMT	Whittaker 24'; Cundle (yellow card) 26'; Azaz 40'; Kesler-Hayden (yellow card) 85'; Randell (yellow card) 90+1'; Mumba (yellow card) 90+2'	Report	O'Nien (yellow card) 85'	Stadium: Home Park; Attendance: 16,457; Referee: James Bell

28 November 2023 18	Coventry City	1–0	Plymouth Argyle	Coventry
19:45 GMT	Wright 75'; Bidwell (yellow card) 90+3'	Report	Houghton (yellow card) 76'; Cooper (yellow card) 76'; Gibson (yellow card) 83'	Stadium: Coventry Building Society Arena; Attendance: 22,790; Referee: Andy Davies

2 December 2023 19	Plymouth Argyle	2–1	Stoke City	Plymouth
15:00 GMT	Houghton (yellow card) 7'; Bundu 43'; Randell 90+7'	Report	Campbell 23'; Vidigal (yellow card) 57'; Pearson (yellow card) 63'	Stadium: Home Park; Attendance: 16,371; Referee: Sam Barrott

9 December 2023 20	Leicester City	4–0	Plymouth Argyle	Leicester
15:00 GMT	Mavididi 14' (pen.), 52'; Daka 49'; Ndidi 55'	Report	Gibson (yellow card) 42'; Miller (yellow card) 44'; Galloway (yellow card) 67'	Stadium: King Power Stadium; Attendance: 31,265; Referee: Sunny Sukhvir Gill

13 December 2023 21	Queens Park Rangers	0–0	Plymouth Argyle	Shepherd's Bush
19:45 GMT	Field (yellow card) 2'; Paal (yellow card) 31'	Report	Scarr (red card) 25'; Cundle (yellow card) 86'; Butcher (yellow card) 90+3'; Hazard (yellow card) 90+6'	Stadium: Loftus Road; Attendance: 16,339; Referee: Tony Harrington

16 December 2023 22	Plymouth Argyle	3–2	Rotherham United	Plymouth
15:00 GMT	Azaz 45+5' (pen.), 52'; Whittaker 90+6'	Report	Lindsay 16', (yellow card) 49'; Ayala (yellow card) 25' (yellow-red card) 55'; Odoffin (yellow card) 36'; Nombe (yellow card) 45+3'; Eaves 77'; Rathbone (yellow card) 90+2'; Johansson (yellow card) 90+3'	Stadium: Home Park; Attendance: 16,025; Referee: Gavin Ward

23 December 2023 23	Plymouth Argyle	3–3	Birmingham City	Plymouth
15:00 GMT	Edwards (yellow card) 26', (goal) 43'; Waine 68'; Whittaker 86'; Randell (yellow card) 90+1'	Report	Stansfield 15', (yellow card) 16'; James 39', (yellow card) 70'; Longelo (yellow card) 60'; Bacuna 62', (yellow card) 62'; Miyoshi (yellow card) 87'	Stadium: Home Park; Attendance: 16,589; Referee: Graham Scott

26 December 2023 24	Cardiff City	2–2	Plymouth Argyle	Cardiff
15:00 GMT	Butcher 31' (o.g.); Grant 47'	BBC report Sky report	Whittaker 18', 66'; Gibson (yellow card) 44'	Stadium: Cardiff City Stadium; Attendance: 23,583; Referee: Andy Davies

29 December 2023 25	Southampton	2–1	Plymouth Argyle	Southampton
18:00 GMT	Alcaraz 56'; Adams 63'	BBC report	Hardie 90+1'	Stadium: St Mary's Stadium; Attendance: 30,559; Referee: James Linington

1 January 2024 26	Plymouth Argyle	3–3	Watford	Plymouth
15:00 GMT	Azaz 20'; Whittaker 27'; Hardie 42'; Mumba (yellow card) 59'; Randell (yellow card) 86'	Report	Kayembe 11'; Koné 38'; Livermore (yellow card) 43'; Andrews 57'; Healey (yellow card) 87'; Asprilla (yellow card) 88'; Matheus Martins (yellow card) 88'	Stadium: Home Park; Attendance: 16,355; Referee: Bobby Madley

13 January 2024 27	Huddersfield Town	1–1	Plymouth Argyle	Huddersfield
15:00 GMT	Koroma 38'; Thomas (yellow card) 50'	Report	Whittaker 12'; Wright (yellow card) 26'; Hazard (yellow card) 62'; Phillips (yellow card) 64'; Randell (yellow card) 75'	Stadium: Kirklees Stadium; Attendance: 20,253; Referee: Tom Nield

20 January 2024 28	Plymouth Argyle	3–1	Cardiff City	Plymouth
15:00 GMT	Hardie 31', 52'; Phillips (yellow card) 35'; Miller (yellow card) 41'; Mumba (yellow card) 50'; Scarr (yellow card) 61'; Whittaker 81'	Report	Ng 10', (yellow card) 38'; Mëïté (yellow card) 36'	Stadium: Home Park; Attendance: 16,471; Referee: Steve Martin

3 February 2024 30	Swansea City	0–1	Plymouth Argyle	Landore
15:00 GMT	Cabango (yellow card) 22'; Cooper (yellow card) 71'	Report	Whittaker 18'; Hazard (yellow card) 71'; Gyabi (yellow card) 76'; Miller (yellow card) 82'	Stadium: Swansea.com Stadium; Attendance: 16,965; Referee: Sam Allison

10 February 2024 31	Sunderland	3–1	Plymouth Argyle	Sunderland
15:00 GMT	Ba (yellow card) 10'; Ekwah 52'; Clarke 59'; Bellingham 67'	Report	Whittaker (yellow card) 24'; Phillips (yellow card) 33'; Hardie 39'; Mumba (yellow card) 44'; Gyabi (yellow card) 69'; Sorinola (yellow card) 87'	Stadium: Stadium of Light; Attendance: 41,269; Referee: Anthony Backhouse

14 February 2024 32	Plymouth Argyle	2–2	Coventry City	Plymouth
19:45 GMT	Randell (yellow card) 18'; Whittaker 55'; Miller 68'	Report	Simms (yellow card) 63', (goal) 66': Latibeaudiere (yellow card) 75'; Thomas (yellow card) 85'; Kitching 90+6'	Stadium: Home Park; Attendance: 16,799; Referee: Keith Stroud

17 February 2024 33	Plymouth Argyle	0–2	Leeds United	Plymouth
12:30 GMT	Randell (yellow card) 38'; Gibson (yellow card) 53'	Report	Gnonto 10'; Rutter 72'; Rodon (yellow card) 88'	Stadium: Home Park; Attendance: 16,818; Referee: Matt Donohue
Note: Fixture was originally set for a 15:00 kick-off, but was pushed forward for live Sky Sports coverage.

20 February 2024 29	Plymouth Argyle	0–3	West Bromwich Albion	Plymouth
19:45 GMT		Report	Kipre 61'; Johnston 76'; Fellows 90+1'	Stadium: Home Park; Referee: Tom Nield
Note: Fixture was originally scheduled for 27 January, but was postponed due to both sides continued involvement in the FA Cup.

24 February 2024 34	Middlesbrough	0–2	Plymouth Argyle	Middlesbrough
15:00 GMT	Ayling (yellow card) 37'	Report	Sorinola 7'; Miller (yellow card) 26'; Hardie 31'	Stadium: Riverside Stadium; Attendance: 25,578; Referee: Sunny Sukhvir Gill

2 March 2024 35	Plymouth Argyle	0–2	Ipswich Town	Plymouth
15:00 GMT	Galloway (yellow card) 72'	Report	Sarmiento (yellow card) 59'; Galloway 63' (o.g.); Chaplin (yellow card) 71'; Moore 74'; Travis (yellow card) 78'	Stadium: Home Park; Attendance: 16,871; Referee: Josh Smith

5 March 2024 36	Sheffield Wednesday	1–0	Plymouth Argyle	Owlerton
19:45 GMT	Gassama 60'; Diaby (yellow card) 89'	Report	Forshaw (yellow card) 45'; Randell (yellow card) 58'	Stadium: Hillsborough Stadium; Attendance: 23,037; Referee: Stephen Martin
Note: Fixture was originally scheduled for 6 March, but was brought forward 24 hours for live Sky Sports coverage.

9 March 2024 37	Blackburn Rovers	1–1	Plymouth Argyle	Blackburn
15:00 GMT	Szmodics 7'; Brittain (yellow card) 33'; McFadzean (red card) 54'; Ayari (yellow card) 90'	Report	Mumba (yellow card) 56'; Whittaker 74'	Stadium: Ewood Park; Attendance: 14,108; Referee: Andrew Kitchen

16 March 2024 38	Plymouth Argyle	0–1	Preston North End	Plymouth
15:00 GMT	Miller (yellow card) 41'; Sousa (yellow card) 63'	Report	Keane (yellow card) 17'; Millar 43'; McCann (yellow card) 75'	Stadium: Home Park; Attendance: 16,076 1049 away Referee: John Busby

29 March 2024 39	Norwich City	2–1	Plymouth Argyle	Norwich
15:00 GMT	Sargent 67'; Phillips 74' (o.g.)	Report	Whittaker 10'; Randell (yellow card) 18'; Sorinola (yellow card) 30'; Miller (yellow card) 35'; Devine (yellow card) 70'; Houghton (yellow card) 70'; Forshaw (yellow card) 80'; Pleguezuelo (yellow card) 82'	Stadium: Carrow Road; Attendance: 26,622; Referee: James Linington

1 April 2024 40	Plymouth Argyle	0–1	Bristol City	Plymouth
15:00 BST	Devine (yellow card) 54' (yellow-red card) 78'; Gibson (yellow card) 62'; Houghton (yellow card) 90'	Report	Twine (yellow card) 28'; Wells 57', (yellow card) 90+6'; Pring (yellow card) 88'	Stadium: Home Park; Attendance: 16,866; Referee: Keith Stroud

5 April 2024 41	Rotherham United	0–1	Plymouth Argyle	Rotherham
20:00 BST		Report	Mumba 32'	Stadium: New York Stadium; Attendance: 9,863; Referee: Oliver Langford
Note: Fixture was initially scheduled for 6 April, but was moved for live Sky Sports coverage.

9 April 2024 42	Plymouth Argyle	1–1	Queens Park Rangers	Plymouth
19:45 BST	Adomah 85' (o.g.)	Report	Dykes (yellow card) 42'; Field 73'; Willock (yellow card) 90+6'	Stadium: Home Park; Attendance: 16,928; Referee: Jeremy Simpson

12 April 2024 43	Plymouth Argyle	1–0	Leicester City	Plymouth
20:00 BST	Bundu 21'; Miller (yellow card) 30'; Forshaw (yellow card) 41'; Hardie (yellow card) 49'; Whittaker (yellow card) 50'; Waine (yellow card) 90+1'	Report	Ndidi (yellow card) 45+4'; Vestergaard (yellow card) 69'	Stadium: Home Park; Attendance: 16,861; Referee: Robert Jones
Note: Fixture was initially scheduled for 13 April, but was moved for live Sky Sports coverage.

20 April 2024 44	Stoke City	3–0	Plymouth Argyle	Stoke-on-Trent
15:00 BST	Wilmot (yellow card) 26'; Campbell (yellow card) 36'; Hoever (yellow card) 36', (goal) 43'; Manhoef 45+2'; Burger 90+3'	Report	Cooper (yellow card) 35'; Mumba (yellow card) 36'; Scarr (yellow card) 62'; Devine (yellow card) 69'	Stadium: bet365 Stadium; Attendance: 24,674; Referee: Bobby Madley

27 April 2024 45	Millwall	1–0	Plymouth Argyle	Bermondsey
15:00 BST	Cooper 83'	Report		Stadium: The Den; Attendance: 17,863; Referee: Andy Davies

4 May 2024 46	Plymouth Argyle	1–0	Hull City	Plymouth
12:30 BST	Edwards 40'	Report		Stadium: Home Park; Attendance: 16,881; Referee: Darren Bond

=== FA Cup ===
Plymouth joined the competition in the third round, and were drawn at home to Sutton United, then away to Leeds United in the fourth round.

Win Draw Loss Fixtures

6 January 2024 Third round	Plymouth Argyle	3–1	Sutton United	Plymouth
15:00 GMT	Cundle 18'; Edwards (yellow card) 65'; Hardie 68' (pen.); Whittaker 90+1'		Kizzi (yellow card) 34'; Angol 50'; Clay (yellow card) 60'	Stadium: Home Park; Attendance: 15,643; Referee: Will Finnie

27 January 2024 Fourth round	Leeds United	1–1	Plymouth Argyle	Leeds
15:00 GMT	Anthony 31', (yellow card) 31'		Randell 73'	Stadium: Elland Road; Attendance: 35,247; Referee: Lewis Smith

6 February 2024 Fourth round replay	Plymouth Argyle	1–4 (a.e.t.)	Leeds United	Plymouth
19:45 GMT	Wright (yellow card) 58'; Galloway 78'; Phillips (yellow card) 80'	Report	Gnonto 66'; Rodon (yellow card) 70'; Summerville 97'; Rutter 111'; Hardie 117' (o.g.)	Stadium: Home Park; Referee: Rob Jones

=== EFL Cup ===
Plymouth were drawn at home to Leyton Orient in the first round and to Crystal Palace in the second round.

Win Draw Loss Fixtures

8 August 2023 First round	Plymouth Argyle	2–0	Leyton Orient	Plymouth
19:45 BST	Waine 25', 38' Cundle (yellow card) 48'	Report		Stadium: Home Park; Attendance: 10,324; Referee: Sunny Sukhvir Gill

29 August 2023 Second round	Plymouth Argyle	2–4	Crystal Palace	Plymouth
19:45 BST	Waine 6' Cundle 46'	Report	Édouard 58'; Mateta 61', 62', 83'	Stadium: Home Park; Attendance: 15,826; Referee: Dean Whitestone
