= Will Jenkins-Davies =

Welsh footballer (born 2004)

Will Jenkins Davies
Personal information
- Full name: William Iwan Jenkins Davies
- Date of birth: 22 October 2004 (age 22)
- Place of birth: Torquay, Devon, England
- Position: Midfielder

Team information
- Current team: Weston-super-Mare

Youth career
- –2021: Plymouth Argyle

Senior career*
Years	Team	Apps	(Gls)
2021–2025	Plymouth Argyle	3	(0)
2023–2024	→ Torquay United (loan)	33	(7)
2024–2025	→ Torquay United (loan)	34	(6)
2025–2026	Bath City	22	(7)
2026–	Weston-super-Mare	0	(0)

International career^{‡}
- Wales U16
- Wales U17
- Wales U18
- * Club domestic league appearances and goals as of 09:25, 17 April 2026 (UTC) ‡ National team caps and goals as of 21:47, 17 November 2021 (UTC)

William Iwan Jenkins Davies (born 22 October 2004) is a professional footballer who plays as a midfielder for National League South side Weston-super-Mare.

== Early life and education ==
Jenkins Davies attended Torquay Boys' Grammar School.

== Club career ==
He joined Plymouth Argyle's academy at under-nine level. He made his professional debut on 31 August 2021 as a substitute in a 2–0 EFL Trophy defeat to Newport County. He signed his first professional contract with the club on 22 October 2021, his 17th birthday. He made his league debut as a late substitute in a 4–1 win away to Accrington Stanley on 13 November. He turned professional at the end of the 2022–23 season.

In July 2023 Jenkins Davies joined National League South club Torquay United on loan. Having had his loan spell cut short due to injury, he returned to Torquay upon his return to fitness in December 2023.

On 17 September 2024, Jenkins-Davies returned to Torquay United on loan until January 2025.

In June 2025, Jenkins-Davies agreed to sign for National League South club Bath City upon the expiry of his contract with Plymouth Argyle.

On 8 July 2026, following Bath City's relegation, Jenkins-Davies signed for National League South side Weston-super-Mare for an undisclosed fee.

== International career ==
Jenkins Davies scored on his debut for the Wales national under-16 team in October 2019 after coming on as a substitute in a 4–0 win over Republic of Ireland. He was called up to the Wales under-17 side for the first time in March 2021. He received a call-up to the Wales under-18 team in September 2021.

== Career statistics ==
As of end of 2025–26 season

Appearances and goals by club, season and competition
Club	Season	League			FA Cup		EFL Cup		Other		Total	
Club	Season	Division	Apps	Goals	Apps	Goals	Apps	Goals	Apps	Goals	Apps	Goals
Plymouth Argyle	2021–22	League One	1	0	0	0	0	0	3 (Note: Appearances in EFL Trophy)	0	4	0
Plymouth Argyle	2022–23	League One	2	0	1	0	0	0	4	1	7	1
Plymouth Argyle	2023–24	Championship	0	0	0	0	0	0	—		0	0
Plymouth Argyle	2024–25	Championship	0	0	0	0	1	0	—		1	0
Plymouth Argyle	Total		3	0	1	0	1	0	7	1	12	1
Torquay United (loan)	2023–24	National League South	33	7	1	0	—		2 (Note: Appearances in FA Trophy)	1	36	8
Torquay United (loan)	2024–25	National League South	34	6	0	0	—		5 (Note: Three appearances in FA Trophy, one appearance in Devon St Lukes Challenge Cup, one appearance in National League South play-offs)	0	39	6
Bath City	2025–26	National League South	22	7	1	1	—		2	0	25	8
Career total			92	20	3	1	1	0	16	2	112	23
