= Luke Cundle =

English footballer (born 2002)

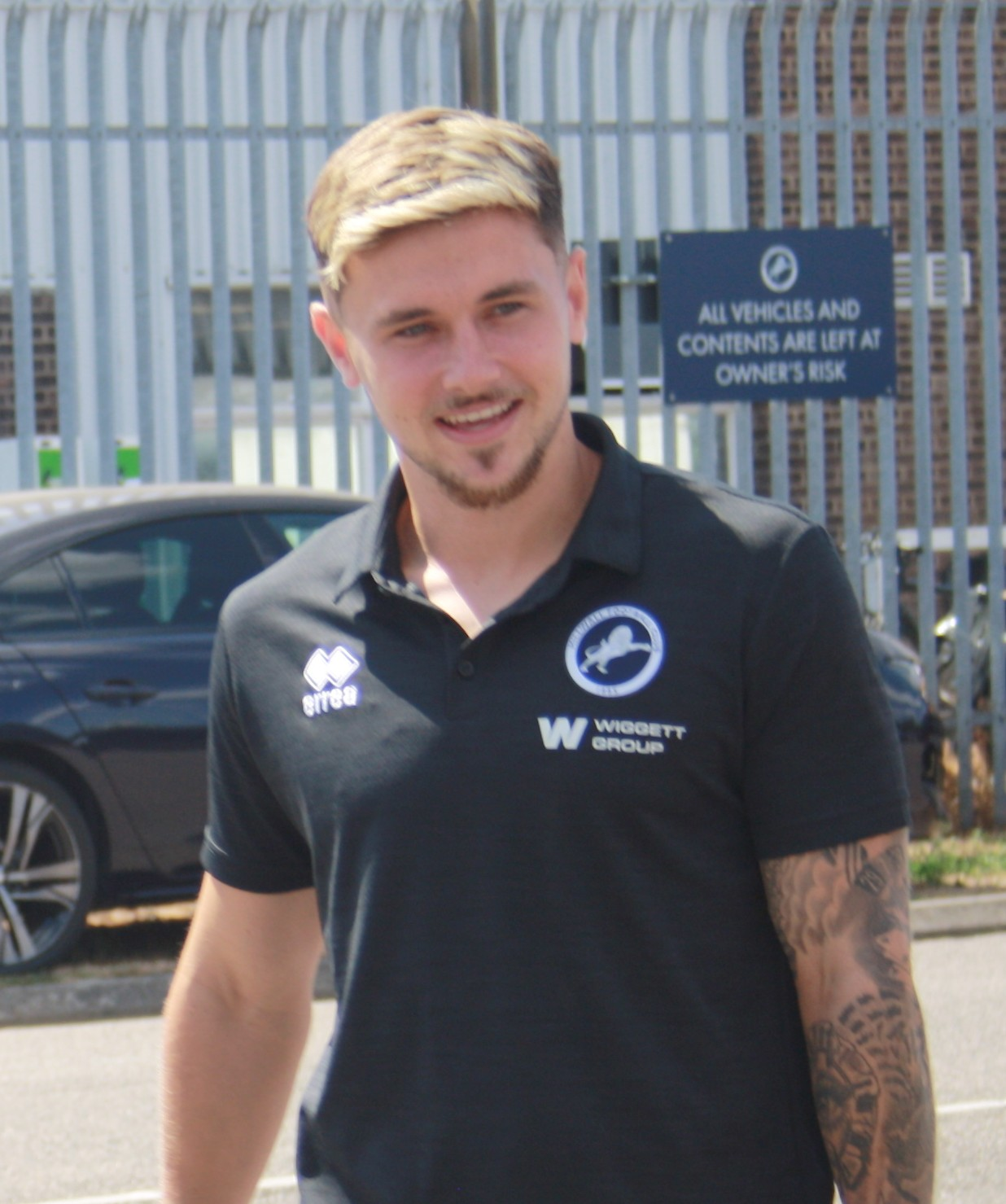
- Luke Cundle in 2026

Personal information
- Full name: Luke James Cundle
- Date of birth: 26 April 2002 (age 24)
- Place of birth: Warrington, England
- Height: 1.70 m (5 ft 7 in)
- Position: Attacking midfielder

Team information
- Current team: Millwall
- Number: 25

Youth career
- 2010–2012: Warrington Town
- 2012–2014: Burnley
- 2014–2019: Wolverhampton Wanderers

Senior career*
Years	Team	Apps	(Gls)
2019–2025	Wolverhampton Wanderers	4	(0)
2022–2023	→ Swansea City (loan)	32	(3)
2023–2024	→ Plymouth Argyle (loan)	24	(3)
2024	→ Stoke City (loan)	16	(2)
2025–	Millwall	54	(7)
- * Club domestic league appearances and goals as of 21:32, 31 October 2026 (UTC)

Luke James Cundle (born 26 April 2002) is an English footballer who plays as an attacking midfielder for EFL Championship club Millwall.

== Career ==
=== Wolverhampton Wanderers ===
Cundle was born in Warrington and played in the youth teams at Warrington Town where he then played in Burnley's academy before joining Wolverhampton Wanderers in 2014 at the age of 12. He made his first team debut for Wolves, on 25 September 2019 as a substitute in a EFL Cup victory against Reading. He had been part of the club's pre-season tour of China, where he played in the Premier League Asia Trophy Final victory against Manchester City. Cundle made his second senior appearance for Wolves as a second-half substitute in a 4–0 away win over Nottingham Forest in the EFL Cup 2nd round on 24 August 2021.

Cundle made his third senior appearance for Wolves as a late substitute in a 3–0 victory over Sheffield United at Molineux in the 3rd round of the 2021–22 FA Cup on 9 January 2022. On 15 January 2022, he made his Premier League debut, when he appeared as a stoppage time substitute in a 3–1 win over Southampton at Molineux. Cundle made his full debut in the Premier League in 2–0 win away to Tottenham Hotspur on 13 February 2022.

On 29 August 2022, Cundle joined Championship side Swansea City on loan for the 2022–23 season. He played 34 times for the Swans scoring twice as they finished in tenth position. On 7 August 2023, Cundle joined newly promoted Plymouth Argyle on loan for the 2023–24 season. After scoring five goals in 27 appearances for Argyle, Cundle was recalled by Wolves and loaned out to Stoke City for the remainder of the 2023–24 season linking back up with Steven Schumacher who had left Plymouth for Stoke. Cundle came off the bench to score in a 1–1 draw against relegation rivals Sheffield Wednesday on 13 April 2024.

=== Millwall ===
On 31 January 2025, Cundle signed for Championship side Millwall on a long-term contract for an undisclosed fee, believed to be just over £1million. He made his debut the following day, scoring the winner in a 2–1 victory over Queens Park Rangers.

== Career statistics ==
As of match played 31 October 2026

Appearances and goals by club, season and competition
Club	Season	League			FA Cup		League Cup		Other		Total	
Club	Season	Division	Apps	Goals	Apps	Goals	Apps	Goals	Apps	Goals	Apps	Goals
Wolverhampton Wanderers	2019–20	Premier League	0	0	0	0	1	0	0	0	1	0
Wolverhampton Wanderers	2020–21	Premier League	0	0	0	0	0	0	—		0	0
Wolverhampton Wanderers	2021–22	Premier League	4	0	1	0	1	0	—		6	0
Wolverhampton Wanderers	2022–23	Premier League	0	0	0	0	0	0	—		0	0
Wolverhampton Wanderers	2023–24	Premier League	0	0	0	0	0	0	—		0	0
Wolverhampton Wanderers	2024–25	Premier League	0	0	0	0	0	0	—		0	0
Wolverhampton Wanderers	Total		4	0	1	0	2	0	0	0	7	0
Wolverhampton Wanderers U21s	2019–20	—			—		—		1 (Note: Appearances in EFL Trophy)	0	1	0
Wolverhampton Wanderers U21s	2020–21	—			—		—		3	0	3	0
Wolverhampton Wanderers U21s	2024–25	—			—		—		1	0	1	0
Wolverhampton Wanderers U21s	Total		—		—		—		5	0	5	0
Swansea City (loan)	2022–23	Championship	32	2	2	0	0	0	—		34	2
Plymouth Argyle (loan)	2023–24	Championship	24	3	1	1	2	1	—		27	5
Stoke City (loan)	2023–24	Championship	16	2	0	0	0	0	—		16	2
Millwall	2024–25	Championship	16	1	2	0	1	0	—		19	1
Millwall	2025–26	Championship	28	4	0	0	2	0	2 (Note: Appearances in EFL Championship play-offs)	0	32	4
Millwall	2026–27	Championship	10	2	0	0	2	1	—		12	3
Millwall	Total		54	7	2	0	5	1	2	0	63	8
Career total			130	14	6	1	9	2	7	0	152	17
