= Morgan Whittaker =

English footballer

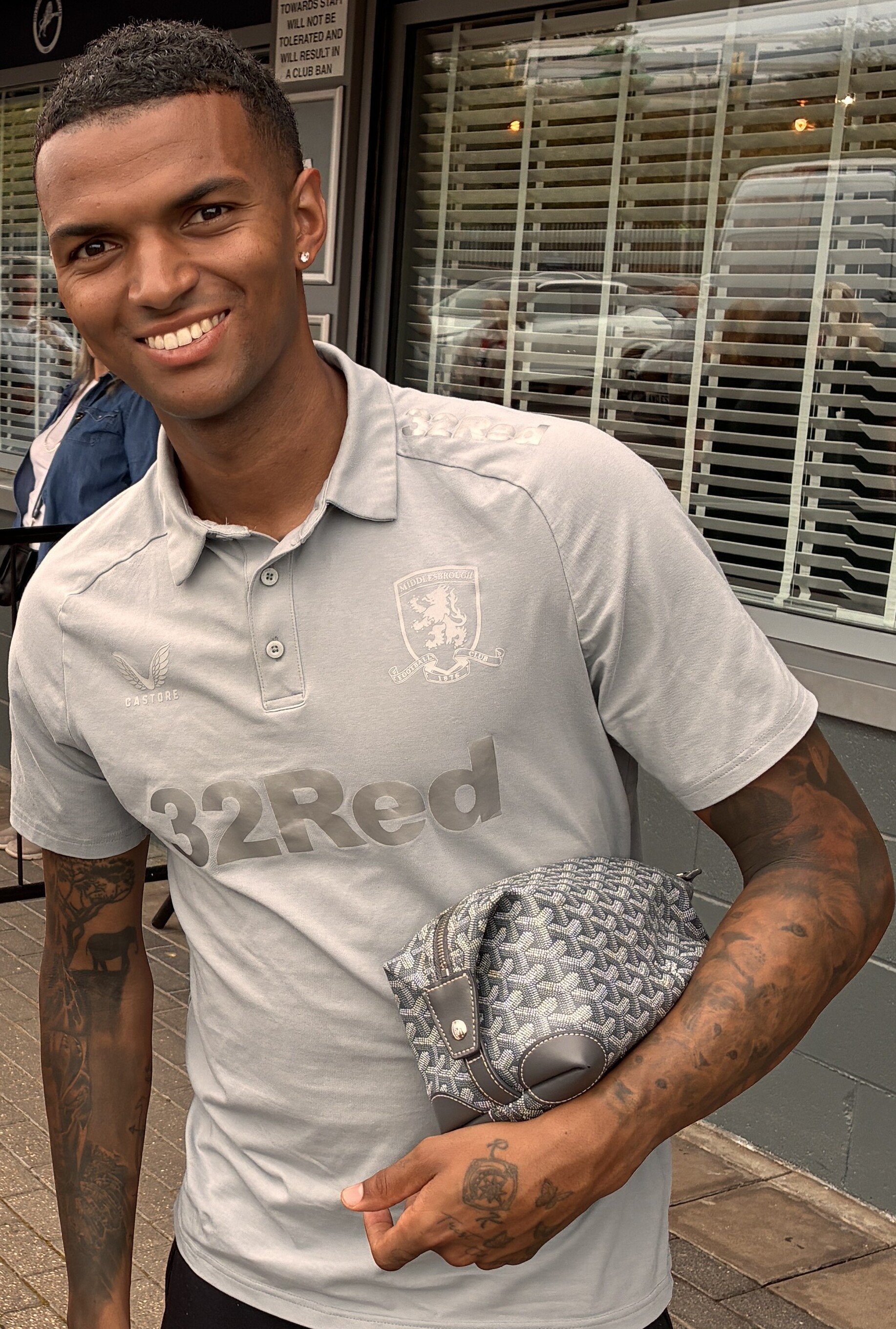
- Whittaker in 2025

Personal information
- Full name: Morgan Reece Whittaker
- Date of birth: 7 January 2001 (age 25)
- Place of birth: Derby, England
- Height: 6 ft 0 in (1.83 m)
- Position: Winger

Team information
- Current team: Colorado Rapids
- Number: 7

Youth career
- –2019: Derby County

Senior career*
Years	Team	Apps	(Gls)
2019–2021	Derby County	25	(1)
2021–2023	Swansea City	33	(2)
2022	→ Lincoln City (loan)	20	(5)
2022–2023	→ Plymouth Argyle (loan)	25	(9)
2023–2025	Plymouth Argyle	66	(22)
2025–2026	Middlesbrough	59	(14)
2026–	Colorado Rapids	10	(6)

International career^{‡}
2017	England U16	3	(3)
2017	England U17	1	(0)
2018–2019	England U18	9	(1)
2019	England U19	2	(0)
2020	England U20	1	(0)
- * Club domestic league appearances and goals as of 15:06, 9 November 2026 (UTC) ‡ National team caps and goals as of 20:35, 13 October 2020 (UTC)

Morgan Reece Whittaker (born 7 January 2001) is an English professional footballer who plays as an attacking midfielder or right winger for Major League Soccer club Colorado Rapids.

Whittaker began his playing career at Derby County's academy before making his senior debut for the club in August 2019.

== Club career ==
=== Derby County ===
On 12 August 2019, Whittaker made his professional debut as an 87th-minute substitute in the EFL Cup for Derby County against Scunthorpe United and made his first start in a 3–0 defeat away to Nottingham Forest in the same competition. He signed a new contract with Derby running until June 2023 on 22 January 2020. Whittaker finished the season with three starts and eighteen substitute appearances and scored his first career goal with the second Derby goal in a 3–1 win away to Birmingham City on the final day.

Whittaker started the 2020–21 season by scoring the winning-penalty in a 3–2 shootout victory over Barrow in the EFL Cup and continued making frequent substitute appearances throughout the course of the season.

=== Swansea City ===
On 1 February 2021, Whittaker joined fellow Championship side Swansea City on a four-and-a-half-year deal. Nine days later, Whittaker scored on his debut for the Swans in a 3–1 home defeat by Premier League side Manchester City in the FA Cup. His first league goal came on 1 May 2021 in the penultimate game of the season to equalise in an eventual 2–1 victory over Derby County that kept his former side firmly in the relegation battle.

On 24 August 2021, Whittaker scored a hat-trick in a 4–1 win over Plymouth Argyle in the second round of the EFL Cup. It was the first hat-trick scored by a Swansea player since Scott Sinclair in the 2011 Championship play-off final.

==== Lincoln City (loan) ====
On 1 January 2022, Whittaker joined Lincoln City on loan for the remainder of the season. He made his debut against Oxford United on 8 January 2022, starting and scoring in the game.

==== Plymouth Argyle (loan) ====
On 20 July 2022, Whittaker joined Plymouth Argyle on a season-long loan deal. Having scored three vital goals and claiming an assist across September 2022, Whittaker was awarded the EFL League One Player of the Month Award with Argyle sitting top of the league.

On 4 January 2023 Swansea City exercised their recall clause in his season-long loan. Whittaker had scored nine goals and created seven assists in 25 third-tier appearances since moving to Home Park in July 2022.

=== Return to Plymouth Argyle ===
On 17 July 2023, Whittaker returned to Plymouth Argyle in a deal reported to be worth around £1 million plus add-ons – a record fee for the club.

Whittaker would go on to score on his debut in a 3–1 win over Huddersfield Town.

On 23 September 2023, Whittaker scored a hat-trick for Argyle in a 6–2 win against Norwich City.

Whittaker was awarded the EFL Championship Player of the Month award for January 2024, having scored in four out of five of the club's league fixtures. His performances throughout the season earned him a place in the EFL Championship Team of the Season after scoring 20 goals in 50 appearances in all competitions. He was later named as the club's Player of the Season.

On 21 January 2025, Whittaker missed Plymouth's 5–0 defeat to Burnley with manager Miron Muslic saying that Whittaker had not shown up in time for the game despite being selected amidst rumours of a potential transfer departure. Whittaker has denied these claims.

=== Middlesbrough ===
On 24 January 2025, Whittaker joined Middlesbrough for an undisclosed fee, which has been reported to be £5 million plus £2.5 million worth of add-ons. On 17 October 2025, he scored his first goal for the club, netting the decisive score in a 2–1 win over Ipswich Town.

=== Colorado Rapids ===
On 4 September 2026, Whittaker moved to Major League Soccer side Colorado Rapids on a Designated Player contract through the 2029–30 season with an option for a further year. The deal was worth a reported $10.7 million, which was a club-record fee.

On 19 September 2026, Whittaker scored his first goals for the club, bagging a brace in a 3–3 home draw against the Seattle Sounders.

== International career ==
Having represented England at U16 to U20 level, Whittaker made his U19 debut on 9 September 2019 during a 1–0 defeat to Germany in Haiger.

On 13 October 2020, Whittaker made his debut for the England U20s during a 2–0 victory over Wales at St. George's Park.

== Career statistics ==
As of match played 7 November 2026

Appearances and goals by club, season and competition
Club	Season	League			National cup (Note: Includes FA Cup, U.S. Open Cup)		League cup (Note: Includes EFL Cup)		Other		Total	
Club	Season	Division	Apps	Goals	Apps	Goals	Apps	Goals	Apps	Goals	Apps	Goals
Derby County	2019–20	Championship	16	1	3	0	2	0	—		21	1
Derby County	2020–21	Championship	9	0	0	0	2	0	—		11	0
Derby County	Total		25	1	3	0	4	0	—		32	1
Swansea City	2020–21	Championship	12	1	1	1	—		0	0	13	2
Swansea City	2021–22	Championship	6	0	0	0	3	3	—		9	3
Swansea City	2022–23	Championship	15	1	0	0	0	0	—		15	1
Swansea City	Total		33	2	1	1	3	3	0	0	37	6
Lincoln City (loan)	2021–22	League One	20	5	—		—		—		20	5
Plymouth Argyle (loan)	2022–23	League One	25	9	1	0	1	0	4	0	31	9
Plymouth Argyle	2023–24	Championship	46	19	3	1	1	0	0	0	50	20
Plymouth Argyle	2024–25	Championship	20	3	1	1	1	0	0	0	22	4
Plymouth Argyle	Total		91	31	5	2	3	0	4	0	103	33
Middlesbrough	2024–25	Championship	16	0	—		—		—		16	0
Middlesbrough	2025–26	Championship	40	14	1	0	1	0	3 (Note: Appearances in EFL Championship play-offs)	0	45	14
Middlesbrough	2026–27	Championship	3	0	—		2	0	—		5	0
Middlesbrough	Total		59	14	1	0	3	0	3	0	66	14
Colorado Rapids	2026	MLS	10	6	1	0	—		—		11	6
Career total			238	59	11	3	13	3	7	0	269	65

== Honours ==
Plymouth Argyle

- EFL League One: 2022–23
- EFL Trophy runner up: 2022–23

Individual

- EFL League One Player of the Month: September 2022
- EFL Championship Player of the Month: January 2024
- EFL Championship Team of the Season: 2023–24
- Plymouth Argyle Player of the Season: 2023–24
