= Ashley Phillips =

English footballer (born 2005)

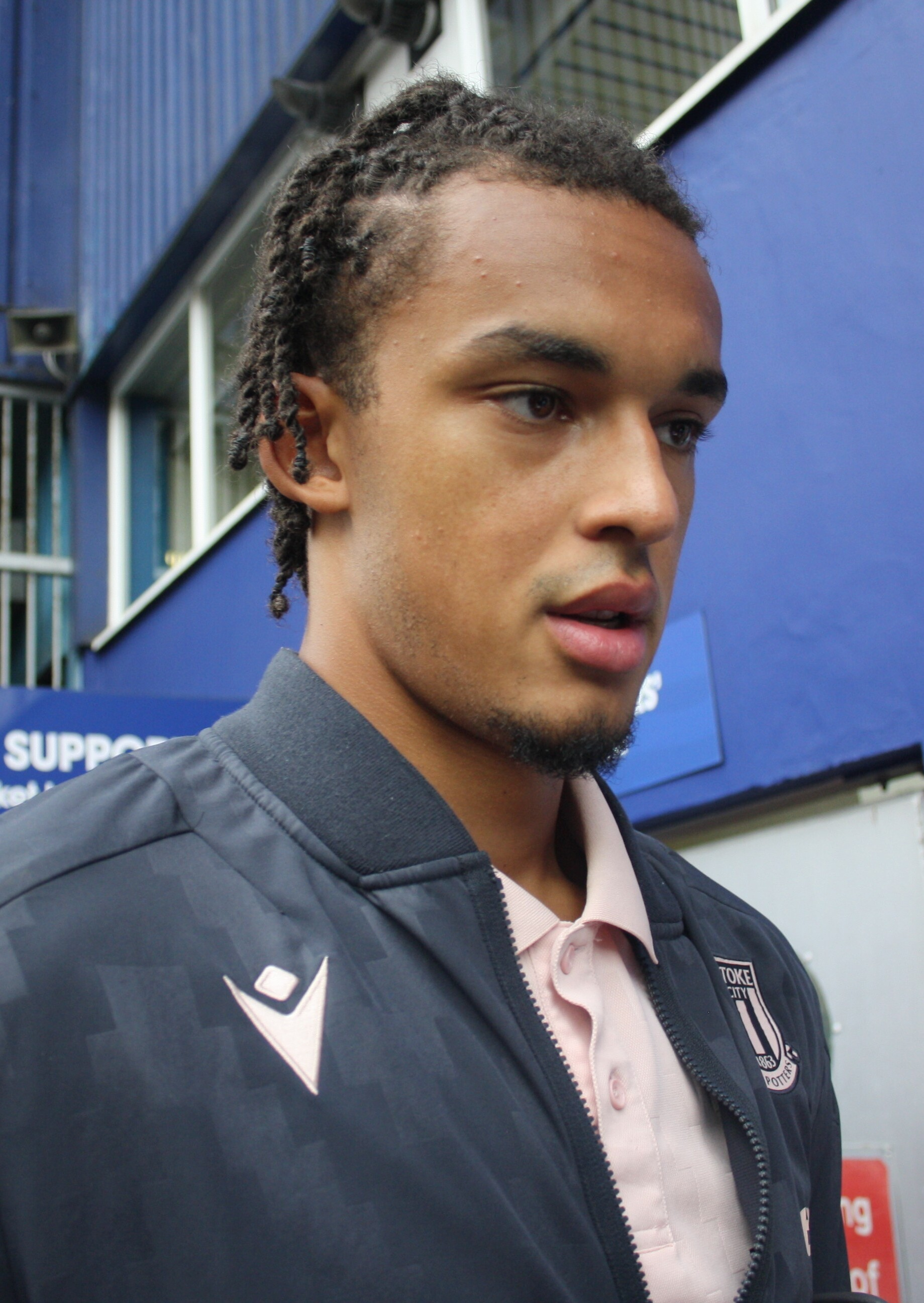
- Phillips with Stoke City in 2025

Personal information
- Full name: Ashley Phillips
- Date of birth: 26 June 2005 (age 21)
- Place of birth: Manchester, England
- Height: 6 ft 4 in (1.92 m)
- Position: Centre-back

Team information
- Current team: Middlesbrough
- Number: 4

Youth career
- –2017: Curzon Ashton
- 2017–2022: Blackburn Rovers

Senior career*
Years	Team	Apps	(Gls)
2022–2023	Blackburn Rovers	8	(0)
2023–2026	Tottenham Hotspur	0	(0)
2024	→ Plymouth Argyle (loan)	18	(0)
2024–2025	→ Stoke City (loan)	35	(0)
2025–2026	→ Stoke City (loan)	40	(0)
2026–	Middlesbrough	10	(1)

International career^{‡}
2021	Wales U16	1	(0)
2021–2022	England U17	7	(0)
2023	England U18	3	(0)
2022–2023	England U19	14	(1)
2024–2025	England U20	5	(0)
2025–	England U21	5	(0)
- * Club domestic league appearances and goals as of 17:33, 12 September 2026 (UTC) ‡ National team caps and goals as of 23:53, 31 March 2026 (UTC)

Ashley Phillips (né Famuyiwa; born 26 June 2005) is an English professional footballer who plays as a centre-back for EFL Championship club Middlesbrough.

== Club career ==
=== Blackburn Rovers ===
In September 2021, it was reported that Phillips had agreed to a three-year professional contract with Blackburn to come into effect from his seventeenth birthday the following June. However, by August 2022, Blackburn manager Jon Dahl Tomasson said the contract had not yet been signed. Phillips was named in the starting XI for his professional debut in the EFL Cup in a 4–0 victory at home at Ewood Park against Hartlepool United on 10 August 2022. Phillips made his league debut on 14 August 2022 in the game against West Bromwich Albion, playing 71 minutes in a 2–1 win. Phillips signed his first professional contract on 20 September 2022 committing his future to Blackburn Rovers until June 2025.

=== Tottenham Hotspur ===
On 5 August 2023, Phillips signed for Premier League club Tottenham Hotspur after they activated his £2m release clause. On 8 January 2024, Phillips joined Championship club Plymouth Argyle on loan for the remainder of the 2023–24 season. Phillips made sixteen appearances for the club, helping them to avoid relegation, and was named their Young Player of the Season.

==== Loan to Stoke City ====
On 23 August 2024, Phillips returned to the Championship, joining Stoke City on a season-long loan deal. Phillips scored his first goal in professional football on 29 October 2024 in a 3–2 EFL Cup defeat against Southampton. Phillips made 39 appearances for Stoke scoring one goal, as they finished in 18th position, avoiding relegation on the final day of the season. Phillips returned to Stoke on loan for the 2025–26 season. Phillips received his first senior red card in a 1–1 draw against his former side Blackburn Rovers, picking up two yellow cards for fouls on Yūki Ōhashi. Phillips was a regular starter under Mark Robins in 2025–26, making 44 appearances becoming a popular player amongst the supporters.

=== Middlesbrough ===
On 15 August 2026, Phillips signed a five-year contract with EFL Championship side Middlesbrough. He made his debut for the club, coming on as a 72nd minute substitute, in a 3–1 win against Doncaster Rovers in the second round of the EFL Cup. On 5 September 2026, Phillips made his first start for Middlesbrough and played 72 minutes before being substituted, in a 1-0 win against Queens Park Rangers. In the next match, Philips scored the winning goal in the last minute of the game, in a 4–3 win against Norwich City.

== International career ==
Phillips was born in England to a Nigerian father and Welsh mother. On 9 April 2021, he made his debut for the Wales U16s coming off the bench in a 3–2 win against England U16. On 1 October 2021, Phillips was called up to the England U17 squad. On 16 September 2022, Phillips along with Rovers teammate Adam Wharton were called up to the England U19 squad, making his debut in a 2–0 win against Montenegro U19. On 9 June 2023, Phillips made his England U18 debut during a 2–2 draw with Norway at the Lisbon International Tournament. On 6 September 2024, Phillips made his England U20 debut during a 1–1 draw away to Turkey. On 29 August 2025, Phillips was called up to the under-21s. He made his debut as a substitute during a 2027 UEFA European Under-21 Championship qualification win away to Kazakhstan on 8 September 2025.

== Style of play ==
Speaking in November 2021, then first team manager Tony Mowbray described Phillips as "phenomenal" and commented that as well as being 6 feet 4 inches tall Phillips had great ball-playing ability. Mowbray stated, "He's fast, mobile and can pass it really well. He can use both feet, he's composed...if you were to create a defender in the mould of how you would want one, this kid has got every attribute."

== Career statistics ==
As of match played 31 October 2026

Appearances and goals by club, season and competition
Club	Season	League			FA Cup		League Cup		Other		Total	
Club	Season	Division	Apps	Goals	Apps	Goals	Apps	Goals	Apps	Goals	Apps	Goals
Blackburn Rovers	2022–23	Championship	8	0	3	0	3	0	—		14	0
Tottenham Hotspur U21	2023–24	—	—		—		—		2 (Note: Appearances in EFL Trophy)	0	2	0
Tottenham Hotspur	2023–24	Premier League	0	0	0	0	0	0	0	0	0	0
Tottenham Hotspur	2024–25	Premier League	0	0	0	0	0	0	0	0	0	0
Tottenham Hotspur	2025–26	Premier League	0	0	0	0	0	0	0	0	0	0
Tottenham Hotspur	Total		0	0	0	0	0	0	0	0	0	0
Plymouth Argyle (loan)	2023–24	Championship	18	0	2	0	0	0	—		20	0
Stoke City (loan)	2024–25	Championship	35	0	1	0	3	1	—		39	1
Stoke City (loan)	2025–26	Championship	40	0	2	0	2	0	—		44	0
Stoke City (loan)	Total		75	0	3	0	5	1	—		83	1
Middlesbrough	2026–27	Championship	10	1	0	0	2	0	—		12	1
Career total			110	1	8	0	10	1	2	0	130	2

== Honours ==
- EFL Championship Apprentice of the Season: 2022–23
