= Adam Randell =

English footballer (born 2000)

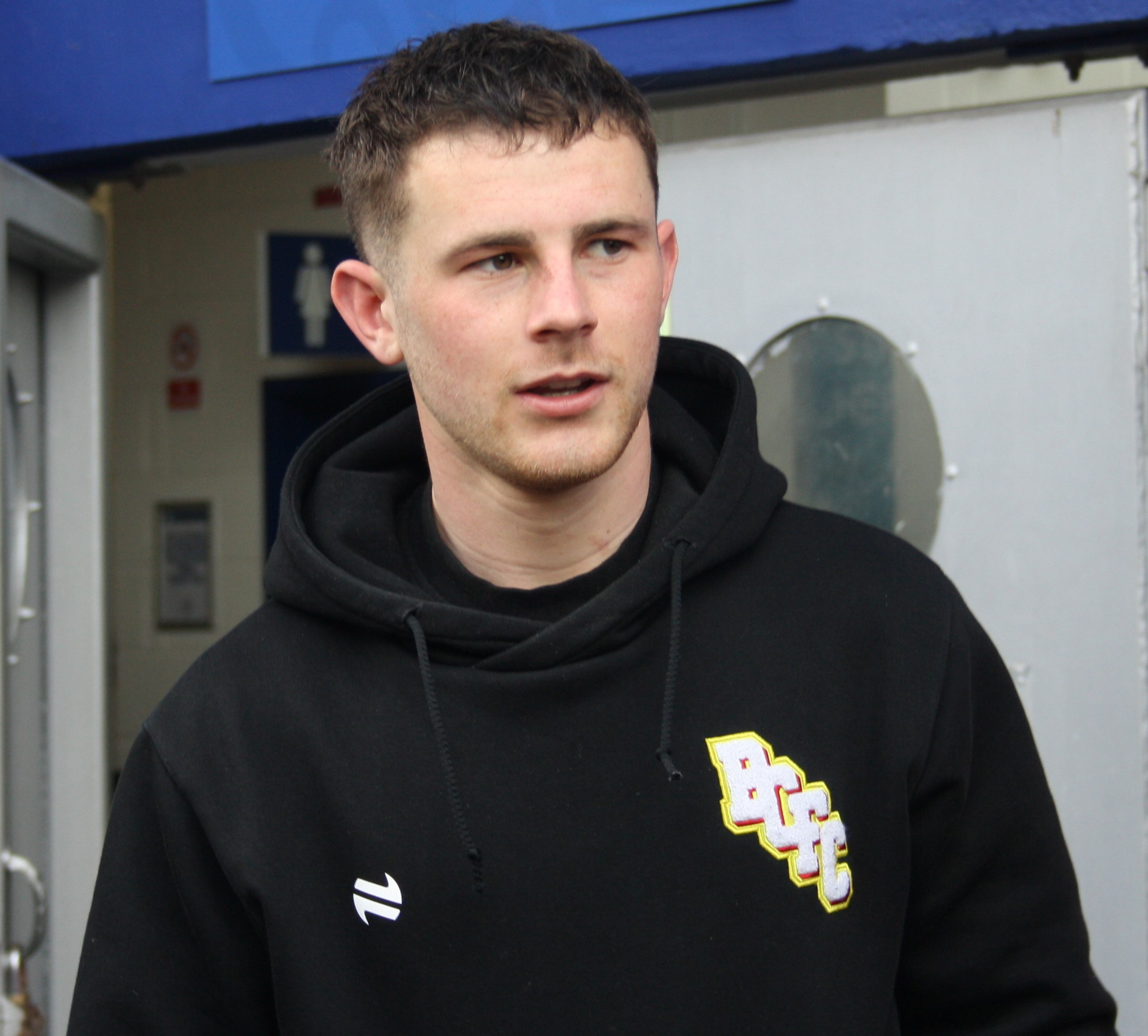
- Randell in 2026

Personal information
- Full name: Adam Fletcher Randell
- Date of birth: 1 October 2000 (age 26)
- Place of birth: Plymouth, England
- Height: 5 ft 9 in (1.74 m)
- Position: Midfielder

Team information
- Current team: Bristol City
- Number: 4

Youth career
- 2010–2018: Plymouth Argyle

Senior career*
Years	Team	Apps	(Gls)
2018–2025	Plymouth Argyle	145	(8)
2020–2021	→ Torquay United (loan)	42	(2)
2025–	Bristol City	48	(3)
- * Club domestic league appearances and goals as of 16 October 2026 (UTC)

Adam Fletcher Randell (born 1 October 2000) is an English professional footballer who plays as a midfielder for EFL Championship side Bristol City.

== Career ==
=== Plymouth Argyle ===
Randell signed his first professional contract on 1 November 2018 after progressing through the Plymouth Argyle Academy. He is known for his set-piece ability

Randell made his professional debut on 13 November 2018 in an EFL Trophy match between Argyle and EFL League Two side Newport County, where he started in midfield. Newport won the game 2–0.

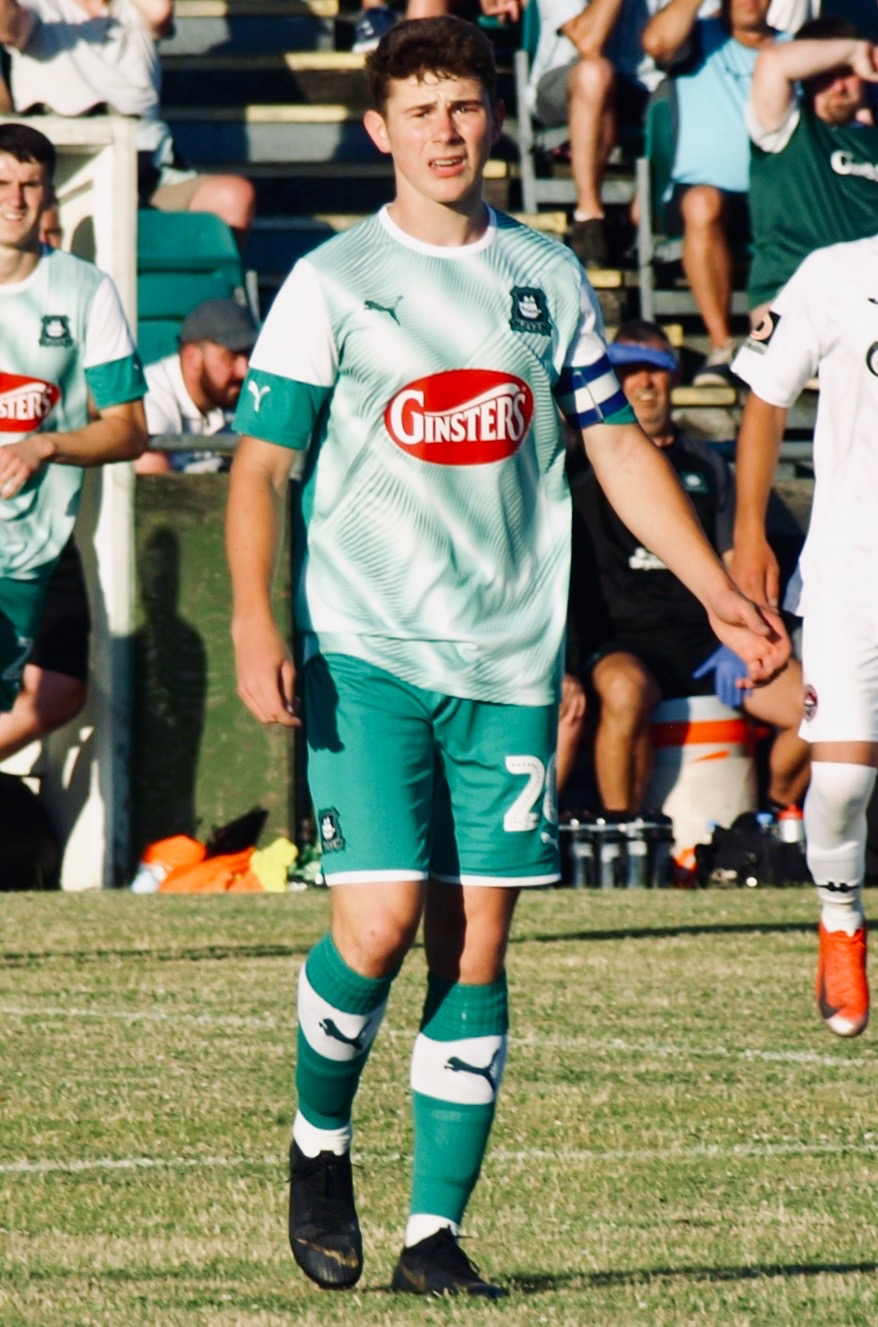
Randell in the Argyle away strip in the 19/20 pre-season at Truro

In the first friendly of the 2019–20 season, Randell was given the captain's armband by manager Ryan Lowe. With his performance in pre-season Randell was a regular on the bench in the 19/20 season and was the first back up for the defensive midfield position. Also being able to be deployed as a box to box.

Randell joined Torquay United in October 2020 and made his debut as an 80th-minute substitute against Stockport on 3 October in the National League at Plainmoor. He also appeared in the FA Trophy and FA Cup for Torquay. Randell has spent most of his playing time in his main role as a defensive midfielder however, he has been used as a right back as cover for injuries when needed showing his versatility on the field.

Randell won Torquay United's Young Player of the Season award for the 2020–21 season.

Due to Randell's impressive performances on loan at Torquay, Lowe and Plymouth Argyle offered Randell a new contract keeping him at Home Park until the end of the 2021–22 season.

Randell made his first league start for Plymouth Argyle on 30 October 2021 in a 2–1 win against Ipswch Town.

Randell won EFL League One with his boyhood club in 2022–23 playing 33 times. Scoring 4 goals, with the most important of them on the final day at Vale Park. He was also a vital part in helping the Greens avoid relegation from the EFL Championship in 2023–24 playing 45 times. He was latterly Vice Captain at Plymouth Argyle.

On 8 March 2025, Randell was handed a three match ban due to misconduct towards a match official at their match against Cardiff City.

=== Bristol City ===
On 1 July 2025, Randell joined Bristol City on a four year deal, for an undisclosed fee. On 9 August, he made his debut for the club in a 4–1 win against Sheffield United in the league. On 29 December, he scored his first goal for the club in a 2–1 defeat to Millwall.

== Career statistics ==
As of 15 August 2026

Appearances and goals by club, season and competition
Club	Season	League			FA Cup		League Cup		Other		Total	
Club	Season	Division	Apps	Goals	Apps	Goals	Apps	Goals	Apps	Goals	Apps	Goals
Plymouth Argyle	2018–19	League One	0	0	0	0	0	0	1 (Note: Appearance(s) in EFL Trophy)	0	1	0
Plymouth Argyle	2019–20	League Two	4	0	0	0	1	0	3	0	8	0
Plymouth Argyle	2020–21	League One	0	0	0	0	0	0	1	0	1	0
Plymouth Argyle	2021–22	League One	24	1	3	0	2	0	2	0	31	1
Plymouth Argyle	2022–23	League One	33	3	1	1	1	0	5	0	40	4
Plymouth Argyle	2023–24	Championship	45	3	3	1	1	0	—		49	4
Plymouth Argyle	2024–25	Championship	39	1	2	0	2	0	—		43	1
Plymouth Argyle	Total		145	8	9	2	7	0	12	0	173	10
Torquay United (loan)	2020–21	National League	42	2	2	0	—		4 (Note: Appearance in FA Trophy)	1	48	3
Bristol City	2025–26	Championship	44	3	1	0	2	0	—		47	3
Bristol City	2026–27	Championship	1	0	0	0	1	0	0	0	2	0
Bristol City	Total		45	3	1	0	3	0	0	0	49	3
Career total			232	13	12	2	10	0	16	1	270	16

== Honours ==
Plymouth Argyle

- EFL League One: 2022–23
- EFL Trophy runner-up: 2022–23
