= Caleb Roberts =

English footballer (born 2005)

Personal information
- Full name: Caleb James Roberts
- Date of birth: 24 October 2005 (age 21)
- Height: 1.78 m (5 ft 10 in)
- Position: Midfielder

Team information
- Current team: Plymouth Argyle
- Number: 24

Youth career
- –2022: Plymouth Argyle

Senior career*
Years	Team	Apps	(Gls)
2021–	Plymouth Argyle	14	(0)
2026	→ Truro City (loan)	6	(0)
2026 - 2027	→ Torquay United (loan)	4	(0)
- * Club domestic league appearances and goals as of 22:03, 5 April 2026 (UTC)

Caleb James Roberts (born 24 October 2005) is an English professional footballer who plays as a midfielder for EFL League One club Plymouth Argyle.

== Club career ==
On 2 November 2021, Roberts made his first-team debut aged 16 years and nine days, in an EFL Trophy match between Plymouth Argyle and Arsenal U21s.

He made his full debut on 18 October 2022, in Argyle's 1–0 EFL Trophy win against Crystal Palace U21s. He signed his first pro-contract on his 17th birthday, and a month later played his first FA Cup game, when he featured as a substitute in Argyle's first round 5–1 loss to Grimsby Town.

On 22 November 2022, Roberts scored his first professional goal, the eventual winner in a 3–2 EFL Trophy match against Charlton Athletic.

On 13 February 2026, he joined National League club Truro City on loan for the remainder of the season.

== Career statistics ==
As of match played 6 October 2026

Appearances and goals by club, season and competition
Club	Season	League			FA Cup		EFL Cup		Other		Total	
Club	Season	Division	Apps	Goals	Apps	Goals	Apps	Goals	Apps	Goals	Apps	Goals
Plymouth Argyle	2021–22	League One	0	0	0	0	0	0	1 (Note: Appearance(s) in EFL Trophy)	0	1	0
Plymouth Argyle	2022–23	League One	1	0	1	0	0	0	3	1	5	1
Plymouth Argyle	2023–24	Championship	0	0	2	0	1	0	0	0	3	0
Plymouth Argyle	2024–25	Championship	5	0	1	0	0	0	0	0	6	0
Plymouth Argyle	2025–26	League One	8	0	2	0	1	0	3	0	14	0
Plymouth Argyle	2026–27	League One	0	0	0	0	1	0	2	0	3	0
Plymouth Argyle	Total		14	0	6	0	3	0	9	1	32	1
Truro City (loan)	2025–26	National League	6	0	—		—		1 (Note: Appearance in National League Cup)	0	7	0
Career total			20	0	6	0	3	0	10	1	39	1
