= Freddie Issaka =

Welsh footballer (born 2006)

Personal information
- Full name: Frederick Habib Yampabu Issaka
- Date of birth: 28 July 2006 (age 20)
- Place of birth: Truro, England
- Height: 5 ft 10 in (1.77 m)
- Position: Forward

Team information
- Current team: Plymouth Argyle
- Number: 25

Youth career
- –2021: Truro City
- 2021–2022: Plymouth Argyle

Senior career*
Years	Team	Apps	(Gls)
2022–	Plymouth Argyle	27	(1)
2025–2026	→ Bristol Rovers (loan)	7	(0)
2026	→ Truro City (loan)	14	(2)
2026-2027	→ Gateshead (loan)	7	(1)

International career^{‡}
2021	England U16	2	(0)
2022–2023	Wales U17	10	(1)
2023–	Wales U19	14	(1)
2025–	Wales U21	2	(0)
- * Club domestic league appearances and goals as of 20:20, 24 May 2026 (UTC) ‡ National team caps and goals as of 21:13, 14 October 2025 (UTC)

Frederick Habib Yampabu Issaka (born 28 July 2006) is a professional footballer who plays as a forward for EFL League One club Plymouth Argyle. He is a Wales under-21 international.

== Club career ==
Issaka became Plymouth Argyle's youngest ever player when he made his professional debut on 31 August 2021, aged 15 years and 34 days, when he featured off the bench in a 2–0 EFL Cup defeat to Newport County.

In July 2023 Issaka signed his first professional contract with Plymouth. In July 2024 he signed a new four-year contract with the club.

He scored his first goal for The Greens in a 3–3 home game on 26 October 2024 versus Preston in which Plymouth came back from 3–0 down.

On 1 September 2025, he Issaka joined EFL League Two club Bristol Rovers for the remainder of the 2025–26 season. On 6 January 2026 he was recalled from his loan by Plymouth Argyle.

On 13 February 2026, Issaka joined hometown club Truro City of the National League on loan for the remainder of the season.

== International career ==
Issaka was born in England to a Ghanaian father and Welsh mother. In September 2021, he was called up by a Wales U16 training camp. The next month he was selected in the squad for their Victory Shield campaign.

In December 2021, Issaka featured twice for England U16s, in a pair of friendlies at St George's Park vs Turkey U16s.

In 2022 Issaka was again selected to represent Wales. In April he featured in an under-16 UEFA Development Tournament, and in October playing for the under-17s in three UEFA Euro U17 Championship qualifiers, scoring in a 3–3 draw with Sweden. In October 2023 Issaka was selected for the Wales Under 19 squad.

== Career statistics ==
As of match played 13 September 2025

Club	Season	Division	League		FA Cup		EFL Cup		Other		Total	
Club	Season	Division	Apps	Goals	Apps	Goals	Apps	Goals	Apps	Goals	Apps	Goals
Plymouth Argyle	2021-22	League One	0	0	0	0	0	0	1 (Note: Appearance(s) in EFL Trophy)	0	1	0
Plymouth Argyle	2022-23	League One	1	0	0	0	0	0	5	0	6	0
Plymouth Argyle	2023-24	Championship	5	0	2	0	1	0	—		8	0
Plymouth Argyle	2024-25	Championship	19	1	0	0	1	0	—		20	1
Plymouth Argyle	2025-26	League One	2	0	0	0	1	0	0	0	3	0
Plymouth Argyle	Total		27	1	2	0	3	0	6	0	38	1
Bristol Rovers (loan)	2025-26	League Two	7	0	1	0	0	0	1	0	9	0
Career total			34	1	3	0	3	0	7	0	47	1
