= Mickel Miller =

English footballer (born 1995)

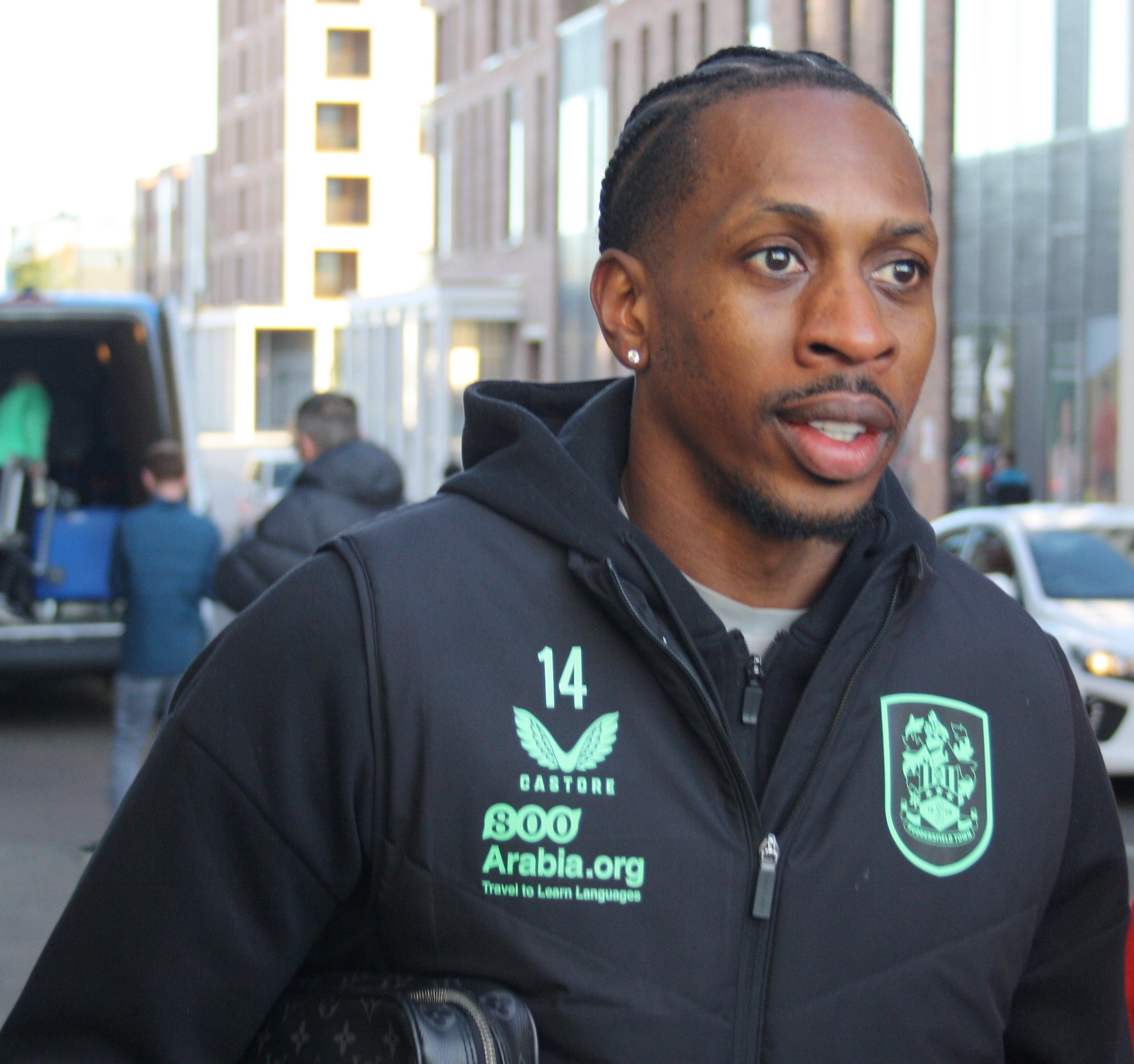
- Miller in 2026

Personal information
- Full name: Mickel Carlos Miller
- Date of birth: 2 December 1995 (age 30)
- Place of birth: Croydon, England
- Height: 1.73 m (5 ft 8 in)
- Positions: Wing-back; winger

Team information
- Current team: Bromley
- Number: 19

Youth career
- –2013: Carshalton Athletic

Senior career*
Years	Team	Apps	(Gls)
2013–2018	Carshalton Athletic	146	(49)
2018–2020	Hamilton Academical	58	(8)
2020–2022	Rotherham United	32	(3)
2021	→ Northampton Town (loan)	12	(0)
2022–2024	Plymouth Argyle	43	(1)
2024–2026	Huddersfield Town	31	(0)
2026–	Bromley	2	(1)
- * Club domestic league appearances and goals as of 19:14, 19 September 2026 (UTC)

Mickel Carlos Miller (born 2 December 1995) is an English professional footballer who plays as a wing-back for EFL League One club Bromley.

== Club career ==
=== Carshalton Athletic ===
Miller progressed through the youth ranks at Isthmian League Premier Division club Carshalton Athletic and broke into the senior team for the 2013–14 season. On 15 April 2014, he made his debut in a 1–0 win at Leiston. In December 2014, he was rewarded for his form and signed a part-time contract with the club.

Miller appeared in every league match during the 2016–17 season. On 25 March 2017, he scored his first hat-trick in a 4–1 win against Herne Bay.

His appearances attracted the attention of several Football League clubs, and in May 2017, he became a part of Jamie Vardy's V9 Academy. In July 2017, Miller trialled with Sheffield Wednesday.

After being an unused substitute on 26 August 2017, his run of 49 consecutive league appearances came to an end. However, he marked his return to action with a brace against Corinthian-Casuals, an FA Cup hat-trick against Pagham and the opening goal in 2–1 win against Faversham Town.

On 20 November 2017, he scored his second hat-trick in a 6–2 win against Egham Town in the Surrey Senior Cup. He also netted all three goals in a 3–0 win against Sittingbourne on 6 January 2018.

=== Hamilton Academical ===
On 20 January 2018, Carshalton Athletic announced that Miller had agreed terms with Scottish Premiership side Hamilton Academical. Nine days later, Hamilton confirmed the signing for an undisclosed fee. After being named as an unused substitute on three occasions, Miller made his professional debut in a 2–0 win against Motherwell on 10 March 2018.

Miller had a successful 2018–19 season with Hamilton Academical where he finished as the club's top goalscorer.

In February 2019 Hamilton Academical activated their option to extend his contract to keep him until summer 2020.

=== Rotherham United ===
Miller joined Rotherham United on 5 July 2020 on a two-year deal. On 22 August 2020, Mickel made his first start for Rotherham in a pre-season fixture scoring a header in a 3–0 win v Mansfield.

Miller joined Northampton Town on loan until the end of the 2020–21 season on 14 January 2021.

Miller was released at the end of the 2021–22 season.

=== Plymouth Argyle ===
On 27 June 2022, Miller joined EFL League One side Plymouth Argyle on a two-year contract.

Injuries hampered his 2022–23 season, only making 12 appearances in Argyle's league title-winning campaign. He had to wait until 19 November to make his debut, as a substitute in Argyle's 2–2 draw away to Burton Albion. On 2 March 2023, he featured in the EFL Trophy Final for a consecutive season, this time coming out on the losing side as Argyle lost 4–0 to Bolton Wanderers.

The 2023–24 season in the EFL Championship saw Miller feature more regularly, making more appearances by Christmas than he'd made in the entirety of the previous season. His versatility saw him deployed as both a wing-back in a 3–4–3, and as an out-and-out left-back in a 4–3–3. He was offered a new contract at the end of the season.

On 1 July 2024, Plymouth Argyle announced that Miller's contract had expired and that he would be departing the club.

=== Huddersfield Town ===
On 1 July 2024, Miller signed for recently relegated League One side Huddersfield Town on a two-year contract.

On 8 May 2026, the club said the player would leave in the summer once his contract had expired.

=== Bromley ===
On 28 August 2026, Miller signed for League One club Bromley on a free transfer.

== Personal life ==
Miller attended Stanley Park High School. He is the cousin of Cheltenham Town winger Ethon Archer. He is an ambassador for Unique Talent.

== Career statistics ==
As of 12 April 2024

Appearances and goals by club, season and competition
Club	Season	League			National Cup		League Cup		Other		Total	
Club	Season	Division	Apps	Goals	Apps	Goals	Apps	Goals	Apps	Goals	Apps	Goals
Carshalton Athletic	2013–14	Isthmian League Premier Division	1	0	0	0	0	0	0	0	1	0
Carshalton Athletic	2014–15	Isthmian League Division One South	38	7	2	1	0	0	1 (Note: One appearance in the Surrey Senior Cup.)	0	41	8
Carshalton Athletic	2015–16	Isthmian League Division One South	34	8	3	0	0	0	1 (Note: Appearance in the FA Trophy.)	0	38	8
Carshalton Athletic	2016–17	Isthmian League Division One South	46	16	3	4	0	0	1	0	50	20
Carshalton Athletic	2017–18	Isthmian League South Division	27	18	3	3	0	0	3 (Note: One appearance in the FA Trophy. Two appearances and four goals in the Surrey Senior Cup.)	4	33	25
Carshalton Athletic	Total		146	49	11	8	0	0	6	4	163	61
Hamilton Academical	2017–18	Scottish Premiership	6	0	0	0	0	0	0	0	6	0
Hamilton Academical	2018–19	Scottish Premiership	31	5	1	0	4	3	0	0	36	8
Hamilton Academical	2019–20	Scottish Premiership	21	3	2	1	3	0	0	0	26	4
Hamilton Academical	Total		58	8	3	1	7	3	0	0	68	12
Rotherham United	2020–21	Championship	9	0	0	0	0	0	0	0	9	0
Rotherham United	2021–22	League One	23	3	1	0	0	0	6 (Note: Appearances and goals in the EFL Trophy.)	1	30	4
Rotherham United	Total		32	3	1	0	0	0	6	1	39	4
Northampton Town (loan)	2020–21	League One	12	0	0	0	0	0	0	0	12	0
Plymouth Argyle	2022–23	League One	9	0	0	0	0	0	3	0	12	0
Plymouth Argyle	2023–24	Championship	34	1	2	0	1	0	0	0	37	1
Plymouth Argyle	Total		43	1	2	0	1	0	3	0	49	1
Huddersfield Town	2024–25	League One	18	0	1	0	0	0	1	0	20	0
Huddersfield Town	2025–26	League One	13	0	1	0	0	0	3	0	17	0
Huddersfield Town	Total		31	0	2	0	0	0	4	0	37	0
Career total			314	61	19	9	8	3	19	5	368	78

== Honours ==
Rotherham United

- League One runner-up: 2021–22
- EFL Trophy: 2021–22

Plymouth Argyle

- EFL League One: 2022–23
- EFL Trophy runner-up: 2022–23
