= Dan Scarr =

English footballer (born 1994)

Personal information
- Full name: Daniel George Scarr
- Date of birth: 24 December 1994 (age 31)
- Place of birth: Bromsgrove, England
- Height: 6 ft 2 in (1.88 m)
- Position: Centre back

Team information
- Current team: Salford City

Youth career
- 2011–2013: Worcester City

Senior career*
Years	Team	Apps	(Gls)
2013–2014	Causeway United		
2014–2015	Redditch United		
2015–2017	Stourbridge	60	(6)
2017–2019	Birmingham City	0	(0)
2017–2018	→ Wycombe Wanderers (loan)	22	(1)
2019–2021	Walsall	85	(5)
2021–2024	Plymouth Argyle	95	(5)
2024–2026	Wrexham	34	(0)
2026–	Salford City	6	(0)
- * Club domestic league appearances and goals as of 18 October 2026 (UTC)

Daniel George Scarr (born 24 December 1994) is an English professional footballer who plays as a centre back for EFL League Two club Salford City.

He played for several years in non-league football, including as a member of the Stourbridge team that reached the third round of the 2016–17 FA Cup, before signing for Birmingham City in January 2017. He spent the 2017–18 season on loan to Wycombe Wanderers, and made one EFL Cup appearance for Birmingham before joining Walsall in January 2019. He left the club when his contract expired in June 2021 and signed for League One Plymouth Argyle, whom he helped gain promotion to the Championship and then retain their second-tier status, before signing for Wrexham in 2024.

== Life and career ==
=== Early life and career ===
Scarr's father, Ian, played non-league football as a goalkeeper before becoming a referee. Scarr himself began his football career at Worcester College of Technology Football Academy in association with Worcester City. He was club captain of the academy's team, and it was at that stage that he was converted from right back to centre back.

After completing his college course, Scarr played for Midland Alliance (ninth-tier) club Causeway United before moving up two steps of the football pyramid to join Redditch United of the Southern League Premier Division in 2014.

A year later, he signed for Northern Premier League Premier Division (seventh-tier) club Stourbridge, for which he played part-time while working as a fitness trainer in a gym in the Rubery area of Birmingham. In 2015–16 he made 55 appearances in all competitions, performed well, and signed for another season. He was a member of the Stourbridge team that progressed through four rounds of qualifying and two rounds proper to reach the third round of the 2016–17 FA Cup. Drawn away to Wycombe Wanderers of EFL League Two, Stourbridge conceded just after half-time, but with 20 minutes left, a long free kick into the penalty area fell to Scarr who stabbed it home to equalise; Adebayo Akinfenwa restored Wycombe's lead late on. Scarr's performances earned him a place in the Northern Premier League Premier Division Team of the Season.

=== Birmingham City ===
He promptly went on trial with West Bromwich Albion, and was watched by other clubs including Middlesbrough, Port Vale and Portsmouth, but it was Birmingham City – the club he supports – who signed him on a two-and-a-half-year contract for an undisclosed fee. Soon after joining the club, he tore a hip flexor and was out of action for the rest of the season.

Scarr joined Wycombe Wanderers on 31 August 2017, on loan until 1 January 2018. After two matches as an unused substitute, Scarr made his Football League debut on 12 September, in the starting eleven for the League Two fixture away to Mansfield Town; he played the whole match, which ended goalless. In a 3–3 draw with Carlisle United in October, Scarr conceded a penalty for what the referee saw as a foul on Shaun Miller; Miller was subsequently charged by the Football Association and became the first player retrospectively suspended for "successful deception of a match official" via a "clear act of simulation". In mid-December, by which time he had made ten league appearances, his loan was extended to the end of the season. Scarr scored his first Football League goal on 22 December with a volley from outside the penalty area to help Wycombe recover from a two-goal deficit away to Coventry City, only to lose 3–2. He established himself in Wycombe's starting eleven in the second half of the campaign, but an injury sustained playing against Cambridge United in March put an end to his season. The team went on to achieve automatic promotion.

He made his debut for Birmingham City in the starting eleven for the visit to Reading in the EFL Cup first round on 14 August 2018; Birmingham lost 2–0.

=== Walsall ===
Scarr joined League One club Walsall on 21 January 2019, signing a two-and-a-half-year deal for an undisclosed fee.

=== Plymouth Argyle ===
At the end of the 2020–21 season, Scarr turned down Walsall's offer of new terms in favour of joining Plymouth Argyle of League One when his Walsall contract expired. He made his debut on the opening day of the season, playing the whole of a 2–0 defeat away to Rotherham United. After Plymouth won League One in the 2022–23 season, Dan Scarr gained attention on social media for catching a flare thrown towards him during an open top bus parade through the city.

Following Plymouth's promotion to the EFL Championship, Scarr signed a new two-year contract.

=== Wrexham ===
Scarr joined League One club Wrexham on 2 August 2024 on a three-year contract; the fee was undisclosed.

=== Salford City ===
In September 2026 Scarr joined League Two club Salford City for an undisclosed fee.

== Career statistics ==
As of match played 2 May 2026

Appearances and goals by club, season and competition
Club	Season	League			FA Cup		League Cup		Other		Total	
Club	Season	Division	Apps	Goals	Apps	Goals	Apps	Goals	Apps	Goals	Apps	Goals
Stourbridge	2015–16	NPL Premier Division	44	6	6	0	—		5 (Note: Four appearances and one goal in FA Trophy, one appearance in Worcestershire Senior Cup)	1	55	7
Stourbridge	2016–17	NPL Premier Division	16	0	8	3	—		1 (Note: Appearance in FA Trophy)	0	25	3
Stourbridge	Total		60	6	14	3	—		6	1	80	10
Birmingham City	2016–17	Championship	0	0	0	0	0	0	—		0	0
Birmingham City	2017–18	Championship	0	0	0	0	0	0	—		0	0
Birmingham City	2018–19	Championship	0	0	0	0	1	0	—		1	0
Birmingham City	Total		0	0	0	0	1	0	—		1	0
Wycombe Wanderers (loan)	2017–18	League Two	22	1	3	0	—		1 (Note: Appearances in EFL Trophy)	0	26	1
Walsall	2018–19	League One	17	1	—		—		—		17	1
Walsall	2019–20	League Two	33	0	3	0	0	0	4	2	40	2
Walsall	2020–21	League Two	35	4	1	0	1	0	2	0	39	4
Walsall	Total		85	5	4	0	1	0	6	2	96	7
Plymouth Argyle	2021–22	League One	35	2	5	0	2	0	0	0	42	2
Plymouth Argyle	2022–23	League One	32	2	1	0	0	0	3	0	36	2
Plymouth Argyle	2023–24	Championship	28	1	2	0	1	0	—		31	1
Plymouth Argyle	Total		95	5	8	0	3	0	3	0	109	5
Wrexham	2024–25	League One	14	0	0	0	1	0	5	0	20	0
Wrexham	2025–26	Championship	20	0	1	0	3	0	0	0	24	0
Wrexham	2026–27	Championship	0	0	0	0	—		0	0	0	0
Wrexham	Total		34	0	1	0	4	0	5	0	44	0
Career total			296	17	30	3	9	0	21	3	356	23

== Honours ==
Plymouth Argyle

- EFL League One: 2022–23
- EFL Trophy runner-up: 2022–23

Wrexham

- EFL League One second-place promotion: 2024–25

Individual

- Northern Premier League Premier Division Team of the Year: 2016–17
