= Jack Endacott =

English footballer (born 2004)

Personal information
- Full name: Jack Joseph David Endacott
- Date of birth: 11 October 2004 (age 22)
- Position: Left-back

Team information
- Current team: Plymouth Parkway; Loyola Greyhounds; Flint City Bucks

Youth career
- –2022: Plymouth Argyle

College career
| Years | Team | Apps | (Gls) |
| 2025– | Loyola Greyhounds | 15 | (2) |

Senior career*
| Years | Team | Apps | (Gls) |
| 2022–2024 | Plymouth Argyle | 1 | (0) |
| 2023 | → Tiverton Town (loan) | 7 | (0) |
| 2023–2024 | → Tavistock (loan) | 27 | (1) |
| 2024 | Tavistock | 5 | (0) |
| 2024–2025 | Plymouth Parkway | 15 | (0) |
| 2025– | Plymouth Parkway | 3 | (0) |
- * Club domestic league appearances and goals as of 13:31, 1 January 2025 (UTC)

Jack Joseph David Endacott (born 11 October 2004) is a professional footballer who plays as a defender for Plymouth Parkway, Flint City Bucks FC and Loyola Greyhounds.

== Club career ==
He joined Plymouth Argyle's academy aged 10 from local club SB Frankfort. He made his professional debut on 10 August 2022, when he started in a 2–0 EFL Cup defeat to Peterborough United.

He made his league debut on 1 January 2023, appearing as a substitute in Argyle's 3–1 EFL League One win against Milton Keynes Dons that day. At the end of the 2022–23 season, he was one of four second-year apprentices to become a professional player.

On 2 August 2023, Endacott joined Southern League Premier Division South club Tiverton Town on a three-month loan deal. On 7 October, he was recalled from his loan spell and subsequently joined Tavistock.

On 10 May 2024, Plymouth announced he would be released in the summer once his contract expired.

In August 2024, Endacott signed for Southern League Division One South club Tavistock.

In October 2024, he signed for Southern League Premier Division South club Plymouth Parkway.

In June 2025, Endacott joined Patriot League university side Loyola Greyhounds. In December 2025, he returned to Plymouth Parkway for a short spell. On his return to college he was awarded two accolades, Male Freshman Of The Year and MVP.

In May 2026 Endacott joined successful GREAT LAKES USL 2 side Flint City Bucks, playing during their summer season.

== Career statistics ==
Appearances and goals by club, season and competition
| Club | Season | League | | | FA Cup | | EFL Cup | | Other | | Total | |
| Club | Season | Division | Apps | Goals | Apps | Goals | Apps | Goals | Apps | Goals | Apps | Goals |
|---|---|---|---|---|---|---|---|---|---|---|---|---|
Plymouth Argyle
| Plymouth Argyle | 2022–23 | EFL League One | 1 | 0 | 0 | 0 | 0 | 0 | 0 (Note: Appearance(s) in EFL Trophy) | 0 | 0 | 0 |
| Tiverton Town (loan) | 2023–24 | Southern League Premier | 0 | 0 | 0 | 0 | 0 | 0 | 0 | 0 | 0 | 0 |
| Tavistock (loan) | 2023–24 | Southern League Div 1 | 0 | 0 | 0 | 0 | 0 | 0 | 0 | 0 | 0 | 0 |
| Career total | | | 1 | 0 | 0 | 0 | 0 | 0 | 0 | 0 | 0 | 0 |
