= 2014 UEFA European Under-17 Championship squads =

The following is a list of squads for each national team competing at the 2014 UEFA European Under-17 Championship in Malta. The tournament started on 9 May and the final took place in Ta'Qali in the National Stadium on 21 May 2014. Each national team had to submit a squad of 18 players born after 1 January 1997. Although some associations have published a list of players, the regulations state that the teams only need be submitted to UEFA before 12:00 CET on 8 May. The number of caps and goals listed below are from before the tournament started.

Players in boldface have been capped at full international level at some point in their career.

== Group A ==
=== England ===
Head coach: (England) John Peacock

No.	Pos.	Player	Date of birth (age)	Caps	Goals	Club
1	GK	Freddie Woodman	4 March 1997 (aged 17)	6	0	(The Football Association) Newcastle United
2	DF	Jonjoe Kenny	15 March 1997 (aged 17)	3	0	(The Football Association) Everton
3	DF	Tafari Moore	5 July 1997 (aged 16)	3	0	(The Football Association) Arsenal
4	MF	Ryan Ledson	19 August 1997 (aged 16)	6	1	(The Football Association) Everton
5	DF	**Joe Gomez**	23 May 1997 (aged 16)	8	0	(The Football Association) Charlton Athletic
6	DF	Dael Fry	30 August 1997 (aged 16)	1	0	(The Football Association) Middlesbrough
7	MF	Demetri Mitchell	11 January 1997 (aged 17)	3	0	(The Football Association) Manchester United
8	MF	Josh Onomah	27 April 1997 (aged 17)	4	0	(The Football Association) Tottenham Hotspur
9	FW	Adam Armstrong	10 February 1997 (aged 17)	6	7	(The Football Association) Newcastle United
10	FW	**Dominic Solanke**	14 September 1997 (aged 16)	6	5	(The Football Association) Chelsea
11	FW	Izzy Brown	7 January 1997 (aged 17)	6	4	(The Football Association) Chelsea
12	DF	Mandela Egbo	17 August 1997 (aged 16)	2	0	(The Football Association) Crystal Palace
13	GK	Sam Howes	10 November 1997 (aged 16)	0	0	(The Football Association) West Ham United
14	MF	**Lewis Cook**	3 February 1997 (aged 17)	2	0	(The Football Association) Leeds United
15	DF	Taylor Moore	12 May 1997 (aged 16)	2	0	(French Football Federation) RC Lens
16	MF	Callum Cooke	21 February 1997 (aged 17)	5	0	(The Football Association) Middlesbrough
17	MF	Joshua Sims	28 March 1997 (aged 17)	3	0	(The Football Association) Southampton
18	FW	Patrick Roberts	5 February 1997 (aged 17)	3	3	(The Football Association) Fulham

=== Malta ===
Head coach: (Argentina) Sergio Soldano

No.	Pos.	Player	Date of birth (age)	Caps	Goals	Club
1	GK	Jamie Azzopardi	1 September 1997 (aged 16)			(Malta Football Association) Mosta F.C.
2	DF	Daniel Buckle	29 July 1997 (aged 16)			(Malta Football Association) Hibernians F.C.
3	DF	Jean Borg	8 January 1998 (aged 16)			(Malta Football Association) Valletta F.C.
4	DF	Nick Ghio	18 June 1998 (aged 15)			(Malta Football Association) Hibernians F.C.
5	MF	**Matthew Guillaumier**	9 April 1998 (aged 16)			(Malta Football Association) St. Andrews F.C.
7	FW	Aidan Jake Friggieri	28 April 1998 (aged 16)			(Malta Football Association) Sliema Wanderers F.C.
8	MF	Jake Grech	18 November 1997 (aged 16)			(Malta Football Association) Hamrun Spartans F.C.
9	FW	**Kyrian Nwoko**	4 July 1997 (aged 16)			(Malta Football Association) St. Andrews F.C.
10	MF	Connor Borg	13 May 1997 (aged 16)			(Italian Football Federation) A.C. Chievo Verona
11	FW	**Joseph Mbong**	15 July 1997 (aged 16)			(Malta Football Association) Hibernians F.C.
12	GK	Mikhail Sciberras	17 May 1997 (aged 16)			(Malta Football Association) Balzan F.C.
13	MF	**Myles Beerman**	13 March 1999 (aged 15)	46	1	(Malta Football Association) Floriana F.C.
14	DF	Iousef Meli	7 November 1997 (aged 16)			(Malta Football Association) Sliema Wanderers F.C.
15	MF	Mark Anthony Scicluna	24 February 1997 (aged 17)			(Malta Football Association) Sliema Wanderers F.C.
16	DF	Neil Spiteri	3 June 1997 (aged 16)			(Malta Football Association) Floriana F.C.
17	MF	**Juan Corbolan**	3 January 1997 (aged 17)			(Malta Football Association) Balzan F.C.
18	MF	**Neil Tabone**	1 October 1997 (aged 16)			(Malta Football Association) Floriana F.C.
19	DF	Luke Galea	21 January 1997 (aged 17)			(Malta Football Association) Hamrun Spartans F.C.

=== Netherlands ===
Head coach: (Netherlands) Maarten Jan-Willem Stekelenburg

No.	Pos.	Player	Date of birth (age)	Caps	Goals	Club
1	GK	Yanick van Osch	24 March 1997 (aged 17)	5	0	(Royal Dutch Football Association) PSV Eindhoven
2	DF	Hidde ter Avest	20 May 1997 (aged 16)	4	0	(Royal Dutch Football Association) FC Twente
3	DF	Keziah Veendorp	17 February 1997 (aged 17)	6	0	(Royal Dutch Football Association) FC Groningen
4	DF	**Calvin Verdonk**	26 April 1997 (aged 17)	6	0	(Royal Dutch Football Association) Feyenoord
5	DF	Wellington Verloo	27 February 1997 (aged 17)	6	0	(Royal Dutch Football Association) Vitesse Arnhem
6	MF	**Donny van de Beek**	18 April 1997 (aged 17)	6	1	(Royal Dutch Football Association) AFC Ajax
7	FW	**Steven Bergwijn**	8 October 1997 (aged 16)	5	4	(Royal Dutch Football Association) PSV Eindhoven
8	MF	Jari Schuurman	22 February 1997 (aged 17)	5	0	(Royal Dutch Football Association) Feyenoord
9	FW	Dani van der Moot	7 March 1997 (aged 17)	6	3	(Royal Dutch Football Association) PSV Eindhoven
10	MF	**Kenneth Paal**	24 June 1997 (aged 16)	8	0	(Royal Dutch Football Association) PSV Eindhoven
11	FW	Anthony Berenstein	2 March 1997 (aged 17)			(Royal Dutch Football Association) FC Utrecht
12	DF	Rick van der Meer	14 June 1997 (aged 16)	2	0	(Royal Dutch Football Association) Feyenoord
13	FW	Segun Owobowale	22 March 1997 (aged 17)	5	2	(Royal Dutch Football Association) ADO Den Haag
14	MF	Abdelhak Nouri	2 April 1997 (aged 17)	5	2	(Royal Dutch Football Association) AFC Ajax
15	DF	Mauro Savastano	16 April 1997 (aged 17)	2	1	(Royal Dutch Football Association) AFC Ajax
16	GK	**Justin Bijlow**	10 January 1998 (aged 16)	1	0	(Royal Dutch Football Association) Feyenoord
17	MF	Marlon Slabbekoorn	1 February 1997 (aged 17)	9	4	(Royal Dutch Football Association) Feyenoord
18	MF	Bilal Ould-Chikh	28 July 1997 (aged 16)	3	0	(Royal Dutch Football Association) FC Twente
19	DF	Guido Janssen	9 January 1997 (aged 17)	5	2	(Royal Dutch Football Association) FC Utrecht

=== Turkey ===
Head coach: (Turkey) Hakan Tecimer

No.	Pos.	Player	Date of birth (age)	Caps	Goals	Club
1	GK	Tarık Çetin	8 January 1997 (aged 17)	14	0	(Turkish Football Federation) Fenerbahçe
3	DF	Bahadır Çiloğlu	5 January 1997 (aged 17)	14	0	(Turkish Football Federation) Fenerbahçe
4	DF	Burak Bekaroğlu	16 April 1997 (aged 17)	3	1	(Turkish Football Federation) Sakaryaspor
5	DF	**Ertuğrul Ersoy**	13 February 1997 (aged 17)	4	2	(Turkish Football Federation) Yeşil Bursa SK
6	MF	Hasan Özkan	14 November 1997 (aged 16)	11	0	(Royal Belgian Football Association) KV Mechelen
7	FW	Sabit Hakan Yılmaz	27 July 1997 (aged 16)	14	0	(Turkish Football Federation) Turgutluspor
8	MF	Birhan Vatansever	25 April 1997 (aged 17)	14	0	(Turkish Football Federation) Galatasaray
9	FW	**Enes Ünal**	10 May 1997 (aged 16)	10	7	(Turkish Football Federation) Bursaspor
10	MF	Emirhan Aydoğan	26 June 1997 (aged 16)	13	0	(Turkish Football Federation) Bursaspor
11	MF	Doğuş Can İncedere	15 January 1997 (aged 17)	6	1	(Turkish Football Federation) Galatasaray
12	GK	Übeyd Adıyaman	2 October 1997 (aged 16)	14	0	(Turkish Football Federation) Gençlerbirliği
13	MF	Alican Özfesli	1 January 1997 (aged 17)	3	1	(Turkish Football Federation) Altınordu FK
15	MF	Okan Çelik	1 January 1997 (aged 17)	8	0	(Turkish Football Federation) Gençlerbirliği
16	MF	Tuncay Kılıç	2 May 1997 (aged 17)	3	0	(Turkish Football Federation) Göztepe SK
17	FW	Hayrullah Alıcı	7 January 1997 (aged 17)	8	4	(German Football Association) Borussia Dortmund
18	FW	Fatih Aktay	29 August 1997 (aged 16)	3	0	(Turkish Football Federation) Altınordu FK
19	DF	**Zeki Çelik**	17 February 1997 (aged 17)			(Turkish Football Federation) Bursaspor
21	MF	**Uğur Tezel**	27 February 1997 (aged 17)		0	(German Football Association) Hertha BSC

== Group B ==
=== Portugal ===
Head coach: (Portugal) Emílio Peixe

No.	Pos.	Player	Date of birth (age)	Caps	Goals	Club
1	GK	Pedro Silva	13 February 1997 (aged 17)	11	0	(Portuguese Football Federation) Sporting
2	DF	Hugo Santos	8 June 1997 (aged 16)	8	0	(Portuguese Football Federation) Benfica
3	DF	**Rúben Dias**	14 May 1997 (aged 16)	8	14	(Portuguese Football Federation) Benfica
4	DF	Pedro Rodrigues	20 May 1997 (aged 16)	14	1	(Portuguese Football Federation) Benfica
5	DF	Yuri Ribeiro	24 January 1997 (aged 17)	11	1	(Portuguese Football Federation) Benfica
6	MF	**Rúben Neves**	13 March 1997 (aged 17)	27	2	(Portuguese Football Federation) Porto
7	FW	Diogo Gonçalves	6 February 1997 (aged 17)	14	3	(Portuguese Football Federation) Benfica
8	MF	Gonçalo Rodrigues	18 July 1997 (aged 16)	16	2	(Portuguese Football Federation) Benfica
9	FW	Alexandre Silva	16 March 1997 (aged 17)	11	4	(Portuguese Football Federation) Sporting
10	FW	**Renato Sanches**	18 August 1997 (aged 16)	16	3	(Portuguese Football Federation) Benfica
11	FW	Luís Mata	6 July 1997 (aged 16)	19	1	(Portuguese Football Federation) Porto
12	GK	Fábio Duarte	11 May 1998 (aged 15)	3	0	(Portuguese Football Federation) Benfica
13	DF	Ferro	26 March 1997 (aged 17)	10	0	(Portuguese Football Federation) Benfica
14	MF	Pedro Empis	1 February 1997 (aged 17)	8	0	(Portuguese Football Federation) Sporting
15	MF	João Carvalho	9 March 1997 (aged 17)	8	1	(Portuguese Football Federation) Benfica
16	DF	Diogo Izata	6 January 1997 (aged 17)	10	0	(Portuguese Football Federation) Porto
17	MF	Pedro Delgado	7 April 1997 (aged 17)	3	1	(Italian Football Federation) Internazionale
18	FW	Aurélio Buta	10 February 1997 (aged 17)	14	2	(Portuguese Football Federation) Benfica

=== Germany ===
Head coach: Christian Wück

No.	Pos.	Player	Date of birth (age)	Caps	Goals	Club
1	GK	Timo Königsmann	5 April 1997 (aged 17)	3	0	(German Football Association) Hannover 96
2	DF	Robin Tim Becker	18 January 1997 (aged 17)	3	0	(German Football Association) Bayer 04 Leverkusen
3	DF	Nicolas Clasen	25 February 1997 (aged 17)	3	0	(German Football Association) Borussia Mönchengladbach
4	DF	Matthias Bader	17 June 1997 (aged 16)	3	0	(German Football Association) Karlsruher SC
5	DF	Benedikt Gimber	19 February 1997 (aged 17)	3	0	(German Football Association) TSG 1899 Hoffenheim
6	MF	Damir Bektić	30 January 1997 (aged 17)	3	0	(German Football Association) Hertha BSC
7	FW	**Arianit Ferati**	7 September 1997 (aged 16)	3	1	(German Football Association) VfB Stuttgart
8	FW	**Benjamin Henrichs**	23 February 1997 (aged 17)	6	1	(German Football Association) Bayer 04 Leverkusen
9	FW	Philipp Ochs	17 April 1997 (aged 17)	3	3	(German Football Association) TSG 1899 Hoffenheim
10	MF	Max Besuschkow	31 May 1997 (aged 16)	3	1	(German Football Association) VfB Stuttgart
11	MF	Oğuzhan Aydoğan	4 February 1997 (aged 17)	2	1	(German Football Association) FC Schalke 04
12	GK	Patrick Bade	10 January 1997 (aged 17)	0	0	(German Football Association) Bayer 04 Leverkusen
13	DF	Lukas Boeder	18 April 1997 (aged 17)	2	0	(German Football Association) Bayer 04 Leverkusen
14	DF	Patrick Kammerbauer	11 February 1997 (aged 17)	1	0	(German Football Association) 1. FC Nürnberg
15	MF	Ole Käuper	9 January 1997 (aged 17)	3	1	(German Football Association) SV Werder Bremen
16	FW	Finn Porath	23 February 1997 (aged 17)	2	0	(German Football Association) Hamburger SV
17	MF	David Sauerland	28 June 1997 (aged 16)	1	0	(German Football Association) Borussia Dortmund
18	FW	Alessandro Fiore Tapia	4 March 1997 (aged 17)	2	1	(German Football Association) SC Freiburg

=== Scotland ===
Head coach: (Scotland) Scot Gemmill

No.	Pos.	Player	Date of birth (age)	Caps	Goals	Club
1	GK	Robby McCrorie	18 March 1998 (aged 16)	5	0	(Scottish Football Association) Rangers
2	DF	Sam Wardrop	20 October 1997 (aged 16)	6	0	(Scottish Football Association) Celtic
3	DF	Tom Lang	12 June 1997 (aged 16)	5	1	(The Football Association) Birmingham City
4	DF	Jack Breslin	6 April 1997 (aged 17)	6	0	(Scottish Football Association) Celtic
5	DF	Kyle Cameron	15 January 1997 (aged 17)	3	0	(The Football Association) Newcastle United
6	MF	Joe Thomson	14 January 1997 (aged 17)	4	0	(Scottish Football Association) Celtic
7	MF	Aidan Nesbitt	5 February 1997 (aged 17)	6	1	(Scottish Football Association) Celtic
8	DF	Michael Kelly	3 November 1997 (aged 16)	5	0	(Scottish Football Association) Aberdeen
9	FW	Craig Wighton	27 July 1997 (aged 16)	10	5	(Scottish Football Association) Dundee
10	FW	Steven Boyd	12 April 1997 (aged 17)	5	0	(Scottish Football Association) Celtic
11	FW	Scott Wright	8 August 1997 (aged 16)	3	1	(Scottish Football Association) Aberdeen
12	GK	Devlin MacKay	23 January 1997 (aged 17)	1	0	(Scottish Football Association) Kilmarnock
13	FW	Calvin Miller	9 January 1998 (aged 16)	4	0	(Scottish Football Association) Celtic
14	FW	Ryan Hardie	17 March 1997 (aged 17)	3	0	(Scottish Football Association) Rangers
15	DF	Aidan McIlduff	20 April 1997 (aged 17)	3	0	(Scottish Football Association) Celtic
16	DF	Zak Jules	7 February 1997 (aged 17)	0	0	(The Football Association) Reading
17	DF	Cammy Ballantyne	13 April 1997 (aged 17)	4	1	(Scottish Football Association) Dundee United
18	DF	Jake Sheppard	30 May 1997 (aged 16)	2	1	(The Football Association) Reading

=== Switzerland ===
Head coach: (Switzerland) Yves Débonnaire

No.	Pos.	Player	Date of birth (age)	Caps	Goals	Club
1	GK	**Gregor Kobel**	6 December 1997 (aged 16)	1	0	(Swiss Football Association) Grasshopper
2	DF	Samir Bajrami	3 July 1997 (aged 16)	6	0	(Swiss Football Association) Grasshopper
3	DF	Tobias Schättin	5 June 1997 (aged 16)	5	0	(Swiss Football Association) Winterthur
4	DF	Alban Selmanaj	19 April 1997 (aged 17)	4	0	(Swiss Football Association) Basel
5	DF	**Mirlind Kryeziu**	26 January 1997 (aged 17)	6	0	(Swiss Football Association) Zürich
6	MF	Remo Arnold	17 January 1997 (aged 17)	5	0	(Swiss Football Association) Luzern
7	MF	Arxhend Cani	2 August 1997 (aged 16)	6	1	(Swiss Football Association) Basel
8	MF	**Djibril Sow**	6 February 1997 (aged 17)	6	0	(Swiss Football Association) Zürich
9	FW	**Albian Ajeti**	26 February 1997 (aged 17)	8	6	(Swiss Football Association) Basel
10	MF	**Dimitri Oberlin**	27 September 1997 (aged 16)	3	0	(Swiss Football Association) Zürich
11	MF	Roberto Alves	8 June 1997 (aged 16)	6	2	(Swiss Football Association) Grasshopper
12	GK	Senad Mujovic	26 May 1997 (aged 16)			(Swiss Football Association) Grasshopper
13	DF	Noah Loosli	23 January 1997 (aged 17)	4	0	(Swiss Football Association) Grasshopper
14	MF	Robin Huser	24 January 1998 (aged 16)			(Swiss Football Association) Basel
15	DF	Harun Alpsoy	3 March 1997 (aged 17)	2	1	(Swiss Football Association) Grasshopper
16	DF	**Kevin Rüegg**	5 August 1998 (aged 15)			(Swiss Football Association) Zürich
17	MF	**Dereck Kutesa**	6 December 1997 (aged 16)	4	0	(Swiss Football Association) Servette
18	FW	Boris Babic	12 November 1997 (aged 16)	2	1	(Swiss Football Association) St. Gallen
