= 2020–21 Plymouth Argyle F.C. season =

English football club season

Plymouth Argyle
2020–21 season
- Chairman: Simon Hallett
- Manager: Ryan Lowe
- Stadium: Home Park
- League One: 18th
- FA Cup: Fourth round
- EFL Cup: Second round
- EFL Trophy: Group stage
- Top goalscorer: League: Luke Jephcott (16); All: Luke Jephcott (18)
- Highest home attendance: 2,000 (vs MK Dons, 19th Dec 2020) (vs Oxford United, 29th Dec 2020)
- Lowest home attendance: Behind closed doors
Home colours	Away colours	Third colours

The 2020–21 season is Plymouth Argyle's 135th in existence and their first season back in EFL League One. Along with competing in League One, the club will also participate in the FA Cup, EFL Cup, and EFL Trophy.

The season covers the period from 1 July 2020 to 30 June 2021.

== First-team squad ==
As of 18 January 2021

Note: Flags indicate national team as has been defined under FIFA eligibility rules. Players may hold more than one non-FIFA nationality.

No.	Name	Nat.	Position(s)	Date of birth (age)	Apps.	Goals	Year signed	Signed from	Transfer fee
Goalkeepers
1	Michael Cooper	(England)	GK	8 October 1999 (age 26)	58	0	2017	Academy	Trainee
23	Luke McCormick	(England)	GK	15 August 1983 (age 43)	377	0	2020	(England) Swindon Town	Free
26	Jack Ruddy	(Scotland)	GK	27 December 1997 (age 28)	2	0	2020	(Spain) CD Leganés B	Free
Defenders
2	Kelland Watts	(England)	CB/DM	3 November 1999 (age 26)	49	3	2020	(England) Newcastle United	Loan
3	Gary Sawyer	(England)	CB/LB	5 July 1985 (age 41)	298	6	2015	(England) Leyton Orient	Free
4	Will Aimson	(England)	CB/DM	1 January 1994 (age 32)	53	2	2019	(England) Bury	Free
22	Adam Lewis	(England)	LB/LM/DM	8 November 1999 (age 26)	20	1	2021	(England) Liverpool	Loan
24	Jerome Opoku	(England)	CB/LB	14 October 1998 (age 27)	38	1	2020	(England) Fulham	Loan
25	Sam Woods	(England)	CB/RB/DM	11 September 1998 (age 28)	9	1	2021	(England) Crystal Palace	Loan
27	Ryan Law	(England)	LB	8 September 1999 (age 27)	7	0	2018	Academy	Trainee
41	Ollie Tomlinson	(England)	CB	19 May 2002 (age 24)	2	0	2020	Academy	Trainee
Midfielders
8	Joe Edwards	(England)	RM/CM/RB	31 October 1990 (age 35)	87	12	2019	(England) Walsall	Free
10	Danny Mayor	(England)	LM/AM/CM	18 October 1990 (age 35)	87	3	2019	(England) Bury	Free
14	Ben Reeves	(England)	AM/CM/LM	19 November 1991 (age 34)	31	2	2020	(England) Milton Keynes Dons	Free
15	Conor Grant	(England)	CM/LM/RM	18 April 1995 (age 31)	83	6	2018	(England) Everton	Free
16	Lewis Macleod	(Scotland)	CM/AM/LM	16 June 1994 (age 32)	17	0	2020	(England) Wigan Athletic	Free
17	Byron Moore	(England)	RW/LW	24 August 1988 (age 38)	78	7	2019	(England) Bury	Free
18	Tyrese Fornah	(England)	CM/DM/AM	11 September 1999 (age 27)	43	0	2020	(England) Nottingham Forest	Loan
28	Panutche Camará	(Guinea-Bissau)	AM/CM/SS	28 February 1997 (age 29)	47	5	2020	(England) Crawley Town	Free
32	George Cooper	(England)	LW/RW/AM	30 October 1996 (age 29)	48	6	2020	(England) Peterborough United	Undisclosed
42	Jarvis Cleal	(England)	CM/RWB	1 April 2002 (age 24)	1	0	2020	(England) West Bromwich Albion	Free
Forwards
7	Frank Nouble	(England)	CF/RW/LW	24 September 1991 (age 34)	32	2	2020	(England) Colchester United	Free
9	Ryan Hardie	(Scotland)	CF/RW/LW	17 March 1997 (age 29)	63	13	2021	(England) Blackpool	Undisclosed
19	Klaidi Lolos	(Greece)	CF	6 October 2000 (age 25)	15	1	2019	Academy	Trainee
21	Niall Ennis	(England)	CF/LW	20 May 1999 (age 27)	23	6	2021	(England) Wolverhampton Wanderers	Undisclosed
31	Luke Jephcott	(Wales)	CF/RW/LW	26 January 2000 (age 26)	69	25	2018	Academy	Trainee
33	Rubin Wilson	(England)	CF	8 October 2001 (age 24)	1	0	2019	Academy	Trainee

=== Statistics ===
As of game played on 5 May 2021

No.	Pos	Nat	Player	Total		League One		FA Cup		League Cup		League Trophy	
No.	Pos	Nat	Player	Apps	Goals	Apps	Goals	Apps	Goals	Apps	Goals	Apps	Goals
1	GK	(England) ENG	Michael Cooper	51	0	45+0	0	4+0	0	2+0	0	0+0	0
2	DF	(England) ENG	Kelland Watts	49	3	41+2	2	4+0	0	2+0	1	0+0	0
3	DF	(England) ENG	Gary Sawyer	1	0	0+0	0	0+0	0	0+0	0	1+0	0
4	DF	(England) ENG	Will Aimson	46	0	39+1	0	3+0	0	2+0	0	1+0	0
5	DF	(England) ENG	Scott Wootton	16	0	7+3	0	1+1	0	2+0	0	2+0	0
7	FW	(England) ENG	Frank Nouble	31	2	12+12	1	1+3	0	1+1	1	1+0	0
8	MF	(England) ENG	Joe Edwards	47	8	34+5	6	4+0	1	1+1	1	1+1	0
9	FW	(Scotland) SCO	Ryan Hardie	50	6	25+17	5	3+1	1	2+0	0	1+1	0
10	MF	(England) ENG	Danny Mayor	48	2	43+0	1	3+0	0	2+0	1	0+0	0
14	MF	(England) ENG	Ben Reeves	31	2	4+23	0	1+1	1	0+0	0	2+0	1
15	MF	(England) ENG	Conor Grant	46	4	34+4	4	3+1	0	1+1	0	1+1	0
16	MF	(Scotland) SCO	Lewis Macleod	17	0	10+5	0	0+0	0	2+0	0	0+0	0
17	MF	(England) ENG	Byron Moore	42	2	16+21	2	1+2	0	1+0	0	1+0	0
18	MF	(England) ENG	Tyrese Fornah	42	0	32+5	0	4+0	0	0+0	0	1+0	0
19	FW	(Greece) GRE	Klaidi Lolos	9	1	0+7	0	0+0	0	0+0	0	2+0	1
20	MF	(England) ENG	Adam Randell	1	0	0+0	0	0+0	0	0+0	0	1+0	0
21	FW	(England) ENG	Niall Ennis	23	6	17+6	6	0+0	0	0+0	0	0+0	0
22	DF	(England) ENG	Adam Lewis	20	1	9+11	1	0+0	0	0+0	0	0+0	0
23	GK	(England) ENG	Luke McCormick	2	0	0+1	0	0+0	0	0+0	0	1+0	0
24	DF	(England) ENG	Jerome Opoku	38	1	30+3	1	3+1	0	0+0	0	0+1	0
25	DF	(England) ENG	Sam Woods	9	1	5+4	1	0+0	0	0+0	0	0+0	0
26	GK	(Scotland) SCO	Jack Ruddy	2	0	0+0	0	0+0	0	0+0	0	2+0	0
27	DF	(England) ENG	Ryan Law	7	0	3+0	0	0+0	0	0+1	0	3+0	0
28	MF	(Guinea-Bissau) GBS	Panutche Camará	46	5	33+6	2	3+1	2	1+1	1	1+0	0
29	FW	(England) ENG	Timmy Abraham	4	0	1+2	0	0+0	0	0+0	0	1+0	0
31	FW	(Wales) WAL	Luke Jephcott	45	18	31+9	16	4+0	2	0+0	0	1+0	0
32	MF	(England) ENG	George Cooper	17	3	10+2	1	1+0	0	2+0	0	1+1	2
36	MF	(England) ENG	Finley Craske	1	0	0+0	0	0+0	0	0+0	0	0+1	0
37	FW	(England) ENG	Brandon Pursall	3	0	0+0	0	0+0	0	0+0	0	2+1	0
38	MF	(United States) USA	Ethan Mitchell	1	0	0+0	0	0+0	0	0+0	0	0+1	0
39	FW	(England) ENG	Scott Crocker	1	0	0+0	0	0+0	0	0+0	0	0+1	0
41	DF	(England) ENG	Ollie Tomlinson	2	0	0+1	0	0+0	0	0+0	0	1+0	0
Players who left the club:
6	DF	(Republic of Ireland) IRL	Niall Canavan	15	1	10+2	1	1+0	0	0+0	0	2+0	0
11	FW	(England) ENG	Dom Telford	24	2	2+14	1	0+3	0	1+1	0	3+0	1

=== Goals record ===
As of 5 May 2021

Rank	No.	Nat.	Po.	Name	League One	FA Cup	League Cup	League Trophy	Total
1	31	(Wales)	CF	Luke Jephcott	16	2	0	0	18
2	8	(England)	RM	Joe Edwards	6	1	1	0	8
3	9	(Scotland)	CF	Ryan Hardie	5	1	0	0	6
3	21	(England)	CF	Niall Ennis	6	0	0	0	6
5	28	(Guinea-Bissau)	AM	Panutche Camará	2	2	1	0	5
6	15	(England)	CM	Conor Grant	4	0	0	0	4
7	2	(England)	CB	Kelland Watts	2	0	1	0	3
7	32	(England)	AM	George Cooper	1	0	0	2	3
9	7	(England)	CF	Frank Nouble	1	0	1	0	2
9	10	(England)	LM	Danny Mayor	1	0	1	0	2
9	11	(England)	CF	Dom Telford	1	0	0	1	2
9	14	(England)	AM	Ben Reeves	0	1	0	1	2
9	17	(England)	RM	Byron Moore	2	0	0	0	2
14	~~6~~	(Republic of Ireland)	CB	Niall Canavan	1	0	0	0	1
14	19	(Greece)	CF	Klaidi Lolos	0	0	0	1	1
14	22	(England)	LB	Adam Lewis	1	0	0	0	1
14	24	(England)	CB	Jerome Opoku	1	0	0	0	1
14	25	(England)	CB	Sam Woods	1	0	0	0	1
Own Goals					1	0	0	0	1
Total					52	7	5	5	69

=== Disciplinary record ===
As of 5 May 2021

Rank	No.	Nat.	Po.	Name	League One			FA Cup			League Cup			League Trophy			Total		
Rank	No.	Nat.	Po.	Name	Booked	(yellow card) (yellow-red card)	Sent off (straight red)	Booked	(yellow card) (yellow-red card)	Sent off (straight red)	Booked	(yellow card) (yellow-red card)	Sent off (straight red)	Booked	(yellow card) (yellow-red card)	Sent off (straight red)	Booked	(yellow card) (yellow-red card)	Sent off (straight red)
1	24	(England)	LB	Jerome Opoku	10	1	0	1	0	0	0	0	0	0	0	0	11	1	0
2	2	(England)	CB	Kelland Watts	8	0	0	1	0	0	0	0	0	0	0	0	9	0	0
2	8	(England)	RM	Joe Edwards	9	0	0	0	0	0	0	0	0	0	0	0	9	0	0
4	7	(England)	CF	Frank Nouble	5	0	0	1	0	0	1	0	0	1	0	0	8	0	0
5	18	(England)	DM	Tyrese Fornah	7	0	0	0	0	0	0	0	0	0	0	0	7	0	0
6	~~6~~	(Republic of Ireland)	CB	Niall Canavan	2	1	0	1	0	0	0	0	0	0	0	0	3	1	0
6	10	(England)	LM	Danny Mayor	3	1	0	0	0	0	0	0	0	0	0	0	3	1	0
6	28	(Guinea-Bissau)	AM	Panutche Camará	3	1	0	0	0	0	0	0	0	0	0	0	3	1	0
9	9	(Scotland)	CF	Ryan Hardie	3	0	0	0	0	0	0	0	0	0	0	0	3	0	0
9	16	(Scotland)	CM	Lewis Macleod	3	0	0	0	0	0	0	0	0	0	0	0	3	0	0
9	22	(England)	LB	Adam Lewis	3	0	0	0	0	0	0	0	0	0	0	0	3	0	0
12	1	(England)	GK	Michael Cooper	2	0	0	0	0	0	0	0	0	0	0	0	2	0	0
12	5	(England)	CB	Scott Wootton	2	0	0	0	0	0	0	0	0	0	0	0	2	0	0
12	27	(England)	LB	Ryan Law	1	0	0	0	0	0	0	0	0	1	0	0	2	0	0
12	32	(England)	AM	George Cooper	1	0	0	0	0	0	0	0	0	1	0	0	2	0	0
16	4	(England)	CB	Will Aimson	1	0	0	0	0	0	0	0	0	0	0	0	1	0	0
16	14	(England)	AM	Ben Reeves	1	0	0	0	0	0	0	0	0	0	0	0	1	0	0
16	17	(England)	RW	Byron Moore	1	0	0	0	0	0	0	0	0	0	0	0	1	0	0
16	21	(England)	CF	Niall Ennis	1	0	0	0	0	0	0	0	0	0	0	0	1	0	0
16	25	(England)	CB	Sam Woods	0	0	1	0	0	0	0	0	0	0	0	0	0	0	1
16	31	(Wales)	CF	Luke Jephcott	1	0	0	0	0	0	0	0	0	0	0	0	1	0	0
Total					66	4	1	4	0	0	1	0	0	3	0	0	73	4	1

== Transfers ==
=== Transfers in ===
Date	Position	Nationality	Name	From	Fee	Ref.
28 July 2020	GK	(England)	Luke McCormick	(England) Swindon Town	Free transfer	
3 August 2020	CF	(England)	Frank Nouble	(England) Colchester United	Free transfer	
7 August 2020	AM	(Guinea-Bissau)	Panutche Camará	(England) Crawley Town	Free transfer	
17 August 2020	CM	(Scotland)	Lewis Macleod	(England) Wigan Athletic	Free transfer	
2 September 2020	LW	(England)	George Cooper	(England) Peterborough United	Undisclosed	
3 September 2020	AM	(Northern Ireland)	Ben Reeves	(England) Milton Keynes Dons	Free transfer	
6 September 2020	GK	(Scotland)	Jack Ruddy	(Spain) Leganés	Free transfer	
18 January 2021	CF	(England)	Niall Ennis	(England) Wolverhampton Wanderers	Undisclosed	
29 January 2021	CF	(Scotland)	Ryan Hardie	(England) Blackpool	Undisclosed	

=== Loans in ===
Date	Position	Nationality	Name	From	Date until	Ref.
29 July 2020	CF	(Scotland)	Ryan Hardie	(England) Blackpool	29 January 2021	
24 August 2020	CB	(England)	Kelland Watts	(England) Newcastle United	End of season	
25 September 2020	LB	(England)	Jerome Opoku	(England) Fulham	31 January 2021	
2 October 2020	CM	(England)	Tyrese Fornah	(England) Nottingham Forest	End of season	
16 October 2020	CF	(England)	Timmy Abraham	(England) Fulham	24 December 2020	
14 January 2021	LB	(England)	Adam Lewis	(England) Liverpool	End of season	
31 January 2021	CB	(England)	Sam Woods	(England) Crystal Palace	End of season	

=== Loans out ===
Date	Position	Nationality	Name	To	Date until	Ref.
14 August 2020	CF	(England)	Rubin Wilson	(England) Plymouth Parkway	7 September 2020 (Note: Loan cut short to join Dorchester Town on loan)	
7 September 2020	CF	(England)	Rubin Wilson	(England) Dorchester Town	7 December 2020	
11 September 2020	CB	(England)	Ollie Tomlinson	(England) Barnstaple Town	October 2020	
3 October 2020	DM	(England)	Adam Randell	(England) Torquay United	16 January 2021	
11 December 2020	LB	(England)	Ryan Law	(England) Chippenham Town	January 2021	
11 December 2020	CF	(Greece)	Klaidi Lolos	(England) Chippenham Town	January 2021	
1 February 2021	CF	(England)	Frank Nouble	(England) Colchester United	End of Season	
1 February 2021	CB	(England)	Scott Wootton	(England) Wigan Athletic	End of season	
15 March 2021	LB	(England)	Ryan Law	(England) Torquay United	April 2021	

=== Transfers out ===
Date from	Position	Nationality	Name	To	Fee	Ref.
1 July 2020	AM	(England)	Jude Boyd	(England) Mousehole	Free transfer	
1 July 2020	CB	(England)	Isaac Burdon	(England) Plymouth Parkway	Free transfer	
1 July 2020	LB	(England)	Reuben Collum	Unattached	Released	
1 July 2020	CF	(England)	Alex Fletcher	(England) Tiverton Town	Released	
1 July 2020	RW	(Jamaica)	Joel Grant	(England) Swindon Town	Released	
1 July 2020	RB	(England)	Tafari Moore	Unattached	Released	
1 July 2020	CB	(England)	Michael Peck	(England) Tiverton Town	Released	
1 July 2020	DM	(England)	Tom Purrington	(England) Bromley	Released	
1 July 2020	CF	(England)	Ryan Taylor	(Wales) Newport County	Released	
1 July 2020	GK	(England)	Harry Townsend	(United States) Missouri State Bears	Released	
1 July 2020	CM	(England)	Antoni Sarcevic	(England) Bolton Wanderers	Released	
30 July 2020	LM	(Scotland)	Callum McFadzean	(England) Sunderland	Released	
12 January 2021	CB	(Republic of Ireland)	Niall Canavan	(England) Bradford City	Undisclosed	
28 January 2021	CF	(England)	Dom Telford	(Wales) Newport County	Undisclosed	
6 May 2021	CB	(England)	Gary Sawyer	Retired	—N/a	

== Pre-season ==
8 August 2020 Friendly	Plymouth Argyle	2–1	Plymouth Parkway	Plymouth
15:00 BST	Miller 36'; Jephcott 49'	Report	Allen 22'	Stadium: Home Park; Attendance: 0 Referee: Marc Whaley

19 August 2020 Friendly	Rangers XI	3–2	Plymouth Argyle	Milngavie, Scotland
14:00 BST	10'; 26'; 88'	Report	Trialist 46'; Sawyer 63'	Stadium: Rangers Training Centre; Attendance: 0 Referee: David Lowe

25 August 2020 Friendly	Plymouth Argyle	0–1	Middlesbrough	Plymouth
14:00 BST		Report	Assombalonga 33'	Stadium: Home Park; Attendance: 0 Referee: Lee Swabey

29 August 2020 Friendly	Plymouth Argyle	2–1	Forest Green Rovers	Plymouth
13:00 BST	Hardie 41'; Jephcott 87'	Report	Sweeney 50'	Stadium: Home Park; Attendance: 0 Referee: Brett Huxtable

== Competitions ==
=== EFL League One ===
==== League table ====
Pos	Team	Pld	W	D	L	GF	GA	GD	Pts	Promotion, qualification or relegation
14	Doncaster Rovers	46	19	7	20	63	67	−4	64	
15	Fleetwood Town	46	16	12	18	49	46	+3	60	
16	Burton Albion	46	15	12	19	61	73	−12	57	
17	Shrewsbury Town	46	13	15	18	50	57	−7	54	
18	Plymouth Argyle	46	14	11	21	53	80	−27	53	
19	AFC Wimbledon	46	12	15	19	54	70	−16	51	
20	Wigan Athletic	46	13	9	24	54	77	−23	48	
21	Rochdale (R)	46	11	14	21	61	78	−17	47	Relegation to EFL League Two
22	Northampton Town (R)	46	11	12	23	41	67	−26	45	Relegation to EFL League Two

Source: EFL Official Website
Rules for classification: 1) Points; 2) Goal difference; 3) Number of goals scored; 4) Head-to-head results; 5) Wins; 6) Away goals; 7) Penalty points (sec 9.5); 8) 12-point sending off offences
(R) Relegated

==== Results summary ====
Overall								Home						Away					
Pld	W	D	L	GF	GA	GD	Pts	W	D	L	GF	GA	GD	W	D	L	GF	GA	GD
46	14	11	21	53	80	−27	53	11	4	8	31	39	−8	3	7	13	22	41	−19

Last updated: 9 May 2021.
Source: BBC

==== Results by matchday ====
Matchday	1	2	3	4	5	6	7	8	9	10	11	12	13	14	15	16	17	18	19	20	21	22	23	24	25	26	27	28	29	30	31	32	33	34	35	36	37	38	39	40	41	42	43	44	45	46
Ground	H	A	H	A	H	H	A	A	H	H	H	A	A	H	H	A	A	H	A	H	H	H	A	A	H	A	A	H	A	H	H	A	A	H	A	A	H	A	H	A	H	A	H	A	H	A
Result	W	D	D	L	W	W	L	D	W	W	D	L	L	L	L	L	L	W	D	L	W	D	W	W	D	D	W	W	D	L	W	L	L	L	L	L	W	D	W	L	L	D	L	L	L	L
Position	8	5	9	13	8	6	9	9	8	8	9	10	11	15	15	16	19	14	14	17	15	15	11	13	13	12	12	10	10	12	10	12	14	15	16	16	16	16	14	16	16	16	16	18	18	18

Updated to match(es) played on 1 May 2021. Source: 11v11 for league tables and fixtures
A = Away; H = Home; W = Win; D = Draw; L = Loss

==== Matches ====
Win Draw Loss Postponed

The 2020–21 season fixtures were released on 21 August.

12 September 2020 1	Plymouth Argyle	1–0	Blackpool	Plymouth
15:00 BST	Jephcott 3'	Report		Stadium: Home Park; Referee: Kevin Johnson

19 September 2020 2	AFC Wimbledon	4–4	Plymouth Argyle	Shepherd's Bush
15:00 BST	Pigott 18', 60'; Woodyard (yellow card) 38'; McLoughlin 49'; Longman 69'	Report	Cooper 16'; Grant 45'; Canavan 76'; Telford 78'; Nouble (yellow card) 85'; MacLeod (yellow card) 90+3'	Stadium: Kiyan Prince Foundation Stadium; Attendance: 0 Referee: Trevor Kettle

26 September 2020 3	Plymouth Argyle	1–1	Shrewsbury Town	Plymouth
15:00 BST	Grant 29'; Canavan (yellow card) 73'	Report	Vela 14'	Stadium: Home Park; Attendance: 0 Referee: Tim Robinson

3 October 2020 4	Hull City	1–0	Plymouth Argyle	Kingston upon Hull
15:00 BST	Adelakun 10'	Report	Opoku (yellow card) 57'	Stadium: KCOM Stadium; Attendance: 0 Referee: Robert Lewis

10 October 2020 5	Plymouth Argyle	2–0	Burton Albion	Plymouth
15:00 BST	Jephcott 25'; Moore 47'; Watts (yellow card) 63'; Canavan (yellow card) 72'	Report	Hemmings (yellow card) 58'; Daniel (yellow card) 83'	Stadium: Home Park; Attendance: 0 Referee: David Rock

17 October 2020 6	Plymouth Argyle	2–1	Northampton Town	Plymouth
15:00 BST	Moore (yellow card) 21'; Nouble 41'; Cooper (yellow card) 50'; Watts 86'	Report	Watson (yellow card) 43'; Korboa 62'; Rose (yellow card) 66'; Bolger (yellow card) 90+2'	Stadium: Home Park; Attendance: 0 Referee: Craig Hicks

20 October 2020 7	Lincoln City	2–0	Plymouth Argyle	Lincoln
19:00 BST	Jones (yellow card) 11'; Walsh (yellow card) 21'; Grant 50' (pen.); Johnson 72'	Report	Nouble (yellow card) 19'	Stadium: LNER Stadium; Attendance: 0 Referee: Christopher Pollard

24 October 2020 8	Wigan Athletic	1–1	Plymouth Argyle	Wigan
15:00 BST	Tilt (yellow card) 41'; Keane 69'	Report	Hardie 34'; Edwards (yellow card) 70'	Stadium: DW Stadium; Attendance: 0 Referee: Scott Oldham

27 October 2020 9	Plymouth Argyle	2–1	Doncaster Rovers	Plymouth
19:45 GMT	Jephcott 34'; Edwards (yellow card) 65' (goal) 68'; Hardie (yellow card) 81'; Cooper (yellow card) 90+3'	Report	Okenabirhie 73'; James (yellow card) 85'	Stadium: Home Park; Referee: Alan Young

3 November 2020 10	Plymouth Argyle	4–2	Swindon Town	Plymouth
19:00 GMT	Jephcott 6', 25'; Edwards 7'; Fornah (yellow card) 14'; Hardie (yellow card) 76'; Grant 89'	Report	Payne (yellow card) 4'; Hope 10'; Grant 23'; J. Smith (yellow card) 38' (yellow-red card) 45+4'; M. Smith (yellow card) 62'	Stadium: Home Park; Attendance: 0 Referee: John Busby

16 November 2020 11	Plymouth Argyle	2–2	Portsmouth	Plymouth
19:45 GMT	Raggett 11' (o.g.); Opoku (yellow card) 71' (goal) 78'; Reeves (yellow card) 86'	Report	Marquis (yellow card) 33' (goal) 63' (pen.); Naylor 65' (yellow card) 86'; Cannon (yellow card) 73'	Stadium: Home Park; Attendance: 0 Referee: Charles Breakspear

21 November 2020 12	Fleetwood Town	5–1	Plymouth Argyle	Fleetwood
15:00 GMT	Finley 4'; Camps 7', 67'; Andrew (yellow card) 24'; Burns 38'; Mulgrew 55'	Report	Canavan (yellow card) 52' (yellow-red card) 90+1'; Edwards (yellow card) 74'; Jephcott 84'; Nouble (yellow card) 90+2'	Stadium: Highbury Stadium; Attendance: 0 Referee: Sam Barrott

24 November 2020 13	Peterborough United	1–0	Plymouth Argyle	Peterborough
19:00 GMT	Dembélé (yellow card) 18'; Clarke-Harris 41'	Report	Wootton (yellow card) 26'; Opoku (yellow card) 29'	Stadium: Weston Homes Stadium; Attendance: 0 Referee: Tom Nield

1 December 2020 14	Plymouth Argyle	0–4	Rochdale	Plymouth
19:45 GMT		Report	Beesley 3'; Morley 23'; Keohane 45+12'; Humphrys 72'	Stadium: Home Park; Attendance: 0 Referee: Will Finnie

5 December 2020 15	Plymouth Argyle	1–2	Ipswich Town	Plymouth
15:00 GMT	Jephcott 14'; Mayor (yellow card) 52' (yellow-red card) 70'; Nouble (yellow card) 71'; Watts (yellow card) 79'	Report	McGavin (yellow card) 50'; Nolan 73'; Jackson 74'; Cornell (yellow card) 90+2'	Stadium: Home Park; Attendance: 1,808; Referee: Ollie Yates

12 December 2020 16	Bristol Rovers	3–0	Plymouth Argyle	Horfield
15:00 GMT	Kilgour 7'; McCormick 26'; Upson (yellow card) 68'; Westbrooke 85'	Report	Watts (yellow card) 40'; Fornah (yellow card) 45+2'	Stadium: Memorial Stadium; Attendance: 0 Referee: Carl Boyeson

15 December 2020 17	Crewe Alexandra	2–1	Plymouth Argyle	Crewe
19:00 GMT	Kirk 22'; Dale 43'	Report	Fornah (yellow card) 17'; Jephcott 85'	Stadium: Alexandra Stadium; Attendance: 2,000; Referee: Scott Oldham

19 December 2020 18	Plymouth Argyle	1–0	Milton Keynes Dons	Plymouth
15:00 GMT	Hardie 68'; Watts (yellow card) 80'	Report	Keogh (yellow card) 34'; Sørensen (yellow card) 44'; Kasumu (yellow card) 79'	Stadium: Home Park; Attendance: 2,000; Referee: Paul Howard

26 December 2020 19	Charlton Athletic	2–2	Plymouth Argyle	Charlton
15:00 GMT	Gunter 32'; Aneke (yellow card) 57'; Maddison 67'	Report	Jephcott 6', 36'; Aimson (yellow card) 52'; Macleod (yellow card) 69'; Edwards (yellow card) 70'	Stadium: The Valley; Attendance: 0 Referee: Andy Woolmer

29 December 2020 20	Plymouth Argyle	2–3	Oxford United	Plymouth
19:45 GMT	Camará 12'; Jephcott (yellow card) 65' (goal) 84' (pen.); Macleod (yellow card) 80'	Report	Kelly (yellow card) 32'; Ruffels 37'; Long 74' (yellow card) 90+1'; Clare (yellow card) 79'; Shodipo 82' (pen.); Moore (yellow card) 83'	Stadium: Home Park; Attendance: 2,000; Referee: Brett Huxtable

2 January 2021 21	Plymouth Argyle	1–0	Gillingham	Plymouth
15:00 GMT	Jephcott 33'; Nouble (yellow card) 86'	Report	Jackson (yellow card) 68'; Drysdale (yellow card) 88'	Stadium: Home Park; Attendance: 0 Referee: Sam Allison

16 January 2021 22	Plymouth Argyle	1–1	Crewe Alexandra	Plymouth
15:00 GMT	Jephcott 11' (pen.); Watts (yellow card) 26'; Edwards (yellow card) 58'; Opoku (yellow card) 60'; Mayor (yellow card) 74'; Camará (yellow card) 78' (yellow-red card) 90+3'	Report	Finney 64'; Offord (yellow card) 80'	Stadium: Home Park; Attendance: 0 Referee: Charles Breakspear

19 January 2021 23	Sunderland	1–2	Plymouth Argyle	Sunderland
19:00 GMT	Winchester (yellow card) 28'; O'Brien 51', (yellow card) 54'	Report	Lewis 11', (yellow card) 46'; Edwards 56'; Cooper (yellow card) 83'	Stadium: Stadium of Light; Attendance: 0 Referee: Robert Lewis

26 January 2021 24	Swindon Town	0–2	Plymouth Argyle	Swindon
19:00 GMT		Report	Camará 36'; Hardie 67'	Stadium: The County Ground; Attendance: 0 Referee: Bobby Madley

30 January 2021 25	Plymouth Argyle	2–2	Accrington Stanley	Plymouth
15:00 GMT	Jephcott 43'; Ennis 78'; Opoku (yellow card) 87'; Lewis (yellow card) 88'	Report	Pritchard 41'; Charles 46'; Barclay (yellow card) 63'; Butcher (yellow card) 74'	Stadium: Home Park; Attendance: 0 Referee: Neil Hair

6 February 2021 26	Portsmouth	2–2	Plymouth Argyle	Milton
15:00 GMT	Cannon (yellow card) 72'; Naylor (yellow card) 84'; Curtis 86'; Bolton 87'	Report	Jephcott 71', 82'	Stadium: Fratton Park; Attendance: 0 Referee: Will Finnie

9 February 2021 27	Accrington Stanley	0–1	Plymouth Argyle	Accrington
17:30 GMT	Conneely (yellow card) 62'	Report	Ennis 51'; Opoku (yellow card) 70'; Fornah (yellow card) 74'	Stadium: Wham Stadium; Attendance: 0 Referee: Tom Nield

13 February 2021 28	Plymouth Argyle	1–0	Fleetwood Town	Plymouth
15:00 GMT	Holgate 11' (o.g.); Opoku (yellow card) 49'	Report	Finley (yellow card) 77'; Saunders (yellow card) 90+1' Simon Grayson (yellow card)	Stadium: Home Park; Attendance: 0 Referee: Thomas Bramall

20 February 2021 29	Rochdale	0–0	Plymouth Argyle	Rochdale
15:00 GMT	McShane (yellow card) 18'; Baah (yellow card) 22'; McLaughlin (yellow card) 90'	Report	Opoku (yellow card) 47'	Stadium: Spotland; Attendance: 0 Referee: Peter Wright

23 February 2021 30	Plymouth Argyle	0–3	Peterborough United	Plymouth
19:30 GMT	Hardie (yellow card) 89'	Report	Beevers (yellow card) 22'; Szmodics 46'; Clarke-Harris 63'; Taylor 84'	Stadium: Home Park; Attendance: 0 Referee: Christopher Sarginson

27 February 2021 31	Plymouth Argyle	4–3	Lincoln City	Plymouth
15:00 GMT	Watts 3'; Mayor 13'; Fornah (yellow card) 27'; Edwards (yellow card) 63', (goal) 90+1'; Grant 77'	Report	McGrandles 22'; Grant 59' (pen.), 62' (pen.)	Stadium: Home Park; Attendance: 0 Referee: Kevin Johnson

2 March 2021 32	Northampton Town	2–0	Plymouth Argyle	Northampton
19:00 GMT	Mitchell (yellow card) 40'; Watson 40', 65'; Jones (yellow card) 54'; Hoskins (yellow card) 63'; Rose (yellow card) 90'	Report	Fornah (yellow card) 76'; Woods (red card) 90+1'	Stadium: PTS Academy Stadium; Attendance: 0 Referee: Graham Salisbury

6 March 2021 33	Doncaster Rovers	2–1	Plymouth Argyle	Doncaster
15:00 GMT	Anderson 7'; Bostock (yellow card) 39'; Bogle 47'	Report	Ennis 49'	Stadium: Keepmoat Stadium; Referee: Declan Bourne

9 March 2021 34	Plymouth Argyle	0–2	Wigan Athletic	Plymouth
19:00 GMT	Edwards (yellow card) 30'	Report	Solomon-Otabor 13'; Evans (yellow card) 16'; Tilt 32', (yellow card) 84'; Ojo (yellow card) 76'; Massey (yellow card) 88'	Stadium: Home Park; Attendance: 0 Referee: Gavin Ward

13 March 2021 35	Ipswich Town	1–0	Plymouth Argyle	Ipswich
15:00 GMT	Parrott 4'	Report		Stadium: Portman Road; Attendance: 0 Referee: Sam Purkiss

16 March 2021 36	Milton Keynes Dons	2–1	Plymouth Argyle	Denbigh
19:00 GMT	Jerome 22', (yellow card) 62'; O'Hora (yellow card) 76'; Fraser 89' (pen.)	Report	Mayor (yellow card) 45'; Grant 61'; Camará (yellow card) 89' Ryan Lowe (yellow card)	Stadium: Stadium:mk; Attendance: 0 Referee: Seb Stockbridge

20 March 2021 37	Plymouth Argyle	2–0	Bristol Rovers	Plymouth
15:00 GMT	Ennis 7', (yellow card) 18', (goal) 45'; Opoku (yellow card) 39'; Lewis (yellow card) 75'	Report		Stadium: Home Park; Attendance: 0 Referee: Trevor Kettle

27 March 2021 38	Blackpool	2–2	Plymouth Argyle	Blackpool
15:00 GMT	Kaikai 47'; Yates 64' (pen.)	Report	Hardie 12'; Edwards 90+1'	Stadium: Bloomfield Road; Attendance: 0 Referee: Carl Brook

2 April 2021 39	Plymouth Argyle	1–0	AFC Wimbledon	Plymouth
15:00 BST	Woods 11'; Fornah (yellow card) 29'	Report		Stadium: Home Park; Attendance: 0 Referee: Sam Allison

5 April 2021 40	Shrewsbury Town	3–0	Plymouth Argyle	Shrewsbury
15:00 BST	Aimson 52' (o.g.); Norburn (yellow card) 75'; Whalley 77'; Ogbeta 81'; Vela (yellow card) 85'	Report	Camará (yellow card) 44'	Stadium: Montgomery Waters Meadow; Attendance: 0 Referee: Bobby Madley

10 April 2021 41	Plymouth Argyle	0–3	Hull City	Plymouth
15:00 BST	Watts (yellow card) 4'	Report	Lewis-Potter 11'; Magennis 58'; Docherty 74'	Stadium: Home Park; Attendance: 0 Referee: Ben Toner

17 April 2021 42	Burton Albion	1–1	Plymouth Argyle	Burton upon Trent
12:30 BST	Clare (yellow card) 19'; Broom 90+3'	Report	Watts (yellow card) 28'; Mayor (yellow card) 56'; Hardie 69'; Opoku (yellow card) 73'	Stadium: Pirelli Stadium; Attendance: 0 Referee: Antony Coggins

20 April 2021 43	Plymouth Argyle	0–6	Charlton Athletic	Plymouth
19:45 BST	Watts (yellow card) 26'	Report	Forster-Caskey 26'; Stockley 45'; Watts 47' (o.g.); Gilbey 49'; Millar 56'; Aneke 89'	Stadium: Home Park; Attendance: 0 Referee: Sam Purkiss

24 April 2021 44	Oxford United	3–1	Plymouth Argyle	Oxford
15:00 BST	Edwards 29' (o.g.); Taylor 69', 80'	Report	Ennis 65'; Edwards (yellow card) 76'	Stadium: The Kassam Stadium; Attendance: 0 Referee: Brett Huxtable

1 May 2021 45	Plymouth Argyle	1–3	Sunderland	Plymouth
15:00 BST	Camará (yellow card) 42'; Law (yellow card) 49'; Opoku (red card) 54'; Edwards 63', (yellow card) 76'	Report	Stewart 21'; Maguire 84' (pen.); Hume 90+2'	Stadium: Home Park; Attendance: 0 Referee: James Bell

9 May 2021 46	Gillingham	1–0	Plymouth Argyle	Gillingham
12:00 BST	Oliver 28'; O'Keefe (yellow card) 56'; Dempsey (yellow card) 70'	Report	Reeves (yellow card) 55'	Stadium: Priestfield Stadium; Attendance: 0 Referee: Alan Young

=== FA Cup ===
The draw for the first round was made on Monday 26, October. The second round draw was revealed on Monday, 9 November by Danny Cowley. The third round draw was made on 30 November, with Premier League and EFL Championship all entering the competition. The draw for the fourth and fifth round were made on 11 January, conducted by Peter Crouch.

Win Draw Loss

7 November 2020 First round	Charlton Athletic	0–1	Plymouth Argyle	Charlton
15:00 GMT	Levitt (yellow card) 21'; Aneke (yellow card) 61'; Forster-Caskey (yellow card) 72'	Report	Jephcott 60'; Nouble (yellow card) 88'	Stadium: The Valley; Attendance: 0 Referee: Neil Hair

28 November 2020 Second round	Plymouth Argyle	2–0	Lincoln City	Plymouth
15:00 GMT	Jephcott 6'; Canavan (yellow card) 55'; Reeves 55'; Opoku (yellow card) 85'	Report	Melbourne (yellow card) 21'; Walsh (yellow card) 54'; Johnson (yellow card) 55'; Edun (yellow card) 67'	Stadium: Home Park; Attendance: 0 Referee: David Rock

9 January 2021 Third round	Huddersfield Town	2–3	Plymouth Argyle	Huddersfield
18:00 GMT	Crichlow 4'; Olagunju (yellow card) 5'; Rowe 32'; Duhaney (yellow card) 34'	Report	Hardie 24'; Camará 42'; Edwards 70'	Stadium: The John Smith's Stadium; Attendance: 0 Referee: Martin Coy

23 January 2021 Fourth round	Sheffield United	2–1	Plymouth Argyle	Sheffield
15:00 GMT	Basham 39'; Sharp 47'; Norwood (yellow card) 68'	Report	Camará 75'; Watts (yellow card) 90+3'	Stadium: Bramall Lane; Attendance: 0 Referee: Lee Mason

=== EFL Cup ===
Win Draw Loss

The first round draw was made on 18 August, live on Sky Sports, by Paul Merson. The draw for both the second and third round were confirmed on September 6, live on Sky Sports by Phil Babb.

5 September 2020 First round	Plymouth Argyle	3–2	Queens Park Rangers	Plymouth
12:30 BST	Edwards 32'; Mayor 55'; Nouble 78' (yellow card) 82'	Report	Manning 2'; Kakay 57'	Stadium: Home Park; Attendance: 0 Referee: Antony Coggins

15 September 2020 Second round	Leyton Orient	3–2	Plymouth Argyle	Leyton
19:45 BST	Dennis 55'; McAnuff 74'; Johnson 90+3'	Report	Camará 19'; Watts 34'	Stadium: Breyer Group Stadium; Attendance: 0 Referee: Josh Smith

=== EFL Trophy ===
Win Draw Loss

The regional group stage draw was confirmed on 18 August.

Pos	Div	Team	Pld	W	PW	PL	L	GF	GA	GD	Pts	Qualification
1	L2	Cheltenham Town	3	3	0	0	0	4	0	+4	9	Advance to Round 2
2	ACA	Norwich City U21	3	2	0	0	1	8	3	+5	6	Advance to Round 2
3	L1	Plymouth Argyle	3	1	0	0	2	5	6	−1	3	
4	L2	Newport County	3	0	0	0	3	1	9	−8	0	

Source: EFL.com

8 September 2020 Group stage	Plymouth Argyle	2–3	Norwich City U21	Plymouth
19:45 BST	Lolos 39' (pen.); Telford 63'; Law (yellow card) 84'	Report	Hondermarck 26'; Omotoye 54'; Dennis 67'	Stadium: Home Park; Attendance: 0 Referee: Andy Davies

6 October 2020 Group stage	Cheltenham Town	2–0	Plymouth Argyle	Cheltenham
19:45 BST	Reid 56', 77'; May (yellow card) 81'	Report	Cooper (yellow card) 87'	Stadium: Whaddon Road; Attendance: 0 Referee: Chris Sarginson

10 November 2020 Group stage	Plymouth Argyle	3–1	Newport County	Plymouth
19:00 GMT	Nouble (yellow card) 22'; Reeves 30'; Cooper 48', 59'	Report	Baker (yellow card) 15'; Woodiwiss (yellow card) 42'; Amond 64'; Ellison (yellow card) 67'	Stadium: Home Park; Attendance: 0 Referee: Brett Huxtable
