= Trézel =

Trézel is a French surname. Notable people with the surname include:

- Camille Alphonse Trézel (1780–1860), French military leader
- Roger Trézel (1918–1986), French bridge player and writer

== See also ==
- Tezel
