= 2018–19 Crystal Palace F.C. season =

English football club season

Crystal Palace
2018–19 season
- Chairman: Steve Parish
- Manager: Roy Hodgson
- Stadium: Selhurst Park
- Premier League: 12th
- FA Cup: Quarter-finals
- EFL Cup: Fourth round
- Top goalscorer: Luka Milivojević (12)
- Highest home attendance: 25,789 v Everton; Premier League, 27 April 2019
- Lowest home attendance: 19,491 v Tottenham Hotspur, FA Cup, 27 January 2019
- Average home league attendance: 25,455
- Biggest win: 4–1 v Leicester City; Premier League, 23 Feb 2018
- Biggest defeat: 1–3 v 4 teams All Premier League
Home colours	Away colours	Third colours

The 2018–19 season was Crystal Palace's sixth consecutive season in the Premier League (extending their longest ever spell in the top division of English football) and the 113th year in their history. In this season, Palace participated in the Premier League, FA Cup and EFL Cup. The season covers the period from 1 July 2018 to 30 June 2019.

== Players ==
As of 1 February 2019

Note: Flags indicate national team as defined under FIFA eligibility rules; some limited exceptions apply. Players may hold more than one non-FIFA nationality.

No.	Pos.	Nation	Player
1	GK	ARG	Julián Speroni
2	DF	ENG	Joel Ward
3	DF	NED	Patrick van Aanholt
4	MF	SRB	Luka Milivojević (Captain)
5	DF	ENG	James Tomkins
6	DF	ENG	Scott Dann
7	MF	GER	Max Meyer
8	MF	SEN	Cheikhou Kouyaté
10	MF	ENG	Andros Townsend
11	FW	CIV	Wilfried Zaha
12	DF	FRA	Mamadou Sakho
13	GK	WAL	Wayne Hennessey
14	FW	GHA	Jordan Ayew (on loan from Swansea City)

No.	Pos.	Nation	Player
15	DF	GHA	Jeffrey Schlupp
17	FW	BEL	Christian Benteke
18	MF	SCO	James McArthur
21	FW	ENG	Connor Wickham
22	GK	BRA	Lucas Perri (on loan from São Paulo)
23	FW	BEL	Michy Batshuayi (on loan from Chelsea)
26	MF	MLI	Bakary Sako
27	DF	SEN	Pape Souaré
29	DF	ENG	Aaron Wan-Bissaka
31	GK	ESP	Vicente Guaita
34	DF	ENG	Martin Kelly
35	DF	ENG	Sam Woods
44	MF	NED	Jaïro Riedewald

== Friendlies ==
The club had a pre-season tour to Scandinavia to play FC Helsingør and Halmstads BK, first-team friendlies away against Oxford United and Reading, and at home to Toulouse, as well as Palace XI (mixture of first-team and Under-23s) fixtures against Bromley, Stevenage, Boreham Wood and Kingstonian.

12 July 2018 Friendly	FC Helsingør	2–2	Crystal Palace	Helsingør, Denmark
18:30 CEST	Doulgas 4'; Olsen 83'	Report	Sørloth 20'; Sakho 61'	Stadium: Helsingør Stadium; Attendance: 1,518

16 July 2018 Friendly	Halmstads BK	1–6	Crystal Palace	Halmstad, Sweden
18:30 CEST	Silfver 17'	Report	Benteke 13' van Aanholt 38', 40'; Kaikai 42'; McArthur 61'; Puncheon 66'	Stadium: Örjans Vall

21 July 2018 Friendly	Oxford United	1–3	Crystal Palace	Oxford
15:00 BST	Obika 36'	Report	Zaha 56'; Schlupp 61'; Kaikai 87'	Stadium: Kassam Stadium

24 July 2018 Friendly	Stevenage	1–2	Crystal Palace	Stevenage
19:45 BST	Reid 18'	Report	Williams 44'; Kaikai 89'	Stadium: Broadhall Way

28 July 2018 Friendly	Reading	0–4	Crystal Palace	Reading
15:00 BST		Report	Sørloth 33'; Zaha 48', 64'; Tomkins 69'	Stadium: Madejski Stadium

4 August 2018 Friendly	Crystal Palace	4–1	Toulouse	Selhurst
15:00 BST	Benteke 29'; Schlupp 32'; Milivojević 40' (pen.); Zaha 80'	Report	Iseka 10'	Stadium: Selhurst Park

11 October 2018 Friendly	Dulwich Hamlet	0–5	Crystal Palace	Mitcham
19:00 BST		Report	Meyer 15'; Kaikai 34'; Wickham 63'; Daly 67'; Flanagan 72'	Stadium: Imperial Fields

== Competitions ==
=== Premier League ===
==== League table ====
Pos	Team	Pld	W	D	L	GF	GA	GD	Pts
10	West Ham United	38	15	7	16	52	55	−3	52
11	Watford	38	14	8	16	52	59	−7	50
12	Crystal Palace	38	14	7	17	51	53	−2	49
13	Newcastle United	38	12	9	17	42	48	−6	45
14	Bournemouth	38	13	6	19	56	70	−14	45

Source: Premier League
Rules for classification: 1) Points; 2) Goal difference; 3) Goals scored; 4) Play-offs (only if needed to decide champion, teams for relegation or teams for UEFA competitions).

==== Results summary ====
Overall								Home						Away					
Pld	W	D	L	GF	GA	GD	Pts	W	D	L	GF	GA	GD	W	D	L	GF	GA	GD
38	14	7	17	51	53	−2	49	5	5	9	19	23	−4	9	2	8	32	30	+2

Last updated: 12 May 2019.

==== Results by matchday ====
Matchday	1	2	3	4	5	6	7	8	9	10	11	12	13	14	15	16	17	18	19	20	21	22	23	24	25	26	27	28	29	30	31	32	33	34	35	36	37	38
Ground	A	H	A	H	A	H	A	H	A	H	A	H	A	H	A	A	H	A	H	H	A	H	A	A	H	H	A	H	A	H	H	A	A	H	A	H	A	H
Result	W	L	L	L	W	D	L	L	L	D	L	L	D	W	L	L	W	W	D	L	W	L	L	D	W	D	W	L	W	L	W	L	W	L	W	D	W	W
Position	3	10	10	15	12	11	13	14	15	14	14	16	16	14	15	16	15	14	14	14	14	14	14	15	14	13	13	14	13	14	13	13	12	13	12	12	12	12

Updated to match(es) played on 12 May 2019. Source: Statto.com
A = Away; H = Home; W = Win; D = Draw; L = Loss

==== Matches ====
On 14 June 2018, the Premier League fixtures for the forthcoming season were announced.

11 August 2018 1	Fulham	0–2	Crystal Palace	Fulham
15:00 BST	McDonald (yellow card) 34'	Report	Schlupp 41' (yellow card) 74'; Zaha (yellow card) 40' (goal) 79'	Stadium: Craven Cottage; Attendance: 24,821 (2,900 away); Referee: Mike Dean

20 August 2018 2	Crystal Palace	0–2	Liverpool	Selhurst
20:00 BST	Patrick van Aanholt (yellow card) 42'; Wan-Bissaka (red card) 75'	Report	Milner 45' (pen.); Trent Alexander-Arnold (yellow card) 52'; Mané 90+3'	Stadium: Selhurst Park; Attendance: 25,750 (2,998 away); Referee: Michael Oliver

26 August 2018 3	Watford	2–1	Crystal Palace	Watford
13:30 BST	Étienne Capoue (yellow card) 4'; Daryl Janmaat (yellow card) 37'; Pereyra 53'; Holebas 71' (yellow card) 84'; Roberto Pereyra (yellow card) 86'	Report	Zaha (yellow card) 7' (goal) 78'; Max Meyer (yellow card) 80'	Stadium: Vicarage Road; Attendance: 20,014 (2,123 away); Referee: Anthony Taylor

1 September 2018 4	Crystal Palace	0–2	Southampton	Selhurst
15:00 BST	Wan-Bissaka (yellow card) 64'	Report	Ings 47'; Vestergaard (yellow card) 77'; Højbjerg 90+2'	Stadium: Selhurst Park; Attendance: 25,495 (2,797 away); Referee: Martin Atkinson

15 September 2018 5	Huddersfield Town	0–1	Crystal Palace	Huddersfield
15:00 BST	M. Jorgensen (yellow card) 27'	Report	McArthur (yellow card) 11'; Zaha (yellow card) 29', (goal) 38'	Stadium: John Smith's Stadium; Attendance: 23,696 (2,116 away); Referee: Lee Mason

22 September 2018 6	Crystal Palace	0–0	Newcastle United	Selhurst
15:00 BST	Tomkins (yellow card) 51'	Report	Yedlin (yellow card) 36'	Stadium: Selhurst Park; Attendance: 25,679 (2,967 away); Referee: Andre Marriner

1 October 2018 7	Bournemouth	2–1	Crystal Palace	Boscombe
20:00 BST	Brooks 5', (yellow card) 29'; Stanislas 87' (pen.); Lerma (yellow card) 90'	Report	van Aanholt 55'; Townsend (yellow card) 76'; Sakho (yellow card) 86'; Kouyaté (yellow card) 90'; Tomkins (yellow card) 90'	Stadium: Dean Court; Attendance: 10,199 (1,319 away); Referee: Mike Dean

6 October 2018 8	Crystal Palace	0–1	Wolverhampton Wanderers	Selhurst
15:00 BST	McArthur (yellow card) 30'; Kouyaté (yellow card) 88' van Aanholt (yellow card) 90'	Report	Doherty 56'; Coady (yellow card) 78'; Jonny (yellow card) 88'; Moutinho (yellow card) 90'; Cavaleiro (yellow card) 90'	Stadium: Selhurst Park; Attendance: 25,715 (3,027 away); Referee: Michael Oliver

21 October 2018 9	Everton	2–0	Crystal Palace	Walton
16:00 BST	Calvert-Lewin 87'; Tosun 89'	Report		Stadium: Goodison Park; Attendance: 38,668 (957 away); Referee: Anthony Taylor

28 October 2018 10	Crystal Palace	2–2	Arsenal	Selhurst
13:30 GMT	Ayew (yellow card) 8'; Milivojević 45+1' (pen.), 83' (pen.)	Report	Xhaka 51'; Aubameyang 56'; Lichtsteiner (yellow card) 79'; Guendouzi (yellow card) 90+4'	Stadium: Selhurst Park; Attendance: 25,718 (2,998 away); Referee: Martin Atkinson

4 November 2018 11	Chelsea	3–1	Crystal Palace	London
16:00 GMT	Morata 32', 65'; Pedro 70'	Report	Townsend 53'; Milivojević (yellow card) 86'	Stadium: Stamford Bridge; Attendance: 40,407 (2,928 away); Referee: Michael Oliver

10 November 2018 12	Crystal Palace	0–1	Tottenham Hotspur	Selhurst
17:30 GMT		Report	Foyth 66'	Stadium: Selhurst Park; Attendance: 25,685 (2,998 away); Referee: Jonathan Moss

24 November 2018 13	Manchester United	0–0	Crystal Palace	Manchester
15:00 GMT	Young (yellow card) 71'	Report	Milivojević (yellow card) 9'; Sakho (yellow card) 27'	Stadium: Old Trafford; Attendance: 74,516; Referee: Lee Mason

1 December 2018 14	Crystal Palace	2–0	Burnley	Selhurst
15:00 GMT	McArthur 16'; Townsend 77'; Meyer (yellow card) 84'	Report	Mee (yellow card) 42'	Stadium: Selhurst Park; Attendance: 25,098; Referee: Lee Probert

4 December 2018 15	Brighton & Hove Albion	3–1	Crystal Palace	Falmer
19:45 GMT	Murray 24' (pen.); Duffy (red card) 28'; Balogun 31'; Andone 45+4'	Report	Milivojević 81' (pen.)	Stadium: Falmer Stadium; Referee: Kevin Friend

8 December 2018 16	West Ham United	3–2	Crystal Palace	Stratford, London
15:00 GMT	Diop (yellow card) 38'; Snodgrass 48'; Hernández 62'; Anderson 65'	Report	McArthur 6'; Schlupp 76'; Zaha (yellow card) 90+1'; Tomkins (yellow card) 90+5'	Stadium: Olympic Stadium; Attendance: 56,995; Referee: Anthony Taylor

15 December 2018 17	Crystal Palace	1–0	Leicester City	Selhurst
15:00 GMT	Milivojević 39'; McArthur (yellow card) 45+1'; Guaita (yellow card) 90'	Report	Pereira (yellow card) 61'	Stadium: Selhurst Park; Attendance: 24,738; Referee: Michael Oliver

22 December 2018 18	Manchester City	2–3	Crystal Palace	Manchester
15:00 GMT	Gündoğan 27'; De Bruyne 85'	Report	Schlupp 33'; Townsend 35'; Milivojević 52' (pen.)	Stadium: City of Manchester Stadium; Attendance: 54,340; Referee: Andre Marriner

26 December 2018 19	Crystal Palace	0–0	Cardiff City	Selhurst
15:00 GMT		Report	Bamba (yellow card) 31'; Hoilett (yellow card) 45+1'; Camarasa (yellow card) 77'	Stadium: Selhurst Park; Attendance: 25,206; Referee: Lee Probert

30 December 2018 20	Crystal Palace	0–1	Chelsea	Selhurst
12:00 GMT		Report	Alonso (yellow card) 10'; Kanté 51'	Stadium: Selhurst Park; Attendance: 25,781; Referee: Craig Pawson

2 January 2019 21	Wolverhampton Wanderers	0–2	Crystal Palace	Wolverhampton
19:45 GMT	Boly (yellow card) 23'; Saïss (yellow card) 45+1'; Bennett (yellow card) 54'; Jonny (yellow card) 90+1'	Report	Milivojević (yellow card) 62' (goal) 90+5' (pen.); Ayew 83'	Stadium: Molineux Stadium; Attendance: 30,666; Referee: Roger East

12 January 2019 22	Crystal Palace	1–2	Watford	Selhurst
15:00 GMT	Cathcart 38' (o.g.); Milivojević (yellow card) 84'	Report	Femenía (yellow card) 61'; Sema (yellow card) 65'; Cathcart 67'; Cleverley 74', (yellow card) 90+4'; Pereyra (yellow card) 90+1'	Stadium: Selhurst Park; Attendance: 25,010; Referee: Paul Tierney

19 January 2019 23	Liverpool	4–3	Crystal Palace	Liverpool
15:00 GMT	Salah 46', 75'; Firmino 53'; Milner (yellow card) 82' (yellow-red card) 89'; Mané 90+3'	Report	Townsend 34'; J. Ayew (yellow card) 42'; Tomkins 65'; Meyer 90+5'	Stadium: Anfield; Attendance: 53,171; Referee: Jonathan Moss

30 January 2019 24	Southampton	1–1	Crystal Palace	Southampton
19:45 GMT	Højbjerg (yellow card) 37'; Bednarek (yellow card) 59'; Ward-Prowse 77'	Report	Milivojević (yellow card) 35'; Zaha 41' (yellow card) 87' (yellow-red card) 87'; Wan-Bissaka (yellow card) 47'	Stadium: St Mary's Stadium; Attendance: 28,339; Referee: Andre Marriner

2 February 2019 25	Crystal Palace	2–0	Fulham	Selhurst
15:00 GMT	J. Ayew (yellow card) 6'; Milivojević 25' (pen.); Wan-Bissaka (yellow card) 76'; Schlupp 87'	Report	Le Marchand (yellow card) 27'; Odoi (yellow card) 45'; Babel (yellow card) 59'	Stadium: Selhurst Park; Attendance: 25,355; Referee: Michael Oliver

9 February 2019 26	Crystal Palace	1–1	West Ham United	Selhurst
15:00 GMT	Wan-Bissaka (yellow card) 35'; Milivojević (yellow card) 43'; McArthur (yellow card) 45+1'; Zaha 76'	Report	Noble 27' (pen.)	Stadium: Selhurst Park; Attendance: 25,552; Referee: Craig Pawson

23 February 2019 27	Leicester City	1–4	Crystal Palace	Leicester
17:30 GMT	Ndidi (yellow card) 36'; Evans 63'; Schmeichel (yellow card) 81'	Report	Batshuayi 40'; McArthur (yellow card) 51'; Zaha 70', 90+3'; Milivojević 81' (pen.)	Stadium: King Power Stadium; Attendance: 31,778; Referee: Anthony Taylor

27 February 2019 28	Crystal Palace	1–3	Manchester United	Selhurst
20:00 GMT	Kelly (yellow card) 41'; Ward 66'; Zaha (yellow card) 90+1'	Report	Lukaku 33', 52' (yellow card) 90+5'; Sánchez (yellow card) 69'; Shaw (yellow card) 81'; Young 83'	Stadium: Selhurst Park; Attendance: 25,754; Referee: Martin Atkinson

2 March 2019 29	Burnley	1–3	Crystal Palace	Burnley
15:00 GMT	Mee (yellow card) 38'; Barnes 90'	Report	Bardsley 15' (o.g.); Batshuayi 48'; Tomkins (yellow card) 65'; Meyer (yellow card) 69'; Zaha 76'	Stadium: Turf Moor; Attendance: 19,223; Referee: Lee Probert

9 March 2019 30	Crystal Palace	1–2	Brighton & Hove Albion	Selhurst
12:30 GMT	Milivojević 50' (pen.); Dann (yellow card) 89'	Report	Knockaert (yellow card) 1' (goal) 74'; Murray 19' (yellow card) 70'; Montoya (yellow card) 24'; Ryan (yellow card) 90+2'; Bernardo (yellow card) 90+3'	Stadium: Selhurst Park; Attendance: 24,972; Referee: Craig Pawson

30 March 2019 31	Crystal Palace	2–0	Huddersfield Town	Selhurst
15:00 GMT	Milivojević 76' (pen.); van Aanholt 88'	Report		Stadium: Selhurst Park; Attendance: 25,193; Referee: Lee Probert

3 April 2019 32	Tottenham Hotspur	2–0	Crystal Palace	Tottenham
19:45 BST	Alli (yellow card) 29'; Son Heung-min 55'; Eriksen 80'	Report		Stadium: Tottenham Hotspur Stadium; Attendance: 59,215; Referee: Andre Marriner

6 April 2019 33	Newcastle United	0–1	Crystal Palace	Newcastle upon Tyne
15:00 BST	Hayden (yellow card) 79'	Report	Kelly (yellow card) 45+2'; Milivojević 81' (pen.); Benteke (yellow card) 90+4'	Stadium: St James' Park; Attendance: 51,926; Referee: Stuart Attwell

14 April 2019 34	Crystal Palace	1–3	Manchester City	Selhurst
14:05 BST	Milivojević 81'	Report	Sterling 15', 63'; Jesus 90'	Stadium: Selhurst Park; Attendance: 25,721; Referee: Martin Atkinson

21 April 2019 35	Arsenal	2–3	Crystal Palace	Holloway
16:00 BST	Mavropanos (yellow card) 16'; Özil 47', (yellow card) 63'; Guendouzi (yellow card) 68'; Aubameyang 77'; Mustafi (yellow card) 85'	Report	Benteke 17'; Zaha 61'; McArthur 69'; Ward (yellow card) 81'	Stadium: Emirates Stadium; Attendance: 59,929; Referee: Jonathan Moss

27 April 2019 36	Crystal Palace	0–0	Everton	Selhurst
15:00 BST	Milivojević (yellow card) 10'; Kouyaté (yellow card) 74'	Report		Stadium: Selhurst Park; Attendance: 25,789; Referee: Lee Mason

4 May 2019 37	Cardiff City	2–3	Crystal Palace	Cardiff
17:30 BST	Kelly 31' (o.g.); Reid 90'	Report	Zaha 28'; Batshuayi 39'; Townsend 70'	Stadium: Cardiff City Stadium; Attendance: 32,133; Referee: Michael Oliver

12 May 2019 38	Crystal Palace	5–3	Bournemouth	Selhurst
15:00 BST	Batshuayi 24', 32'; Simpson 37' (o.g.); Milivojević (yellow card) 63'; van Aanholt 65'; McArthur (yellow card) 69'; Zaha (yellow card) 79'; Townsend 80'	Report	Lerma 45'; Ibe 56'; King 73'	Stadium: Selhurst Park; Attendance: 25,433; Referee: Roger East

=== FA Cup ===
In the third round draw, made on 3 December 2018, Palace were drawn at home to League Two team Grimsby Town. They won through a late Jordan Ayew goal after Grimsby had a man sent off, and in the draw for the next round were paired with fellow Premier League team Tottenham Hotspur. Palace won 2–0 against Spurs, earning an away tie against League One team Doncaster Rovers in the fifth round. The draw for the quarter-final was made on 18 February.

5 January 2019 Third round	Crystal Palace	1–0	Grimsby Town	Selhurst
17:30 GMT	Ayew 86'	Report	Fox (red card) 2'; Hendrie (yellow card) 45+1'; Rose (yellow card) 74'	Stadium: Selhurst Park; Attendance: 19,967; Referee: Martin Atkinson

27 January 2019 Fourth round	Crystal Palace	2–0	Tottenham Hotspur	Selhurst
16:00 GMT	Wickham 9'; Townsend 34' (pen.)	Report		Stadium: Selhurst Park; Attendance: 19,491; Referee: Kevin Friend

17 February 2019 Fifth round	Doncaster Rovers	0–2	Crystal Palace	Doncaster
16:00	Whiteman (yellow card) 81'	Report	Schlupp 8'; Meyer 45+2'	Stadium: Keepmoat Stadium; Attendance: 14,010; Referee: Mike Dean

16 March 2019 Quarter-finals	Watford	2–1	Crystal Palace	Watford
12:15 GMT	Capoue 27'; Gray 79'	Report	Batshuayi 62'	Stadium: Vicarage Road; Attendance: 18,104; Referee: Kevin Friend

=== EFL Cup ===
Crystal Palace entered the competition in the second round, where they were drawn against Swansea City. The third round draw was made on 30 August 2018, where Palace were drawn to play away against West Brom. The fourth round draw was on 29 September with Crystal Palace again drawn away, this time to Middlesbrough. Palace lost the game to a goal in first-half injury time.

28 August 2018 Second round	Swansea City	0–1	Crystal Palace	Swansea
19:30 BST		Report	Sørloth 70'	Stadium: Liberty Stadium; Attendance: 9,122; Referee: John Brooks

25 September 2018 Third round	West Bromwich Albion	0–3	Crystal Palace	West Bromwich
20:00 BST	Hegazi (yellow card) 49'	Report	Townsend 6', 81'; van Aanholt 76'; Puncheon (yellow card) 67'	Stadium: The Hawthorns; Attendance: 10,818; Referee: Peter Bankes

31 October 2018 Fourth round	Middlesbrough	1–0	Crystal Palace	Middlesbrough
20:00 GMT	Wing 45+3'	Report		Stadium: Riverside Stadium; Attendance: 11,850; Referee: Paul Tierney

== Player statistics ==
=== Appearances and goals ===
As of 12 May 2019

No.	Pos	Nat	Player	Total		Premier League		FA Cup		League Cup	
No.	Pos	Nat	Player	Apps	Goals	Apps	Goals	Apps	Goals	Apps	Goals
Goalkeepers
1	GK	(Argentina) ARG	Julián Speroni	2	0	1	0	1	0	0	0
13	GK	(Wales) WAL	Wayne Hennessey	20	0	17+1	0	2	0	0	0
31	GK	(Spain) ESP	Vicente Guaita	23	0	20	0	0	0	3	0
Defenders
2	DF	(England) ENG	Joel Ward	12	1	6+1	1	3	0	1+1	0
3	DF	(Netherlands) NED	Patrick van Aanholt	39	4	36	3	2	0	1	1
5	DF	(England) ENG	James Tomkins	29	1	29	1	0	0	0	0
6	DF	(England) ENG	Scott Dann	13	0	7+3	0	3	0	0	0
12	DF	(France) FRA	Mamadou Sakho	27	0	27	0	0	0	0	0
27	DF	(Senegal) SEN	Pape Souaré	4	0	0+1	0	1	0	1+1	0
29	DF	(England) ENG	Aaron Wan-Bissaka	38	0	35	0	0	0	2+1	0
33	DF	(England) ENG	Ryan Inniss	1	0	0	0	0	0	1	0
34	DF	(England) ENG	Martin Kelly	19	0	12+1	0	3	0	3	0
35	DF	(England) ENG	Sam Woods	1	0	0	0	0	0	0+1	0
Midfielders
4	MF	(Serbia) SRB	Luka Milivojević	41	12	38	12	1+1	0	0+1	0
7	MF	(Germany) GER	Max Meyer	35	2	15+14	1	3	1	3	0
8	MF	(Senegal) SEN	Cheikhou Kouyaté	36	0	21+10	0	1+2	0	2	0
10	MF	(England) ENG	Andros Townsend	44	9	34+4	6	3	1	2+1	2
15	MF	(Ghana) GHA	Jeffrey Schlupp	36	5	18+12	4	3	1	3	0
18	MF	(Scotland) SCO	James McArthur	39	3	36+2	3	0+1	0	0	0
26	MF	(Mali) MLI	Bakary Sako	4	0	0+4	0	0	0	0	0
28	MF	(England) ENG	Luke Dreher	1	0	0+1	0	0	0	0	0
44	MF	(Netherlands) NED	Jaïro Riedewald	4	0	0	0	1	0	3	0
Forwards
9	FW	(Norway) NOR	Alexander Sørloth	16	1	0+12	0	1	0	3	1
11	FW	(Ivory Coast) CIV	Wilfried Zaha	36	10	34	10	2	0	0	0
14	FW	(Ghana) GHA	Jordan Ayew	25	2	14+6	1	1+2	1	1+1	0
17	FW	(Belgium) BEL	Christian Benteke	17	1	8+7	1	0+2	0	0	0
21	FW	(England) ENG	Connor Wickham	8	1	0+6	0	1+1	1	0	0
23	FW	(Belgium) BEL	Michy Batshuayi	12	6	9+2	5	1	1	0	0
Left club during season
20	MF	(Wales) WAL	Jonny Williams	1	0	0	0	0	0	1	0
25	MF	(England) ENG	Sullay Kaikai	2	0	0	0	0	0	0+2	0
42	MF	(England) ENG	Jason Puncheon	8	0	0+5	0	0	0	3	0

=== Goalscorers ===
As of 12 May 2019

No.	Pos.	Name	Premier League	FA Cup	League Cup	Total
4	MF	Luka Milivojević	12	0	0	12
11	FW	Wilfried Zaha	10	0	0	10
10	MF	Andros Townsend	6	1	2	9
23	FW	Michy Batshuayi	5	1	0	6
15	MF	Jeffrey Schlupp	4	1	0	5
3	DF	Patrick van Aanholt	3	0	1	4
18	MF	James McArthur	3	0	0	3
7	MF	Max Meyer	1	1	0	2
14	FW	Jordan Ayew	1	1	0	2
5	DF	James Tomkins	1	0	0	1
2	DF	Joel Ward	1	0	0	1
17	FW	Christian Benteke	1	0	0	1
9	FW	Alexander Sørloth	0	0	1	1
21	FW	Connor Wickham	0	1	0	1
—		Own goal	3	0	0	3
Total			51	6	4	61

=== Disciplinary record ===
As of 12 May 2019

No.	Pos.	Name	Premier League		FA Cup		League Cup		Total	
No.	Pos.	Name	Booked	Sent off (straight red)	Booked	Sent off (straight red)	Booked	Sent off (straight red)	Booked	Sent off (straight red)
4	MF	Luka Milivojević	10	0	1	0	0	0	11	0
11	FW	Wilfried Zaha	8	1	1	0	0	0	9	1
18	MF	James McArthur	7	0	0	0	0	0	7	0
5	DF	James Tomkins	6	0	0	0	0	0	6	0
29	DF	Aaron Wan-Bissaka	4	1	0	0	0	0	4	1
3	DF	Patrick van Aanholt	3	0	0	0	0	0	3	0
14	FW	Jordan Ayew	3	0	0	0	0	0	3	0
7	MF	Max Meyer	3	0	0	0	0	0	3	0
8	MF	Cheikhou Kouyaté	3	0	0	0	0	0	3	0
12	DF	Mamadou Sakho	2	0	0	0	0	0	2	0
31	GK	Vicente Guaita	2	0	0	0	0	0	2	0
17	FW	Christian Benteke	1	0	1	0	0	0	2	0
34	DF	Martin Kelly	2	0	0	0	0	0	2	0
15	MF	Jeffrey Schlupp	1	0	0	0	0	0	1	0
42	MF	Jason Puncheon	0	0	0	0	1	0	1	0
10	MF	Andros Townsend	1	0	0	0	0	0	1	0
6	DF	Scott Dann	1	0	0	0	0	0	1	0
2	DF	Joel Ward	1	0	0	0	0	0	1	0
Total			58	2	3	0	1	0	62	2

== Transfers ==
=== Transfers in ===
Date	Position	Nationality	Name	From	Fee	Ref.
1 July 2018	GK	(Spain)	Vicente Guaita	(Spain) Getafe	Free transfer	
1 August 2018	DM	(Senegal)	Cheikhou Kouyaté	West Ham United	£9,500,000	
2 August 2018	CM	(Germany)	Max Meyer	(Germany) Schalke 04	Free transfer	
27 January 2019	LW	(Mali)	Bakary Sako	West Bromwich Albion	Free transfer	
14 March 2019	CB	(England)	Jacob Mensah	Ramsgate	Free transfer	

=== Loans in ===
Start date	Position	Nationality	Name	From	End date	Ref.
9 August 2018	CF	(Ghana)	Jordan Ayew	(Wales) Swansea City	End of season	
24 January 2019	GK	(Brazil)	Lucas Perri	(Brazil) São Paulo	End of season	
31 January 2019	CF	(Belgium)	Michy Batshuayi	Chelsea	End of season	

=== Transfers out ===
Date from	Position	Nationality	Name	To	Fee	Ref.
1 July 2018	CM	(France)	Yohan Cabaye	(United Arab Emirates) Al-Nasr SC	Released	
1 July 2018	GK	(Brazil)	Diego Cavalieri	Free agent	Released	
1 July 2018	CF	(England)	Andre Coker	Maidstone United	Free transfer	
1 July 2018	CB	(Republic of Ireland)	Damien Delaney	(Republic of Ireland) Cork City	Released	
1 July 2018	RW	(South Korea)	Lee Chung-yong	(Germany) VfL Bochum	Released	
1 July 2018	LW	(Mali)	Bakary Sako	West Bromwich Albion	Released	
1 August 2018	LB	(England)	Jacob Berkeley-Agyepong	Aldershot Town	Free transfer	
3 August 2018	GK	(England)	Matt Funnell	Maidstone United	Free transfer	
4 January 2019	MF	(Wales)	Jonny Williams	Charlton Athletic	Undisclosed	
4 January 2019	MF	(England)	Jordon Mutch	(South Korea) Gyeongnam	Released	
21 January 2019	LW	(England)	Sullay Kaikai	(Netherlands) NAC Breda	Undisclosed	

=== Loans out ===
Start date	Position	Nationality	Name	To	End date	Ref.
24 July 2018	CB	(Poland)	Jarosław Jach	(Turkey) Çaykur Rizespor	End of season	
29 August 2018	RW	(Belgium)	Jason Lokilo	(France) Lorient	End of season	
31 August 2018	LB	(England)	Tyler Brown	Kingstonian	End of season	
31 August 2018	CF	(England)	James Daly	Kingstonian	End of season	
31 August 2018	CB	(England)	Ryan Inniss	(Scotland) Dundee	31 January 2019	
31 August 2018	MF	(England)	Levi Lumeka	Leyton Orient	9 January 2019	
4 January 2019	MF	(England)	Jason Puncheon	Huddersfield Town	End of season	
8 January 2019	CF	(Norway)	Alexander Sørloth	(Belgium) Gent	End of season	
11 January 2019	AM	(England)	Nya Kirby	Blackpool	End of season	
18 January 2019	MF	(England)	Joseph Hungbo	Margate	End of season	
25 January 2019	GK	(Northern Ireland)	Oliver Webber	Greenwich Borough	End of season	
31 January 2019	GK	(England)	Dion-Curtis Henry	Maidstone United	End of season	
2 February 2019	CB	(Poland)	Jarosław Jach	(Moldova) Sheriff Tiraspol	29 August 2019	
