= Jerome Opoku =

Ghanaian footballer (born 1998)

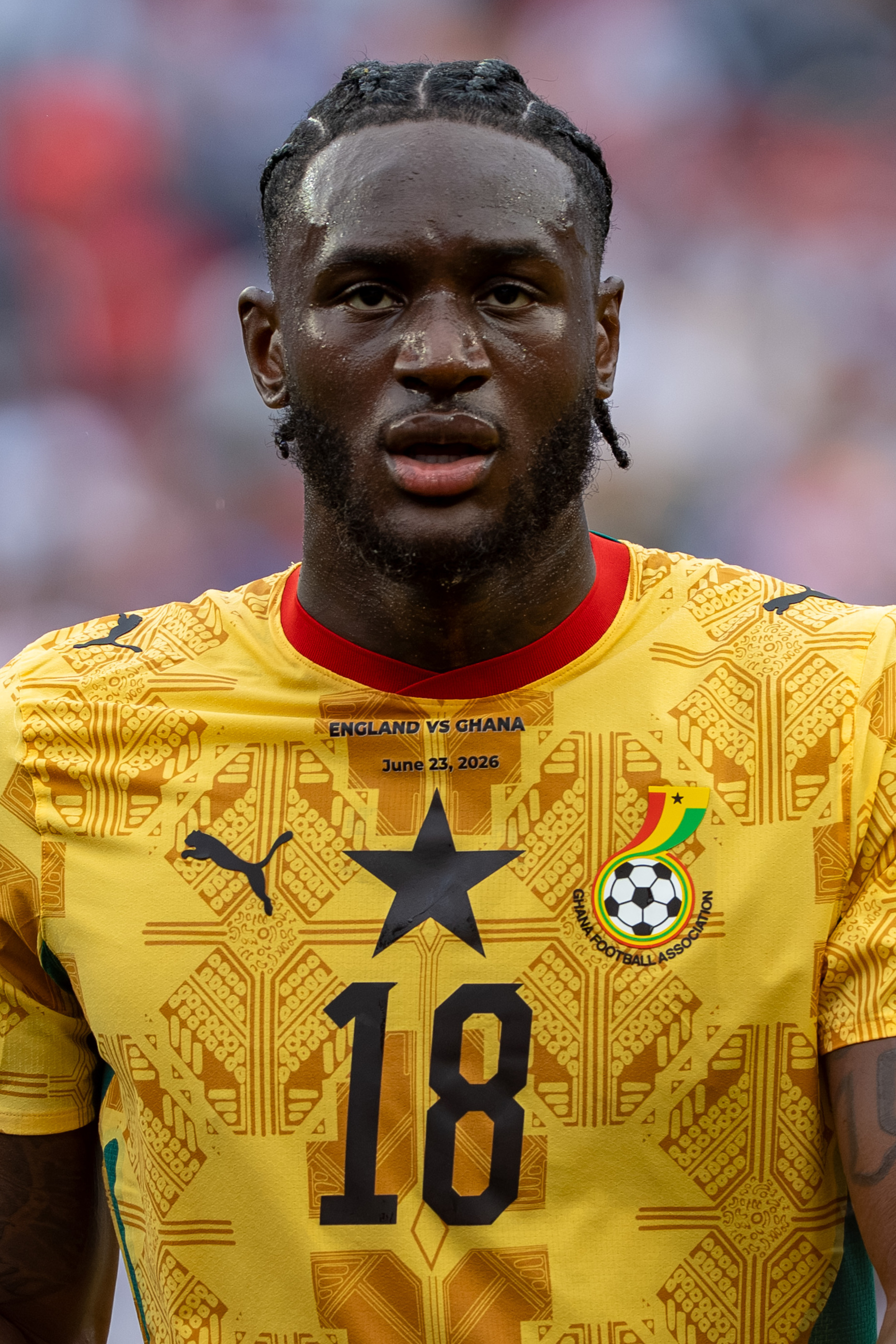
- Opoku with Ghana in 2026

Personal information
- Full name: Jerome Osei Opoku
- Date of birth: 14 October 1998 (age 28)
- Place of birth: Lambeth, England
- Height: 1.97 m (6 ft 5 1/2 in)
- Position: Centre-back

Team information
- Current team: İstanbul Başakşehir
- Number: 3

Youth career
- 2009–2019: Fulham

Senior career*
Years	Team	Apps	(Gls)
2019–2022	Fulham	0	(0)
2019–2020	→ Accrington Stanley (loan)	21	(0)
2020–2021	→ Plymouth Argyle (loan)	33	(1)
2021–2022	→ Vejle (loan)	20	(0)
2022–2024	Arouca	26	(0)
2023–2024	→ İstanbul Başakşehir (loan)	28	(4)
2024–	İstanbul Başakşehir	70	(3)

International career^{‡}
2023–	Ghana	16	(1)
- * Club domestic league appearances and goals as of 29 September 2026 ‡ National team caps and goals as of 4 July 2026

Jerome Osei Opoku (born 14 October 1998) is a professional footballer. He plays as a centre-back for Süper Lig club İstanbul Başakşehir. Born in England, he plays for the Ghana national team.

Opoku grew up admiring Gareth Bale and initially aspired to become a top-class winger. However, during his U-15 years, his coach Mark Pembridge shifted him to left-back. Around the same time, a sudden growth spurt prompted another change — this time to centre-back — a position he would go on to play for most of his senior career.

As captain of Fulham's U-16 team, Opoku led the side to victory in the 2014 Premier League International Cup, defeating a highly rated Chelsea squad in the final.

== Club career ==
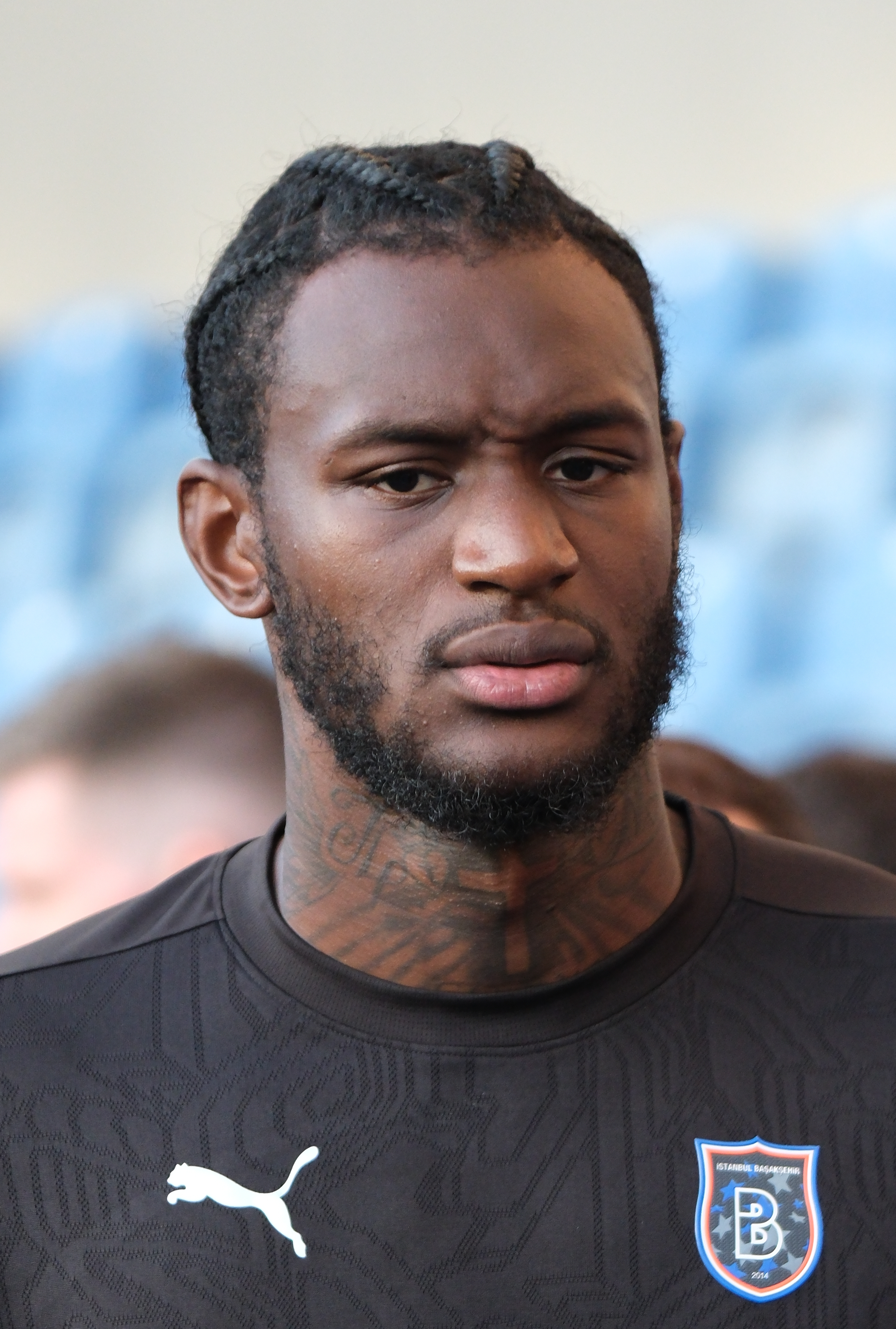
Opoku with İstanbul Başakşehir in 2025

He captained the Fulham U23s at the end of the 2018–19 season.

On 2 September 2019, Opoku was sent on loan to League One side Accrington Stanley in order to gain first team experience. He made his Accrington debut against Bristol Rovers on 7 September 2019 in an eventual 3–3 draw. After a 3–1 defeat to Sunderland, in an interview he claimed he would play anywhere the coach put him.

On 25 September 2020, Opoku joined League One side Plymouth Argyle on loan until January.

On 30 July 2021, Opoku was loaned out again, this time to Danish Superliga club Vejle Boldklub, for the entire 2021–22 season.

On 24 June 2022, Opoku joined Portuguese Primeira Liga side Arouca on a free transfer, signing a three-year contract.

On 14 September 2023, Opoku signed a one-year contract extension with Arouca, until 2026, and was immediately sent on a season-long loan to Süper Lig side İstanbul Başakşehir.

== International career ==
Born in England, Opoku is of Ghanaian descent. On 18 October 2023, he debuted for the Ghana national team in a friendly loss to the United States national team.

On June 2, 2026, Opoku was integrated by Ghana's coach Carlos Queiroz into his list of 26 players in order to compete in the 2026 FIFA World Cup.

== Career statistics ==
=== Club ===
As of match played 13 September 2026

Appearances and goals by club, season and competition
Club	Season	League			National cup		League cup		Continental		Other		Total	
Club	Season	Division	Apps	Goals	Apps	Goals	Apps	Goals	Apps	Goals	Apps	Goals	Apps	Goals
Fulham U21	2017–18	Premier League 2	—		—		—		—		1 (Note: Appearance(s) in EFL Trophy)	0	1	0
Fulham U21	2018–19	Premier League 2	—		—		—		—		2 (Note: Appearances in the EFL Trophy)	0	2	0
Fulham U21	Total		—		—		—		—		3	0	3	0
Accrington Stanley (loan)	2019–20	League One	21	0	1	0	0	0	—		3	0	25	0
Plymouth Argyle (loan)	2020–21	League One	33	1	4	0	0	0	—		1	0	38	1
Vejle Boldklub (loan)	2021–22	Danish Superliga	20	0	6	0	—		—		—		26	0
Arouca	2022–23	Primeira Liga	24	0	2	0	3	1	—		—		29	1
Arouca	2023–24	Primeira Liga	2	0	—		0	0	2 (Note: Appearance(s) in UEFA Europa Conference League)	0	—		4	0
Arouca	Total		26	0	2	0	3	1	2	0	—		33	1
İstanbul Başakşehir (loan)	2023–24	Süper Lig	28	4	4	0	—		—		—		32	4
İstanbul Başakşehir	2024–25	Süper Lig	33	3	3	0	—		11	0	—		47	3
İstanbul Başakşehir	2025–26	Süper Lig	32	0	2	1	—		2	0	—		36	1
İstanbul Başakşehir	2026–27	Süper Lig	5	0	0	0	—		1	0	—		6	0
İstanbul Başakşehir	Total		98	7	9	1	—		14	0	—		121	8
Total			198	8	22	1	3	1	16	0	7	0	246	10

=== International ===
As of match played 29 September 2026

Appearances and goals by national team and year
National team	Year	Apps	Goals
Ghana	2023	1	0
Ghana	2024	2	1
Ghana	2025	6	0
Ghana	2026	7	0
Total		16	1

Scores and results list Ghana's goal tally first, score column indicates score after each Opoku goal.

List of international goals scored by Jerome Opoku
No.	Date	Venue	Opponent	Score	Result	Competition	Ref.
1	26 March 2024	Marrakesh Stadium, Marrakesh, Morocco	Uganda	1–0	2–2	Friendly	
