= Tezel =

Tezel (IPA: [teˈzel], literally "swift-handed") is a Turkish surname formed by the combination of the Turkish words tez ("quick, prompt, nimble") and el ("hand"). Notable people with the surname include:

- Aylin Tezel (born 1983), German actress
- Ayşe Tezel (born 1980), Turkish British actress
- Tunç Tezel (born 1977), Turkish amateur astronomer and photographer
- Uğur Tezel (born 1997), Turkish-German footballer

== See also ==
- Tetzel
