= Ryan Law =

English footballer (born 1999)

Personal information
- Full name: Ryan James Law
- Date of birth: 8 September 1999 (age 27)
- Place of birth: Kingsteignton, England
- Position: Left back

Team information
- Current team: Truro City

Youth career
- 2008–2018: Plymouth Argyle

Senior career*
Years	Team	Apps	(Gls)
2018–2023	Plymouth Argyle	18	(1)
2019	→ Gloucester City (loan)	2	(0)
2019–2020	→ Truro City (loan)	27	(3)
2020	→ Chippenham Town (loan)	2	(0)
2021	→ Torquay United (loan)	8	(0)
2022–2023	→ Gillingham (loan)	17	(0)
2023	→ Yeovil Town (loan)	11	(1)
2023–	Truro City	108	(4)
- * Club domestic league appearances and goals as of 08:36, 4 April 2026 (UTC)

Ryan James Law (born 8 September 1999) is an English professional footballer who plays as a left back for Truro City.

== Career ==
=== Plymouth Argyle ===
Whilst he was an academy player, Law featured on the bench for Argyle in a 5–2 EFL League One defeat to Gillingham on 5 May 2018, but did not come on.

Law made his professional debut on 13 November 2018 in an EFL Trophy match between Argyle and EFL League Two side Newport County, where he started at left-back. Newport won the game 2–0. He moved on loan to Gloucester City in early 2019.

==== Loan Spells ====
On 19 July 2019 Law joined Truro City of the Southern League Premier South on a 28-day loan. The loan deal was then extended until 18 January 2020. On 19 January 2020 it was confirmed, that the deal had been extended once again, this time for the rest of the season. Due to the COVID-19 pandemic, the league season was cut short and declared null and void with Truro sitting top of the league at the time.

On 15 March 2021, Law joined National League side Torquay United on a one-month loan deal. He returned to Plymouth on 15 April 2021 helping the club to six victories in the eight matches he played, his last appearance coming in a vital top of the table 1–0 victory over Sutton United.

==== Return to Plymouth ====
Law scored a first senior goal for the club in a 3–0 victory over Sheffield Wednesday, sealing the victory in the seventh minute of added time having only been brought on as a substitute two minutes prior. Law signed a new one-year contract extension with Plymouth on 6 May 2022.

==== Gillingham loan ====
On 18 July 2022, Law joined League Two club Gillingham on a season-long loan deal. On 9 January 2023, Plymouth Argyle recalled Law from his loan early.

==== Yeovil Town loan ====
On 10 February 2023, Law joined National League side Yeovil Town on loan until the end of the season.

Following promotion to the Championship, Law was released by Plymouth at the end of the 2022–23 season.

==== Truro City ====
On 26 July 2023, Law signed for National League South club Truro City.

== Career statistics ==
As of match played 3 April 2026

Appearances and goals by club, season and competition
Club	Season	League			FA Cup		EFL Cup		Other		Total	
Club	Season	Division	Apps	Goals	Apps	Goals	Apps	Goals	Apps	Goals	Apps	Goals
Plymouth Argyle	2017–18	League One	0	0	0	0	0	0	0	0	0	0
Plymouth Argyle	2018–19	League One	0	0	0	0	0	0	1 (Note: Appearance(s) in EFL Trophy)	0	1	0
Plymouth Argyle	2019–20	League Two	0	0	0	0	0	0	0	0	0	0
Plymouth Argyle	2020–21	League One	4	0	0	0	1	0	3	0	8	0
Plymouth Argyle	2021–22	League One	14	1	3	1	2	0	3	0	22	2
Plymouth Argyle	2022–23	League One	0	0	0	0	0	0	0	0	0	0
Plymouth Argyle	Total		18	1	3	1	3	0	7	0	31	2
Gloucester City (loan)	2018–19	National League South	2	0	—		—		—		2	0
Truro City (loan)	2019–20	Southern League; Premier Division South	27	3	2	1	—		1 (Note: Appearance in Southern League Cup)	0	30	4
Chippenham Town (loan)	2020–21	National League South	2	0	—		—		1 (Note: Appearance in FA Trophy)	0	3	0
Torquay United (loan)	2020–21	National League	8	0	—		—		—		8	0
Gillingham (loan)	2022–23	League Two	17	0	2	0	2	0	3	0	24	0
Yeovil Town (loan)	2022–23	National League	11	1	—		—		—		11	1
Truro City	2023–24	National League South	40	2	1	0	—		1	0	42	2
Truro City	2024–25	National League South	35	1	1	0	—		1	0	37	1
Truro City	2025–26	National League	33	1	1	0	—		5 (Note: One appearance in FA Trophy, four appearances in National League Cup)	0	39	1
Truro City	Total		108	4	3	0	—		7	0	118	4
Career total			193	9	10	1	5	0	19	0	227	10
