= Sam Woods (footballer) =

English footballer (born 1998)

Personal information
- Full name: Samuel John Woods
- Date of birth: 11 September 1998 (age 28)
- Place of birth: Bromley, England
- Position: Midfielder

Team information
- Current team: AFC Croydon Athletic

Youth career
- Crystal Palace

Senior career*
Years	Team	Apps	(Gls)
2018–2021	Crystal Palace	5	(0)
2020	→ Hamilton Academical (loan)	3	(1)
2021	→ Plymouth Argyle (loan)	9	(1)
2021–2023	Barnet	40	(1)
2022	→ Cheshunt (loan)	3	(0)
2023–2024	Bromley	22	(3)
2024–	AFC Croydon Athletic	10	(0)
- * Club domestic league appearances and goals as of 11:47, 20 August 2025 (UTC)

Samuel John Woods (born 11 September 1998) is an English professional footballer who plays as a midfielder for AFC Croydon Athletic.

== Early life ==
Woods was born on 11 September 1998 and supported Crystal Palace as a child.

== Career ==
Woods began his youth career with Crystal Palace and worked his way through the club's academy programme. He made his senior debut on 31 October 2018 as a 78th-minute substitute for Pape Souaré in an away 0–1 defeat to Middlesbrough in a fourth round EFL Cup tie. He made his first senior start on 27 August 2019 in a home 0–0 draw in the same competition against Colchester United, which Palace lost after a penalty shoot-out.

In October 2019, Woods signed a contract extension until June 2021.

On 22 January 2020, Woods signed on loan with Hamilton Academical until the end of the 2019–20 season. He scored on his debut, on 25 January, in a 4–2 loss at home to Livingston.

On 31 January 2021, Woods signed on loan with Plymouth Argyle until the end of the 2020–21 season. Woods contract expired and he left Crystal Palace, after the 2020–21 season.

In October 2021, Woods signed for EFL League Two club Barnet. He joined Cheshunt on loan in September 2022.

Woods joined Bromley for the 2023-24 season. Having helped the club to promotion, he had his contract terminated by mutual consent in September 2024.

In November 2024, he joined Isthmian League club AFC Croydon Athletic.

== Career statistics ==
As of match played 7 April 2023

Appearances and goals by club, season and competition
Club	Season	League			FA Cup		League Cup		Other		Total	
Club	Season	Division	Apps	Goals	Apps	Goals	Apps	Goals	Apps	Goals	Apps	Goals
Crystal Palace	2018–19	Premier League	0	0	0	0	1	0	0	0	1	0
Crystal Palace	2019–20	Premier League	0	0	1	0	1	0	0	0	2	0
Crystal Palace	2020–21	Premier League	0	0	0	0	1	0	0	0	1	0
Crystal Palace	Total		0	0	1	0	3	0	0	0	4	0
Hamilton Academical (loan)	2019–20	Scottish Premiership	3	1	0	0	0	0	0	0	3	1
Plymouth Argyle (loan)	2020–21	League One	9	1	—		—		—		9	1
Barnet	2021–22	National League	20	1	0	0	—		4 (Note: One appearance in the FA Trophy, three appearances and one goal in Middlesex Senior Cup)	1	24	2
Barnet	2022–23	National League	20	0	2	0	—		5 (Note: Four appearances in the FA Trophy, one appearance in Middlesex Senior Cup)	0	27	0
Barnet	Total		40	1	2	0	0	0	8	1	51	2
Cheshunt (loan)	2022–23	National League South	3	0	0	0	—		0	0	3	0
Career total			55	3	3	0	3	0	9	1	70	4

== Honours ==
Bromley

- National League play-offs: 2024
