= Tetzel =

Tetzel is a surname. Notable people with the surname include:

- Joan Tetzel (1921–1977), American actress
- Johann Tetzel (c. 1465–1519), German Dominican preacher during the Protestant Reformation

== See also ==
- Tezel
