= Ryan Hardie =

Scottish footballer (born 1997)

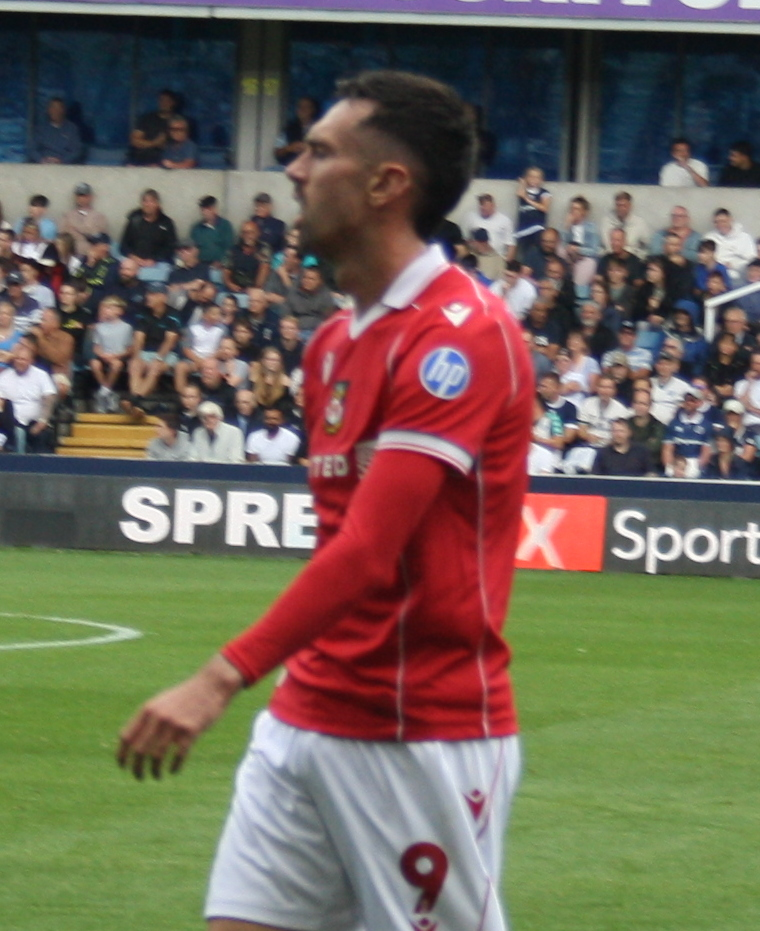
- Hardie in 2025

Personal information
- Full name: Ryan Hardie
- Date of birth: 17 March 1997 (age 29)
- Place of birth: Stranraer, Scotland
- Height: 1.88 m (6 ft 2 in)
- Position: Forward

Team information
- Current team: Bolton Wanderers (on loan from Wrexham)
- Number: 39

Youth career
- 2010–2014: Rangers

Senior career*
Years	Team	Apps	(Gls)
2014–2019	Rangers	13	(2)
2016	→ Raith Rovers (loan)	10	(6)
2016–2017	→ St Mirren (loan)	16	(3)
2017	→ Raith Rovers (loan)	18	(6)
2018–2019	→ Livingston (loan)	37	(15)
2019–2021	Blackpool	7	(0)
2020–2021	→ Plymouth Argyle (loan)	35	(10)
2021–2025	Plymouth Argyle	179	(53)
2025–	Wrexham	6	(0)
2026	→ Huddersfield Town (loan)	6	(2)
2026–	→ Bolton Wanderers (loan)	6	(0)

International career^{‡}
2012	Scotland U16	2	(0)
2014	Scotland U17	7	(1)
2015–2016	Scotland U19	8	(4)
2016	Scotland U20	5	(3)
2016–2018	Scotland U21	8	(1)
- * Club domestic league appearances and goals as of 06:11, 28 September 2026 (UTC) ‡ National team caps and goals as of 17:10, 6 November 2025 (UTC)

Ryan Hardie (born 17 March 1997) is a Scottish professional footballer who plays as a forward for EFL Championship club Bolton Wanderers, on loan from fellow EFL Championship club Wrexham.

Hardie started his career with Rangers, and was loaned by them to Raith Rovers, St Mirren and Livingston. In July 2019 he moved to English club Blackpool, with whom he remained for 18 months, before signing for Plymouth Argyle in January 2021. In June 2025, Hardie signed for Wrexham.

Hardie has represented Scotland at youth internationals up to and including the Under-21 level.

== Club career ==
=== Rangers ===
Hardie, from Stranraer, is a boyhood Rangers fan. He made his professional debut for the team in a League Cup match against Falkirk on 23 September 1 2014, replacing Dean Shiels for the last four minutes of a 3–1 win at the Falkirk Stadium. He was first called up for a league game on 15 November, remaining an unused substitute in a 1–1 draw with Alloa Athletic at Ibrox. On 28 March 2015, he made his Scottish Championship debut, replacing Nicky Clark for the final 16 minutes of a 4–1 home win over Cowdenbeath. Hardie's first start was on 18 April away to Dumbarton and he scored his first two professional goals as they came from behind to win 3–1, the second being an overhead kick from Lee Wallace's cross.

On 17 February 2016, Hardie was loaned out to Raith Rovers on an initial month-long loan; however, this was extended to the end of the season a month later. On 25 July 2016, Hardie joined Scottish Championship club St Mirren on loan until January 2017. He made his debut in the League Cup against Edinburgh City on 30 July 2016. Hardie moved on loan again to Raith Rovers in January 2017, on a deal until May 2017. In January 2018, he returned to the second tier of Scottish football, this time signing a six-month loan deal with Livingston. Upon his return to Rangers, Hardie signed a one-year contract extension to tie him to the club until 2019.

Hardie again signed on loan for Livingston for the first part of the 2018–19 season. In January 2019 he signed another one-year contract with Rangers, and returned on loan to Livingston.

=== Blackpool ===
Hardie moved to EFL League One club Blackpool for an undisclosed fee in July 2019. He scored his first goal for Blackpool when he scored in an EFL Trophy tie against Morecambe on 3 September 2019.

He signed on loan for Plymouth Argyle for the rest of the 2019–20 season on 9 January 2020. On 29 July, he returned to Plymouth on loan until the end of the 2020–21 season.

=== Plymouth Argyle ===
Halfway through his second loan spell at the club, Hardie completed a permanent move on 29 January 2021.

On 25 May 2023, Hardie signed a new three-year contract with Plymouth after finishing the 2022–23 League One season as the club's top scorer with 17 goals. Later that year, on 5 August, he scored his 50th goal for the club in 164 appearances during a 3–1 victory over Huddersfield Town.

Hardie scored his 100th career goal against West Bromwich Albion at Home Park on 1 February 2025.

On 9 February 2025, he scored a penalty against Premier League and UEFA Champions League league phase leaders Liverpool to knock them out of the FA Cup.

=== Wrexham ===
In June 2025, Hardie signed to play for Wrexham until the end of the 2027–28 season.

On 2 February 2026, Hardie signed for Huddersfield Town on loan until the end of the season.

On 11 August 2026, Hardie signed for Bolton Wanderers on loan until the end of the season.

== International career ==
Hardie has represented Scotland at various age levels.

Hardie was selected for the Scotland U17 team in the UEFA under-17 Championship in 2014, where the Netherlands beat them in the semi-finals.

He was selected for the under-20 squad in the 2017 Toulon Tournament. After a historic first ever win against Brazil, the first at any level, Scotland later won the bronze medal. It was the nations first ever medal at the competition.

== Career statistics ==
As of match played 12 September 2026

Appearances and goals by club, season and competition
Club	Season	League			National cup (Note: Includes Scottish Cup, FA Cup)		League cup (Note: Includes Scottish League Cup, EFL Cup)		Other		Total	
Club	Season	Division	Apps	Goals	Apps	Goals	Apps	Goals	Apps	Goals	Apps	Goals
Rangers	2014–15	Scottish Championship	5	2	0	0	1	0	0	0	6	2
Rangers	2015–16	Scottish Championship	1	0	1	0	1	0	1 (Note: Appearances in Scottish Challenge Cup)	0	4	0
Rangers	2017–18	Scottish Premiership	7	0	0	0	0	0	—		7	0
Rangers	Total		13	2	1	0	2	0	1	0	17	2
Raith Rovers (loan)	2015–16	Scottish Championship	10	6	0	0	0	0	2 (Note: Appearances in Scottish Premiership play-offs)	0	12	6
St Mirren (loan)	2016–17	Scottish Championship	16	3	0	0	1	0	0	0	17	3
Raith Rovers (loan)	2016–17	Scottish Championship	18	6	2	1	0	0	2 (Note: Appearances in Scottish Championship play-offs)	1	22	8
Livingston (loan)	2017–18	Scottish Championship	16	8	1	0	0	0	0	0	17	8
Livingston (loan)	2018–19	Scottish Premiership	21	7	1	0	0	0	—		22	7
Livingston (loan)	Total		37	15	2	0	0	0	0	0	39	15
Blackpool	2019–20	EFL League One	7	0	0	0	1	0	4 (Note: Appearances in EFL Trophy)	1	12	1
Plymouth Argyle (loan)	2019–20	EFL League Two	13	7	0	0	0	0	—		13	7
Plymouth Argyle (loan)	2020–21	EFL League One	22	3	4	1	2	0	2	0	30	4
Plymouth Argyle (loan)	Total		35	10	4	1	2	0	2	0	43	11
Plymouth Argyle	2020–21	EFL League One	21	2	0	0	0	0	—		21	2
Plymouth Argyle	2021–22	EFL League One	37	16	5	1	2	2	1	0	45	19
Plymouth Argyle	2022–23	EFL League One	44	13	1	0	1	0	8	4	54	17
Plymouth Argyle	2023–24	EFL Championship	40	12	3	1	2	0	—		45	13
Plymouth Argyle	2024–25	EFL Championship	37	10	1	1	2	1	—		40	12
Plymouth Argyle	Total		179	53	10	3	7	3	9	4	205	63
Wrexham	2025–26	EFL Championship	6	0	—		4	1	—		10	1
Wrexham	2026–27	EFL Championship	0	0	0	0	—		—		0	0
Wrexham	Total		6	0	—		—		—		10	1
Huddersfield Town (loan)	2025–26	EFL League One	6	2	—		4	1	—		10	3
Bolton Wanderers (loan)	2026–27	EFL Championship	6	0	0	0	—		—		6	0
Career total			333	96	19	5	21	5	20	6	393	113

== Honours ==
Plymouth Argyle

- EFL League One: 2022–23
- EFL Trophy runner-up: 2022–23
