= Neil Tabone =

Maltese footballer

Personal information
- Full name: Neil Tabone
- Date of birth: 1 October 1997 (age 29)
- Place of birth: Malta
- Position: Midfielder

Team information
- Current team: Valletta
- Number: 20

Senior career*
Years	Team	Apps	(Gls)
2012–2021	Żejtun Corinthians	125	(10)
2013–2014	→ Floriana (loan)	0	(0)
2021-2024	Gudja United	46	(0)
2024-	Valletta	5	(0)

International career^{‡}
2015	Malta U19	1	(0)
2018	Malta U21	1	(0)
2020–	Malta	1	(0)
- * Club domestic league appearances and goals as of 3 May 2025 ‡ National team caps and goals as of 18:40, 11 November 2020 (UTC)

Neil Tabone (born 1 October 1997) is a Maltese footballer who plays as a midfielder for Valletta and the Malta national team.

== Career ==
Tabone made his international debut for Malta on 11 November 2020 in a friendly match against Liechtenstein.

== Career statistics ==
=== International ===
As of 11 November 2020

Malta
Year	Apps	Goals
2020	1	0
Total	1	0
