= Rubin Wilson =

English footballer

Personal information
- Full name: Rubin James Wilson
- Date of birth: 8 October 2001 (age 25)
- Place of birth: Bodmin, Cornwall, England
- Position: Forward

Team information
- Current team: Falmouth Town

Youth career
- 2008–2015: Plymouth Argyle
- 2018–2019: Plymouth Argyle

Senior career*
Years	Team	Apps	(Gls)
2019–2021	Plymouth Argyle	0	(0)
2020	→ Dorchester Town (loan)	6	(1)
2021	Bideford	13	(1)
2021–2022	Wadebridge	3	(3)
2021–2022	Saltash United	18	(5)
2022–2023	Helston Athletic	48	(26)
2023-	Falmouth	85	(36)
- * Club domestic league appearances and goals as of 12:55, 11 May 2023 (UTC)

Rubin James Wilson (born 8 October 2001) is an English footballer who plays for Western League Premier Division side Helston Athletic, as a forward.

== Career ==
Wilson made his first team debut on his 18th birthday, 8 October 2019, coming on as a sub in an EFL Trophy match between Plymouth Argyle and Swindon Town. He replaced Antoni Sarcevic in the 78th minute.

Wilson had been set to start the 2020–21 season with Plymouth Parkway in the Western League Premier Division. However, FA regulations prevent a professional from playing below step four of the National League System, and so he joined Dorchester on three-month loan.

Wilson was released by the Pilgrims at the end of the 2020–21 season.
