= Jarvis Cleal =

English footballer

Personal information
- Full name: Jarvis Jai Cleal
- Place of birth: Yeovil, England
- Height: 6 ft 1 in (1.85 m)
- Positions: Wing-back; midfielder

Team information
- Current team: Plymouth Argyle
- Number: 42

Youth career
- 2015–2018: West Brom
- 2018–2020: Plymouth Argyle

College career
| Years | Team | Apps | (Gls) |
| 2021– | NC State Wolfpack | 19 | (0) |

Senior career*
| Years | Team | Apps | (Gls) |
| 2020–2021 | Plymouth Argyle | 1 | (0) |
- * Club domestic league appearances and goals as of 10 January 2023 (UTC)

Jarvis Jai Cleal is an English footballer who plays as a midfielder and wing-back for North Carolina State University. He had previously played in the English Football League for Plymouth Argyle.

== Career ==
Cleal was born in Yeovil, and left home aged 14 to join the West Bromwich Albion academy set-up. He left West Brom in the summer of 2018 and signed for Plymouth Argyle in October later that year.

On 28 January 2020 he first made an appearance in a match day squad, as an unused substitute in an EFL League Two match between Plymouth Argyle and Crawley Town, the game finished 2–2. Afterwards, manager Ryan Lowe praised Cleal as having done "great in the youth system," and challenged him to make the step up and "thrive and push on now."

Cleal made his professional debut on 7 March 2020 in an EFL League Two match between Argyle and Macclesfield Town, coming on as a substitute at right wing-back with just a few minutes left to play. Argyle won the match 3–0.

Cleal was released by The Pilgrims at the end of the 2020–21 season.
