= Uğur Tezel =

Turkish-German footballer

Personal information
- Full name: Uğur Oğulcan Tezel
- Date of birth: 27 February 1997 (age 29)
- Place of birth: Berlin, Germany
- Height: 1.81 m (5 ft 11 in)
- Position: Right-back

Team information
- Current team: VSG Altglienicke
- Number: 17

Youth career
- TSV Rudow
- –2011: Türkiyemspor Berlin
- 2011–2016: Hertha BSC

Senior career*
Years	Team	Apps	(Gls)
2016–2018	Hertha BSC II	59	(1)
2018–2020	Preußen Münster	2	(0)
2020–2022	Berliner AK 07	40	(3)
2022–2023	FC Carl Zeiss Jena	6	(0)
2023–	VSG Altglienicke	33	(0)

International career
2012	Turkey U16	4	(1)
2013–2014	Turkey U17	6	(0)
2014	Turkey U18	2	(0)
- * Club domestic league appearances and goals as of 3 May 2025

Uğur Oğulcan Tezel (born 27 February 1997) is a Turkish-German professional footballer who plays as a right-back for VSG Altglienicke.
