= 2021–22 EFL Trophy =

Papa John's Trophy

Tournament details
- Country: England; Wales
- Teams: 64

Final positions
- Champions: Rotherham United (2nd title)
- Runners-up: Sutton United

Tournament statistics
- Matches played: 127
- Goals scored: 404 (3.18 per match)
- Attendance: 257,625 (2,029 per match)
- Top goal scorer: (England) Cameron Archer Aston Villa U21 (6 goals)

The 2021–22 EFL Trophy, known as the Papa Johns Trophy for sponsorship reasons, the 41st season in the history of the competition, was a knock-out tournament for clubs in EFL League One and League Two, the third and fourth tiers of the English football league system, as well as the "Academy teams" of 16 Premier League clubs with Category One status.

Rotherham United won the title after beating Sutton United 4–2 after extra time in the final on 3 April 2022. Sunderland were the defending champions, but they were knocked out in the Second Round by Oldham Athletic.

== Participating clubs ==
- 48 clubs from League One and League Two.
- 16 invited Category One Academy teams.

	League One	League Two	Academies
Clubs	Accrington Stanley; AFC Wimbledon; Bolton Wanderers; Burton Albion; Cambridge United; Charlton Athletic; Cheltenham Town; Crewe Alexandra; Doncaster Rovers; Fleetwood Town; Gillingham; Ipswich Town; Lincoln City; Milton Keynes Dons; Morecambe; Oxford United; Plymouth Argyle; Portsmouth; Rotherham United; Sheffield Wednesday; Shrewsbury Town; Sunderland; Wigan Athletic; Wycombe Wanderers	Barrow; Bradford City; Bristol Rovers; Carlisle United; Colchester United; Crawley Town; Exeter City; Forest Green Rovers; Harrogate Town; Hartlepool United; Leyton Orient; Mansfield Town; Newport County; Northampton Town; Oldham Athletic; Port Vale; Rochdale; Salford City; Scunthorpe United; Stevenage; Sutton United; Swindon Town; Tranmere Rovers; Walsall	Arsenal; Aston Villa; Brighton & Hove Albion; Chelsea; Crystal Palace; Everton; Leeds United; Leicester City; Liverpool; Manchester City; Manchester United; Newcastle United; Southampton; Tottenham Hotspur; West Ham United; Wolverhampton Wanderers
Total	24	24	16

== Eligibility criteria for players ==
For EFL clubs

- Minimum of four qualifying outfield players in their starting XI. A qualifying outfield player was one who met any of the following requirements:
  - Any player who started the previous or following first-team fixture.
  - Any player who is in the top 10 players at the club who has made the most starting appearances in league and domestic cup competitions this season.
  - Any player with forty or more first-team starting appearances in their career, including International matches.
  - Any player on loan from a Premier League club or any EFL Category One Academy club.
- A club can play any eligible goalkeeper in the competition.
- Any player out on a long loan term at a National League, National League North, or National League South team can play as long as the loaning team agree to allow the player to return for the match.

For invited teams

- Minimum of six players in the starting line-up who are aged under 21 on 30 June 2021.
- Maximum of two players on the team sheet who are aged over 21 and have also made forty or more senior appearances.

== Competition format ==
Group stage

- Sixteen groups of four teams were organised on a regionalised basis.
- All groups included one invited club.
- All clubs played each other once, either home or away (Academies played all group matches away from home).
- Clubs were awarded three points for a win and one point for a draw.
- In the event of a drawn game (after 90 minutes), a penalty shoot-out was held with the winning team earning an additional point.
- Clubs expelled from the EFL were knocked out of the tournament automatically.
- The top two teams in each group progressed to the knockout stage.

Knockout stage

- Round 2 and 3 of the competition were drawn on a regionalised basis.
- In Round 2, the group winners were seeded and the group runners-up were unseeded in the draw.
- In Round 2, teams who played in the same group as each other in the group stage were kept apart from each other.

== Group stage ==
=== Northern Section ===
==== Group A ====
Pos	Div	Team	Pld	W	PW	PL	L	GF	GA	GD	Pts	Qualification
1	L2	Carlisle United	3	2	1	0	0	7	3	+4	8	Advance to Round 2
2	L2	Hartlepool United	3	1	1	1	0	6	5	+1	6	Advance to Round 2
3	ACA	Everton U21	3	1	0	0	2	1	3	−2	3	
4	L1	Morecambe	3	0	0	1	2	2	5	−3	1	

Source: EFL.com

31 August 2021	Carlisle United	3–3 (4–3 p)	Hartlepool United	Carlisle
19:00 BST	Charters 11'; Mampala 59', (yellow card) 67'; Abrahams 78'	Report	Daly 18'; Molyneux 81'; Olomola 89' (pen.)	Stadium: Brunton Park; Attendance: 1,360; Referee: James Bell
	Penalties
	Clough (penalty scored); Abrahams (penalty missed); Young (penalty scored); Armer (penalty scored); Charters (penalty scored)		Burey (penalty missed); Daly (penalty scored); Olomola (penalty scored); Crawford (penalty missed); Molyneux (penalty scored)

14 September 2021	Morecambe	0–1	Everton U21	Morecambe
19:00 BST		Report	McAllister 64'	Stadium: Globe Arena; Attendance: 1,004; Referee: Andy Haines

28 September 2021	Carlisle United	2–0	Everton U21	Carlisle
19:00 BST	Young 44', 67'	Report		Stadium: Brunton Park; Attendance: 875; Referee: Seb Stockbridge

5 October 2021	Hartlepool United	2–2 (4–2 p)	Morecambe	Hartlepool
19:00 BST	Daly 8', 83'	Report	McLoughlin 33'; Jones 40' (pen.)	Stadium: Victoria Park; Attendance: 1,572; Referee: Simon Mather
	Penalties
	Daly (penalty scored); Molyneux (penalty scored); Ferguson (penalty scored); Crawford (penalty scored)		Cooney (penalty scored); McLoughlin (penalty missed); Gnahoua (penalty missed); Jones (penalty scored)

2 November 2021	Hartlepool United	1–0	Everton U21	Hartlepool
19:00 GMT	Daly 71'	Report		Stadium: Victoria Park; Attendance: 1,990; Referee: Stephen Wade

9 November 2021	Morecambe	0–2	Carlisle United	Morecambe
19:00 GMT		Report	Gibson 49'; Mellor 54'	Stadium: Globe Arena; Attendance: 945; Referee: Ross Joyce

==== Group B ====
Pos	Div	Team	Pld	W	PW	PL	L	GF	GA	GD	Pts	Qualification
1	L2	Tranmere Rovers	3	3	0	0	0	9	3	+6	9	Advance to Round 2
2	L2	Oldham Athletic	3	1	0	0	2	5	6	−1	3	Advance to Round 2
3	L2	Salford City	3	1	0	0	2	5	6	−1	3	
4	ACA	Leeds United U21	3	1	0	0	2	7	11	−4	3	

Source: EFL.com

31 August 2021	Oldham Athletic	1–0	Salford City	Oldham
19:00 BST	Piergianni 43'	Report		Stadium: Boundary Park; Attendance: 1,915; Referee: James Oldham

14 September 2021	Tranmere Rovers	4–1	Leeds United U21	Birkenhead
19:00 BST	Maynard 7', 41'; Foley 34', 87'	Report	Miller 63'	Stadium: Prenton Park; Attendance: 1,209; Referee: Simon Mather

28 September 2021	Oldham Athletic	2–3	Leeds United U21	Oldham
19:00 BST	Dearnley 78'; Keillor-Dunn 90+3'	Report	Summerville 42' (pen.); McGahey 58' (o.g.); Jameson 80' (o.g.)	Stadium: Boundary Park; Attendance: 732; Referee: Andrew Kitchen

5 October 2021	Salford City	0–2	Tranmere Rovers	Salford
19:00 BST		Report	Watson 16'; Walker 86'	Stadium: Moor Lane; Attendance: 720; Referee: Ollie Yates

2 November 2021	Salford City	5–3	Leeds United U21	Salford
19:00 GMT	Thomas-Asante 26', 59'; Touray 32'; Oteh 39'; Turnbull 70'	Report	Dean 9'; Greenwood 35'; Bate 68'	Stadium: Moor Lane; Attendance: 427; Referee: Carl Boyeson

9 November 2021	Tranmere Rovers	3–2	Oldham Athletic	Birkenhead
19:00 GMT	Glatzel 45+2', 75'; Maynard 55'	Report	Dearnley 15', 43'	Stadium: Prenton Park; Attendance: 1,405; Referee: Marc Edwards

==== Group C ====
Pos	Div	Team	Pld	W	PW	PL	L	GF	GA	GD	Pts	Qualification
1	L1	Crewe Alexandra	3	3	0	0	0	6	0	+6	9	Advance to Round 2
2	L1	Wigan Athletic	3	1	0	1	1	2	2	0	4	Advance to Round 2
3	L1	Shrewsbury Town	3	1	0	0	2	3	4	−1	3	
4	ACA	Wolverhampton Wanderers U21	3	0	1	0	2	1	6	−5	2	

Source: EFL.com

31 August 2021	Shrewsbury Town	0–1	Crewe Alexandra	Shrewsbury
19:00 BST		Report	Knight 90+2'	Stadium: New Meadow; Attendance: 1,680; Referee: Seb Stockbridge

31 August 2021	Wigan Athletic	0–0 (2–4 p)	Wolverhampton Wanderers U21	Wigan
19:00 BST		Report		Stadium: DW Stadium; Attendance: 1,240; Referee: Marc Edwards
	Penalties
	Humphreys (penalty scored); Massey (penalty scored); Aasgaard (penalty missed); Edwards (penalty missed)		Carty (penalty scored); Campbell (penalty scored); Cundle (penalty scored); Richards (penalty missed); Kandola (penalty scored)

5 October 2021	Crewe Alexandra	2–0	Wigan Athletic	Crewe
19:00 BST	Finney 14'; Smith 60' (o.g.)	Report		Stadium: Gresty Road; Attendance: 925; Referee: Tom Reeves

5 October 2021	Shrewsbury Town	3–1	Wolverhampton Wanderers U21	Shrewsbury
19:00 BST	Bloxham 72'; Lloyd 78'; Pyke 90+2'	Report	Hesketh 31'	Stadium: New Meadow; Attendance: 1,334; Referee: Lee Swabey

9 November 2021	Crewe Alexandra	3–0	Wolverhampton Wanderers U21	Crewe
19:00 GMT	Mandron 12', 36'; Robbins 79'	Report		Stadium: Gresty Road; Attendance: 598; Referee: Martin Coy

10 November 2021	Wigan Athletic	2–0	Shrewsbury Town	Wigan
19:00 GMT	Long 9'; Sze 53'	Report		Stadium: DW Stadium; Attendance: 1,121; Referee: Scott Oldham

==== Group D ====
Pos	Div	Team	Pld	W	PW	PL	L	GF	GA	GD	Pts	Qualification
1	L1	Bolton Wanderers	3	3	0	0	0	10	3	+7	9	Advance to Round 2
2	L2	Port Vale	3	2	0	0	1	8	3	+5	6	Advance to Round 2
3	L2	Rochdale	3	1	0	0	2	4	4	0	3	
4	ACA	Liverpool U21	3	0	0	0	3	1	13	−12	0	

Source: EFL.com

31 August 2021	Bolton Wanderers	3–2	Port Vale	Horwich
19:00 BST	Doyle 28'; Delfouneso 54'; Afolayan 77'	Report	Conlon 35'; Amoo 43'	Stadium: University of Bolton Stadium; Attendance: 2,926; Referee: Scott Oldham

31 August 2021	Rochdale	4–0	Liverpool U21	Rochdale
19:00 BST	L. Kelly 33'; O'Keeffe 50' (pen.), 72'; Andrews 78'	Report		Stadium: Spotland Stadium; Attendance: 1,107; Referee: Ben Toner

5 October 2021	Bolton Wanderers	4–1	Liverpool U21	Horwich
19:00 BST	Delfouneso 28'; Bakayoko 58', 81' (pen.); Quansah 66' (o.g.)	Report	Dixon-Bonner 72'	Stadium: University of Bolton Stadium; Attendance: 2,299; Referee: Andy Haines

5 October 2021	Port Vale	1–0	Rochdale	Stoke-on-Trent
19:00 BST	Taylor 90+3' (o.g.)	Report		Stadium: Vale Park; Attendance: 1,727; Referee: James Oldham

2 November 2021	Rochdale	0–3	Bolton Wanderers	Rochdale
19:00 GMT		Report	Afolayan 16'; John 19'; Doyle 45+1' (pen.)	Stadium: Spotland Stadium; Attendance: 1,160; Referee: Andrew Kitchen

9 November 2021	Port Vale	5–0	Liverpool U21	Stoke-on-Trent
19:00 GMT	Lloyd 15'; Politic 26'; Benning 51'; Martin 63'; Taylor 77'	Report		Stadium: Vale Park; Attendance: 2,349; Referee: Tom Nield

==== Group E ====
Pos	Div	Team	Pld	W	PW	PL	L	GF	GA	GD	Pts	Qualification
1	L1	Rotherham United	3	3	0	0	0	15	1	+14	9	Advance to Round 2
2	L1	Doncaster Rovers	3	2	0	0	1	5	9	−4	6	Advance to Round 2
3	ACA	Manchester City U21	3	1	0	0	2	4	7	−3	3	
4	L2	Scunthorpe United	3	0	0	0	3	3	10	−7	0	

Source: EFL.com

24 August 2021	Scunthorpe United	0–3	Manchester City U21	Scunthorpe
19:00 BST		Report	Palmer 6'; Bolton 24'; McAtee 84'	Stadium: Glanford Park; Attendance: 860; Referee: Andy Haines

7 September 2021	Doncaster Rovers	0–6	Rotherham United	Doncaster
19:00 BST		Report	Miller 13'; Ladapo 15'; Jones 16' (o.g.); Grigg 49'; Hull 67'; Mattock 85'	Stadium: Keepmoat Stadium; Attendance: 1,765; Referee: Ben Speedie

21 September 2021	Doncaster Rovers	2–1	Manchester City U21	Doncaster
19:00 BST	Dodoo 14', 58'	Report	Edozie 8'	Stadium: Keepmoat Stadium; Attendance: 1,802; Referee: Ben Toner

5 October 2021	Rotherham United	4–1	Scunthorpe United	Rotherham
19:00 BST	Grigg 8'; Ladapo 20'; Odoffin 82'; Smith 90+1'	Report	Loft 65'	Stadium: New York Stadium; Attendance: 1,439; Referee: Andrew Kitchen

26 October 2021	Rotherham United	5–0	Manchester City U21	Rotherham
19:00 BST	Grigg 51'; Sadlier 63' (pen.), 81', 90'; Hull 66'	Report		Stadium: New York Stadium; Attendance: 1,908; Referee: Sam Barrott

9 November 2021	Scunthorpe United	2–3	Doncaster Rovers	Scunthorpe
19:00 GMT	Loft 88'; Scrimshaw 90'	Report	Vilca 5'; Dodoo 16', 58'	Stadium: Glanford Park; Attendance: 1,011; Referee: Thomas Brammall

==== Group F ====
Pos	Div	Team	Pld	W	PW	PL	L	GF	GA	GD	Pts	Qualification
1	L1	Sunderland	3	2	0	1	0	5	3	+2	7	Advance to Round 2
2	L1	Lincoln City	3	2	0	0	1	7	4	+3	6	Advance to Round 2
3	ACA	Manchester United U21	3	1	0	0	2	6	5	+1	3	
4	L2	Bradford City	3	0	1	0	2	1	7	−6	2	

Source: EFL.com

24 August 2021	Lincoln City	3–2	Manchester United U21	Lincoln
19:00 GMT	Scully 23', 32', 57'	Report	McNeill 68'; Hardley 89'	Stadium: Sincil Bank; Attendance: 3,510; Referee: Chris Sarginson

31 August 2021	Bradford City	0–3	Lincoln City	Bradford
19:00 BST			Hopper 14'; Adelakun 36'; Scully 89'	Stadium: Valley Parade; Attendance: 1,739

5 October 2021	Bradford City	0–3	Manchester United U21	Bradford
19:00 BST		Report	Songo'o 47' (o.g.); Hugill 57'; Hoogewerf 82'	Stadium: Valley Parade; Attendance: 2,022; Referee: Anthony Backhouse

5 October 2021	Lincoln City	1–2	Sunderland	Lincoln
19:00 BST	Montsma 90+4'	Report	Neil 2'; Wearne 72'	Stadium: Sincil Bank; Attendance: 3,060; Referee: Scott Oldham

13 October 2021	Sunderland	2–1	Manchester United U21	Sunderland
19:00 BST	Dyce 50'; Wearne 66'	Report	Iqbal 57'	Stadium: Stadium of Light; Attendance: 3,960; Referee: Ross Joyce

9 November 2021	Sunderland	1–1 (2–4 p)	Bradford City	Sunderland
19:00 GMT	Broadhead 52'	Report	Robinson 36'	Stadium: Stadium of Light; Attendance: NA; Referee: Simon Mather
	Penalties
	Pritchard (penalty missed); O'Nien (penalty scored); Harris (penalty scored); Gooch (penalty missed)		Watt (penalty missed); Cooke (penalty scored); Sutton (penalty scored); Scales (penalty scored); Evans (penalty scored)

==== Group G ====
Pos	Div	Team	Pld	W	PW	PL	L	GF	GA	GD	Pts	Qualification
1	L1	Accrington Stanley	3	2	1	0	0	11	3	+8	8	Advance to Round 2
2	L1	Fleetwood Town	3	2	0	0	1	8	6	+2	6	Advance to Round 2
3	L2	Barrow	3	1	0	1	1	4	5	−1	4	
4	ACA	Leicester City U21	3	0	0	0	3	1	10	−9	0	

Source: EFL.com

31 August 2021	Accrington Stanley	2–2 (5–4 p)	Barrow	Accrington
19:45 BST	Bishop 21', 50'	Report	Arthur 48'; Banks 72' (pen.)	Stadium: Crown Ground; Attendance: 930; Referee: Chris Sarginson
	Penalties
	Bishop (penalty scored); Nottingham (penalty scored); Leigh (penalty scored); Savin (penalty scored); Scully (penalty scored)		Banks (penalty scored); Williams (penalty scored); Zanzala (penalty scored); Brough (penalty scored); Gordon (penalty missed)

31 August 2021	Fleetwood Town	4–1	Leicester City U21	Fleetwood
19:45 BST	Morton 6', 42', 48'; Edmondson 60'	Report	Wakeling 75'	Stadium: Highbury Stadium; Attendance: 566; Referee: Sam Barrott

5 October 2021	Accrington Stanley	5–0	Leicester City U21	Accrington
19:45 BST	Leigh 24'; Nottingham 32'; Nolan 51'; O'Sullivan 53'; Malcolm 62'	Report		Stadium: Crown Ground; Attendance: 885; Referee: Peter Wright

5 October 2021	Barrow	1–3	Fleetwood Town	Barrow-in-Furness
19:45 BST	Zanzala 28'	Report	Matete 48'; Edmondson 55'; McMillan 67'	Stadium: Holker Street; Attendance: 1,281; Referee: Robert Lewis

9 November 2021	Barrow	1–0	Leicester City U21	Barrow-in-Furness
19:45 GMT	Stevens 90+1'	Report		Stadium: Holker Street; Attendance: 575; Referee: Anthony Backhouse

9 November 2021	Fleetwood Town	1–4	Accrington Stanley	Fleetwood
19:45 GMT	Garner 37' (pen.)	Report	Pell 23'; Hamilton 42'; Leigh 50'; Nottingham 86'	Stadium: Highbury Stadium; Attendance: 633; Referee: James Bell

==== Group H ====
Pos	Div	Team	Pld	W	PW	PL	L	GF	GA	GD	Pts	Qualification
1	L1	Sheffield Wednesday	3	3	0	0	0	9	1	+8	9	Advance to Round 2
2	L2	Harrogate Town	3	2	0	0	1	5	5	0	6	Advance to Round 2
3	L2	Mansfield Town	3	1	0	0	2	8	8	0	3	
4	ACA	Newcastle United U21	3	0	0	0	3	3	11	−8	0	

Source: EFL.com

31 August 2021	Sheffield Wednesday	3–0	Newcastle United U21	Sheffield
19:00 BST	Sow 41'; Johnson 52'; Palmer 54'	Report		Stadium: Hillsborough Stadium; Attendance: 6,593; Referee: Peter Wright

31 August 2021	Harrogate Town	3–1	Mansfield Town	Harrogate
19:45 BST	Orsi-Dadomo 44', 53', 69'	Report	Lapslie 66'	Stadium: Wetherby Road; Attendance: 825; Referee: Andy Haines

5 October 2021	Harrogate Town	2–0	Newcastle United U21	Harrogate
19:45 BST	Kerry 6'; Orsi-Dadomo 45'	Report		Stadium: Wetherby Road; Attendance: 920; Referee: Anthony Backhouse

5 October 2021	Mansfield Town	1–2	Sheffield Wednesday	Mansfield
19:45 BST	Quinn 68'	Report	Wing 63'; Kamberi 90+3'	Stadium: Field Mill; Attendance: 2,836; Referee: Rebecca Welch

9 November 2021	Sheffield Wednesday	4–0	Harrogate Town	Sheffield
19:00 GMT	Berahino 17' Byers 57' Sow 60' Adedoyin 68'	Report		Stadium: Hillsborough Stadium; Attendance: 5,433; Referee: Trevor Kettle

9 November 2021	Mansfield Town	6–3	Newcastle United U21	Mansfield
19:45 GMT	Johnson 16', 53', 70' (pen.); O'Toole 45+2'; Sinclair 78' (pen.); Caine 90+2'	Report	Stephenson 5'; White 23'; Ndiweni 90'	Stadium: Field Mill; Attendance: 805; Referee: Alan Young

=== Southern Section ===
==== Group A ====
Pos	Div	Team	Pld	W	PW	PL	L	GF	GA	GD	Pts	Qualification
1	L1	Ipswich Town	3	1	1	0	1	3	2	+1	5	Advance to Round 2
2	L2	Colchester United	3	1	0	1	1	1	1	0	4	Advance to Round 2
3	ACA	West Ham United U21	3	2	0	0	1	4	2	+2	3 (Note: West Ham U21 deducted 3 points for fielding an ineligible player in their match with Gillingham.)	
4	L1	Gillingham	3	1	0	0	2	1	4	−3	3	

Source: EFL.com
Notes:

7 September 2021	Colchester United	0–1	Gillingham	Colchester
19:30 BST		Report	McKenzie 90+3'	Stadium: Colchester Community Stadium; Attendance: 731; Referee: Brett Huxtable

14 September 2021	Ipswich Town	1–2	West Ham United U21	Ipswich
19:45 BST	Norwood 2'	Report	Appiah-Forson 12'; Oko-Flex 89' (pen.)	Stadium: Portman Road; Attendance: 4,231; Referee: Charles Breakspear

28 September 2021	Colchester United	1–0	West Ham United U21	Colchester
19:30 BST	Dobra 7'	Report		Stadium: Colchester Community Stadium; Attendance: 962; Referee: David Rock

5 October 2021	Gillingham	0–2	Ipswich Town	Gillingham
19:00 BST		Report	Pigott 43'; Chaplin 72'	Stadium: Priestfield Stadium; Attendance: 1,116; Referee: Trevor Kettle

26 October 2021	Gillingham	0–2	West Ham United U21	Gillingham
19:00 BST		Report	Ashby 22'; Nevers 33'	Stadium: Priestfield Stadium; Attendance: 819; Referee: Craig Hicks

9 November 2021	Ipswich Town	0–0 (4–3 p)	Colchester United	Ipswich
19:45 GMT		Report		Stadium: Portman Road; Attendance: 8,100; Referee: Paul Howard
	Penalties
	Pigott (penalty missed); Chaplin (penalty scored); Harper (penalty scored); Celina (penalty scored); Aluko (penalty scored)		Sears (penalty missed); Chilvers (penalty scored); Hannant (penalty scored); Coxe (penalty scored); Cooper (penalty missed)

==== Group B ====
Pos	Div	Team	Pld	W	PW	PL	L	GF	GA	GD	Pts	Qualification
1	L2	Sutton United	3	3	0	0	0	6	0	+6	9	Advance to Round 2
2	L1	Portsmouth	3	1	0	0	2	6	7	−1	3	Advance to Round 2
3	L1	AFC Wimbledon	3	1	0	0	2	5	6	−1	3	
4	ACA	Crystal Palace U21	3	1	0	0	2	2	6	−4	3	

Source: EFL.com

31 August 2021	Sutton United	3–0	Crystal Palace U21	Sutton, London
19:30 BST	Sho-Silva 31'; Smith 52'; Korboa 81'	Report		Stadium: Gander Green Lane; Attendance: 1,504; Referee: David Rock

7 September 2021	AFC Wimbledon	5–3	Portsmouth	Wimbledon, London
19:45 BST	Kalambayi 2'; Pressley 43', 80' (pen.); Nightingale 87'; McCormick 90+4'	Report	Harrison 45+4', 52', 78'	Stadium: Plough Lane; Attendance: 3,600; Referee: Darren Drysdale

12 October 2021	Portsmouth	0–2	Sutton United	Portsmouth
19:45 BST		Report	Olaofe 55'; John 71'	Stadium: Fratton Park; Attendance: 2,490; Referee: Lee Swabey

26 October 2021	AFC Wimbledon	0–2	Crystal Palace U21	Wimbledon, London
19:45 BST		Report	Rak-Sakyi 57'; Street 83'	Stadium: Plough Lane; Attendance: 2,397; Referee: Sam Allison

9 November 2021	Sutton United	1–0	AFC Wimbledon	Sutton, London
19:45 GMT	Wilson 47'	Report		Stadium: Gander Green Lane; Attendance: 2,458; Referee: Neil Hair

9 November 2021	Portsmouth	3–0	Crystal Palace U21	Portsmouth
19:45 GMT	Azeez 32'; Ahadme 54'; Hirst 90+3'	Report		Stadium: Fratton Park; Attendance: 1,660; Referee: Will Finnie

==== Group C ====
Pos	Div	Team	Pld	W	PW	PL	L	GF	GA	GD	Pts	Qualification
1	ACA	Aston Villa U21	3	3	0	0	0	11	5	+6	9	Advance to Round 2
2	L1	Milton Keynes Dons	3	2	0	0	1	6	6	0	6	Advance to Round 2
3	L1	Burton Albion	3	1	0	0	2	8	6	+2	3	
4	L1	Wycombe Wanderers	3	0	0	0	3	2	10	−8	0	

Source: EFL.com

31 August 2021	Burton Albion	1–2	Milton Keynes Dons	Burton upon Trent
19:00 BST	O'Riley 67' (o.g.)	Report	Bird 58'; Darling 63'	Stadium: Pirelli Stadium; Attendance: 690; Referee: Brett Huxtable

31 August 2021	Wycombe Wanderers	1–3	Aston Villa U21	High Wycombe
19:00 BST	Parsons 11'	Report	Archer 42'; Philogene 68', 90+9'	Stadium: Adams Park; Attendance: 1,409; Referee: Paul Howard

5 October 2021	Burton Albion	2–4	Aston Villa U21	Burton upon Trent
19:00 BST	Jebbison 20'; Hemmings 23'	Report	Archer 35', 61', 71'; Abldeen-Goodridge 51'	Stadium: Pirelli Stadium; Attendance: 1,108; Referee: Chris Sarginson

5 October 2021	Milton Keynes Dons	2–1	Wycombe Wanderers	Milton Keynes
19:00 BST	Boateng 4'; Jules 64'	Report	Hanlan 8'	Stadium: Stadium MK; Attendance: 1,320; Referee: Christopher Pollard

26 October 2021	Milton Keynes Dons	2–4	Aston Villa U21	Milton Keynes
19:00 BST	Parrott 16'; Watters 25'	Report	Davis 13'; Archer 45+1', 90+1'; Ramsey 58'	Stadium: Stadium MK; Attendance: 2,683; Referee: Tom Nield

9 November 2021	Wycombe Wanderers	0–5	Burton Albion	High Wycombe
19:00 GMT		Report	Amadi-Holloway 50', 71', 90+3'; Lakin 75'; Smith 76'	Stadium: Adams Park; Attendance: 593; Referee: Ben Speedie

==== Group D ====
Pos	Div	Team	Pld	W	PW	PL	L	GF	GA	GD	Pts	Qualification
1	L2	Forest Green Rovers	3	1	1	1	0	5	3	+2	6	Advance to Round 2
2	L2	Walsall	3	1	1	0	1	2	3	−1	5	Advance to Round 2
3	ACA	Brighton & Hove Albion U21	3	1	0	1	1	4	4	0	4	
4	L2	Northampton Town	3	0	1	1	1	3	4	−1	3	

Source: EFL.com

31 August 2021	Forest Green Rovers	1–1 (2–4 p)	Northampton Town	Nailsworth
19:00 BST	Harriman 14' (o.g.)	Report	Pollock 51'	Stadium: The New Lawn; Attendance: 892; Referee: Christopher Pollard
	Penalties
	Stevens (penalty scored); Evans (penalty missed); Matt (penalty missed); Adams (penalty scored)		Rose (penalty scored); Kabamba (penalty scored); Connolly (penalty scored); McWilliams (penalty missed); Pollock (penalty scored)

14 September 2021	Walsall	1–0	Brighton & Hove Albion U21	Walsall
19:00 BST	Phillips 44'	Report		Stadium: Bescot Stadium; Attendance: 1,229; Referee: Antony Coggins

5 October 2021	Northampton Town	1–1 (2–4 p)	Walsall	Northampton
19:00 BST	Connolly 72' (pen.)	Report	Osadebe 4'	Stadium: Sixfields Stadium; Attendance: 1,285; Referee: Charles Breakspear
	Penalties
	Pinnock (penalty missed); Connolly (penalty scored); Etete (penalty missed); Flores (penalty scored)		Earing (penalty scored); Shade (penalty scored); Labadie (penalty scored); Phillips (penalty scored)

12 October 2021	Forest Green Rovers	2–2 (5–3 p)	Brighton & Hove Albion U21	Nailsworth
19:45 BST	Stevens 27' (pen.), 56'	Report	Miller 34'; Tolaj 63'	Stadium: The New Lawn; Attendance: 604; Referee: Antony Coggins
	Penalties
	Cargill (penalty scored); March (penalty scored); Edwards (penalty scored); Aitchison (penalty scored); Young (penalty scored)		Leonard (penalty missed); Spong (penalty scored); Tolaj (penalty scored); Peupion (penalty scored)

2 November 2021	Northampton Town	1–2	Brighton & Hove Albion U21	Northampton
19:00 GMT	Kabamba 37'	Report	Ferguson 71'; Tolaj 90+3'	Stadium: Sixfields Stadium; Attendance: 1,014; Referee: Christopher Pollard

10 November 2021	Walsall	0–2	Forest Green Rovers	Walsall
19:00 GMT		Report	Stevens 15'; Young 88'	Stadium: Bescot Stadium; Attendance: 1,778; Referee: Tom Reeves

==== Group E ====
Pos	Div	Team	Pld	W	PW	PL	L	GF	GA	GD	Pts	Qualification
1	L2	Exeter City	3	1	1	1	0	8	6	+2	6	Advance to Round 2
2	ACA	Chelsea U21	3	1	1	1	0	3	2	+1	6	Advance to Round 2
3	L2	Bristol Rovers	3	1	0	0	2	6	7	−1	3	
4	L1	Cheltenham Town	3	0	1	1	1	2	4	−2	3	

Source: EFL.com

24 August 2021	Exeter City	1–1 (3–4 p)	Chelsea U21	Exeter
19:00 BST	Jay 90+1' (pen.)	Report	Fiabema 45'	Stadium: St James Park; Attendance: 1,669; Referee: Robert Lewis
	Penalties
	Jay (penalty missed); Nombe (penalty scored); Brown (penalty scored); Seymour (penalty scored); Dodd (penalty missed)		Vale (penalty scored); Elliott (penalty scored); Nunn (penalty scored); Mbuyamba (penalty scored); Fiabema (penalty missed)

31 August 2021	Bristol Rovers	2–0	Cheltenham Town	Bristol
19:00 BST	Nicholson 61'; Saunders 70'	Report		Stadium: Memorial Stadium; Attendance: 889; Referee: Will Finnie

5 October 2021	Cheltenham Town	2–2 (2–3 p)	Exeter City	Cheltenham
19:30 BST	Chapman 37'; Miles 70'	Report	Daniel 8'; Collins 38'	Stadium: Whaddon Road; Attendance: 987; Referee: Craig Hicks
	Penalties
	Norton (penalty scored); Hussey (penalty scored); Freestone (penalty missed); Bonds (penalty missed); Vassell (penalty missed)		Amond (penalty missed); Sweeney (penalty scored); Cox (penalty missed); Caprice (penalty scored); Kite (penalty scored)

13 October 2021	Bristol Rovers	1–2	Chelsea U21	Bristol
19:00 BST	Thomas 17'	Report	Lovelock 39' (o.g.); Baker 48'	Stadium: Memorial Stadium; Attendance: 1,149; Referee: Christopher Pollard

26 October 2021	Cheltenham Town	0–0 (5–4 p)	Chelsea U21	Cheltenham
19:00 GMT		Report		Stadium: Whaddon Road; Attendance: 2,932; Referee: Alan Young
	Penalties
	Chapman (penalty scored); Miles (penalty scored); May (penalty scored); Guinan (penalty scored); Norton (penalty scored)		Nunn (penalty scored); Wareham (penalty scored); Baker (penalty missed); Mbuyamba (penalty scored); Haigh (penalty scored)

10 November 2021	Exeter City	5–3	Bristol Rovers	Exeter
19:30 GMT	Coley 2', 44'; Dieng 4'; Amond 12', 38'	Report	Westbrooke 61'; Jones 72'; Anderton 88'	Stadium: St James Park; Attendance: 1,479; Referee: Chris Sarginson

==== Group F ====
Pos	Div	Team	Pld	W	PW	PL	L	GF	GA	GD	Pts	Qualification
1	L2	Swindon Town	3	3	0	0	0	6	2	+4	9	Advance to Round 2
2	ACA	Arsenal U21	3	1	0	1	1	6	6	0	4	Advance to Round 2
3	L2	Newport County	3	1	0	0	2	5	5	0	3	
4	L1	Plymouth Argyle	3	0	1	0	2	2	6	−4	2	

Source: EFL.com

31 August 2021	Newport County	2–0	Plymouth Argyle	Newport
19:00 BST	Telford 58'; Abraham 84'	Report		Stadium: Rodney Parade; Attendance: 1,032; Referee: Tom Reeves

7 September 2021	Swindon Town	2–1	Arsenal U21	Swindon
19:00 BST	Dabre 17'; Taylor-Hart 69' (o.g.)	Report	Ideho 34'	Stadium: County Ground; Attendance: 2,452; Referee: Lee Swabey

12 October 2021	Newport County	3–4	Arsenal U21	Newport
19:00 BST	Greenidge 19'; Abraham 62'; Fisher 68'	Report	Hutchinson 33'; Ouland M'hand 53'; Olayinka 86'; Sagoe Jr. 90+2'	Stadium: Rodney Parade; Attendance: 1,426; Referee: Chris Sarginson

12 October 2021	Plymouth Argyle	1–3	Swindon Town	Plymouth
19:00 BST	Agard 24'	Report	Gillesphey 20' (o.g.); Mitchell-Lawson 74'; McKirdy 84'	Stadium: Home Park; Attendance: 1,556; Referee: Sam Allison

2 November 2021	Plymouth Argyle	1–1 (5–4 p)	Arsenal U21	Plymouth
19:45 GMT	Agard 24'	Report	Balogun 56'	Stadium: Home Park; Attendance: 1,795; Referee: Will Finnie
	Penalties
	Gillesphey (penalty scored); Craske (penalty scored); Pursall (penalty scored); Agard (penalty scored); Jenkins-Davies (penalty missed); Shirley (penalty scored)		Balogun (penalty scored); Biereth (penalty scored); Swanson (penalty scored); Norton-Cuffy (penalty missed); Taylor-Hart (penalty scored); Olayinka (penalty missed)

9 November 2021	Swindon Town	1–0	Newport County	Swindon
19:00 GMT	Lyden 57'	Report		Stadium: County Ground; Attendance: 2,068; Referee: James Oldham

==== Group G ====
Pos	Div	Team	Pld	W	PW	PL	L	GF	GA	GD	Pts	Qualification
1	L2	Leyton Orient	3	3	0	0	0	6	0	+6	9	Advance to Round 2
2	L1	Charlton Athletic	3	2	0	0	1	10	3	+7	6	Advance to Round 2
3	ACA	Southampton U21	3	1	0	0	2	5	5	0	3	
4	L2	Crawley Town	3	0	0	0	3	1	14	−13	0	

Source: EFL.com

31 August 2021	Charlton Athletic	6–1	Crawley Town	Charlton, London
19:00 BST	Davison 6', 90'; Blackett-Taylor 18'; Lee 22'; Francomb 54' (o.g.); Burstow 82'	Report	Appiah 75' (pen.)	Stadium: The Valley; Attendance: 1,404; Referee: Neil Hair

14 September 2021	Leyton Orient	1–0	Southampton U21	Leyton, London
19:00 BST	Papadopoulos 82'	Report		Stadium: Brisbane Road; Attendance: 634; Referee: Trevor Kettle

5 October 2021	Charlton Athletic	4–1	Southampton U21	Charlton, London
19:00 BST	Stockley 28', 34' (pen.); Purrington 45+2'; Pearce 90+2'	Report	Lancashire 75'	Stadium: The Valley; Attendance: 689; Referee: David Rock

5 October 2021	Crawley Town	0–4	Leyton Orient	Crawley
19:00 BST		Report	Sotiriou 7', 59'; Happe 30'; Kemp 77'	Stadium: Broadfield Stadium; Attendance: 810; Referee: Will Finnie

9 November 2021	Crawley Town	0–4	Southampton U21	Crawley
19:00 GMT		Report	Olaigbe 28', 58'; Mitchell 41'; Small 88'	Stadium: Broadfield Stadium; Attendance: 385; Referee: Christopher Pollard

9 November 2021	Leyton Orient	1–0	Charlton Athletic	Leyton, London
19:00 GMT	Smyth 78'	Report		Stadium: Breyer Group Stadium; Attendance: 2,297; Referee: Sam Purkiss

==== Group H ====
Pos	Div	Team	Pld	W	PW	PL	L	GF	GA	GD	Pts	Qualification
1	L1	Cambridge United	3	2	0	0	1	5	2	+3	6	Advance to Round 2
2	L2	Stevenage	3	2	0	0	1	6	5	+1	6	Advance to Round 2
3	ACA	Tottenham Hotspur U21	3	1	0	0	2	6	7	−1	3	
4	L1	Oxford United	3	1	0	0	2	5	8	−3	3	

Source: EFL.com

31 August 2021	Cambridge United	4–1	Oxford United	Cambridge
19:00 BST	Smith 45', 45+3'; Knibbs 80'; Yearn 90+2'	Report	Agyei 71'	Stadium: Abbey Stadium; Attendance: 1,390; Referee: Sam Allison

31 August 2021	Stevenage	3–4	Tottenham Hotspur U21	Stevenage
19:00 BST	Daly 42'; Marshall 63'; Omole 88' (o.g.)	Report	White 8', 50'; Santiago 24'; Lyons-Foster 73'	Stadium: Broadhall Way; Attendance: 1,235; Referee: Carl Brook

21 September 2021	Cambridge United	1–0	Tottenham Hotspur U21	Cambridge
19:00 BST	Smith 72'	Report		Stadium: Abbey Stadium; Attendance: 2,025; Referee: Carl Boyeson

5 October 2021	Oxford United	1–2	Stevenage	Oxford
19:45 BST	Agyei 11'	Report	Reid 75'; Norris 90'	Stadium: Kassam Stadium; Attendance: 1,712; Referee: Ben Toner

26 October 2021	Oxford United	3–2	Tottenham Hotspur U21	Oxford
19:45 BST	Cooper 2', 28'; Gorrin 65'	Report	Scarlett 24' (pen.); Clarke 90'	Stadium: Kassam Stadium; Attendance: 1,702; Referee: Christopher Pollard

9 November 2021	Stevenage	1–0	Cambridge United	Stevenage
19:00 GMT	List 40'	Report		Stadium: Broadhall Way; Attendance: 967; Referee: Charles Breakspear

== Round 2 ==
The draw for the Second Round took place on Saturday 13 November 2021.

=== Northern section ===
30 November 2021	Bolton Wanderers	1–0	Fleetwood Town	Horwich
19:00 GMT	Lee 34'	Report		Stadium: University of Bolton Stadium; Attendance: 1,773; Referee: Benjamin Speedie

30 November 2021	Carlisle United	1–1 (4–3 p)	Lincoln City	Carlisle
19:00 GMT	Armer 69'	Report	Maguire 45'	Stadium: Brunton Park; Attendance: 884; Referee: James Bell
	Penalties
	Mellish (penalty missed); Armer (penalty scored); Whelan (penalty scored); Young (penalty scored); Charters (penalty scored)		Maguire (penalty missed); Fiorini (penalty scored); Bishop (penalty scored); McGrandles (penalty scored); Montsma (penalty missed)

30 November 2021	Rotherham United	1–1 (5–3 p)	Port Vale	Rotherham
19:00 GMT	Smith 56'	Report	Amoo 87'	Stadium: New York Stadium; Attendance: 1,560; Referee: Peter Wright
	Penalties
	Smith (penalty scored); Sadlier (penalty scored); Ferguson (penalty scored); Ladapo (penalty scored); Mattock (penalty scored)		Conlon (penalty scored); Walker (penalty scored); Rodney (penalty scored); Amoo (penalty missed)

30 November 2021	Accrington Stanley	1–1 (4–5 p)	Wigan Athletic	Accrington
19:45 GMT	Pell 18'	Report	Humphrys 53'	Stadium: Crown Ground; Attendance: 1,131; Referee: Bobby Madley
	Penalties
	Savin (penalty scored); Bishop (penalty scored); Pell (penalty scored); Sykes (penalty scored); Hamilton (penalty missed)		Jones (penalty scored); Massey (penalty scored); Bayliss (penalty scored); Watts (penalty scored); Kerr (penalty scored)

1 December 2021	Sheffield Wednesday	0–3	Hartlepool United	Sheffield
19:00 GMT		Report	Shelton 11'; Brown 14' (o.g.); Goodwin 59'	Stadium: Hillsborough Stadium; Attendance: 5,109; Referee: Andy Haines

1 December 2021	Sunderland	0–1	Oldham Athletic	Sunderland
19:00 GMT		Report	Vaughan 53'	Stadium: Stadium of Light; Attendance: 3,498; Referee: Tom Reeves

1 December 2021	Crewe Alexandra	2–0	Doncaster Rovers	Crewe
19:45 GMT	Knight 33'; Finney 72'	Report		Stadium: Gresty Road; Attendance: 699; Referee: Ross Joyce

21 December 2021	Tranmere Rovers	1–2	Harrogate Town	Birkenhead
19:00 GMT	Finney 11'	Report	Muldoon 53'; Pattison 71'	Stadium: Prenton Park; Referee: Sam Barrott
Note: This match was originally scheduled to be played on 30 November 2021. However, the match was postponed due to storm damage caused by Storm Arwen.

=== Southern section ===
30 November 2021	Cambridge United	2–0	Walsall	Cambridge
19:00 GMT	Smith 18' (pen.); Tracey 80'	Report		Stadium: Abbey Stadium; Attendance: 718; Referee: Will Finnie

30 November 2021	Charlton Athletic	2–1	Aston Villa U21	London
19:00 GMT	Burstow 15'; Stockley 43' (pen.)	Report	Thorndike 40'	Stadium: The Valley; Attendance: 1,283; Referee: Christopher Pollard
Note: As Aston Villa U21 finished top of their group, they were originally drawn as the home team. However, the match was then moved to place Charlton Athletic at home.

30 November 2021	Forest Green Rovers	1–1 (1–4 p)	Chelsea U21	Nailsworth
19:00 GMT	March 64'	Report	Uwakwe 65'	Stadium: The New Lawn; Attendance: 1,270; Referee: Ollie Yates
	Penalties
	Stevens (penalty missed); Bunker (penalty missed); March (penalty scored)		Baker (penalty scored); Nunn (penalty scored); Mbuyamba (penalty scored); Hall (penalty scored)

30 November 2021	Leyton Orient	0–0 (4–5 p)	Milton Keynes Dons	Leyton, London
19:00 GMT		Report		Stadium: Brisbane Road; Attendance: 990; Referee: Craig Hicks
	Penalties
	Sotiriou (penalty missed); James (penalty scored); Smith (penalty scored); Archibald (penalty scored); Happe (penalty scored)		Eisa (penalty scored); Boateng (penalty scored); Martin (penalty scored); Darling (penalty scored); Baldwin (penalty scored)

30 November 2021	Sutton United	0–0 (4–3 p)	Stevenage	Sutton, London
19:45 GMT		Report		Stadium: Gander Green Lane; Attendance: 770; Referee: Sam Purkiss
	Penalties
	Eastmond (penalty scored); Davis (penalty scored); Milsom (penalty scored); Korboa (penalty missed); Olaofe (penalty missed); Goodliffe (penalty scored)		Norris (penalty scored); Reeves (penalty scored); Reid (penalty scored); List (penalty missed); James-Wildin (penalty missed); Osborne (penalty missed)

30 November 2021	Swindon Town	1–2	Colchester United	Swindon
19:45 GMT	Crichlow-Noble 45+1'	Report	Chambers 6', 11'	Stadium: County Ground; Attendance: 1,728; Referee: Ben Toner

1 December 2021	Ipswich Town	2–2 (3–4 p)	Arsenal U21	Ipswich
19:45 GMT	Jackson 31', 43'	Report	Vincent-Young 68' (o.g.); Balogun 71'	Stadium: Portman Road; Attendance: 4,065; Referee: Brett Huxtable
	Penalties
	Evans (penalty scored); Chaplin (penalty scored); Celina (penalty missed); Pigott (penalty missed); Jackson (penalty scored)		Balogun (penalty scored); Oulad M'Hand (penalty scored); Rekik (penalty missed); Biereth (penalty scored); Hutchinson (penalty scored)

7 January 2022	Exeter City	2–3	Portsmouth	Exeter
19:30 GMT	Jay 6'; Collins 76'	Report	Hirst 5'; Curtis 89', 90+3'	Stadium: St James Park; Attendance: 2,146; Referee: Paul Howard
Note: This match was originally scheduled to take place on 21 December 2021. However, the match was rearranged due to circumstances relating to the COVID-19 pandemic.

== Round 3 ==
=== Northern section ===
4 January 2022	Crewe Alexandra	2–4	Rotherham United	Crewe
19:00 GMT	Mandron 11'; Robertson 71'	Report	Sadlier 41'; Smith 57'; Kayode 82'; Ladapo 90+4'	Stadium: Gresty Road; Attendance: 771; Referee: Rebecca Welch

4 January 2022	Harrogate Town	1–0	Carlisle United	Harrogate
19:00 GMT	Armstrong 7'	Report		Stadium: Wetherby Road; Attendance: 928; Referee: David Rock

4 January 2022	Hartlepool United	1–0	Bolton Wanderers	Hartlepool
19:00 GMT	Daly 84'	Report		Stadium: The Suit Direct Stadium; Attendance: 2,529; Referee: Anthony Backhouse

4 January 2022	Oldham Athletic	0–6	Wigan Athletic	Oldham
19:00 GMT		Report	Naylor 28'; Keane 34'; Power 36'; Massey 47'; Edwards 64', 67'	Stadium: Boundary Park; Attendance: 1,831; Referee: Ross Joyce

=== Southern section ===
4 January 2022	Charlton Athletic	1–0	MK Dons	Charlton, London
19:00 GMT	Leko 90+1'	Report		Stadium: The Valley; Attendance: 1,653; Referee: Lee Swabey

4 January 2022	Sutton United	2–1	Colchester United	Sutton, London
19:45 GMT	Turner 7' (o.g.); Wilson 52'	Report	Sears 45'	Stadium: Borough Sports Ground; Attendance: 977; Referee: Charles Breakspear

11 January 2022	Arsenal U21	4–1	Chelsea U21	Holloway, London
19:00 GMT	Olayinka 10'; Biereth 42'; Hutchinson 61'; Flores 67'	Report	Wareham 38'	Stadium: Emirates Stadium; Attendance: 1,610; Referee: James Bell

11 January 2022	Cambridge United	2–1	Portsmouth	Cambridge
19:00 GMT	Knibbs 50', 59'	Report	Jacobs 76'	Stadium: Abbey Stadium; Attendance: 1,308; Referee: Ben Toner

== Quarter-finals ==
The draw for the quarter-final stage took place live on Talksport on 6 January 2022 with games taking place during the week commencing 24 January. From this stage onwards, the competition is no longer split between a northern section and a southern section.

25 January 2022	Hartlepool United	2–2 (5–4 p)	Charlton Athletic	Hartlepool
19:00 GMT	Grey 7'; Molyneux 73'	Report	Burstow 17'; Gilbey 32'	Stadium: The Suit Direct Stadium; Attendance: 3,615; Referee: Sam Barrott
	Penalties
	Cullen (penalty scored); Crawford (penalty scored); Shelton (penalty scored); Molyneux (penalty scored); Sterry (penalty scored)		Washington (penalty scored); Gilbey (penalty scored); Clare (penalty scored); Lee (penalty missed); Aneke (penalty scored)

25 January 2022	Rotherham United	1–1 (7–6 p)	Cambridge United	Rotherham
19:00 GMT	Harding 9'	Report	Digby 40'	Stadium: New York Stadium; Attendance: 2,239; Referee: Martin Coy
	Penalties
	Ferguson (penalty scored); Ladapo (penalty scored); Miller (penalty scored); Wiles (penalty scored); Mattock (penalty scored); Lindsay (penalty scored); Ihiekwe (penalty scored)		Smith (penalty scored); Dunk (penalty scored); Brophy (penalty scored); Williams (penalty scored); Knibbs (penalty scored); Mitov (penalty scored); May (penalty missed)

25 January 2022	Wigan Athletic	1–0	Arsenal U21	Wigan
19:00 GMT	Baningime 83'	Report		Stadium: DW Stadium; Attendance: 3,647; Referee: Ben Toner
Note: Arsenal U21 were originally drawn as the home team. However, the match was then moved to place Wigan Athletic at home.

25 January 2022	Sutton United	1–0	Harrogate Town	Sutton, London
19:45 GMT	Eastmond 80'	Report		Stadium: Borough Sports Ground; Attendance: 1,499; Referee: Christopher Pollard

== Semi-finals ==
The draw for the semi-final stage took place live on Sky Sports on 29 January 2022 with games taking place during the week commencing 6 March.

8 March 2022	Wigan Athletic	1–1 (6–7 p)	Sutton United	Wigan
19.45 GMT	McClean 39'	Report	Randall 29'	Stadium: DW Stadium; Attendance: 6,547; Referee: James Bell
	Penalties
	Power (penalty missed); Shinnie (penalty scored); Keane (penalty scored); McClean (penalty scored); Magennis (penalty scored); Edwards (penalty scored); McGrath (penalty scored); Darikwa (penalty missed)		Eastmond (penalty scored); Beautyman (penalty missed); Milsom (penalty scored); Goodliffe (penalty scored); Bennett (penalty scored); Boldewijn (penalty scored); Bouzanis (penalty scored); John (penalty scored)

9 March 2022	Hartlepool United	2–2 (4–5 p)	Rotherham United	Hartlepool
19.45 GMT	Grey 29'; Molyneux 55'	Report	Smith 50', 63'	Stadium: Victoria Park; Attendance: 7,532; Referee: Bobby Madley
	Penalties
	Featherstone (penalty scored); Sterry (penalty scored); Shelton (penalty scored); Molyneux (penalty missed); Bogle (penalty scored); Crawford (penalty missed)		Smith (penalty scored); Ferguson (penalty scored); Barlaser (penalty scored); Wiles (penalty missed); MacDonald (penalty scored); Miller (penalty scored)

== Final ==
3 April 2022
15:00

Rotherham United	4–2 (a.e.t.)	Sutton United
Wiles 42'; Osei-Tutu 90+6'; Ogbene 96'; Ihiekwe 112'	Report	Wilson 30'; Eastmond 48'

Wembley Stadium, London
Attendance: 30,688
Referee: Seb Stockbridge
