= 2021–22 Plymouth Argyle F.C. season =

English football club season

Plymouth Argyle
2021–22 season
- Chairman: Simon Hallett
- Manager: Ryan Lowe (until 7 December); Steven Schumacher (from 7 December)
- Stadium: Home Park
- League One: 7th
- FA Cup: Fourth round (knocked out by Chelsea
- EFL Cup: Second round
- EFL Trophy: Group stage
- Top goalscorer: League: Ryan Hardie (16); All: Ryan Hardie (19)
Home colours	Away colours

The 2021–22 season is Plymouth Argyle's 136th year in their history and second consecutive season in League One. Along with the league, the club will also compete in the FA Cup, the EFL Cup and the EFL Trophy. The season covers the period from 1 July 2021 to 30 June 2022.

== First-team squad ==
As of 10 May 2021

Note: Flags indicate national team as has been defined under FIFA eligibility rules. Players may hold more than one non-FIFA nationality.

No.	Name	Nat.	Position(s)	Date of birth (age)	Apps.	Goals	Year signed	Signed from	Transfer fee
Goalkeepers
1	Michael Cooper	(England)	GK	8 October 1999 (aged 22)	110	0	2017	Academy	Trainee
23	Luke McCormick	(England)	GK	15 August 1983 (aged 38)	377	0	2020	(England) Swindon Town	Free
25	Callum Burton	(England)	GK	15 August 1996 (aged 25)	4	0	2021	(England) Cambridge United	Free
Defenders
2	James Bolton	(England)	RB/CB	13 August 1994 (aged 27)	14	0	2021	(England) Portsmouth	Undisclosed
3	Macaulay Gillesphey	(England)	CB	24 November 1995 (aged 26)	47	2	2021	(Australia) Brisbane Roar	Free
5	James Wilson	(Wales)	CB	26 February 1989 (aged 33)	49	0	2021	(England) Ipswich Town	Free
6	Dan Scarr	(England)	CB	24 December 1994 (aged 27)	42	2	2021	(England) Walsall	Free
17	Steven Sessegnon	(England)	RB	18 May 2000 (aged 22)	10	0	2021	(England) Fulham	Loan
22	Brendan Galloway	(Zimbabwe)	LB/CB	17 March 1996 (age 30)	16	2	2021	(England) Luton Town	Free
27	Ryan Law	(England)	LB	8 September 1999 (aged 22)	29	2	2018	Academy	Trainee
33	Romoney Crichlow	(England)	CB/LB	3 June 1999 (aged 23)	3	0	2021	(England) Hddersfield Town	Loan
37	Brandon Pursall	(England)	CB	16 March 2004 (aged 18)	2	0	2021	Academy	Trainee
41	Ollie Tomlinson	(England)	CB	19 May 2002 (aged 20)	6	0	2020	Academy	Trainee
Midfielders
4	Jordan Houghton	(England)	DM/CM/CB	5 November 1995 (aged 26)	50	1	2021	(England) Milton Keynes Dons	Free
7	Ryan Broom	(Wales)	RM/CM/AM	4 September 1996 (aged 25)	49	4	2021	(England) Peterborough United	Loan
8	Joe Edwards	(England)	RM/CM/RB	31 October 1990 (aged 31)	136	17	2019	(England) Walsall	Free
10	Danny Mayor	(England)	LM/AM/CM	18 October 1990 (aged 31)	128	6	2019	(England) Bury	Free
15	Conor Grant	(England)	CM/LM/RM	18 April 1995 (aged 27)	126	13	2018	(England) Everton	Free
16	Alfie Lewis	(England)	CM	28 September 1999 (aged 22)	2	0	2022	(Republic of Ireland) St Patrick Athletic	Free
20	Adam Randell	(England)	DM/CB	1 October 2000 (aged 21)	41	1	2018	Academy	Trainee
28	Panutche Camará	(Guinea-Bissau)	AM/CM/SS	28 February 1997 (aged 25)	94	10	2020	(England) Crawley Town	Free
32	George Cooper	(England)	LW/RW/AM	30 October 1996 (aged 25)	51	6	2020	(England) Peterborough United	Undisclosed
Forwards
9	Ryan Hardie	(Scotland)	CF/RW/LW	17 March 1997 (aged 25)	108	32	2021	(England) Blackpool	Undisclosed
11	Niall Ennis	(England)	CF/LW	20 May 1999 (aged 23)	51	10	2021	(England) Wolverhampton Wanderers	Undisclosed
14	Jordon Garrick	(Jamaica)	RW/LW/CF	15 June 1998 (aged 24)	49	7	2021	(England) Swansea City	Loan
31	Luke Jephcott	(Wales)	CF/RW/LW	26 January 2000 (aged 22)	114	37	2018	Academy	Trainee

=== Statistics ===
As of game played on 30 April 2022

No.	Pos	Nat	Player	Total		League One		FA Cup		EFL Cup		EFL Trophy	
No.	Pos	Nat	Player	Apps	Goals	Apps	Goals	Apps	Goals	Apps	Goals	Apps	Goals
1	GK	(England) ENG	Michael Cooper	52	0	46+0	0	5+0	0	1+0	0	0+0	0
2	DF	(England) ENG	James Bolton	14	0	12+1	0	1+0	0	0+0	0	0+0	0
3	DF	(England) ENG	Macaulay Gillesphey	50	2	38+4	1	4+0	1	1+0	0	3+0	0
4	MF	(England) ENG	Jordan Houghton	51	1	43+0	1	5+0	0	1+1	0	1+0	0
5	DF	(Wales) WAL	James Wilson	49	0	42+0	0	4+0	0	1+0	0	2+0	0
6	DF	(England) ENG	Dan Scarr	38	1	31+0	1	5+0	0	2+0	0	0+0	0
7	MF	(Wales) WAL	Ryan Broom	48	4	29+14	4	2+2	0	1+0	0	0+0	0
8	MF	(England) ENG	Joe Edwards	49	5	38+3	5	5+0	0	2+0	0	1+0	0
9	FW	(Scotland) SCO	Ryan Hardie	45	18	34+3	15	4+1	1	2+0	2	0+1	0
10	MF	(England) ENG	Danny Mayor	41	3	26+7	3	4+1	0	1+0	0	2+0	0
11	FW	(England) ENG	Niall Ennis	28	4	12+13	4	0+3	0	0+0	0	0+0	0
14	FW	(Jamaica) JAM	Jordan Garrick*	49	7	18+23	4	4+1	3	0+0	0	2+1	0
15	MF	(England) ENG	Conor Grant	43	7	37+1	7	4+0	0	1+0	0	0+0	0
16	MF	(England) ENG	Alfie Lewis	2	0	0+1	0	0+1	0	0+0	0	0+0	0
17	DF	(England) ENG	Steven Sessegnon*	10	0	6+4	0	0+0	0	0+0	0	0+0	0
18	FW	(England) ENG	Kieran Agard	16	3	3+9	1	0+2	0	0+0	0	2+0	2
20	MF	(England) ENG	Adam Randell	31	1	8+16	1	1+2	0	1+1	0	2+0	0
22	DF	(Zimbabwe) ZIM	Brendan Galloway	16	2	12+2	2	1+0	0	1+0	0	0+0	0
25	GK	(England) ENG	Callum Burton	4	0	0+0	0	0+0	0	1+0	0	3+0	0
27	DF	(England) ENG	Ryan Law	21	2	4+9	1	0+3	1	1+1	0	3+0	0
28	MF	(Guinea-Bissau) GBS	Panutche Camará	47	5	36+4	4	3+1	0	2+0	1	1+0	0
31	FW	(Wales) WAL	Luke Jephcott	45	12	27+13	10	2+1	1	2+0	1	0+0	0
32	MF	(England) ENG	George Cooper	3	0	0+1	0	1+0	0	0+1	0	0+0	0
33	DF	(England) ENG	Romoney Crichlow*	3	0	1+2	0	0+0	0	0+0	0	0+0	0
36	DF	(England) ENG	Finley Craske	2	0	0+0	0	0+0	0	0+0	0	1+1	0
37	DF	(England) ENG	Brandon Pursall	2	0	0+0	0	0+0	0	0+0	0	2+0	0
39	MF	(England) ENG	Carlo Garside	2	0	0+0	0	0+0	0	0+0	0	0+2	0
41	DF	(England) ENG	Ollie Tomlinson	4	0	0+0	0	0+0	0	1+0	0	3+0	0
42	FW	(England) ENG	Rhys Shirley	9	1	0+3	0	0+1	0	0+2	1	3+0	0
44	MF	(Wales) WAL	Will Jenkins-Davies	4	0	0+1	0	0+0	0	0+0	0	1+2	0
45	FW	(England) ENG	Oscar Massey	1	0	0+0	0	0+0	0	0+0	0	1+0	0
48	MF	(England) ENG	Frederick Issaka	1	0	0+0	0	0+0	0	0+0	0	0+1	0
49	MF	(England) ENG	Caleb Roberts	1	0	0+0	0	0+0	0	0+0	0	0+1	0

=== Goals record ===
As of 30 April 2022

Rank	No.	Nat.	Po.	Name	League One	FA Cup	EFL Cup	EFL Trophy	Total
1	9	(Scotland)	CF	Ryan Hardie	16	1	2	0	19
2	31	(Wales)	CF	Luke Jephcott	10	1	1	0	12
3	14	(Jamaica)	RW	Jordan Garrick	4	3	0	0	7
3	15	(England)	CM	Conor Grant	7	0	0	0	7
5	8	(England)	RM	Joe Edwards	5	0	0	0	5
5	28	(Guinea-Bissau)	AM	Panutche Camará	4	0	1	0	5
7	7	(Wales)	RM	Ryan Broom	4	0	0	0	4
7	11	(England)	CF	Niall Ennis	4	0	0	0	4
9	10	(England)	LM	Danny Mayor	3	0	0	0	3
9	~~18~~	(England)	CF	Kieran Agard	1	0	0	2	3
11	3	(England)	CB	Macauley Gillesphey	1	1	0	0	2
11	6	(England)	CB	Dan Scarr	2	0	0	0	2
11	22	(Zimbabwe)	LB	Brendan Galloway	2	0	0	0	2
11	27	(England)	LB	Ryan Law	1	1	0	0	2
15	4	(England)	DM	Jordan Houghton	1	0	0	0	1
15	20	(England)	CM	Adam Randell	1	0	0	0	1
15	42	(England)	CF	Rhys Shirley	0	0	1	0	1
Own Goals					2	0	0	0	2
Total					67	7	5	2	81

=== Disciplinary record ===
As of 30 April 2022

Rank	No.	Nat.	Po.	Name	League One			FA Cup			EFL Cup			EFL Trophy			Total		
Rank	No.	Nat.	Po.	Name	Booked	(yellow card) (yellow-red card)	Sent off (straight red)	Booked	(yellow card) (yellow-red card)	Sent off (straight red)	Booked	(yellow card) (yellow-red card)	Sent off (straight red)	Booked	(yellow card) (yellow-red card)	Sent off (straight red)	Booked	(yellow card) (yellow-red card)	Sent off (straight red)
1	4	(England)	DM	Jordan Houghton	11	0	1	2	0	0	0	0	0	0	0	0	13	0	1
2	5	(Wales)	CB	James Wilson	6	0	0	1	0	0	0	0	0	0	0	0	7	0	0
3	1	(England)	GK	Michael Cooper	4	0	0	1	0	0	0	0	0	0	0	0	5	0	0
3	6	(England)	CB	Dan Scarr	5	0	0	0	0	0	0	0	0	0	0	0	5	0	0
3	8	(England)	RM	Joe Edwards	5	0	0	0	0	0	0	0	0	0	0	0	5	0	0
3	14	(Jamaica)	RW	Jordan Garrick	5	0	0	0	0	0	0	0	0	0	0	0	5	0	0
3	22	(Zimbabwe)	LB	Brendan Galloway	4	0	0	0	0	0	1	0	0	0	0	0	5	0	0
8	7	(Wales)	RM	Ryan Broom	4	0	0	0	0	0	0	0	0	0	0	0	4	0	0
8	28	(Guinea-Bissau)	AM	Panutche Camará	4	0	0	0	0	0	0	0	0	0	0	0	4	0	0
10	17	(England)	RB	Steven Sessegnon	3	0	0	0	0	0	0	0	0	0	0	0	3	0	0
11	2	(England)	RB	James Bolton	2	0	0	0	0	0	0	0	0	0	0	0	2	0	0
11	9	(Scotland)	CF	Ryan Hardie	2	0	0	0	0	0	0	0	0	0	0	0	2	0	0
11	10	(England)	LM	Danny Mayor	2	0	0	0	0	0	0	0	0	0	0	0	2	0	0
11	15	(England)	CM	Conor Grant	2	0	0	0	0	0	0	0	0	0	0	0	2	0	0
11	20	(England)	CM	Adam Randell	1	0	0	0	0	0	0	0	0	1	0	0	2	0	0
16	3	(England)	CB	Macaulay Gillesphey	1	0	0	0	0	0	0	0	0	0	0	0	1	0	0
16	27	(England)	LB	Ryan Law	0	0	0	1	0	0	0	0	0	0	0	0	1	0	0
16	33	(England)	CB	Romoney Crichlow	1	0	0	0	0	0	0	0	0	0	0	0	1	0	0
16	39	(England)	MD	Carlo Garside	0	0	0	0	0	0	0	0	0	1	0	0	1	0	0
16	41	(England)	CB	Ollie Tomlinson	0	0	0	0	0	0	0	0	0	1	0	0	1	0	0
16	44	(Wales)	MF	Will Jenkins-Davies	0	0	0	0	0	0	0	0	0	1	0	0	1	0	0
Total					73	0	1	5	0	0	1	0	0	4	0	0	83	0	1

== Pre-season friendlies ==
Plymouth Argyle announced they will play friendlies against Plymouth Parkway, Bristol Rovers, Swansea City, Middlesbrough, Tavistock, Bristol City and Torquay United as part of their pre-season schedule.

3 July 2021 Friendly	Plymouth Parkway	1–5	Plymouth Argyle	Plymouth
15:00 BST	Allen 77' (pen.)	Report	Galloway 30'; Hardie 49' (pen.); Jephcott 53'; Camará 70'; Rutherford 85'	Stadium: Bolitho Park

14 July 2021 Friendly	Saltash United	0–7	Plymouth Argyle	Saltash
19:00 BST		Report	Ennis 28', 53'; Grant 42'; Camará 51'; Hardie 74', 84'; Shirley 86'	Stadium: Kimberley Stadium; Attendance: 600; Referee: Marc Whalley

17 July 2021 Friendly	Bristol Rovers	1–1	Plymouth Argyle	Horfield
13:00 BST	Collins 47' (pen.)	Report	Jephcott 35' (pen.)	Stadium: Memorial Stadium; Referee: Kevin Johnson

20 July 2021 Friendly	Plymouth Argyle	1–2	Swansea City	Plymouth
19:00 BST	Hardie 47'	Report	Naughton 23'; Cullen 33'	Stadium: Home Park; Attendance: 3,391; Referee: Lee Swabey

23 July 2021 Friendly	Plymouth Argyle	1–2	Middlesbrough	Plymouth
19:00 BST	Gillesphey 55'	Report	Crooks 17'; Tavernier 68'	Stadium: Home Park; Attendance: 4,204; Referee: Brett Huxtable

24 July 2021 Friendly	Tavistock	0–0	Plymouth Argyle	Tavistock
15:00 BST		Report		Stadium: Langsford Park; Referee: Mark Senior

27 July 2021 Friendly	Plymouth Argyle	0–1	Bristol City	Plymouth
18:00 BST		Report	Weimann 55'	Stadium: Home Park; Attendance: 4,286; Referee: Scott Jackson

31 July 2021 Friendly	Torquay United	0–3	Plymouth Argyle	Torquay
15:00 BST		Report	Ennis 42'; Camará 45+2'; Hardie 82'	Stadium: Plainmoor; Attendance: 2,356; Referee: Brett Huxtable

== Competitions ==
=== League One ===
==== League table ====
Pos	Team	Pld	W	D	L	GF	GA	GD	Pts	Promotion, qualification or relegation
3	Milton Keynes Dons	46	26	11	9	78	44	+34	89	Qualification for League One play-offs
4	Sheffield Wednesday	46	24	13	9	78	50	+28	85	Qualification for League One play-offs
5	Sunderland (O, P)	46	24	12	10	79	53	+26	84	Qualification for League One play-offs
6	Wycombe Wanderers	46	23	14	9	75	51	+24	83	Qualification for League One play-offs
7	Plymouth Argyle	46	23	11	12	68	48	+20	80	
8	Oxford United	46	22	10	14	82	59	+23	76	
9	Bolton Wanderers	46	21	10	15	74	57	+17	73	
10	Portsmouth	46	20	13	13	68	51	+17	73	
11	Ipswich Town	46	18	16	12	67	46	+21	70	

Source: EFL Official Website
Rules for classification: 1) Points; 2) Goal difference; 3) Number of goals scored; 4) Head-to-head results; 5) Wins; 6) Away goals; 7) Penalty points based on yellow and red cards received excluding the last four games of the season (sec 9.5); 8) 12-point sending off offences; 9) If the tie affects the automatic promotion or relegation places, a play-off game or games would be held between the two tied teams
(O) Play-off winners; (P) Promoted

==== Results summary ====
Overall								Home						Away					
Pld	W	D	L	GF	GA	GD	Pts	W	D	L	GF	GA	GD	W	D	L	GF	GA	GD
46	23	11	12	68	48	+20	80	14	4	5	32	19	+13	9	7	7	36	29	+7

Last updated: 30 April 2022.

==== Results by matchday ====
Matchday	1	2	3	4	5	6	7	8	9	10	11	12	13	14	15	16	17	18	19	20	21	22	23	24	25	26	27	28	29	30	31	32	33	34	35	36	37	38	39	40	41	42	43	44	45	46
Ground	A	H	H	A	H	H	A	A	H	H	A	H	A	H	A	H	A	A	H	H	A	A	H	A	A	H	A	A	A	H	A	A	H	H	H	A	H	H	H	A	H	A	A	H	A	H
Result	L	W	D	W	D	W	W	D	W	D	D	W	W	W	D	W	W	L	L	L	D	L	W	W	L	L	D	W	W	W	W	L	L	W	W	W	W	W	W	L	W	D	L	D	D	L
Position	24	13	16	8	12	8	4	4	4	4	3	1	1	1	1	1	1	1	3	4	5	6	5	4	7	7	7	7	8	6	5	5	7	8	6	6	5	4	4	4	4	4	4	4	5	7

Updated to match(es) played on 30 April 2022. Source: Statto.com
A = Away; H = Home; W = Win; D = Draw; L = Loss

==== Matches ====
Plymouth's fixtures were announced on 24 June 2021.

7 August 2021 1	Rotherham United	2–0	Plymouth Argyle	Rotherham
15:00 BST	Ladapo 10'; Wiles 38'; Barlaser (yellow card) 49'; Lindsay (yellow card) 66'	Report		Stadium: AESSEAL New York Stadium; Attendance: 9,417; Referee: Seb Stockbridge

14 August 2021 2	Plymouth Argyle	1–0	Gillingham	Plymouth
15:00 BST	Jephcott 88'; Houghton (yellow card) 90+5'	Report	O'Keefe (yellow card) 44'; Tucker (yellow card) 62'	Stadium: Home Park; Attendance: 10,854; Referee: Charles Breakspear

17 August 2021 3	Plymouth Argyle	1–1	Cambridge United	Plymouth
19:45 BST	Wilson (yellow card) 6'; Jephcott 68'; Edwards (yellow card) 86'	Report	Williams (yellow card) 6'; May (yellow card) 57'; Brophy (yellow card) 72'; Ironside (penalty missed) 76', 76'; O'Neil (yellow card) 79'; Digby (yellow card) 90+1'	Stadium: Home Park; Attendance: 10,532; Referee: Chris Sarginson

21 August 2021 4	Shrewsbury Town	0–3	Plymouth Argyle	Shrewsbury
15:00 BST	Leahy (yellow card) 39'; Vela (yellow card) 77'	Report	Hardie 24', 65'; Broom (yellow card) 40'; Jephcott 50'	Stadium: Montgomery Waters Meadow; Attendance: 5,737; Referee: Paul Howard

28 August 2021 5	Plymouth Argyle	1–1	Fleetwood Town	Plymouth
15:00 BST	Hardie 21'	Report	Camps 35'; Johnson (yellow card) 42'; Clarke (yellow card) 73'	Stadium: Home Park; Attendance: 10,453; Referee: Sam Purkiss

11 September 2021 6	Plymouth Argyle	3–0	Sheffield Wednesday	Plymouth
15:00 BST	Edwards 7'; Scarr 40'; Houghton (yellow card) 80'; Law 90+7'	Report	Hutchinson (yellow card) 25'; Byers (yellow card) 40'; Sow (yellow card) 55'; Gregory (yellow card) 80'	Stadium: Home Park; Attendance: 13,448; Referee: Ben Speedie

18 September 2021 7	AFC Wimbledon	0–1	Plymouth Argyle	Wimbledon
15:00 BST	Chislett (yellow card) 14'; McCormick (yellow card) 60'	Report	Hardie 47', (yellow card) 88'; Cooper (yellow card) 68'	Stadium: Plough Lane; Referee: Tom Nield

21 September 2021 8	Portsmouth	2–2	Plymouth Argyle	Milton
19:45 BST	Brown 6'; Raggett (yellow card) 19', (goal) 90+5'; Curtis (yellow card) 24'; Harness (yellow card) 32'	Report	Grant (yellow card) 4'; Edwards (yellow card) 32'; Houghton (yellow card) 45+1'; Hardie 48', 80'	Stadium: Fratton Park; Attendance: 13,375; Referee: Carl Brook

25 September 2021 9	Plymouth Argyle	2–1	Doncaster Rovers	Plymouth
15:00 BST	Galloway (yellow card) 45+1'; Houghton (yellow card) 51'; Jephcott 68' (pen.); Grant 90+2' (pen.); Garrick (yellow card) 90+7'; Cooper (yellow card) 90+8'	Report	Smith (yellow card) 30'; Hiwula 54'; Cukur (yellow card) 57'; Rowe (yellow card) 80'; Galbraith (yellow card) 83'; Barlow (yellow card) 89'	Stadium: Home Park; Attendance: 11,033; Referee: Trevor Kettle

28 September 2021 10	Plymouth Argyle	1–1	Crewe Alexandra	Plymouth
19:45 BST	Wilson (yellow card) 33'; Houghton (yellow card) 64'; Hardie 72'; Galloway (yellow card) 77'	Report	Kashket 3'; Johnson (yellow card) 62'; Offord (yellow card) 70'; Robertson (yellow card) 90'	Stadium: Home Park; Attendance: 11,138; Referee: Neil Hair

2 October 2021 11	Lincoln City	2–2	Plymouth Argyle	Lincoln
15:00 BST	Bishop (yellow card) 36'; Nlundulu (yellow card) 45+4'; Sørensen 66'; Maguire (yellow card) 80'; Scully 90' (pen.), (yellow card) 90+2'	Report	Hardie 25'; Galloway 74'; Scarr (yellow card) 90'; Edwards (yellow card) 90+2'	Stadium: LNER Stadium; Attendance: 8,375; Referee: Andy Woolmer

9 October 2021 12	Plymouth Argyle	2–1	Burton Albion	Plymouth
15:00 BST	Grant 15'; Broom 43'; Scarr (yellow card) 60'	Report	Akins 59'	Stadium: Home Park; Attendance: 11,915; Referee: Antony Coggins

16 October 2021 13	Oxford United	1–3	Plymouth Argyle	Oxford
15:00 BST	Taylor 5'	Report	Garrick 11'; Scarr (yellow card) 31'; Camará 39', 84'	Stadium: The Kassam Stadium; Attendance: 8,877; Referee: James Bell

19 October 2021 14	Plymouth Argyle	3–0	Bolton Wanderers	Plymouth
19:45 GMT	Galloway 6', (yellow card) 90+1'; Grant 15'; Broom 90+4'	Report	Bakayoko (yellow card) 12'; Afolayan (yellow card) 50'; Lee (yellow card) 54'	Stadium: Home Park; Attendance: 12,813; Referee: Keith Stroud

23 October 2021 15	Morecambe	1–1	Plymouth Argyle	Morecambe
15:00 BST	Ayunga 6'; Jones (yellow card) 65'	Report	Mayor 12'; Houghton (yellow card) 79'; Galloway (yellow card) 84'	Stadium: Mazuma Stadium; Attendance: 4,272; Referee: Marc Edwards

30 October 2021 16	Plymouth Argyle	2–1	Ipswich Town	Plymouth
15:00 BST	Jephcott 44'; Grant 50'; Garrick (yellow card) 75'	Report	Edmundson 14', (yellow card) 22'; Chaplin (yellow card) 26'; Morsy (yellow card) 56'; Nsiala (yellow card) 75'	Stadium: Home Park; Attendance: 16,087; Referee: Robert Lewis

13 November 2021 17	Accrington Stanley	1–4	Plymouth Argyle	Accrington
15:00 GMT	Leigh 50', (yellow card) 54'; Conneely (yellow card) 72'	Report	Hamilton 23' (o.g.); Houghton 44'; Broom 63'; Hardie 76'; Garrick (yellow card) 79'; Grant (yellow card) 84'	Stadium: Wham Stadium; Attendance: 3,130; Referee: David Rock

20 November 2021 18	Charlton Athletic	2–0	Plymouth Argyle	Charlton
15:00 GMT	Dobson (yellow card) 26'; Purrington 61'; Washington 84'	Report	Gillesphey (yellow card) 21'; Broom (yellow card) 51'	Stadium: The Valley; Attendance: 26,090; Referee: Christopher Pollard

23 November 2021 19	Plymouth Argyle	0–3	Wycombe Wanderers	Plymouth
19:45 GMT	Mayor (yellow card) 25'; Houghton (yellow card) 90+7'	Report	Wheeler (yellow card) 16'; Jacobson (yellow card) 52'; Vokes 62'; Pendlebury (yellow card) 81'; Mehmeti 84', 90'; Stewart (yellow card) 90+4'	Stadium: Home Park; Attendance: 12,833; Referee: Alan Young

27 November 2021 20	Plymouth Argyle	1–2	Wigan Athletic	Plymouth
15:00 GMT	Mayor 43'; Camará (yellow card) 73'	Report	Keane 35'; Naylor (yellow card) 86'; Lang 90'	Stadium: Home Park; Attendance: 15,329; Referee: Andy Woolmer

8 December 2021 21	Milton Keynes Dons	1–1	Plymouth Argyle	Denbigh
19:45 GMT	Watson 21'	Report	Houghton (yellow card) 53'; Grant 66'; Wilson (yellow card) 73'	Stadium: Stadium MK; Attendance: 7,566; Referee: Sam Barrott

11 December 2021 22	Sunderland	2–1	Plymouth Argyle	Sunderland
15:00 GMT	Neil 4'; Broadhead 13'; Winchester (yellow card) 45+1'; Stewart (yellow card) 54'; Wright (yellow card) 78'; O'Brien (yellow card) 81'	Report	Edwards (yellow card) 22'; Scarr 64'; Houghton (yellow card) 85'	Stadium: Stadium of Light; Attendance: 28,987; Referee: Scott Oldham

18 December 2021 23	Plymouth Argyle	1–0	Charlton Athletic	Plymouth
15:00 GMT	Agard 45+2'; Broom (yellow card) 90'	Report	Gilbey (yellow card) 26'	Stadium: Home Park; Attendance: 12,711; Referee: Craig Hicks

26 December 2021 24	Cheltenham Town	0–2	Plymouth Argyle	Cheltenham
15:00 GMT	Crowley (yellow card) 82'	Report	Camará 42'; Garrick 75'	Stadium: Jonny-Rocks Stadium; Attendance: 5,703; Referee: Tom Reeves

15 January 2022 25	Sheffield Wednesday	4–2	Plymouth Argyle	Owlerton
15:00 GMT	Sow 19'; Mendez-Laing 40'; Luongo (yellow card) 56'; Hutchinson 79'; Windass 84'; Hunt (yellow card) 88'	Report	Randell 46'; Johnson 83' (o.g.); Broom (yellow card) 90+6'	Stadium: Hillsborough; Attendance: 20,872; Referee: Christopher Pollard

22 January 2022 26	Plymouth Argyle	1–2	Lincoln City	Plymouth
15:00 GMT	Jephcott 34'; Garrick (yellow card) 90+4'	Report	Marquis 51'; Bramall (yellow card) 62'; Bishop (yellow card) 82'; Cullen (yellow card) 88'; Melbourne 90+2'; McGrandles (yellow card) 90+4'	Stadium: Home Park; Attendance: 12,269; Referee: Neil Hair

25 January 2022 27	Fleetwood Town	3–3	Plymouth Argyle	Fleetwood
19:45 GMT	Lane 24'; Jules (yellow card) 78'; Harrison 89'; Pilkington 90+2'	Report	Jephcott 30'; Edwards 49'; Ennis 75'; Garrick (yellow card) 78'	Stadium: Highbury Stadium; Attendance: 2,584; Referee: Marc Edwards

29 January 2022 28	Doncaster Rovers	1–3	Plymouth Argyle	Doncaster
15:00 GMT	Horton 17'; Younger (yellow card) 82'; Rowe (yellow card) 90+4'	Report	Jephcott 23'; Wilson (yellow card) 37'; Edwards 63'; Garrick 79'	Stadium: Keepmoat Stadium; Attendance: 6,493; Referee: Martin Coy

8 February 2022 29	Crewe Alexandra	1–4	Plymouth Argyle	Crewe
19:45 GMT	Long 19'; Agyei (yellow card) 76'	Report	Scarr (yellow card) 13'; Randell (penalty missed) 23'; Hardie 48', 56', (yellow card) 68', (goal) 85'; Ennis 55'	Stadium: Mornflake Stadium; Attendance: 3,874; Referee: John Busby

12 February 2022 30	Plymouth Argyle	1–0	Shrewsbury Town	Plymouth
15:00 GMT	Houghton (yellow card) 32'; Camará (yellow card) 54'; Grant 62'; Bolton (yellow card) 80'	Report	Vela (yellow card) 34'	Stadium: Home Park; Attendance: 14,714; Referee: James Oldham

19 February 2022 31	Gillingham	0–2	Plymouth Argyle	Gillingham
15:00 GMT	Lee (yellow card) 61'	Report	Wilson (yellow card) 30'; Garrick 46'; Jephcott 76' (pen.)	Stadium: Priestfield; Attendance: 5,197; Referee: Paul Howard

22 February 2022 32	Cambridge United	2–0	Plymouth Argyle	Cambridge
19:45 GMT	Smith 7'; Lankester 43'; Okedina (yellow card) 57'; Williams (yellow card) 61'	Report	Randell (yellow card) 43'; Bolton (yellow card) 52'	Stadium: Abbey Stadium; Attendance: 5,286; Referee: Bobby Madley

26 February 2022 33	Plymouth Argyle	0–1	Rotherham United	Plymouth
15:00 GMT	Camará (yellow card) 26'; Edwards (yellow card) 29'	Report	Barlaser (yellow card) 25'; Smith 63'; Rathbone (yellow card) 82'	Stadium: Home Park; Attendance: 14,193; Referee: Will Finnie

5 March 2022 34	Plymouth Argyle	2–0	Morecambe	Plymouth
15:00 GMT	Grant 14'; Hardie 43'	Report	Connolly (yellow card) 34'; O'Connor (yellow card) 59'	Stadium: Home Park; Attendance: 12,228; Referee: Alan Young

8 March 2022 35	Plymouth Argyle	2–0	AFC Wimbledon	Plymouth
19:45 GMT	Hardie 29'; Mayor (yellow card) 32'; Broom 61'; Sessegnon (yellow card) 90+3'	Report		Stadium: Home Park; Referee: Sam Allison

12 March 2022 36	Bolton Wanderers	0–1	Plymouth Argyle	Horwich
15:00 GMT		Report	Gillesphey 43'	Stadium: University of Bolton Stadium; Attendance: 16,078; Referee: Robert Lewis

15 March 2022 37	Plymouth Argyle	1–0	Portsmouth	Plymouth
19:45 GMT	Sessegnon (yellow card) 43'; Hardie 65'; Cooper (yellow card) 90+5'	Report	Romeo (yellow card) 33'; Thompson (yellow card) 34'	Stadium: Home Park; Attendance: 15,604; Referee: Sam Purkiss

19 March 2022 38	Plymouth Argyle	4–0	Accrington Stanley	Plymouth
15:00 GMT	Camará 12', (yellow card) 62'; Edwards 37'; Ennis 64'; Hardie 79'	Report	Butcher (yellow card) 31'; Savin (red card) 68'	Stadium: Home Park; Attendance: 13,076; Referee: Charles Breakspear

22 March 2022 39	Plymouth Argyle	2–0	Cheltenham Town	Plymouth
19:45 GMT	Ennis 14'; Mayor 42'	Report	Colkett (yellow card) 90'	Stadium: Home Park; Referee: Christopher Pollard

26 March 2022 40	Ipswich Town	1–0	Plymouth Argyle	Ipswich
15:00 GMT	Morsy (yellow card) 28', (goal) 37'; Burns (yellow card) 63'	Report	Crichlow (yellow card) 76'	Stadium: Portman Road; Attendance: 23,256; Referee: David Rock

2 April 2022 41	Plymouth Argyle	1–0	Oxford United	Plymouth
15:00 BST	Edwards 56'; Cooper (yellow card) 90+4'	Report	Brown (yellow card) 45+1'; Bodin (yellow card) 76'; Taylor (yellow card) 82'	Stadium: Home Park; Attendance: 15,826; Referee: Ollie Yates

9 April 2022 42	Burton Albion	0–0	Plymouth Argyle	Burton upon Trent
15:00 BST	Powell (yellow card) 84'; Maddox (yellow card) 88'	Report	Houghton (yellow card) 82'	Stadium: Pirelli Stadium; Attendance: 3,938; Referee: Leigh Doughty

15 April 2022 43	Wycombe Wanderers	2–0	Plymouth Argyle	High Wycombe
15:00 BST	McCleary 14', 31'; Scowen (yellow card) 45+4'; Stockdale (yellow card) 90+1'	Report		Stadium: Adams Park; Attendance: 8,181; Referee: Darren Drysdale

18 April 2022 44	Plymouth Argyle	0–0	Sunderland	Plymouth
15:00 BST	Sessegnon (yellow card) 90+2'	Report	Cirkin (yellow card) 59'; Evans (yellow card) 84'	Stadium: Home Park; Attendance: 15,800; Referee: Carl Brook

23 April 2022 45	Wigan Athletic	1–1	Plymouth Argyle	Wigan
15:00 BST	Bennett (yellow card) 62'; Whatmough 74'; Pearce (yellow card) 79'; Keane (yellow card) 80'	Report	Houghton (yellow card) 58'; Jephcott 63'	Stadium: DW Stadium; Attendance: 14,130; Referee: Seb Stockbridge

30 April 2022 46	Plymouth Argyle	0–5	Milton Keynes Dons	Plymouth
12:30 BST	Wilson (yellow card) 32'; Houghton (yellow card) 42' (yellow-red card) 45+2'	Report	Twine 17', 40', 60', 77'; Darling 43'	Stadium: Home Park; Attendance: 15,644; Referee: Craig Hicks

=== FA Cup ===
Argyle were drawn away to Sheffield Wednesday in the first round, Rochdale in the second round, Birmingham City in the third round and Chelsea in the fourth round.

7 November 2021 First round	Sheffield Wednesday	0–0	Plymouth Argyle	Owlerton
12:15 GMT	Wing (yellow card) 71'	Report		Stadium: Hillsborough; Attendance: 7,261; Referee: Anthony Backhouse

16 November 2021 First round replay	Plymouth Argyle	3–0	Sheffield Wednesday	Plymouth
19:45 GMT	Garrick 20', 67'; Hardie 36'	Report	Brown (yellow card) 56'; Wildsmith (yellow card) 68'	Stadium: Home Park; Attendance: 11,094; Referee: Chris Sarginson

5 December 2021 Second round	Rochdale	1–2	Plymouth Argyle	Spotland
12:15 GMT	Morley 55'	Report	Garrick 17'; Wilson (yellow card) 37'; Law (yellow card) 64'; Houghton (yellow card) 77'; Jephcott 86'	Stadium: Crown Oil Arena; Referee: Andrew Kitchen

8 January 2022 Third round	Birmingham City	0–1 (a.e.t.)	Plymouth Argyle	Bordesley
17:30 GMT	Woods (yellow card) 28'; Friend (yellow card) 58' (yellow-red card) 68'; Aneke (yellow card) 90+6'	Report	Houghton (yellow card) 55'; Law 104'	Stadium: St Andrew's; Referee: Rebecca Welch

5 February 2022 Fourth round	Chelsea	2–1 (a.e.t.)	Plymouth Argyle	Fulham
12:30 GMT	Jorginho (yellow card) 19'; Azpilicueta 41'; Alonso 105+1'; Havertz (yellow card) 120+1'	Report	Gillesphey 8'; Cooper (yellow card) 102'; Hardie (penalty missed) 117'	Stadium: Stamford Bridge; Referee: Simon Hooper

=== EFL Cup ===
Argyle were drawn away to Peterborough United in the first round and Swansea City in the second round.

10 August 2021 First round	Peterborough United	0–4	Plymouth Argyle	Peterborough
19:45 BST		Report	Hardie 23', 33'; Galloway (yellow card) 61'; Jephcott 66'; Camará 84'	Stadium: Weston Homes Stadium; Attendance: 4,021; Referee: Ben Toner

24 August 2021 Second round	Swansea City	4–1	Plymouth Argyle	Landore
19:00 BST	Williams 29'; Manning (yellow card) 39'; Bennett (yellow card) 51'; Whittaker 79', 86', 90'	Report	Shirley 63'	Stadium: Swansea.com Stadium; Attendance: 17,491; Referee: Bobby Madley

=== EFL Trophy ===
Argyle were drawn into Southern Group F with Arsenal U21s, Newport County and Swindon Town. The group stage fixtures were confirmed on 3 August.

Pos	Div	Team	Pld	W	PW	PL	L	GF	GA	GD	Pts	Qualification
1	L2	Swindon Town	3	3	0	0	0	6	2	+4	9	Advance to Round 2
2	ACA	Arsenal U21	3	1	0	1	1	6	6	0	4	Advance to Round 2
3	L2	Newport County	3	1	0	0	2	5	5	0	3	
4	L1	Plymouth Argyle	3	0	1	0	2	2	6	−4	2	

Source: EFL.com

31 August 2021 Group game 1	Newport County	2–0	Plymouth Argyle	Newport
19:00 BST	Telford 58'; Bright (yellow card) 66'; Livermore (yellow card) 68'; Lewis (yellow card) 70'; Abraham 84'	Report	Randell (yellow card) 34'; Jenkins-Davies (yellow card) 78'	Stadium: Rodney Parade; Attendance: 1,032; Referee: Tom Reeves

12 October 2021 Group game 2	Plymouth Argyle	1–3	Swindon Town	Plymouth
19:00 BST	Agard 24'; Tomlinson (yellow card) 90+2'	Report	Gillesphey 20' (o.g.); Baudry (yellow card) 29'; Mitchell-Lawson 74'; McKirdy 84'	Stadium: Home Park; Referee: Sam Allison

16 November 2021 Group game 3	Plymouth Argyle	1–1 (5–4 p)	Arsenal U21	Plymouth
19:45 GMT	Agard 24'; Garside (yellow card) 71'	Report	Balogun 56'; Rekik (yellow card) 64'	Stadium: Home Park; Attendance: 1,795; Referee: Will Finnie
	Penalties
	Gillesphey (penalty scored); Craske (penalty scored); Pursall (penalty scored); Agard (penalty scored); Jenkins-Davies (penalty missed); Shirley (penalty scored)		Balogun (penalty scored); Biereth (penalty scored); Swanson (penalty scored); Norton-Cuffy (penalty missed); Taylor-Hart (penalty scored); Olayinka (penalty missed)

== Transfers ==
=== Transfers in ===
Date	Position	Nationality	Name	From	Fee	Ref.
24 June 2021	RB	(England)	James Bolton	(England) Portsmouth	Undisclosed	
1 July 2021	GK	(England)	Callum Burton	(England) Cambridge United	Free transfer	
1 July 2021	CB	(England)	Macaulay Gillesphey	(Australia) Brisbane Roar	Free transfer	
1 July 2021	DM	(England)	Jordan Houghton	(England) Milton Keynes Dons	Free transfer	
1 July 2021	CB	(England)	Dan Scarr	(England) Walsall	Free transfer	
1 July 2021	CB	(Wales)	James Wilson	(England) Ipswich Town	Free transfer	
21 July 2021	LB	(Zimbabwe)	Brendan Galloway	(England) Luton Town	Free transfer	
10 September 2021	CF	(England)	Kieran Agard	(England) Milton Keynes Dons	Free transfer	
5 October 2021	CF	(Wales)	Freddie Issaka	(England) Truro City	Undisclosed	
5 January 2022	CM	(England)	Alfie Lewis	(Republic of Ireland) St Patrick's Athletic	Free transfer	

=== Loans in ===
Date from	Position	Nationality	Name	From	Date until	Ref.
29 July 2021	RM	(Wales)	Ryan Broom	(England) Peterborough United	End of season	
19 August 2021	RW	(Jamaica)	Jordon Garrick	(Wales) Swansea City	End of season	
13 January 2022	CB	(England)	Romoney Crichlow	(England) Huddersfield Town	End of season	
31 January 2022	RB	(England)	Steven Sessegnon	(England) Fulham	End of season	

=== Loans out ===
Date from	Position	Nationality	Name	To	Date until	Ref.
14 September 2021	RB	(England)	Finley Craske	(England) Tiverton Town	16 October 2021	
14 September 2021	DM	(United States)	Ethan Mitchell	(England) Plymouth Parkway	16 October 2021	
29 October 2021	GK	(England)	Luke McCormick	(England) Truro City	29 November 2021	
4 November 2021	CB	(England)	Oliver Tomlinson	(England) Truro City	February 2022	
5 November 2021	RB	(England)	Finley Craske	(England) Plymouth Parkway	December 2021	
19 November 2021	CF	(England)	Rhys Shirley	(England) Plymouth Parkway	17 December 2021	
10 January 2022	DM	(United States)	Ethan Mitchell	(England) Nantwich Town	February 2022	
25 February 2022	DM	(United States)	Ethan Mitchell	(England) Plymouth Parkway	25 March 2022	

=== Transfers out ===
Date	Position	Nationality	Name	To	Fee	Ref.
10 May 2021	CB	(England)	Gary Sawyer	Retired		
30 June 2021	CB	(England)	Will Aimson	(England) Bolton Wanderers	Released	
30 June 2021	RB	(England)	Jarvis Cleal	(United States) NC State Wolfpack	Released	
30 June 2021	CF	(Greece)	Klaidi Lolos	(England) Torquay United	Released	
30 June 2021	CM	(Scotland)	Lewis Macleod	Retired		
30 June 2021	CF	(England)	Byron Moore	(England) Torquay United	Released	
30 June 2021	CF	(England)	Frank Nouble	(England) Colchester United	Released	
30 June 2021	AM	(Northern Ireland)	Ben Reeves	(England) Gillingham	Released	
30 June 2021	GK	(Scotland)	Jack Ruddy	(Northern Ireland) Linfield	Released	
30 June 2021	CF	(England)	Rubin Wilson	(England) Bideford	Released	
30 June 2021	CB	(England)	Scott Wootton	(England) Morecambe	Released	
12 January 2022	CF	(England)	Kieran Agard	(England) Doncaster Rovers	Contract expiry	
