= Callum Burton =

English footballer (born 1996)

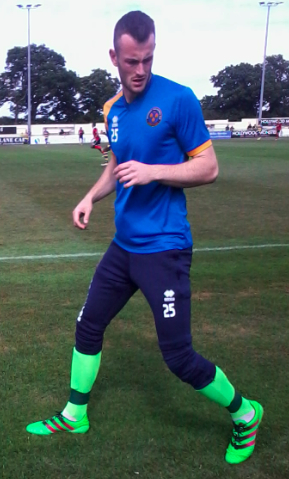
- Burton in 2016

Personal information
- Full name: Callum Alex David Burton
- Date of birth: 15 August 1996 (age 30)
- Place of birth: Newport, England
- Height: 6 ft 2 in (1.88 m)
- Position: Goalkeeper

Team information
- Current team: Wrexham
- Number: 25

Senior career*
Years	Team	Apps	(Gls)
2013–2017	Shrewsbury Town	1	(0)
2013	→ Market Drayton Town (loan)		
2013	→ Workington (loan)	1	(0)
2014–2015	→ Nuneaton Town (loan)	3	(0)
2015	→ Southport (loan)	4	(0)
2016	→ Nuneaton Town (loan)	6	(0)
2017	→ Telford United (loan)	11	(0)
2017–2019	Hull City	0	(0)
2017	→ Salford City (loan)	3	(0)
2018–2019	→ Chesterfield (loan)	19	(0)
2019–2021	Cambridge United	37	(0)
2021–2024	Plymouth Argyle	18	(0)
2024–	Wrexham	4	(0)

International career
2012	England U16	1	(0)
2012	England U17	5	(0)
2013–2014	England U18	3	(0)
- * Club domestic league appearances and goals as of 12:59, 8 December 2024 (UTC)

Callum Alex David Burton (born 15 August 1996) is an English professional footballer who plays as a goalkeeper for EFL Championship club Wrexham. He also represented England up to under-18 level.

== Club career ==
=== Shrewsbury Town ===
Born in Newport, Shropshire, Burton attended Adams' Grammar School. Formed at Shrewsbury Town, on 27 August 2013 he went to nearby Market Drayton Town of the Northern Premier League on a work experience loan. In September, he was loaned to Conference North team Workington, where he made one appearance, a 4–0 loss at Worcester City on 21 September. On 24 February 2014, he signed a two-year professional contract at Shrewsbury.

On 30 August 2014, Burton had his first call-up for Shrewsbury, remaining an unused substitute in their 2–0 home win over Luton Town in League Two. On 23 December, he went on an emergency loan to Conference Premier side Nuneaton Town. He made his debut three days later in a 4–4 home draw with A.F.C. Telford United. His two other appearances for the Warwickshire club were clean sheets: a 1–0 win at Altrincham on 28 December for the team's first away win of the season, and a goalless draw at Telford on 1 January 2015 for which BBC Sport credited him with the result.

On 17 January, Burton went to another team of the same division, Southport, on a month-long loan. He made his debut for the Merseyside club later that day, keeping a clean sheet in a goalless home draw against Chester; his three other games of his loan were all defeats.

Burton made his Shrewsbury Town, and Football League debut, on the final day of the 2015–16 season on 8 May, away at Swindon Town in League One. Shrewsbury lost the game 3–0 at the County Ground, with the first goal from the penalty spot. On 9 June, he extended his contract until 2018.

The following season, with Shrewsbury's two senior goalkeepers Jayson Leutwiler and Mark Halstead competing for a place in the first-team, Burton returned to former loan club Nuneaton Town on a half-season loan deal in August 2016, although this arrangement was ended prematurely on 30 September. He joined National League North side A.F.C. Telford United on an initial one-month loan deal in February 2017, which was later extended until the end of the 2016–17 season.

=== Hull City ===
On 26 July 2017, Burton signed a one-year deal with newly relegated EFL Championship club Hull City for an undisclosed fee. Before making an appearance, he was loaned on 4 November to Salford City in the National League North for one month. He had his first matchday call-up for Hull on 10 March 2018 due to Allan McGregor's injury, and remained an unused substitute in the 4–3 home win over Norwich City. Later that month, he agreed to a new one-year contract.

On 24 August 2018, Burton went on loan to Chesterfield of the National League until 16 January 2019. He made his debut for the Spireites the next day in a 1–0 home loss to Barnet, and was praised by manager Martin Allen after the match. He was sent off on 5 January 2019 against Ebbsfleet United also at the Proact Stadium for giving away a penalty in added time; defender Will Evans saved it to guarantee a 3–3 draw.

He was released by Hull City at the end of the 2018–19 season.

=== Cambridge United ===
On 28 June 2019, Cambridge United announced that Burton had signed a two-year deal with the club. Mainly a backup to Dimitar Mitov, he did not play a league game until 29 December when the Bulgarian was in poor form; his debut was a 1–0 home win against Morecambe.

He came in for an injured Mitov in December 2020 and remained first-choice goalkeeper as Cambridge gained promotion that season.

On 17 May 2021, Cambridge announced they would not be offering Burton a new contract and he was released from his contract

=== Plymouth Argyle ===
On 24 June 2021, Burton signed for EFL League One side Plymouth Argyle. On 22 September 2022 Burton signed a contract extension until the summer of 2024.

On 4 February 2023, Burton made his League One debut for Argyle as a substitute for injured Michael Cooper in a 1–0 loss away against Sheffield Wednesday. Despite Argyle conceding a goal before he came on, Burton maintained a clean sheet during his appearance.

On 21 February 2023 Burton saved three successive penalties in a penalty shoot-out in the EFL Trophy semi-final against Cheltenham Town after the game ended 1-1. The result sent Argyle through to their first appearance in the EFL Trophy final and their third appearance at Wembley Stadium.

On 10 May 2024, the club announced he would be released in the summer once his contract expired.

=== Wrexham ===
On 15 July 2024, Burton joined newly promoted League One side Wrexham on a two-year contract. Having been limited to appearances in cup competitions, a wrist injury to first-choice goalkeeper Arthur Okonkwo allowed Burton to make his league debut for the club on 16 November 2024 in a 1–0 defeat to Stockport County. On 3 December 2024 however, Burton suffered a torn thigh injury in the first-half of a victory over Barnsley, expected to rule him out for the remainder of the season.

== International career ==
Burton made his international debut for England under-16 in a win over Spain on 16 February 2012, keeping a clean sheet in Madrid. On 7 August that year, at the Nordic Tournament in Tórshavn in the Faroe Islands, he made his under-17 debut in a 4–2 win over Finland. His under-18 debut came on 14 October 2013 in a 4–0 win over Hungary at St George's Park, replacing Ted Smith for the final two minutes.

== Style of play ==
Burton is a fan of German football, and as a child idolised Oliver Kahn and more recently Manuel Neuer and Marc-André ter Stegen, while also looking up to England goalkeeper Joe Hart, who also played for Shrewsbury Town.

Following the 2022-23 EFL Trophy semi final where he saved three successive penalties, Burton reflected on the life of a goalkeeper who primarily played as an unused substitute explaining: "If you're a goalkeeper that plays more games than you're on the bench for in your career, you've had a pretty top-drawer career - it's something that you've got to get your head around from early on. There's lots of things that have happened in my career that have made me mentally change my approach, and I think here it's a lot easier when the person ahead of you is doing so well because they just find their place in the team and Coops (Michael Cooper) has been amazing since I've joined".

== Personal life ==
Burton and his wife Day were by 2026 living in Baschurch, Shropshire, where they opened and run as business a coffee shop called "Beans of Baschurch". The couple have two sons.

== Career statistics ==
As of match played 3 December 2024

Appearances and goals by club, season and competition
Club	Season	League			FA Cup		League Cup		Other		Total	
Club	Season	Division	Apps	Goals	Apps	Goals	Apps	Goals	Apps	Goals	Apps	Goals
Shrewsbury Town	2013–14	League One	0	0	0	0	0	0	0	0	0	0
Shrewsbury Town	2014–15	League Two	0	0	0	0	0	0	0	0	0	0
Shrewsbury Town	2015–16	League One	1	0	0	0	0	0	0	0	1	0
Shrewsbury Town	2016–17	League One	0	0	0	0	0	0	0	0	0	0
Shrewsbury Town	Total		1	0	0	0	0	0	0	0	1	0
Workington (loan)	2013–14	Conference North	1	0	0	0	0	0	0	0	1	0
Nuneaton Town (loan)	2014–15	Conference Premier	3	0	0	0	0	0	0	0	3	0
Southport (loan)	2014–15	Conference Premier	4	0	0	0	0	0	0	0	4	0
Nuneaton Town (loan)	2016–17	National League North	6	0	0	0	0	0	0	0	6	0
A.F.C. Telford United (loan)	2016–17	National League North	11	0	0	0	0	0	0	0	11	0
Hull City	2017–18	Championship	0	0	0	0	0	0	0	0	0	0
Salford City (loan)	2017–18	National League North	3	0	0	0	0	0	0	0	3	0
Chesterfield (loan)	2018–19	National League	19	0	3	0	0	0	1	0	23	0
Cambridge United	2019–20	League Two	10	0	2	0	2	0	3	0	17	0
Cambridge United	2020–21	League Two	27	0	0	0	1	0	5	0	33	0
Cambridge United	Total		37	0	2	0	3	0	8	0	50	0
Plymouth Argyle	2021–22	League One	0	0	0	0	1	0	3	0	4	0
Plymouth Argyle	2022–23	League One	18	0	0	0	0	0	8	0	26	0
Plymouth Argyle	2023–24	Championship	0	0	0	0	2	0	0	0	2	0
Plymouth Argyle	Total		18	0	0	0	3	0	11	0	32	0
Wrexham	2024–25	League One	4	0	0	0	1	0	3	0	8	0
Career total			107	0	5	0	7	0	23	0	142	0

== Honours ==
Cambridge United

- EFL League Two second-place promotion: 2020–21

Plymouth Argyle

- EFL League One: 2022–23
- EFL Trophy runner-up: 2022–23

Wrexham

- EFL League One second-place promotion: 2024–25
