= Steven Sessegnon =

English footballer (born 2000)

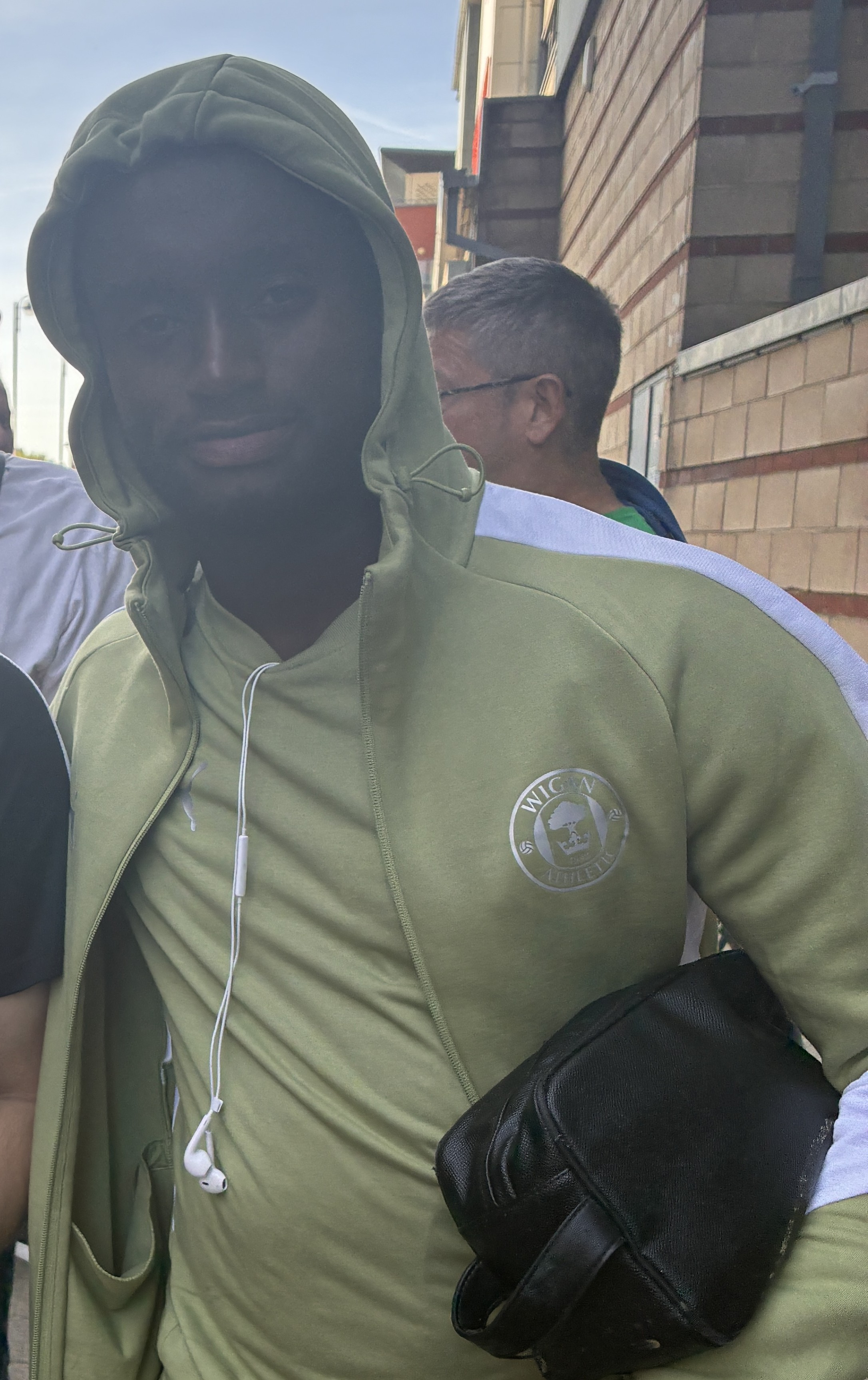
- Sessegnon with Wigan Athletic in 2025.

Personal information
- Full name: Zeze Steven Sessegnon
- Date of birth: 18 May 2000 (age 26)
- Place of birth: Roehampton, England
- Height: 5 ft 9 in (1.75 m)
- Positions: Left-back; right-back

Team information
- Current team: AFC Wimbledon
- Number: 2

Youth career
- 2008–2017: Fulham

Senior career*
Years	Team	Apps	(Gls)
2017–2023	Fulham	14	(0)
2020–2021	→ Bristol City (loan)	16	(0)
2022	→ Plymouth Argyle (loan)	10	(0)
2022–2023	→ Charlton Athletic (loan)	33	(1)
2023–2026	Wigan Athletic	50	(0)
2026–	AFC Wimbledon	11	(0)

International career^{‡}
2015	England U16	1	(0)
2017	England U17	10	(0)
2018	England U18	2	(0)
2018–2019	England U19	9	(2)
2019	England U20	2	(0)
2021–2022	England U21	5	(0)
2026–	Turks and Caicos Islands	2	(0)
Medal record
Men's football
Representing England
FIFA U-17 World Cup
Winner	2017 India
- * Club domestic league appearances and goals as of 1 November 2026 (UTC) ‡ National team caps and goals as of 14:25, 29 September 2026 (UTC)

Zeze Steven Sessegnon (born 18 May 2000) is a professional footballer who plays as a defender or midfielder for EFL League One club AFC Wimbledon. Born in England, he represents the Turks and Caicos Islands at international level.

== Club career ==
=== Fulham ===
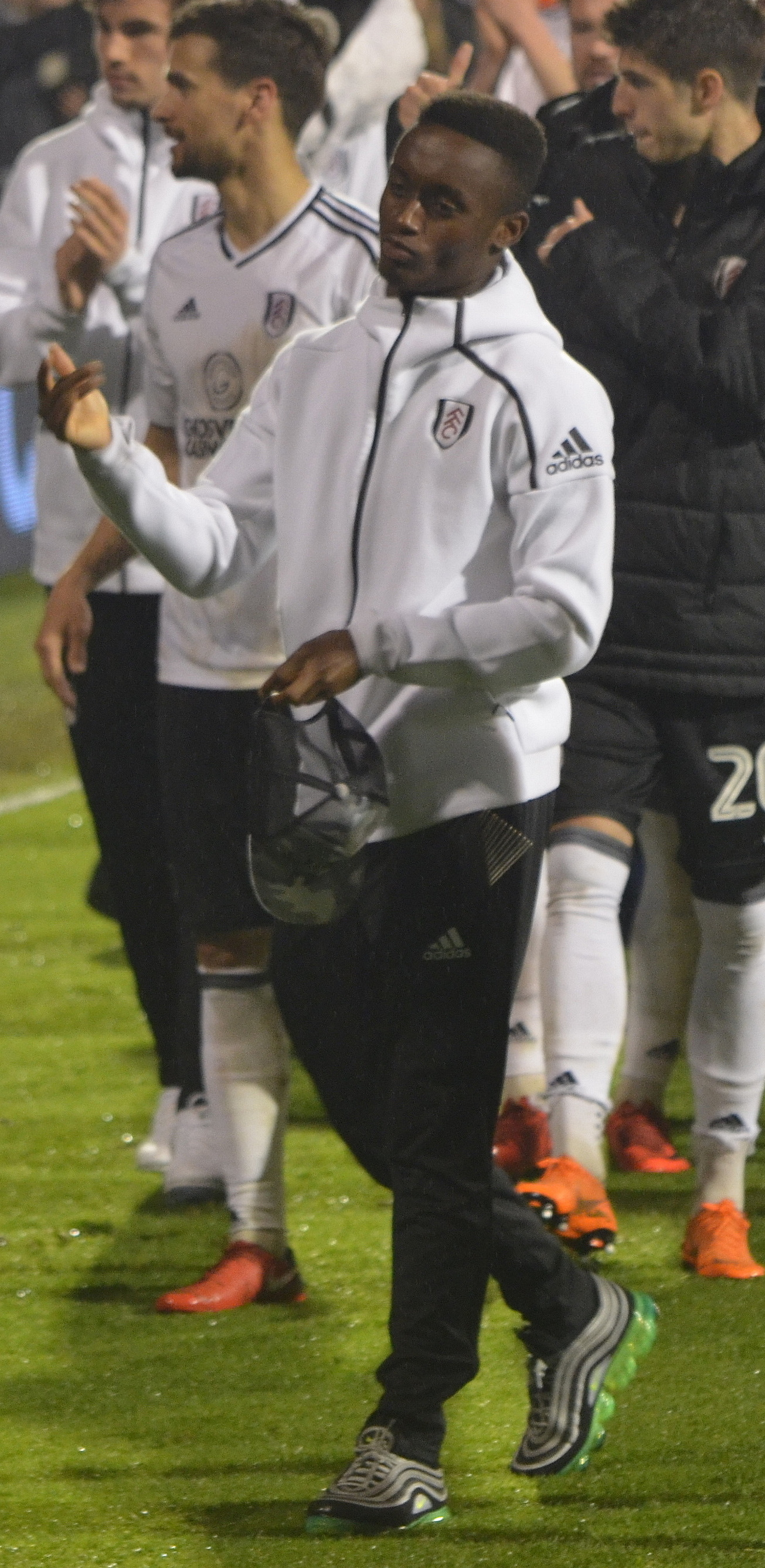
Sessegnon with Fulham in 2018.

On 28 June 2017, Sessegnon signed his first professional contract with Fulham, pledging his future to the West London club until 2020. He made his debut on 8 August 2017 in an EFL Cup first round tie against Wycombe Wanderers. He played the full ninety minutes in a Fulham win, playing the last nine minutes on the pitch with brother Ryan. He also featured in the following round two weeks later, a 1–0 home defeat to League One side Bristol Rovers. His first appearance in league football arrived on 16 August 2019 in the Championship versus Huddersfield Town.

==== Loans ====
Sessegnon signed a season-long loan deal with Championship club Bristol City on 7 September 2020.

On 31 January 2022, Sessegnon joined EFL League One side Plymouth Argyle on loan for the remainder of the 2021–22 season.

On 5 July 2022, Sessegnon joined League One side Charlton Athletic on loan for the 2022–23 season. On 11 March 2023, Sessegnon scored his first professional goal, scoring the equalising goal in a 1–1 draw between Charlton Athletic and Accrington Stanley.

=== Wigan Athletic ===
On 26 August 2023, Sessegnon signed for League One club Wigan Athletic on a two-year deal.

On 9 May 2025, Wigan said the player had been transfer listed.

=== AFC Wimbledon ===
On 25 June 2026, Sessegnon joined AFC Wimbledon on a two-year deal, with the option of a further year.

== International career ==
Sessegnon has represented England at under-16 up to under-20 level. His one appearance for the U16s came on 4 December 2015 versus Brazil.

Sessegnon was called up to the England squad for the 2017 FIFA U-17 World Cup in India. He featured five times, including a start in the final, as England won the trophy.

March 2018 saw Sessegnon win his first U18 caps, versus Qatar and Argentina respectively. In May 2018, Sessegnon was selected for the U18s squad for the 2018 Panda Cup.

His opening under-19s call-up came in the following August for friendlies with the Netherlands and Belgium. He scored for the U19s on 14 November versus Moldova.

Sessegnon made his England U20 debut during the opening 2019 Toulon Tournament defeat to Japan on 1 June 2019.

On 30 August 2019, Sessegnon was included in the England U21 squad for the first time and made his debut during the 3–2 2021 U21 Euro qualifying win against Turkey on 6 September 2019.

In September 2026, Sessegnon was called up to the Turks and Caicos Islands national team for the first time. Sessegnon made his debut for the Turks and Caicos on 23 September 2026, starting in a CONCACAF Nations League game against Montserrat.

== Personal life ==
He is the twin brother of fellow professional footballer, and former Fulham teammate, Ryan. Their older brother Chris plays football at semi-professional level, and they are cousins of Beninese international footballer Stéphane Sessègnon.

== Career statistics ==
As of 21 February 2026

Appearances and goals by club, season and competition
Club	Season	League			FA Cup		EFL Cup		Other		Total	
Club	Season	Division	Apps	Goals	Apps	Goals	Apps	Goals	Apps	Goals	Apps	Goals
Fulham U21	2017–18	—			—		—		1 (Note: Appearances in EFL Trophy)	0	1	0
Fulham U21	2018–19	—			—		—		1	0	1	0
Fulham U21	Total		—		—		—		2	0	2	0
Fulham	2017–18	Championship	0	0	0	0	2	0	0	0	2	0
Fulham	2018–19	Premier League	0	0	0	0	2	0	—		2	0
Fulham	2019–20	Championship	14	0	1	0	0	0	0	0	15	0
Fulham	2020–21	Premier League	0	0	0	0	0	0	—		0	0
Fulham	2021–22	Championship	0	0	0	0	0	0	—		0	0
Fulham	2022–23	Premier League	0	0	0	0	0	0	—		0	0
Fulham	Total		14	0	1	0	4	0	0	0	19	0
Bristol City (loan)	2020–21	Championship	16	0	0	0	2	0	—		18	0
Plymouth Argyle (loan)	2021–22	League One	10	0	—		—		—		10	0
Charlton Athletic (loan)	2022–23	League One	33	1	2	0	3	0	0	0	38	1
Wigan Athletic	2023–24	League One	26	0	2	1	0	0	1	0	29	1
Wigan Athletic	2024–25	League One	13	0	2	0	0	0	0	0	15	0
Wigan Athletic	2025–26	League One	11	0	1	0	1	0	2	0	15	0
Wigan Athletic	Total		50	0	5	1	1	0	3	0	59	1
AFC Wimbledon	2026–27	League One	0	0	0	0	0	0	0	0	0	0
Career total			123	1	8	1	10	0	5	0	146	2

== Honours ==
Fulham

- EFL Championship play-offs: 2020

England U17

- FIFA U-17 World Cup: 2017
