= Jordan Houghton =

English footballer (born 1995)

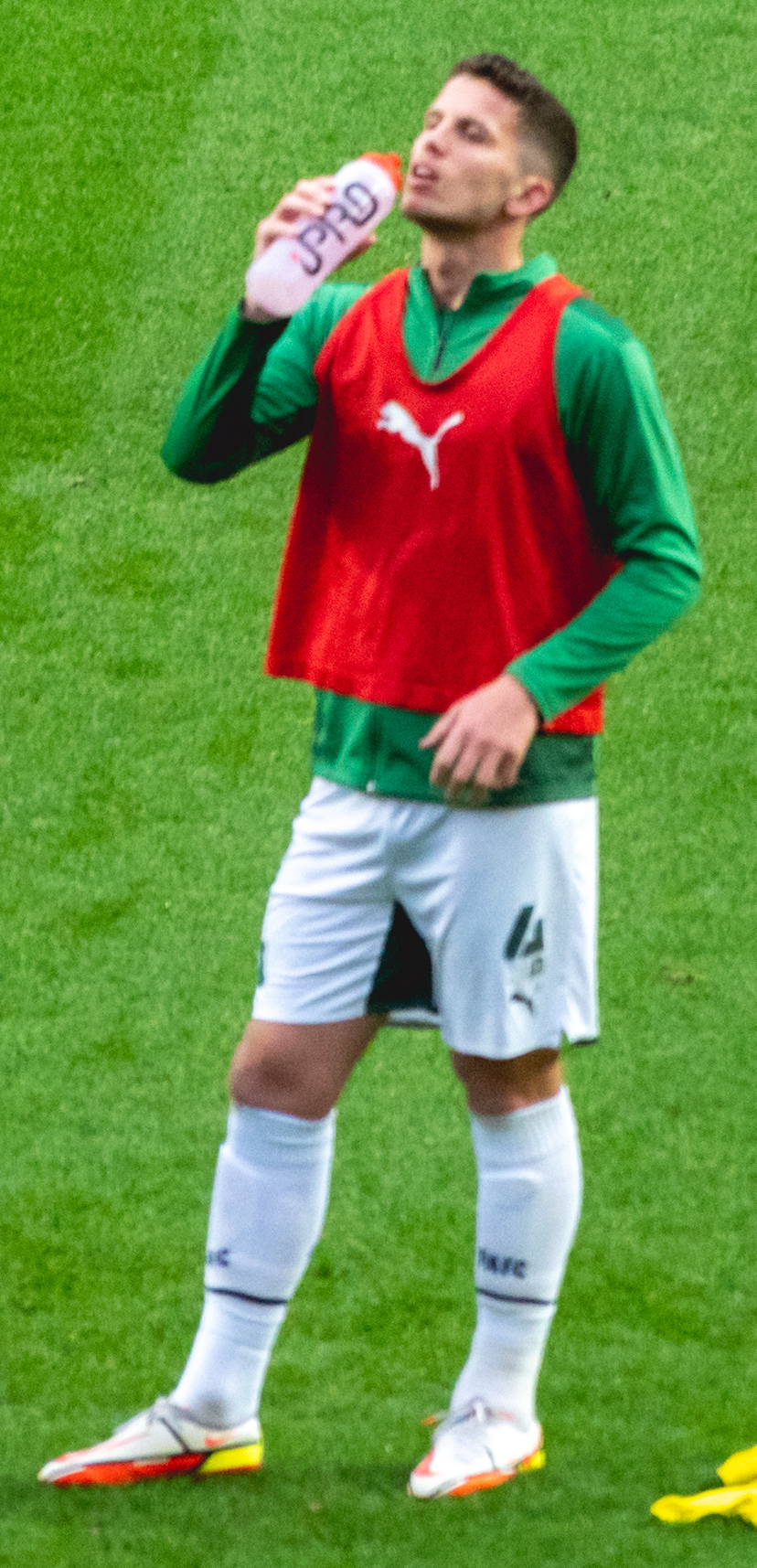
- Houghton with Plymouth Argyle

Personal information
- Full name: Jordan Alexander Houghton
- Date of birth: 5 November 1995 (age 30)
- Place of birth: Chertsey, England
- Height: 6 ft 0 in (1.82 m)
- Position: Defensive midfielder

Team information
- Current team: Stevenage
- Number: 4

Youth career
- 2003–2014: Chelsea

Senior career*
Years	Team	Apps	(Gls)
2014–2018	Chelsea	0	(0)
2015–2016	→ Gillingham (loan)	11	(1)
2016	→ Plymouth Argyle (loan)	10	(1)
2016–2017	→ Doncaster Rovers (loan)	32	(1)
2017–2018	→ Doncaster Rovers (loan)	37	(0)
2018–2021	Milton Keynes Dons	93	(4)
2021–2025	Plymouth Argyle	142	(1)
2025–	Stevenage	38	(0)

International career^{‡}
2010–2011	England U16	7	(3)
2011–2012	England U17	8	(0)
2014	England U20	2	(0)
- * Club domestic league appearances and goals as of 23:34, 14 July 2026 (UTC) ‡ National team caps and goals as of 12:39, 9 August 2015 (UTC)

Jordan Alexander Houghton (born 5 November 1995) is an English professional footballer who plays as a defensive midfielder for EFL League One club Stevenage.

== Club career ==
=== Chelsea ===
Houghton joined Chelsea's academy at Under-8. In November 2014, he signed his first professional contract which would keep him at the club until the end of the 2016–17 season.

==== Loan to Gillingham ====
On 20 July 2015, Houghton signed for League One side Gillingham on loan until 3 January 2016. On 8 August 2015, he made his professional debut in a 4–0 home victory against Sheffield United, playing the full 90 minutes. After establishing himself in the starting 11, Houghton scored his first professional goal in a 5–1 victory over Fleetwood Town on 29 September, also at Priestfield Stadium.

On 2 January 2016, Houghton announced via his social media accounts that Gillingham had decided against extending his loan and that he would return to Chelsea after failing to impress under manager Justin Edinburgh.

==== Loan to Plymouth Argyle ====
On 10 March 2016, Houghton signed for League Two side Plymouth Argyle on loan. Two days later, he made his "Pilgrims" debut in a 2–1 away defeat to Accrington Stanley, playing the full 90 minutes. On 25 March, he scored his first Plymouth goal in the 14th minute of a 2–0 away victory against Morecambe.

==== Loan to Doncaster Rovers ====
On 6 August 2016, it was announced that Houghton will join Doncaster Rovers on loan until 3 January 2017. After the loan move was completed, Houghton made his debut as he started against Accrington Stanley in a 3–2 loss. His loan deal was extended till the end of the season on 1 January 2017. On 1 January 2017, the loan deal got extended once more, this time until 31 May 2017. On 21 February 2017, Houghton's loan spell was terminated after the midfielder suffered a knee injury during Doncaster's 1–1 draw with Luton Town on 18 February.

On 31 August 2017, Houghton returned to Doncaster on loan until 3 January 2018. Two days later, he made his Doncaster return during their 0–0 draw with Peterborough United, replacing Niall Mason in the 59th minute. On 5 January 2018, Houghton's loan spell at Doncaster was extended until the end of the campaign.

=== Milton Keynes Dons ===
On 6 July 2018, following his release from Chelsea, Houghton signed for League Two club Milton Keynes Dons on a two-year deal. He scored his first goal for the club on 27 October 2018, a long range strike in a 1–1 draw away to Mansfield Town. Following three seasons, a promotion and 107 appearances for the club, on 6 May 2021, MK Dons announced Houghton was one of four players to be released at the end of the 2020–21 season.

=== Plymouth Argyle ===
On 25 June 2021, Houghton signed for League One side Plymouth Argyle on a permanent basis after his last spell at the club five years ago. Following the 2021–22 season, the club opted to have the extension option on his contract extended.

On 2 June 2023, Houghton signed a new two-year contract following Plymouth Argyle's promotion to the Championship.

In June 2025, Houghton turned down the offer of a new deal at Plymouth in order to sign for Stevenage.

== Career statistics ==
As of end of 2025–26 season

Appearances and goals by club, season and competition
Club	Season	League			FA Cup		League Cup		Other		Total	
Club	Season	Division	Apps	Goals	Apps	Goals	Apps	Goals	Apps	Goals	Apps	Goals
Chelsea	2015–16	Premier League	0	0	0	0	0	0	0	0	0	0
Chelsea	2016–17	Premier League	0	0	0	0	0	0	—		0	0
Chelsea	2017–18	Premier League	0	0	0	0	0	0	0	0	0	0
Chelsea	Total		0	0	0	0	0	0	0	0	0	0
Gillingham (loan)	2015–16	League One	11	1	1	0	2	0	1 (Note: Appearance(s) in EFL Trophy)	0	15	1
Plymouth Argyle (loan)	2015–16	League Two	10	1	0	0	0	0	0	0	10	1
Doncaster Rovers (loan)	2016–17	League Two	32	1	0	0	1	0	3	0	36	1
Doncaster Rovers (loan)	2017–18	League One	37	0	2	1	1	0	0	0	40	1
Milton Keynes Dons	2018–19	League Two	44	2	1	0	2	0	1	0	48	2
Milton Keynes Dons	2019–20	League One	30	2	1	0	1	0	4	0	36	2
Milton Keynes Dons	2020–21	League One	19	0	1	0	1	0	2	0	23	0
Milton Keynes Dons	Total		93	4	3	0	4	0	7	0	107	4
Plymouth Argyle	2021–22	League One	42	1	5	0	2	0	1	0	50	1
Plymouth Argyle	2022–23	League One	44	0	0	0	1	0	5	0	50	0
Plymouth Argyle	2023–24	Championship	40	0	1	0	1	0	—		42	0
Plymouth Argyle	2024–25	Championship	30	0	1	0	1	0	—		32	0
Plymouth Argyle	Total		142	1	7	0	5	0	6	0	160	1
Stevenage	2025–26	League One	38	0	1	0	1	0	2 (Note: Appearances in League One play-offs)	0	42	0
Stevenage	2026–27	League One	0	0	0	0	0	0	0	0	0	0
Stevenage	Total		38	0	1	0	1	0	2	0	42	0
Career total			359	8	14	1	14	0	19	0	406	9

== Honours ==
Chelsea

- FA Youth Cup: 2013–14

Doncaster Rovers

- EFL League Two third-place promotion: 2016–17

Milton Keynes Dons

- EFL League Two third-place promotion: 2018–19

Plymouth Argyle

- EFL League One: 2022–23
- EFL Trophy runner-up: 2022–23

England U16

- Victory Shield: 2010
