= Oliver Tomlinson =

English association football player (born 2002)

Personal information
- Full name: Oliver Joseph Tomlinson
- Date of birth: 19 May 2002 (age 24)
- Place of birth: Ivybridge, England
- Height: 1.85 m (6 ft 1 in)
- Position: Defender

Team information
- Current team: Bath City
- Number: 4

Youth career
- Marine Academy Plymouth
- Ivybridge Town
- –2020: Plymouth Argyle

Senior career*
Years	Team	Apps	(Gls)
2020–2022	Plymouth Argyle	2	(0)
2020	→ Barnstaple Town (loan)	6	(0)
2021–2022	→ Truro City (loan)	20	(2)
2022–	Torquay United	48	(1)
2023	→ Taunton Town (loan)	3	(0)
2023	→ Chippenham Town (loan)	12	(1)
2024–2025	→ Bath City (loan)	8	(0)
2025–	Bath City	56	(1)
- * Club domestic league appearances and goals as of 13:20, 6 September 2026 (UTC)

Oliver Tomlinson (born 19 May 2002) is an English professional footballer who plays as a defender for Southern League Premier Division South club Bath City.

== Career ==
Born in Ivybridge, Tomlinson joined Plymouth Argyle's academy as an under-13, and signed his first professional contract in 2020.

He made his professional debut on 8 September 2020, when he started in Argyle's 3–2 defeat to Norwich City U21s in the EFL Trophy. Just a few days after making his debut, Tomlinson signed on loan for Southern League Div1 South side Barnstaple Town. He made his league debut for Plymouth on 1 May 2021 as a 68th-minute substitute in a 3–1 defeat to Sunderland.

On 4 November 2021, Tomlinson joined Southern League Premier Division South side Truro City on a three-month loan deal.

Tomlinson was released by Plymouth at the end of the 2021–22 season before signing for National League club Torquay United in July 2022. In January 2023, he joined National League South side Taunton Town on loan. In March 2023, he joined Chippenham Town on a loan deal until the end of the season. In November 2024, he joined Bath City on a one-month loan deal. On 24 December 2024, he extended his loan until the end of the season. On 21 January 2025, this loan became a permanent transfer when it was announced that Tomlinson had signed a contract until the end of the 2025–26 season.

== Career statistics ==
As of match played 5 September 2026

Appearances and goals by club, season and competition
Club	Season	League			FA Cup		EFL Cup		Other		Total	
Club	Season	Division	Apps	Goals	Apps	Goals	Apps	Goals	Apps	Goals	Apps	Goals
Plymouth Argyle	2020–21	League One	2	0	0	0	0	0	1 (Note: Appearance(s) in the Football League Trophy)	0	3	0
Plymouth Argyle	2021–22	League One	0	0	0	0	1	0	3	0	4	0
Plymouth Argyle	Total		2	0	0	0	1	0	4	0	7	0
Barnstaple Town (loan)	2020–21	SFL – Division One South	6	0	2	0	—		1 (Note: Appearance(s) in the FA Trophy)	0	9	0
Truro City (loan)	2021–22	SFL – Premier Division South	20	2	0	0	—		4 (Note: One appearance in FA Trophy, three appearances in Southern League Cup)	0	24	2
Torquay United	2022–23	National League	6	0	2	0	—		1	0	9	0
Torquay United	2023–24	National League South	41	1	3	0	—		3	1	47	2
Torquay United	2024–25	National League South	1	0	1	0	—		1 (Note: Appearance in Devon St Lukes Challenge Cup)	0	3	0
Torquay United	Total		48	1	6	0	—		5	1	59	2
Taunton Town (loan)	2022–23	National League South	3	0	—		—		—		3	0
Chippenham Town (loan)	2022–23	National League South	12	1	—		—		—		12	1
Bath City (loan)	2024–25	National League South	8	0	—		—		—		8	0
Bath City	2024–25	National League South	20	1	—		—		—		20	1
Bath City	2025–26	National League South	30	0	1	0	—		3 (Note: One appearance in FA Trophy, two appearances in Somerset Premier Cup)	0	34	0
Bath City	2026–27	SFL – Premier Division South	6	0	1	0	—		0	0	7	0
Bath City	Total		56	1	2	0	—		3	0	61	1
Career total			155	5	10	0	1	0	17	1	183	6
