= Michael Cooper (footballer) =

English footballer

Personal information
- Full name: Michael John Cooper
- Date of birth: 8 October 1999 (age 27)
- Place of birth: Exeter, England
- Height: 6 ft 1 in (1.85 m)
- Position: Goalkeeper

Team information
- Current team: Sheffield United
- Number: 1

Youth career
- 2009–2017: Plymouth Argyle

Senior career*
Years	Team	Apps	(Gls)
2017–2024	Plymouth Argyle	151	(0)
2024–	Sheffield United	93	(0)
- * Club domestic league appearances and goals as of 22:25 21 November 2026 (UTC)

Michael John Cooper (born 8 October 1999) is an English professional footballer who plays as a goalkeeper for EFL Championship club Sheffield United.

== Career ==
=== Plymouth Argyle ===
Michael Cooper made his professional debut for Plymouth Argyle in a League One game away to Blackburn Rovers aged 18 years and 6 days old. With starting goalkeeper Kyle Letheren going off injured, Cooper came on for the second half, as the game finished 1–1. He was also a key member of the Plymouth Argyle Youth Team who reached the last 16 of the FA Youth Cup, making crucial saves in victories over Manchester City and Burnley in 3rd and 4th rounds of the competition.

On 17 December 2019, Cooper signed a new long-term deal at Plymouth Argyle, until the end of the 2021–22 season.

On 5 September 2020, Cooper started in the first match of the Argyle season, playing Queens Park Rangers in the first round of the EFL Cup. Argyle won 3–2 after a spectacular performance from Cooper. Cooper held onto the starting position for the 2020–21 season.

In April 2021, Cooper signed a new long-term deal with Argyle, signing on until 2024. He was also voted Young Player of the Season 2020–21 by Plymouth Argyle supporters, coming second in the senior vote to squad Vice-Captain, Joe Edwards.

The following season he received the EFL League One Golden Glove (jointly with Wycombe's David Stockdale) for keeping the most clean sheets, having kept 18 clean sheets across 46 league games. He was also named as Plymouth's Player of the Season and in the EFL League One Team of the Year.

=== Sheffield United ===
On 15 August 2024, Cooper joined Sheffield United for an undisclosed fee. Upon arrival, he became their first-choice goalkeeper following the departure of Wes Foderingham on 30 June. On 24 August, Cooper made his debut in a 1–1 draw away at Norwich City.

== Career statistics ==
As of match played 26 October 2026

Appearances and goals by club, season and competition
Club	Season	League			FA Cup		League Cup		Other		Total	
Club	Season	Division	Apps	Goals	Apps	Goals	Apps	Goals	Apps	Goals	Apps	Goals
Plymouth Argyle	2017–18	League One	1	0	0	0	0	0	0	0	1	0
Plymouth Argyle	2018–19	League One	1	0	0	0	0	0	1 (Note: Appearance(s) in EFL Trophy)	0	2	0
Plymouth Argyle	2019–20	League Two	0	0	0	0	2	0	2	0	4	0
Plymouth Argyle	2020–21	League One	46	0	4	0	2	0	0	0	52	0
Plymouth Argyle	2021–22	League One	46	0	5	0	1	0	0	0	52	0
Plymouth Argyle	2022–23	League One	29	0	1	0	1	0	0	0	31	0
Plymouth Argyle	2023–24	Championship	19	0	0	0	0	0	0	0	19	0
Plymouth Argyle	Total		151	0	10	0	6	0	3	0	170	0
Sheffield United	2024–25	Championship	43	0	0	0	0	0	3 (Note: Appearances in EFL Championship play-offs)	0	46	0
Sheffield United	2025–26	Championship	34	0	0	0	0	0	0	0	34	0
Sheffield United	2026–27	Championship	12	0	0	0	2	0	0	0	14	0
Sheffield United	Total		89	0	0	0	2	0	3	0	94	0
Career total			240	0	10	0	8	0	6	0	264	0

== Honours ==
Plymouth Argyle

- EFL League One: 2022–23
- EFL Trophy runner-up: 2022–23

Individual

- Plymouth Argyle Young Player of the Season: 2020–21
- Plymouth Argyle Player of the Season: 2021–22, 2022–23
- EFL Golden Glove: League One 2021–22
- EFL League One Team of the Season: 2021–22, 2022–23
- Sheffield United Player of the Year: 2024–25
