= Brandon Pursall =

English footballer (born 2004)

Personal information
- Full name: Brandon Edward Pursall
- Date of birth: 16 March 2004 (age 22)
- Place of birth: St Stephen-in-Brannel, England
- Height: 1.88 m (6 ft 2 in)
- Position: Defender

Team information
- Current team: SKU Amstetten
- Number: 19

Youth career
- Plymouth Argyle

Senior career*
Years	Team	Apps	(Gls)
2020–2023	Plymouth Argyle	0	(0)
2022	→ Plymouth Parkway (loan)	4	(0)
2022–2023	→ Tavistock (loan)	21	(0)
2023–2024	Mousehole	19	(1)
2024–2026	Lask Amateure OÖ	18	(0)
2026	→ SW Bregenz (loan)	7	(0)
2026–	SKU Amstetten	2	(0)
- * Club domestic league appearances and goals as of 12:44, 14 August 2026 (UTC)

Brandon Edward Pursall (born 16 March 2004) is an English footballer who plays as a defender for SKU Amstetten.

== Career ==
Pursall joined Argyle's academy set-up as an under-9. He represented the East Cornwall Schoolboys side in the under-14 and under-15 categories. He signed a two-year scholarship deal with Argyle in the summer of 2020.

Pursall made his professional debut on 8 September 2020, as a 76th minute substitute for club captain Gary Sawyer, in a 3–2 defeat to Norwich City U21s in the EFL Trophy. He made his full debut in Argyle's next game in the competition, playing 90 minutes at left-centre-half, in Argyle's 2–0 EFL Trophy defeat to Cheltenham Town on 6 October 2020.

On 25 July 2022, Pursall signed for Southern Football League Premier Division South club Plymouth Parkway on a short-term loan deal.

He was released by Plymouth at the end of the 2022–23 season.

In June 2024, Pursall was announced to have joined LASK reserves side, LASK Amateure OÖ, playing in the Austrian Regionalliga. On 17 February 2026, it was confirmed that Pursall had joined 2. Liga side SW Bregenz on loan.

In July 2026, Pursall joined 2. Liga side SKU Amstetten on a permanent deal.

== Career statistics ==
As of end of 2023–24 season

Appearances and goals by club, season and competition
Club	Season	League			FA Cup		League Cup		Other		Total	
Club	Season	Division	Apps	Goals	Apps	Goals	Apps	Goals	Apps	Goals	Apps	Goals
Plymouth Argyle	2020–21	League Two	0	0	0	0	0	0	3 (Note: Appearance(s) in EFL Trophy)	0	3	0
Plymouth Argyle	2021–22	League One	0	0	0	0	0	0	2	0	2	0
Plymouth Argyle	2022–23	League One	0	0	0	0	0	0	3	0	3	0
Plymouth Argyle	Total		0	0	0	0	0	0	8	0	8	0
Plymouth Parkway (loan)	2022–23	Southern League Premier Division South	4	0	0	0	—		0	0	4	0
Tavistock (loan)	2022–23	Southern League Division One South	21	0	0	0	—		0	0	21	0
Mousehole	2023–24	Southern League Division One South	19	1	2	0	—		3 (Note: Appearance(s) in FA Trophy)	0	24	1
Career total			44	1	2	0	0	0	11	0	57	1
