= Kam Kandola =

English footballer (born 2004)

Personal information
- Full name: Kamran Kandola
- Date of birth: 3 January 2004 (age 22)
- Place of birth: Wolverhampton, England
- Position: Defender

Team information
- Current team: Hereford
- Number: 4

Youth career
- 2011–2024: Wolverhampton Wanderers

Senior career*
Years	Team	Apps	(Gls)
2024–2026	Kidderminster Harriers	65	(2)
2026–	Hereford	14	(0)
- * Club domestic league appearances and goals as of 20:16, 21 November 2026 (UTC)

Kamran Kandola (born 3 January 2004) is an English footballer who plays as a defender for National League North club Hereford.

== Career ==
=== Early career ===
Kandola began his career at Wolverhampton Wanderers. He signed his first professional contract in November 2021. Naturally a defender, whilst playing for Wolves U21 in March 2023, he played 70 minutes as a makeshift goalkeeper, saving a penalty immediately after coming off the bench. He spent 13 years in total with the youth academy before being released in September 2024. Before departing Wolves, he had an unsuccessful trial with League Two club Cheltenham Town.

=== Non-League career ===
In September 2024, Kandola signed for National League North club Kidderminster Harriers. In June 2025, he extended his contract for a further year after winning the club's young player of the year award. Despite earning promotion to the National League via the play-offs, he was released by the club at the end of the 2025–26 season.

On 17 June 2026, Kandola joined National League North club Hereford, signing a two-year contract. On the eve of their first game of the season, he was named vice-captain. He made his debut on the opening day of the season on 8 August 2026 in a 2–1 league defeat away against Buxton. Captaining the side in the absence of Lewis Hudson, he received a straight red card in the 73rd minute in his second home game for the club.

== Personal life ==
Kandola was born and raised in Wolverhampton and is of Sikh-Punjabi heritage. He attended Thomas Telford School, the same school as former Aston Villa FA Youth Cup winner and fellow Sikh-Punjabi Arjan Raikhy.

In July 2023, Kandola's story was profiled in All Stars, a children's football activity book commissioned by the Premier League and produced as part of its South Asian Action Plan. The book was published during South Asian Heritage Month and he was featured alongside other people of South Asian heritage working in football.

In May 2025, Kandola was named in Sky Sports' annual South Asians in Football Team of the Season, an XI selected by journalists to recognise the contribution of British South Asian players. He was named in the squad once again at the following year's awards.

== Career statistics ==
As of match played 21 November 2026

Appearances and goals by club, season and competition
Club	Season	League			FA Cup		EFL Cup		Other		Total	
Club	Season	Division	Apps	Goals	Apps	Goals	Apps	Goals	Apps	Goals	Apps	Goals
Wolverhampton; Wanderers U21	2021–22	—			—		—		1 (Note: Appearance(s) in EFL Trophy)	0	1	0
Wolverhampton; Wanderers U21	2022–23	—			—		—		2	0	2	0
Wolverhampton; Wanderers U21	2023–24	—			—		—		3	0	3	0
Wolverhampton; Wanderers U21	Total		—		—		—		6	0	6	0
Kidderminster Harriers	2024–25	National League North	29	1	2	1	—		4 (Note: Three appearances in FA Trophy; one appearance in National League North play-offs)	0	35	2
Kidderminster Harriers	2025–26	National League North	36	1	1	0	—		7 (Note: Five appearances in FA Trophy; two appearances in National League North play-offs)	0	44	1
Kidderminster Harriers	Total		65	2	3	1	—		11	0	79	3
Hereford	2026–27	National League North	14	0	1	0	—		1 (Note: Appearance in FA Trophy)	0	16	0
Career total			79	2	4	1	0	0	18	0	101	3
