= Finley Craske =

English footballer (born 2003)

Personal information
- Full name: Finley Thomas Craske
- Date of birth: 27 January 2003 (age 23)
- Place of birth: Wadebridge, England
- Position: Defender

Youth career
- –2020: Plymouth Argyle

Senior career*
Years	Team	Apps	(Gls)
2020–2023	Plymouth Argyle	3	(0)
2021	→ Tiverton Town (loan)	1	(0)
2021–2022	→ Plymouth Parkway (loan)	23	(1)
2022	→ Yeovil Town (loan)	2	(0)
2023	→ Truro City (loan)	19	(0)
2023–2025	Torquay United	39	(2)
- * Club domestic league appearances and goals as of 22:04, 3 May 2025 (UTC)

Finley Thomas Craske (born 27 January 2003) is an English footballer who plays as a defender most recently for National League South club Torquay United.

== Early life ==
Craske attended Ivybridge Community College in Ivybridge, Devon.

== Career ==
He joined the academy of Plymouth Argyle at under-9 level. He signed a full-time apprenticeship at the club in summer 2019, and made his professional debut on 10 November 2020 as a second-half substitute in a 3–1 EFL Trophy victory over Newport County. He made his league debut for the club on 9 May 2021 as a substitute in a 1–0 defeat away to Gillingham on the final day of the season. Craske signed his first professional contract with the club in June 2022.

In September 2021, Craske joined Southern League Premier Division club Tiverton Town on a one-month loan deal. In November 2021, Craske joined Southern League Division One South club Plymouth Parkway on a one-month work experience loan deal. This move was later extended before Craske was recalled in February 2022.

On 1 August 2022, Craske joined National League club Yeovil Town on a season-long loan deal. In January 2023, Craske joined Truro City on loan until the end of the season.

He was released by Plymouth at the end of the 2022–23 season.

== Career statistics ==
As of end of 2024–25 season

Appearances and goals by club, season and competition
Club	Season	League			FA Cup		EFL Cup		Other		Total	
Club	Season	Division	Apps	Goals	Apps	Goals	Apps	Goals	Apps	Goals	Apps	Goals
Plymouth Argyle	2020–21	League One	1	0	0	0	0	0	1 (Note: Appearance(s) in EFL Trophy)	0	2	0
Plymouth Argyle	2021–22	League One	0	0	0	0	0	0	2	0	2	0
Plymouth Argyle	2022–23	League One	2	0	0	0	0	0	3	0	5	0
Plymouth Argyle	Total		3	0	0	0	0	0	6	0	9	0
Tiverton Town (loan)	2021–22	Southern League; Premier Division South	1	0	0	0	—		0	0	1	0
Plymouth Parkway (loan)	2021–22	Southern League; Division One South	23	1	0	0	—		5 (Note: Four appearances in FA Trophy, one appearance in Devon Senior Cup)	0	28	1
Yeovil Town (loan)	2022–23	National League	2	0	0	0	—		0	0	2	0
Truro City (loan)	2022–23	Southern League; Premier Division South	19	0	—		—		2 (Note: Appearances in Southern League Premier Division South play-offs)	0	21	0
Torquay United	2023–24	National League South	12	0	2	0	—		1 (Note: Appearance in Devon St Lukes Challenge Cup)	0	15	0
Torquay United	2024–25	National League South	27	2	1	0	—		2 (Note: One appearance in FA Trophy, one appearance in National League South play-offs)	0	30	2
Torquay United	Total		39	2	3	0	—		3	0	45	2
Career total			87	3	3	0	0	0	16	0	106	3
