= Rhys Shirley =

English footballer (born 2003)

Personal information
- Full name: Rhys Bowles Shirley
- Date of birth: 18 January 2003 (age 23)
- Place of birth: Gunnislake, Cornwall, England
- Position: Forward

Youth career
- Plymouth Argyle

Senior career*
Years	Team	Apps	(Gls)
2021–2022	Plymouth Argyle	3	(0)
- * Club domestic league appearances and goals as of 14:33, 26 March 2022 (UTC)

Rhys Bowles Shirley (born 18 January 2003) is an English professional footballer who recently played as a forward for the EFL League One club Plymouth Argyle.

== Career ==
Shirley made his professional debut with Plymouth Argyle in a 2–0 EFL League One loss to Rotherham United on 7 August 2021.

He scored his first senior goal against Swansea City in the League Cup on 24 August 2021.

Shirley was released by Plymouth Argyle in July 2022.
