= 2026–27 Stevenage F.C. season =

51st season in existence of Stevenage FC

Stevenage
2026–27 season
- Chairman: Phil Wallace
- Manager: Alex Revell
- Stadium: Broadhall Way

The 2026–27 season is the 51st season in the history of Stevenage Football Club and their fourth consecutive season in League One. In addition to the domestic league, the club would also participate in the FA Cup, the EFL Cup, and the EFL Trophy.

== Transfers and contracts ==
=== In ===
Date	Pos.	Player	From	Fee	Ref.
1 July 2026 (Note: The transfer was announced on 27 June, and would become official on July 1 once Magennis' contract at Exeter City expired.)	CF	(Northern Ireland) Josh Magennis	(England) Exeter City	Free	
1 July 2026 (Note: The transfer was announced on 13 June, and would become official on July 1 once Sanderson's contract at Fulham expired.)	CF	(England) Olly Sanderson	(England) Fulham	Free	
1 July 2026 (Note: The transfer was announced on 26 June, and would become official on July 1 once Taylor's contract at Charlton Athletic expired.)	CDM	(Wales) Terry Taylor	(England) Charlton Athletic	Free	
25 July 2026	CB	(Guyana) Terence Vancooten	(England) Burton Albion	Undisclosed	
5 August 2026	GK	(Wales) Daniel Barden	(England) Norwich City	Free	
18 August 2026	CF	(Scotland) Michael Mellon	(England) Burnley	Undisclosed	
7 September 2026	CM	(England) Matt Smith	(England) Wigan Athletic	Free	
15 September 2026	RW	(Portugal) Wanya Marçal	(England) Leicester City	Free	

=== Loaned in ===
Date	Pos.	Player	From	Loaned until	Ref.
30 August 2026	LW	(England) Ben Broggio	(England) Aston Villa	End of Season	
1 September 2026	CB	(England) Kaelan Casey	(England) West Ham United	End of Season	
1 September 2026	GK	(England) Tommy Setford	(England) Arsenal	End of Season	
6 September 2026	CF	(Turkey) Tuğra Turhan	(Turkey) İstanbul Başakşehir	End of Season	

=== Loaned out ===
Date	Pos.	Player	To	Loaned until	Ref.
25 August 2026	CF	(England) Jovan Malcolm	(England) York City	2 January 2027	
1 September 2026	LB	(England) Dan Butler	(England) Swindon Town	End of Season	
1 September 2026	CB	(England) Jack Taylor	(England) Exeter City	End of Season	
8 September 2026	CM	(England) Joe Knight	(England) Sutton United	1 December 2026	

=== Out ===
Date	Pos.	Player	To	Fee	Ref.
31 August 2026	CF	(Northern Ireland) Jamie Reid	(England) Reading	Undisclosed	
1 September 2026	GK	(England) Filip Marschall	(England) Millwall	Undisclosed	

=== Released / Out of Contract ===
Date	Pos.	Player	Subsequent club	Joined date	Ref.
30 June 2026	GK	(England) Taye Ashby-Hammond	(England) Barnet	1 July 2026	
30 June 2026	CB	(England) Charlie Goode	(England) Milton Keynes Dons	1 July 2026	
30 June 2026	CB	(England) Dan Sweeney	(England) AFC Wimbledon	1 July 2026	
30 June 2026	CDM	(England) Harvey White	(England) Plymouth Argyle	1 July 2026	
30 June 2026	CB	(England) Ellis Bates	(England) Aveley	14 July 2026	
30 June 2026	CF	(Saint Kitts and Nevis) Tyreece Simpson	(England) Port Vale	4 August 2026	
30 June 2026	LW	(Democratic Republic of the Congo) Beryly Lubala	(England) Colchester United	25 September 2026	
30 June 2026	CAM	(Wales) Mathaeus Roberts			
30 June 2026	RW	(Scotland) Matt Phillips	Retired		

=== New Contract ===
Date	Pos.	Player	Contract expiry	Ref.
6 August 2026	LB	(England) Saxon Earley	Undisclosed	
6 November 2026	CM	(England) Tatenda Mutanga	Undisclosed (Note: First professional contract)	
9 November 2026	CB	(England) Carl Piergianni	Undisclosed	

== Pre-season and friendlies ==
On 26 May, Boro announced a pre-season tour to Alicante, Spain between 12–19 July, with a friendly against FC Andorra later confirmed. On 15 June, two friendlies against West Ham United and Colchester United was confirmed. A week later, a friendly against Millwall was added to the schedule.

Win Draw Loss Fixtures

18 July 2026 Friendly	FC Andorra	0–0	Stevenage	San Pedro del Pinatar, Spain
11:00 CEST				Stadium: Pinatar Arena

22 July 2026 Friendly	Stevenage	0–5	West Ham United	Stevenage
19:45 BST			Ward-Prowse 13'; Castellanos 25'; Orford 68'; Ajala 77'; Murphy 90+1'	Stadium: Stevenage FC Stadium

25 July 2026 Friendly	Stevenage	1–0	Millwall	Stevenage
15:00 BST	Trialist 48' (o.g.)	Report		Stadium: Stevenage FC Stadium

1 August 2026 Friendly	Stevenage	1–0	Colchester United	Stevenage
15:00 BST	Reid 19'		Raggett (red card) 15'	Stadium: Stevenage FC Stadium

== Competitions ==
=== League One ===
==== League table ====
Pos	Team	Pld	W	D	L	GF	GA	GD	Pts
12	Leyton Orient	14	6	2	6	23	15	+8	20
13	Mansfield Town	14	5	5	4	21	19	+2	20
14	Stevenage	13	5	4	4	18	13	+5	19
15	Wycombe Wanderers	14	4	6	4	24	27	−3	18
16	Burton Albion	16	4	5	7	21	29	−8	17

Updated to match(es) played on 21 November 2026. Source: EFL Official Website
Rules for classification: 1) Points; 2) Goal difference; 3) Number of goals scored; 4) Head-to-head results; 5) Wins; 6) Away goals; 7) Penalty points (sec 9.5); 8) 12-point sending off offences

==== Results summary ====
Overall								Home						Away					
Pld	W	D	L	GF	GA	GD	Pts	W	D	L	GF	GA	GD	W	D	L	GF	GA	GD
12	4	4	4	17	13	+4	16	3	1	2	9	6	+3	1	3	2	8	7	+1

Last updated: 31 October 2026.
Source: Soccerway

==== Matches ====
On 25 June, the League One fixtures were revealed.

Win Draw Loss Fixtures

15 August 2026 1	Burton Albion	1–1	Stevenage	Burton upon Trent
15:00 BST	Armer 74'		Sanderson 90+1'	Stadium: Pirelli Stadium; Attendance: 3,001; Referee: Martin Coy

22 August 2026 2	Stevenage	1–2	Oxford United	Stevenage
15:00 BST	Freestone (yellow card) 56'; Roberts 90+8'	Report	Helik (yellow card) 15'; Brannagan (yellow card) 60', (goal) 87' (pen.); O'Donkor 67'; Harris (yellow card) 76'; Mills (yellow card) 90+5'	Stadium: SPORTA Arena; Referee: James Oldham

29 August 2026 3	Stevenage	2–2	Doncaster Rovers	Stevenage
15:00 BST	Magennis 57'; Sanderson 82'	Report	Hutchinson (yellow card) 40'; McGrath (yellow card) 56'; Senior 70', (yellow card) 76'; Bailey 80'	Stadium: SPORTA Arena; Attendance: 3,139 (577 away); Referee: Oliver Yates

1 September 2026 4	Peterborough United	0–0	Stevenage	Peterborough
19:45 BST	Feeney (yellow card) 76'	Report	James-Wildin (yellow card) 62'	Stadium: Weston Homes Stadium; Attendance: 6,565; Referee: Darren Drysdale

5 September 2026 5	Barnsley	1–5	Stevenage	Barnsley
15:00 BST	McGeehan 17' (pen.); Kelly (yellow card) 85'		Piergianni (yellow card) 16'; Sanderson 43'; Kemp 52', 66'; Vancooten 57'; Earley (yellow card) 86'; Mellon 90+2'	Stadium: Oakwell; Attendance: 9,446; Referee: Neil Hair

10 September 2026 6	Stevenage	2–1	Luton Town	Stevenage
20:00 BST	Phillips (yellow card) 4'; Kemp 23', (yellow card) 44'; Freestone (yellow card) 26'; Magennis 70'; Earley (yellow card) 80'; James-Wildin (yellow card) 90+3'		Walsh (yellow card) 30'; Andersen 75', (yellow card) 90+5'	Stadium: SPORTA Arena; Attendance: 5,406; Referee: Ben Toner
Note: Fixture was initially scheduled for 12 September, but was rescheduled for live Sky Sports.

19 September 2026 7	Leyton Orient	1–0	Stevenage	Leyton
15:00 BST	Gilbert 79'	Report	Vancooten (yellow card) 31'; Freestone (yellow card) 32'; Thompson (yellow card) 59'; Phillips (yellow card) 65'	Stadium: BetWright Stadium; Attendance: 7,609 (549 away); Referee: Craig Hicks

10 October 2026 10	Stevenage	1–0	Wigan Athletic	Stevenage
15:00 BST	Marçal 60'		Burns (yellow card) 28'; Gray (yellow card) 53'; Walsh (yellow card) 69'; Carragher (yellow card) 90+4'	Stadium: SPORTA Arena; Referee: Abigail Byrne

17 October 2026 11	Bradford City	2–0	Stevenage	Bradford
15:00 BST	Sarcevic 79' (pen.); Connolly (yellow card) 81'; Swan 87'	Report	Phillips (yellow card) 79'	Stadium: Mbanq Valley Parade; Referee: Simon Mather

20 October 2026 12	Stevenage	3–0	Plymouth Argyle	Stevenage
19:45 BST	Thompson (yellow card) 7'; Mellon 19'; Magennis 27'; Patterson 83'	Report	Curtis (yellow card) 4'	Stadium: SPORTA Arena; Referee: Thomas Parsons

24 October 2026 13	Stevenage	0–1	Milton Keynes Dons	Stevenage
15:00 BST	Magennis (yellow card) 9'; Piergianni (yellow card) 35'	Report	Gilbey (yellow card) 7'; Collins (yellow card) 25'; Sanders (yellow card) 44'; Nombe 81'	Stadium: SPORTA Arena; Attendance: 4,042; Referee: Will Finnie

31 October 2026 14	Leicester City	2–2	Stevenage	Leicester
15:00 GMT	Braybrooke 2'; Doyle 66'	Report	Broggio 22'; Earley (yellow card) 30'; Turhan 78'	Stadium: King Power Stadium; Referee: Stephen Parkinson

14 November 2026 15	Stevenage	Postponed	Mansfield Town	Stevenage
15:00 GMT				Stadium: SPORTA Arena
Note: Fixture was postponed due to international call-ups.

21 November 2026 16	Notts County	0–1	Stevenage	Nottingham
15:00 GMT	Robertson (yellow card) 31'; Grant (penalty missed) 84'		Earley (yellow card) 34'; Piergianni (yellow card) 37'; Magennis 86'; Sanderson (yellow card) 90+4'	Stadium: Meadow Lane; Attendance: 10,769; Referee: Neil Hair

24 November 2026 8	Stevenage	v	Sheffield Wednesday	Stevenage
19:45 GMT				Stadium: SPORTA Arena
Note: Fixture was initially scheduled for 26 September, but was rearranged due to international call-ups.

28 November 2026 17	Stevenage	v	Blackpool	Stevenage
15:00 GMT				Stadium: SPORTA Arena

1 December 2026 18	Huddersfield Town	v	Stevenage	Huddersfield
19:45 GMT				Stadium: Accu Stadium

12 December 2026 19	Stevenage	v	Stockport County	Stevenage
12:30 GMT				Stadium: SPORTA Arena
Note: Fixture was initially scheduled for a 15:00 kick-off, but was brought forward for live Sky Sports broadcasting.

18 December 2026 20	Cambridge United	v	Stevenage	Cambridge
19:45 GMT				Stadium: Cledara Abbey Stadium
Note: Fixture was initially scheduled for 19 December, but was rescheduled for the night prior.

26 December 2026 21	Stevenage	v	Reading	Stevenage
15:00 GMT				Stadium: SPORTA Arena

29 December 2026 22	Wycombe Wanderers	v	Stevenage	High Wycombe
19:45 GMT				Stadium: Adams Park

1 January 2027 23	Bromley	v	Stevenage	Bromley
15:00 GMT				Stadium: Copperjax Community Stadium

9 January 2027 24	Stevenage	v	Cambridge United	Stevenage
12:30 GMT				Stadium: SPORTA Arena
Note: Fixture was initially scheduled for a 15:00 kick-off, but was brought forward for live Sky Sports broadcasting.

16 January 2027 25	Stevenage	v	Bradford City	Stevenage
15:00 GMT				Stadium: SPORTA Arena

19 January 2027 26	Plymouth Argyle	v	Stevenage	Plymouth
19:45 GMT				Stadium: Home Park

23 January 2027 27	Milton Keynes Dons	v	Stevenage	Denbigh
15:00 GMT				Stadium: Stadium MK

26 January 2027 9	AFC Wimbledon	v	Stevenage	Wimbledon
19:45 GMT				Stadium: The Cherry Red Records Stadium
Note: Fixture was originally scheduled for 3 October, but was postponed and later rearranged due to international call-ups.

=== FA Cup ===
Stevenage were drawn away to Oxford United in the first round and to Exeter City in the second round.

Win Draw Loss Fixtures

7 November 2026 First round	Oxford United	0–1	Stevenage	Littlemore
15:00 GMT	Goodrham (yellow card) 22'	Report	Piergianni 4', (yellow card) 48'; Earley (yellow card) 66'; Phillips (yellow card) 70'	Stadium: Kassam Stadium; Attendance: 2,885; Referee: Paul Howard

4–7 December 2026 Second round	Exeter City	v	Stevenage	Exeter
TBA GMT				Stadium: St James Park

=== EFL Cup ===
Stevenage were drawn away to Wycombe Wanderers in the first round and home to Reading in the second round.

7 August 2026 First round	Wycombe Wanderers	1–2	Stevenage	High Wycombe
19:45 BST	Onyedinma (yellow card) 33'; Henderson 39', (yellow card) 79'	Report	Roberts (yellow card) 22'; Kemp 27', (yellow card) 35'; James-Wildin (yellow card) 42'; Piergianni (yellow card) 69'; Magennis 90+5'	Stadium: Adams Park; Attendance: 2,510 (inc. 324 away); Referee: Jamie O'Connor

25 August 2026 Second round	Stevenage	0–3	Reading	Stevenage
19:45 BST			Brown 9'; Lane 24'; Williams 85'	Stadium: Stevenage FC Stadium; Attendance: 2,013; Referee: Richard Eley

=== EFL Trophy ===
==== Group stage ====
Stevenage were drawn against Leicester City, Walsall and Fulham U21 into Southern Group B.

Pos	Div	Team	Pld	W	PW	PL	L	GF	GA	GD	Pts	Qualification
1	L1	Stevenage	3	2	1	0	0	10	4	+6	8	Advance to Round 2
2	L1	Leicester City	3	2	0	0	1	9	4	+5	6	Advance to Round 2
3	L2	Walsall	3	1	0	0	2	5	10	−5	3	
4	ACA	Fulham U21	3	0	0	1	2	5	11	−6	1	

Source: EFL

Win Draw Loss Fixtures

22 September 2026 Group stage	Walsall	1–6	Stevenage	Bescot
19:00 BST	Simper 17'	Report	Mellon 11', 42', 58'; Marçal 29'; Houghton 32'; Broggio 63'	Stadium: Pallet-Track Bescot Stadium; Attendance: 1,205; Referee: Rob Massey-Ellis

6 October 2026 Group stage	Stevenage	2–1	Leicester City	Stevenage
19:00 BST	Marçal 24'; Sanderson 59'	Report	Riis 69'	Stadium: SPORTA Arena; Attendance: 2,162; Referee: Emily Heaslip

10 November 2026 Group stage	Stevenage	2-2 (4-3 SO)	Fulham U21	Stevenage
19:00 GMT	Mellon 22', 59'	Report	Works 37', 79'	Stadium: Stevenage FC Stadium; Attendance: 519; Referee: Matthew Scholes
	Shootout
	Michael Mellon (penalty scored) Oliver Sanderson (penalty scored) Tuğra Turhan (penalty scored) Wanya Marçal (penalty missed) Saxon Earley (penalty missed) Terry Taylor (penalty scored)		Dan Casey (penalty scored) Jose Sani (penalty scored) Alfie White (penalty scored) Khai Vally (penalty missed) Tarrell Cavell (penalty missed) Aidan Evans (penalty missed)

== Statistics ==
=== Appearances and goals ===
As of match played 10 November 2026

Players with no appearances are not included on the list; italics indicate loaned in player

No.	Pos	Nat	Player	Total		League One		FA Cup		EFL Cup		EFL Trophy	
No.	Pos	Nat	Player	Apps	Goals	Apps	Goals	Apps	Goals	Apps	Goals	Apps	Goals
1	GK	(England) ENG	Tommy Setford	9	0	8+0	0	1+0	0	0+0	0	0+0	0
2	DF	(Antigua and Barbuda) ANT	Luther James-Wildin	13	0	10+0	0	0+0	0	1+0	0	2+0	0
3	DF	(England) ENG	Dan Butler	1	0	0+0	0	0+0	0	1+0	0	0+0	0
4	MF	(England) ENG	Jordan Houghton	9	1	0+6	0	0+0	0	1+0	0	2+0	1
5	DF	(England) ENG	Carl Piergianni	18	1	12+0	0	1+0	1	1+1	0	3+0	0
6	DF	(England) ENG	Lewis Freestone	9	0	7+0	0	0+0	0	2+0	0	0+0	0
7	MF	(Wales) WAL	Terry Taylor	14	0	2+7	0	0+1	0	1+1	0	1+1	0
8	MF	(Trinidad and Tobago) TTO	Daniel Phillips	16	0	12+0	0	1+0	0	2+0	0	1+0	0
9	FW	(Northern Ireland) NIR	Josh Magennis	15	4	11+1	3	0+1	0	0+2	1	0+0	0
10	FW	(England) ENG	Dan Kemp	15	4	11+0	3	0+0	0	1+1	1	1+1	0
11	FW	(England) ENG	Jordan Roberts	8	1	4+2	1	0+0	0	2+0	0	0+0	0
12	GK	(Wales) WAL	Daniel Barden	3	0	1+0	0	0+0	0	0+0	0	2+0	0
14	DF	(England) ENG	Saxon Earley	15	0	6+4	0	1+0	0	0+1	0	3+0	0
15	DF	(Guyana) GUY	Terence Vancooten	15	1	12+0	1	1+0	0	2+0	0	0+0	0
16	DF	(England) ENG	Kaelan Casey	6	0	1+1	0	1+0	0	0+0	0	3+0	0
17	DF	(England) ENG	Jasper Pattenden	1	0	1+0	0	0+0	0	0+0	0	0+0	0
18	FW	(England) ENG	Olly Sanderson	17	4	7+5	3	1+0	0	1+1	0	1+1	1
19	FW	(Turkey) TUR	Tuğra Turhan	5	1	0+1	1	1+0	0	0+0	0	0+3	0
20	FW	(Wales) WAL	Chem Campbell	5	0	0+2	0	0+1	0	0+0	0	1+1	0
22	DF	(England) ENG	Jack Taylor	1	0	0+0	0	0+0	0	1+0	0	0+0	0
23	MF	(Wales) WAL	Louis Thompson	16	0	8+4	0	1+0	0	1+0	0	0+2	0
24	MF	(England) ENG	Matt Smith	8	0	2+3	0	0+0	0	0+0	0	3+0	0
25	FW	(Portugal) POR	Wanya Marçal	6	3	2+0	1	0+1	0	0+0	0	2+1	2
26	MF	(England) ENG	Joe Knight	1	0	0+0	0	0+0	0	0+1	0	0+0	0
27	FW	(England) ENG	Ben Broggio	12	2	4+5	1	1+0	0	0+0	0	1+1	1
28	FW	(Scotland) SCO	Michael Mellon	14	7	2+8	2	0+1	0	0+1	0	2+0	5
36	GK	(England) ENG	Max Woodford	1	0	0+0	0	0+0	0	0+0	0	1+0	0
37	MF	(England) ENG	Tatenda Mutanga	1	0	0+0	0	0+0	0	0+0	0	0+1	0
38	FW	(England) ENG	Samuel Ayolie	1	0	0+0	0	0+0	0	0+0	0	0+1	0
39	DF	(England) ENG	Alfie Thornett	2	0	0+0	0	0+0	0	0+0	0	0+2	0
43	MF	(England) ENG	Charlie Brown	1	0	0+0	0	0+0	0	0+0	0	1+0	0
44	MF	(Scotland) SCO	Phoenix Patterson	16	1	4+6	1	1+0	0	2+0	0	3+0	0
Players who featured but departed the club permanently during the season:
1	GK	(England) ENG	Filip Marschall	5	0	3+0	0	0+0	0	2+0	0	0+0	0
19	FW	(Northern Ireland) NIR	Jamie Reid	3	0	2+0	0	0+0	0	1+0	0	0+0	0

=== Disciplinary record ===
As of match played 10 November 2026

Includes all competitive matches. The list is sorted by squad number when disciplinary points / points per card / number of cards are equal. Players with no cards not included in the list.

Rank	No.	Pos.	Nat.	Name	League One			FA Cup			EFL Cup			EFL Trophy			Total		
Rank	No.	Pos.	Nat.	Name	Yellow card	Second yellow card	Red card	Yellow card	Second yellow card	Red card	Yellow card	Second yellow card	Red card	Yellow card	Second yellow card	Red card	Yellow card	Second yellow card	Red card
1	5	CB	(England)	Carl Piergianni	2	0	0	1	0	0	2	0	0	1	0	0	6	0	0
2	8	CDM	(Trinidad and Tobago)	Daniel Phillips	3	0	0	1	0	0	0	0	0	1	0	0	5	0	0
3	16	LB	(England)	Lewis Freestone	4	0	0	0	0	0	0	0	0	0	0	0	4	0	0
4	2	RB	(Antigua and Barbuda)	Luther James-Wildin	2	0	0	0	0	0	1	0	0	0	0	0	3	0	0
4	14	LB	(England)	Saxon Earley	2	0	0	1	0	0	0	0	0	0	0	0	3	0	0
6	10	LW	(England)	Dan Kemp	1	0	0	0	0	0	1	0	0	0	0	0	2	0	0
6	23	CM	(Wales)	Louis Thompson	2	0	0	0	0	0	0	0	0	0	0	0	2	0	0
8	3	LB	(England)	Dan Butler	0	0	0	0	0	0	1	0	0	0	0	0	1	0	0
8	9	CF	(Northern Ireland)	Josh Magennis	1	0	0	0	0	0	0	0	0	0	0	0	1	0	0
8	11	LW	(England)	Jordan Roberts	0	0	0	0	0	0	1	0	0	0	0	0	1	0	0
8	15	CB	(Guyana)	Terence Vancooten	1	0	0	0	0	0	0	0	0	0	0	0	1	0	0
8	16	CB	(England)	Kaelan Casey	0	0	0	0	0	0	0	0	0	1	0	0	1	0	0
8	39	CB	(England)	Alfie Thornett	0	0	0	0	0	0	0	0	0	1	0	0	1	0	0
Total					18	0	0	3	0	0	6	0	0	4	0	0	31	0	0

== Awards ==
=== Player awards ===
==== EFL League One Player of the Month ====
Month	Manager	Result	Ref.
September	(England) Dan Kemp	Nominated	

==== PFA League One Fans' Player of the Month ====
Month	Manager	Result	Ref.
September	(England) Dan Kemp	Nominated	
