= Ryan Doherty (footballer) =

English association football player

Personal information
- Full name: Ryan Sean Doherty
- Date of birth: 26 August 2008 (age 18)
- Position: Central midfielder

Team information
- Current team: Ipswich Town

Youth career
- 2015–2024: Stevenage

Senior career*
Years	Team	Apps	(Gls)
2024–2026	Stevenage	3	(0)
2025	→ Potters Bar Town (loan)	5	(0)
2026–	Ipswich Town	0	(0)
- * Club domestic league appearances and goals as of 17:11, 30 January 2026 (UTC)

Ryan Sean Doherty (born 26 August 2008) is an English professional footballer who plays as a central midfielder for Premier League club Ipswich Town.

== Career ==
=== Stevenage ===
Doherty joined Stevenage's academy at under-8 level and progressed through the club's youth system. He signed a scholarship agreement in July 2024 and made his senior debut as a first-year scholar, appearing as a second-half substitute in a 2–0 EFL Trophy defeat to Peterborough United on 8 October 2024. At 16 years and 43 days old, he became Stevenage's youngest ever starter and youngest outfield player.

Doherty joined Isthmian League Premier Division club Potters Bar Town on loan on 4 January 2025, making five appearances before being recalled by Stevenage on 1 February 2025. He signed his first professional contract with the club on 27 August 2025.

=== Ipswich Town ===
Having made 11 first-team appearances for Stevenage, Doherty signed for EFL Championship club Ipswich Town on 2 February 2026. The transfer involved a "significant six-figure fee" plus add-ons.

== Career statistics ==
As of match played 20 December 2025

Appearances and goals by club, season and competition
Club	Season	League			FA Cup		EFL Cup		Other		Total	
Club	Season	Division	Apps	Goals	Apps	Goals	Apps	Goals	Apps	Goals	Apps	Goals
Stevenage	2024–25	League One	0	0	0	0	0	0	3 (Note: Appearances in EFL Trophy)	0	3	0
Stevenage	2025–26	League One	3	0	0	0	1	0	4	0	8	0
Stevenage	Total		3	0	0	0	1	0	7	0	11	0
Potters Bar Town	2024–25	Isthmian League Premier Division	5	0	—		—		0	0	5	0
Career total			8	0	0	0	1	0	7	0	16	0
