= Lewis Freestone =

English footballer

Personal information
- Full name: Lewis Jay Freestone
- Date of birth: 26 October 1999 (age 27)
- Place of birth: Kings Lynn, England
- Height: 1.87 m (6 ft 2 in)
- Position: Centre back

Team information
- Current team: Stevenage
- Number: 6

Youth career
- –2016: Peterborough United

Senior career*
Years	Team	Apps	(Gls)
2016–2019	Peterborough United	8	(0)
2016–2017	→ Cambridge City (loan)	5	(0)
2017	→ St Albans City (loan)	2	(0)
2017	→ Guiseley (loan)	2	(0)
2018	→ Nuneaton Borough (loan)	8	(0)
2019	→ Bedford Town (loan)	3	(0)
2019–2020	Brighton & Hove Albion	0	(0)
2020–2024	Cheltenham Town	105	(1)
2024–	Stevenage	60	(2)
- * Club domestic league appearances and goals as of 23 August 2026 (UTC)

Lewis Jay Freestone (born 26 October 1999) is an English professional footballer who plays as a defender for EFL League One club Stevenage.

== Career ==
=== Peterborough United ===
He started his football career with Peterborough United and made his league debut on 14 April 2017 in a 2–1 defeat against Fleetwood Town in League One.

On 4 January 2019 Freestone was loaned out to Bedford Town for a month.

He was released by Peterborough United at the end of the 2018–19 season.

=== Brighton & Hove Albion ===
On 29 July 2019 Freestone signed a one-year contract with the Under-23 development squad at Premier League side Brighton & Hove Albion. At the end of the season, Freestone announced on his personal Twitter page that he was leaving at the expiration of his contract.

=== Cheltenham Town ===
On 1 August 2020, it was announced that Freestone had joined League Two side Cheltenham Town. He made his debut for Cheltenham in a EFL Cup first round away win over his former club, Peterborough United on 5 September 2020.

On 28 July 2022, Freestone signed a contract extension to keep him at the club until 2025.

Freestone made his one hundredth league appearance for Cheltenham in a 2–0 defeat to Wycombe Wanderers on the 27 February 2024.

== Career statistics ==
As of match played 25 August 2026

Appearances and goals by club, season and competition
Club	Season	League			FA Cup		EFL Cup		Other		Total	
Club	Season	Division	Apps	Goals	Apps	Goals	Apps	Goals	Apps	Goals	Apps	Goals
Peterborough United	2016–17	League One	4	0	0	0	0	0	0	0	4	0
Peterborough United	2017–18	League One	4	0	0	0	0	0	0	0	4	0
Peterborough United	2018–19	League One	0	0	0	0	0	0	0	0	0	0
Peterborough United	Total		8	0	0	0	0	0	0	0	8	0
Cambridge City (loan)	2016–17	SL Premier Division	5	0	0	0	—		0	0	5	0
St Albans City (loan)	2016–17	National League South	2	0	0	0	—		0	0	2	0
Guiseley (loan)	2017–18	National League	2	0	0	0	—		0	0	2	0
Nuneaton Borough (loan)	2018–19	National League North	8	0	0	0	—		0	0	8	0
Bedford Town (loan)	2018–19	SL Premier Division Central	3	0	0	0	—		1 (Note: Appearance in FA Trophy)	0	4	0
Brighton & Hove Albion U23	2019–20	—			—		—		1 (Note: Appearance(s) in EFL Trophy)	0	1	0
Cheltenham Town	2020–21	League Two	14	0	4	0	1	0	4	0	23	0
Cheltenham Town	2021–22	League One	28	1	2	0	3	0	3	0	36	1
Cheltenham Town	2022–23	League One	29	0	1	0	0	0	4	0	34	0
Cheltenham Town	2023–24	League One	34	0	1	0	1	0	0	0	36	0
Cheltenham Town	Total		105	1	8	0	5	0	11	0	129	1
Stevenage	2024–25	League One	26	0	1	0	1	0	6	1	34	1
Stevenage	2025–26	League One	32	2	0	0	1	1	2	0	35	3
Stevenage	2026–27	League One	2	0	0	0	2	0	0	0	4	0
Stevenage	Total		60	2	1	0	4	1	8	1	73	4
Career total			193	3	9	0	9	1	21	1	232	5

== Honours ==
Cheltenham Town

- EFL League Two: 2020–21
