= Felix Miles =

English footballer

Personal information
- Date of birth: 26 September 2003 (age 23)
- Place of birth: Bisley, England
- Position: Midfielder

Youth career
- Cheltenham Town

Senior career*
Years	Team	Apps	(Gls)
2020–2022	Cheltenham Town	4	(1)
2020	→ Tuffley Rovers (loan)	0	(0)
2022–2023	Stratford Town		
2022	→ Cinderford Town (loan)	26	(13)
2023	Gloucester City	0	(0)
2024–2026	Worcester City	57	(16)
2026	→ Alvechurch (loan)	16	(5)
- * Club domestic league appearances and goals as of 22:57, 28 April 2026 (UTC)

Felix Miles (born 26 September 2003) is an English footballer who most recently played as a midfielder for Southern League Premier Division Central club Worcester City.

== Playing career ==
Miles came through the youth-team at Cheltenham Town. On 23 October 2020, he joined Hellenic League Premier Division club Tuffley Rovers on loan. He made his first-team debut for Cheltenham Town in a 3–0 defeat at home to Portsmouth in the EFL Trophy on 8 December 2020. In April 2021, Miles won the EFL Apprentice of the Year League Two award for 2021. During the 2021–22 season, Miles spent time on trial with Southampton and Birmingham City. On 6 May 2022, Miles was released by Cheltenham Town at the end of his scholarship.

In August 2022, he signed for Southern Premier Division outfit Stratford Town. In November 2022, he dropped one level to sign for Southern League Division One South club Cinderford Town on loan until the end of the 2022-23 season, scoring twice on his debut for Alex Sykes' side. He ended the season as Cinderford's top scorer and their player of the season. He signed for Gloucester City in the summer of 2023.

== Statistics ==
As of end of 2021–22 season

Appearances and goals by club, season and competition
Club	Season	League			FA Cup		EFL Cup		Other		Total	
Club	Season	Division	Apps	Goals	Apps	Goals	Apps	Goals	Apps	Goals	Apps	Goals
Cheltenham Town	2020–21	EFL League Two	0	0	0	0	0	0	1 (Note: Appearance(s) in the EFL Trophy)	0	1	0
Cheltenham Town	2021–22	EFL League One	0	0	0	0	0	0	3	1	3	1
Cheltenham Town	Total		0	0	0	0	0	0	4	1	4	1
Career total			0	0	0	0	0	0	4	1	4	1

== Honours ==
- EFL Apprentice of the Year League Two: 2021
