= Wanya Marçal =

Anglo-Portuguese footballer (born 2002)

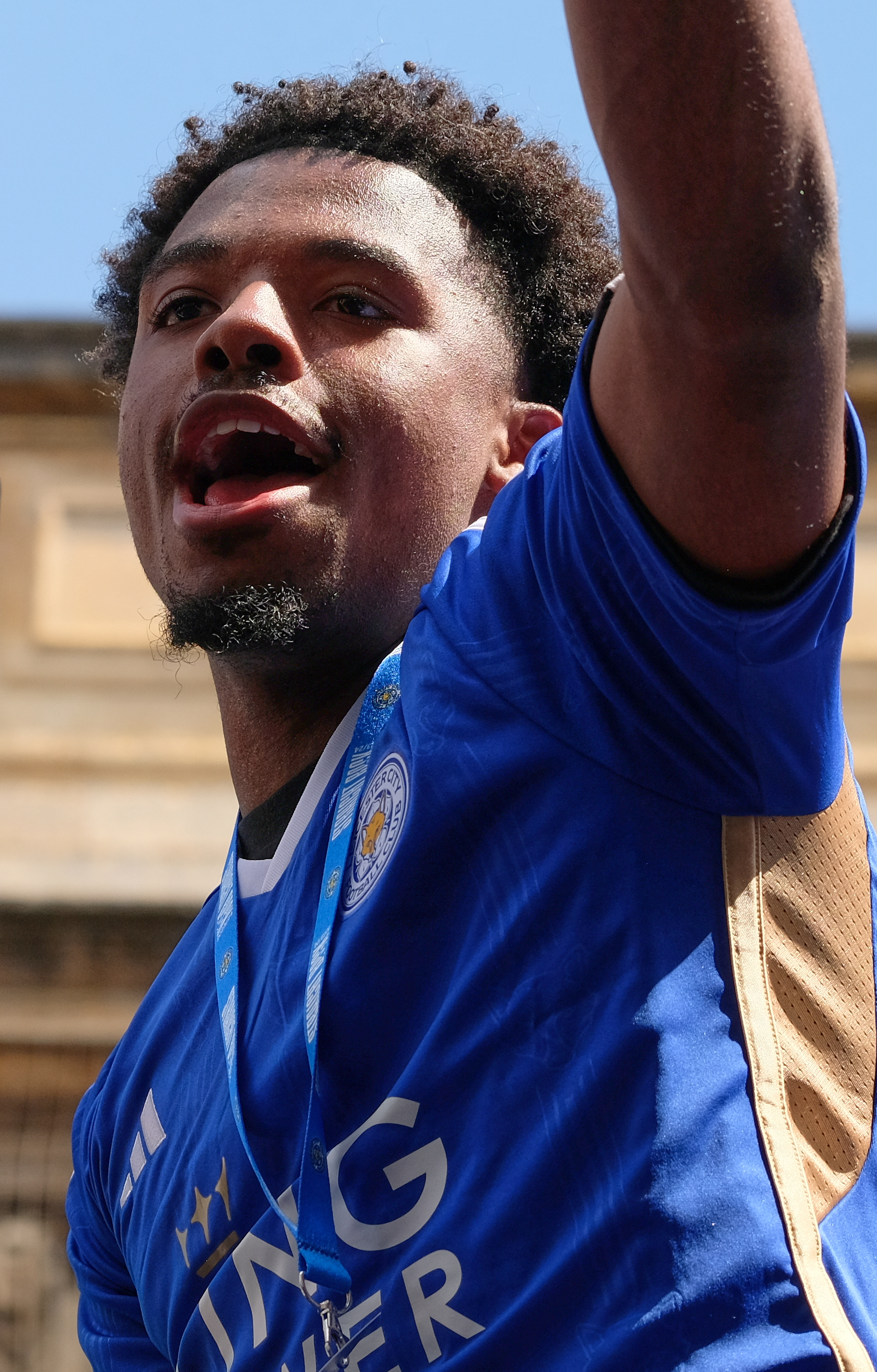
- Wanya Marçal during Leicester City's 2024 Championship winning celebrations

Personal information
- Full name: Wanya Marçal-Madivadua
- Date of birth: 19 October 2002 (age 24)
- Place of birth: Leicester, England
- Height: 1.81 m (5 ft 11 in)
- Positions: Attacking midfielder; winger

Team information
- Current team: Stevenage
- Number: 25

Youth career
- Feeder Soccer
- 2013–2015: Peterborough United
- 2015–2022: Leicester City

Senior career*
Years	Team	Apps	(Gls)
2022–2026	Leicester City	3	(1)
2024–2025	→ De Graafschap (loan)	12	(1)
2026–	Stevenage	3	(3)

International career
2021–2022	Portugal U20	4	(0)
- * Club domestic league appearances and goals as of 11 May 2025

Wanya Marçal-Madivadua (born 19 October 2002) is a professional footballer who plays as an attacking midfielder or winger for EFL League One club Stevenage. Born in England, he has represented Portugal at youth international level.

== Early life ==
Marçal was born in Portugal, but grew up in Peterborough with his mother and step-father. He is the eldest of four siblings, with his step-brother Cheyenne Loureiro, as well as his brother, Luegi, playing for Leicester City, while his other step-brother, Giovanni Loureiro, also played for the club before moving on to Bolton Wanderers.

== Club career ==
=== Early career ===
Initially playing football in a local park with his brothers, Marçal joined a local academy named Feeder Soccer, before being scouted and signed by professional side Peterborough United at the age of ten.

=== Leicester City ===
His step-brother, Giovanni, had joined the Academy of Leicester City, and was shortly followed by Marçal, who joined the club in 2015, at the age of 12. Having progressed through the Academy, he signed a professional contract with the club in July 2021, despite interest from a number of clubs across Europe, and was promoted to the first-team squad. On 8 January 2022, Marçal made his professional debut with Leicester City in a 4–1 FA Cup win over Watford, coming on as a half-time substitute for Vontae Daley-Campbell.

Ahead of the 2023–24 season, Marçal signed a contract extension with the club. Under new manager Enzo Maresca, Marçal featured in all of Leicester City's pre-season games, including travelling with the first-team squad to Thailand and Singapore. Following the loss of a number of first-team players due to Leicester City's relegation from the Premier League, he was handed his league debut in the EFL Championship, starting in a 1–0 win against Huddersfield Town on 12 August 2023. The following Saturday, he scored his first professional goal in a 2–1 win over Cardiff City, volleying past goalkeeper Jak Alnwick following a headed clearance by a Cardiff City defender from a Leicester City corner. Despite his bright start to the season, he was dropped for the following game away at Rotherham United, with Leicester manager Maresca, who opted to have two goalkeepers on the bench instead, stating that Marçal needed to "earn" his place in the team.

On 22 December 2023, Marçal extended his contract with Leicester until the summer of 2026.

==== Loan to De Graafschap ====
On 30 August 2024, Marçal joined Dutch second-tier club De Graafschap in the Netherlands on a season-long loan. He made his club debut on 1 December, coming on as a 63rd-minute substitute for Jesse van de Haar in a 3–1 win against VVV. He scored his first goal for the club on 28 April 2025, in the 58th minute of a 3–1 away defeat against VVV.

=== Stevenage ===
On 15 September 2026, Marçal joined League One club Stevenage. On 22 September 2026, Marçal made his Stevenage debut, scoring and assisting in an EFL Trophy match against League Two club Walsall. On 6 October 2026, Marçal scored in an EFL Trophy game against his former club, Leicester City.

== International career ==
Born in England, Marçal is of Portuguese and Angolan descent. He is a youth international for Portugal, having represented the Portugal U20s.

== Career statistics ==
As of 22 September 2026

Appearances and goals by club, season and competition
Club	Season	League			National cup (Note: Includes FA Cup, KNVB Cup)		League cup (Note: Includes EFL Cup)		Europe		Other		Total	
Club	Season	Division	Apps	Goals	Apps	Goals	Apps	Goals	Apps	Goals	Apps	Goals	Apps	Goals
Leicester City U21	2021–22	—			—		—		—		2 (Note: Appearance(s) in EFL Trophy)	0	2	0
Leicester City U21	2022–23	—			—		—		—		1	0	1	0
Leicester City U21	2023–24	—			—		—		—		3	1	3	1
Leicester City U21	Total		—		—		—		—		6	1	6	1
Leicester City	2021–22	Premier League	0	0	1	0	0	0	0	0	0	0	1	0
Leicester City	2023–24	Championship	3	1	3	0	2	0	—		—		8	1
Leicester City	2025–26	Championship	0	0	1	0	0	0	—		0	0	1	0
Leicester City	Total		3	1	5	0	2	0	0	0	0	0	10	1
De Graafschap (loan)	2024–25	Eerste Divisie	11	1	1	0	—		—		—		12	1
Stevenage	2026–27	League One	0	0	0	0	0	0	0	0	1	1	1	1
Career total			14	2	6	0	2	0	0	0	7	2	29	4

== Honours ==
Leicester City

- EFL Championship: 2023–24
