= Phoenix Patterson =

English association football player

Personal information
- Full name: Phoenix Maclaren Patterson
- Date of birth: 1 September 2000 (age 26)
- Place of birth: High Wycombe, England
- Height: 1.78 m (5 ft 10 in)
- Position: Forward

Team information
- Current team: Stevenage
- Number: 44

Youth career
- Wycombe Wanderers
- 2016–2020: Tottenham Hotspur
- 2020–2021: Watford

Senior career*
Years	Team	Apps	(Gls)
2021–2022	Waterford	46	(21)
2023–2025	Fleetwood Town	91	(6)
2025–	Stevenage	38	(2)

International career
2018	Scotland U19	2	(0)
- * Club domestic league appearances and goals as of 12:27, 22 November 2026 (UTC)

Phoenix Maclaren Patterson (born 1 September 2000) is a professional footballer who plays as a forward for Stevenage.

Born in England, he played for Scotland at youth international level.

== Club career ==
Patterson was born in High Wycombe, Buckinghamshire and attended John Hampden Grammar School. While there he joined the academy at Wycombe Wanderers before moving to London to join the Tottenham Hotspur youth system. Spurs released the player in July 2020. In December 2020 Patterson joined Watford academy.

In 2021 he then moved to Irish club Waterford. With Waterford he won the League of Ireland Player of the Month award for September 2021, and the 2021 First Division Player of the Year award. He also played for them in the 2021 play-offs.

It was announced in December 2022 that he would sign for EFL League One club Fleetwood Town in January 2023. On 7 January 2023, Patterson made his first senior appearance in English football, as a substitute in a 2–1 FA Cup victory over Queens Park Rangers.

On 7 May 2025, the club announced it had activated a one-year extension for the player. In June 2025, Patterson was sold to Stevenage for an undisclosed fee.

== International career ==
Patterson made two appearances for the Scotland under-19 team in 2018.

== Personal life ==
He was named after actor River Phoenix. His mother is Filipina and his father is half English and Scottish.

== Career statistics ==
As of match played on 21 November 2026

Appearances and goals by club, season and competition
Club	Season	League			National Cup		League Cup		Other		Total	
Club	Season	Division	Apps	Goals	Apps	Goals	Apps	Goals	Apps	Goals	Apps	Goals
Tottenham Hotspur	2018–19	Premier League	0	0	0	0	0	0	1 (Note: Appearance(s) in EFL Trophy)	1	1	1
Tottenham Hotspur	2019–20	Premier League	0	0	0	0	0	0	3	0	3	0
Tottenham Hotspur	Total		0	0	0	0	0	0	4	1	4	1
Waterford	2021	LOI Premier Division	15	4	3	2	—		1 (Note: Appearance(s) in League of Ireland promotion/relegation play-offs)	0	19	6
Waterford	2022	LOI First Division	31	17	3	2	—		5	3	39	22
Waterford	Total		46	21	6	4	0	0	6	3	58	28
Fleetwood Town	2022–23	League One	18	1	2	0	0	0	0	0	20	1
Fleetwood Town	2023–24	League One	34	2	2	0	0	0	2	1	38	3
Fleetwood Town	2024–25	League Two	39	3	1	0	3	0	3	0	46	3
Fleetwood Town	Total		91	6	5	0	3	0	5	1	104	7
Stevenage	2025–26	League One	27	1	1	0	1	0	6 (Note: Four appearances in the EFL Trophy, two appearances in the play-offs)	3	35	4
Stevenage	2026–27	League One	11	1	1	0	2	0	3	0	17	1
Stevenage	Total		38	2	2	0	3	0	9	3	52	5
Career total			175	29	13	4	6	0	25	8	217	41

== Honours ==
Individual

- League of Ireland Premier Division Player of the Month: September 2022,
