= 2021–22 Cheltenham Town F.C. season =

Cheltenham Town
2021–22 season
- Chairman: David Bloxham
- Manager: Michael Duff
- Stadium: Whaddon Road
- League One: 15th
- FA Cup: Second round
- EFL Cup: Third round
- EFL Trophy: Group stage
- Top goalscorer: League: Alfie May (23); All: Alfie May (26)
Home colours	Away colours	Third colours

The 2021–22 season was Cheltenham Town's 135th year in their history and first season back in League One since the 2008–09 season following promotion last season. Along with the league, the club also competed in the FA Cup, the EFL Cup and the EFL Trophy. The season covers the period from 1 July 2021 to 30 June 2022.

== Pre-season friendlies ==
Cheltenham Town announced they would play friendlies against Cinderford Town, Evesham United, Birmingham City, Kidderminster Harriers, Coventry City, Hungerford Town, Hereford and Walsall as part of their pre-season preparations.

10 July 2021 Friendly	Cinderford Town	0–3	Cheltenham Town	Cinderford
15:00 BST		Report	Williams 36', 49'; Miles 59'	Stadium: Causeway Stadium

13 July 2021 Friendly	Evesham United	0–3	Cheltenham Town	Evesham
19:30 BST		Report	Sercombe 2' (pen.); Mace 21' (o.g.); Miles 75'	Stadium: The Spiers & Hartwell Jubilee Stadium; Referee: Neil Pratt

17 July 2021 Friendly	Cheltenham Town	0–3	Birmingham City	Cheltenham
15:00 BST		Report	Gardner 6'; Hogan 37'; Leko 82'	Stadium: Jonny-Rocks Stadium

20 July 2021 Friendly	Kidderminster Harriers	1–2	Cheltenham Town	Kidderminster
19:00 BST	Tolley 29'	Report	Abraham 33', 89'	Stadium: Aggborough Stadium; Attendance: 979; Referee: Tom Reeves

24 July 2021 Friendly	Cheltenham Town	2–0	Coventry City	Cheltenham
15:00 BST	Williams 22', 86'	Report		Stadium: Jonny-Rocks Stadium; Attendance: 1,174

27 July 2021 Friendly	Hungerford Town	Cancelled	Cheltenham Town	Hungerford
19:30 BST				Stadium: Bulpit Lane
Note: Match was cancelled due to COVID-19 and injuries.

27 July 2021 Friendly	Hereford	1–8	Cheltenham Town	Hereford
19:45 BST	Haines (red card) 11'; Pollock 90'	Report	Williams 9', 14', 72'; May 17', 47', 52'; Sercombe 41'; Armitage 89'	Stadium: Edgar Street; Attendance: 894

31 July 2021 Friendly	Cheltenham Town	2–0	Walsall	Cheltenham
15:00 BST	Blair 50'; Raglan 67'	Report		Stadium: Jonny-Rocks Stadium; Attendance: 930; Referee: Kevin Johnson

== Competitions ==
=== League One ===
==== League table ====
Pos	Team	Pld	W	D	L	GF	GA	GD	Pts
11	Ipswich Town	46	18	16	12	67	46	+21	70
12	Accrington Stanley	46	17	10	19	61	80	−19	61
13	Charlton Athletic	46	17	8	21	55	59	−4	59
14	Cambridge United	46	15	13	18	56	74	−18	58
15	Cheltenham Town	46	13	17	16	66	80	−14	56
16	Burton Albion	46	14	11	21	51	67	−16	53
17	Lincoln City	46	14	10	22	55	63	−8	52
18	Shrewsbury Town	46	12	14	20	47	51	−4	50
19	Morecambe	46	10	12	24	57	88	−31	42

Source: EFL Official Website
Rules for classification: 1) Points; 2) Goal difference; 3) Number of goals scored; 4) Head-to-head results; 5) Wins; 6) Away goals; 7) Penalty points based on yellow and red cards received excluding the last four games of the season (sec 9.5); 8) 12-point sending off offences; 9) If the tie affects the automatic promotion or relegation places, a play-off game or games would be held between the two tied teams

==== Results summary ====
Overall								Home						Away					
Pld	W	D	L	GF	GA	GD	Pts	W	D	L	GF	GA	GD	W	D	L	GF	GA	GD
46	13	17	16	66	80	−14	56	10	7	6	33	30	+3	3	10	10	33	50	−17

Last updated: 30 April 2022.

==== Results by matchday ====
Matchday	1	2	3	4	5	6	7	8	9	10	11	12	13	14	15	16	17	18	19	20	21	22	23	24	25	26	27	28	29	30	31	32	33	34	35	36	37	38	39	40	41	42	43	44	45	46
Ground	A	H	H	A	A	H	A	H	A	A	H	H	H	A	H	A	H	A	A	H	H	A	H	A	H	H	A	H	A	H	H	A	A	H	H	A	A	H	A	A	A	H	H	A	H	A
Result	D	L	W	L	D	D	W	W	L	L	L	W	W	L	D	D	W	W	D	L	D	L	L	D	D	D	L	D	D	W	W	D	D	L	W	L	W	W	L	L	D	W	D	L	L	D
Position	12	20	15	18	17	16	14	9	14	16	17	14	12	13	16	15	11	10	11	12	14	14	14	14	13	13	17	17	16	16	15	15	15	15	14	14	13	12	12	12	12	12	12	14	15	15

Updated to match(es) played on 30 April 2022. Source: Statto.com
A = Away; H = Home; W = Win; D = Draw; L = Loss

==== Matches ====
Cheltenham Town's fixtures were announced on 24 June 2021.

7 August 2021 1	Crewe Alexandra	1–1	Cheltenham Town	Crewe
15:00 BST	Mandron 28'; Ramsay (yellow card) 65'	Report	Williams 40', (yellow card) 45+1'	Stadium: Mornflake Stadium; Attendance: 5,301; Referee: Ben Toner

14 August 2021 2	Cheltenham Town	1–3	Wycombe Wanderers	Cheltenham
15:00 BST	Williams 45'; Chapman (yellow card) 61'; Hussey (yellow card) 90+5'	Report	Vokes 14'; Pendlebury 74', 79'	Stadium: Jonny-Rocks Stadium; Attendance: 3,860; Referee: Carl Boyeson

17 August 2021 3	Cheltenham Town	2–1	Ipswich Town	Cheltenham
19:45 BST	Raglan (yellow card) 15'; Wright (yellow card) 29', (goal) 62'; Thomas (yellow card) 64'; Boyle 81'	Report	Penney 9'; Evans (yellow card) 27'	Stadium: Jonny-Rocks Stadium; Attendance: 4,746; Referee: Peter Wright

21 August 2021 4	Fleetwood Town	3–2	Cheltenham Town	Fleetwood
15:00 BST	Clarke 33'; Johnson 81'; Morris 90'; Morton (yellow card) 90+3'	Report	Wright 8', (yellow card) 83'; Raglan (yellow card) 36'; Thomas (yellow card) 46'; Hussey (yellow card) 86'; May 87'	Stadium: Highbury Stadium; Referee: Andy Haines

27 August 2021 5	Burton Albion	1–1	Cheltenham Town	Burton upon Trent
19:45 BST	Akins 67'; Hamer (yellow card) 82'; Brayford (yellow card) 90+2'	Report	Wright 28'; Lloyd (yellow card) 64'	Stadium: Pirelli Stadium; Attendance: 2,909; Referee: Scott Oldham

4 September 2021 6	Cheltenham Town	1–1	Milton Keynes Dons	Cheltenham
15:00 BST	Joseph 14'; Blair (yellow card) 39'; Hussey (yellow card) 45'; Freestone (yellow card) 84'	Report	Darling (yellow card) 61'; Boateng 87', (yellow card) 87'	Stadium: Jonny-Rocks Stadium; Attendance: 3,704; Referee: Sam Allison

11 September 2021 7	Charlton Athletic	1–2	Cheltenham Town	Charlton
15:00 BST	Leko 59'; Famewo (yellow card) 87'; Stockley (yellow card) 90+3'	Report	Blair 6'; Perry 33'; Long (yellow card) 90+3'	Stadium: The Valley; Referee: Andy Davies

18 September 2021 8	Cheltenham Town	1–0	Oxford United	Cheltenham
15:00 BST	Thomas (yellow card) 65'; May 68'; Blair (yellow card) 88'	Report	Long (yellow card) 90+4'	Stadium: Jonny-Rocks Stadium; Attendance: 5,004; Referee: Paul Howard

25 September 2021 9	Wigan Athletic	2–0	Cheltenham Town	Wigan
15:00 BST	Lang 8', (yellow card) 65'; Cousins (yellow card) 25'; Wyke 46'; Keane (yellow card) 68'	Report		Stadium: DW Stadium; Attendance: 8,867; Referee: Josh Smith

28 September 2021 10	Sunderland	5–0	Cheltenham Town	Sunderland
19:45 BST	Wright 11'; Stewart 28', 38'; O'Nien 65'; Dajaku 66'	Report	Freestone (yellow card) 30'; May (yellow card) 52'; Thomas (yellow card) 81'	Stadium: Stadium of Light; Attendance: 28,313; Referee: Chris Sarginson

2 October 2021 11	Cheltenham Town	0–2	Rotherham United	Cheltenham
15:00 BST		Report	Grigg 51'; Edmonds-Green 75'	Stadium: Jonny-Rocks Stadium; Attendance: 3,748; Referee: Darren Drysdale

16 October 2021 12	Cheltenham Town	1–0	Accrington Stanley	Cheltenham
15:00 BST	Vassell 79'; Boyle (yellow card) 85'; Blair (yellow card) 89'	Report	Amankwah (yellow card) 71'	Stadium: Jonny-Rocks Stadium; Attendance: 3,437; Referee: James Oldham

19 October 2021 13	Cheltenham Town	3–1	Morecambe	Cheltenham
19:45 GMT	Sercombe 26'; Joseph 65', 68'	Report	Phillips 38'; O'Connor (yellow card) 52'; Gnahoua (yellow card) 74'	Stadium: Jonny-Rocks Stadium; Attendance: 2,909; Referee: Ben Speedie

23 October 2021 14	Doncaster Rovers	3–2	Cheltenham Town	Doncaster
15:00 BST	Dodoo 23'; Anderson 45+1'; Vilca 54'; Dahlberg (yellow card) 87'	Report	Sercombe (penalty missed) 62'; May 68'; Williams 90+1'	Stadium: Keepmoat Stadium; Attendance: 6,101; Referee: Neil Hair

30 October 2021 15	Cheltenham Town	2–2	Sheffield Wednesday	Cheltenham
15:00 BST	Vassell 14', (yellow card) 75'; Blair 90+1'; May (yellow card) 90+3'	Report	Bannan (yellow card) 32'; Dunkley 65'; Blair 82' (o.g.); Johnson (yellow card) 90+3'	Stadium: Jonny-Rocks Stadium; Attendance: 5,582; Referee: Charles Breakspear

2 November 2021 16	Portsmouth	1–1	Cheltenham Town	Milton
19:45 GMT	Hackett-Fairchild 32'; Williams (yellow card) 78'; Morrell (yellow card) 81'	Report	Freestone 6'; Hussey (yellow card) 49'; Crowley (yellow card) 90'	Stadium: Fratton Park; Attendance: 14,322; Referee: Robert Lewis

20 November 2021 17	Cheltenham Town	2–1	Shrewsbury Town	Cheltenham
15:00 GMT	Thomas 24' (pen.); Joseph 66'	Report	Pennington (yellow card) 1'; Udoh 4'; Bennett (red card) 23'; Bowman (yellow card) 54'; Leahy (yellow card) 78'	Stadium: Jonny-Rocks Stadium; Attendance: 3,914; Referee: Ollie Yates

23 November 2021 18	Gillingham	0–2	Cheltenham Town	Gillingham
19:45 GMT	Ehmer (yellow card) 53'	Report	Long 30'; May 60'; Flinders (yellow card) 69'	Stadium: Priestfield; Attendance: 3,115; Referee: James Linington

27 November 2021 19	Bolton Wanderers	2–2	Cheltenham Town	Horwich
15:00 GMT	Amaechi 26'; Thomason (yellow card) 30'; Kachunga 58'	Report	May 14', 45+4'; Crowley (yellow card) 45+3'	Stadium: University of Bolton Stadium; Attendance: 13,145; Referee: Ross Joyce

7 December 2021 20	Cheltenham Town	0–5	Cambridge United	Cheltenham
19:45 GMT	Freestone (yellow card) 28'; Wright (yellow card) 31'	Report	Smith 37', (yellow card) 43'; Pollock 52' (o.g.); Ironside 63', 73', 88'	Stadium: Jonny-Rocks Stadium; Attendance: 2,762; Referee: Christopher Pollard

11 December 2021 21	Cheltenham Town	2–2	Lincoln City	Cheltenham
15:00 GMT	May 17', (yellow card) 71'; Long (yellow card) 59'; Raglan (yellow card) 69'; Williams (yellow card) 90+3'; Blair 90+5'; Pollock (yellow card) 90+6'	Report	Bridcutt (yellow card) 65'; Bishop 69', 90+1'; McGrandles (yellow card) 75'	Stadium: Jonny-Rocks Stadium; Attendance: 3,512; Referee: Tom Nield

18 December 2021 22	Shrewsbury Town	3–1	Cheltenham Town	Shrewsbury
15:00 GMT	Udoh 10', 48'; Bloxham (red card) 40'; Davis 78'	Report	Williams 16'; May (yellow card) 25'; Hussey (yellow card) 40'; Chapman (yellow card) 45'	Stadium: Montgomery Waters Meadow; Attendance: 5,741; Referee: Andrew Kitchen

26 December 2021 23	Cheltenham Town	0–2	Plymouth Argyle	Cheltenham
15:00 GMT	Crowley (yellow card) 82'	Report	Camará 42'; Garrick 75'	Stadium: Jonny-Rocks Stadium; Attendance: 5,703; Referee: Tom Reeves

1 January 2022 24	Oxford United	1–1	Cheltenham Town	Littlemore
15:00 GMT	Taylor (penalty missed) 29'; Sykes (yellow card) 32', (goal) 82'	Report	Thomas (yellow card) 45'; Wright 48'; Blair (yellow card) 58'; Freestone (yellow card) 71'; Evans (yellow card) 72'; Raglan (yellow card) 77'	Stadium: The Kassam Stadium; Attendance: 8,351; Referee: Carl Brook

8 January 2022 25	Cheltenham Town	1–1	Burton Albion	Cheltenham
15:00 GMT	Blair (yellow card) 16'; Wright 21'	Report	Jebbison 51'; Oshilaja (yellow card) 64'; Hamer (yellow card) 78'	Stadium: Jonny-Rocks Stadium; Referee: David Rock

15 January 2022 26	Cheltenham Town	1–1	Charlton Athletic	Cheltenham
15:00 GMT	Nlundulu 43', (yellow card) 68'; Wright (yellow card) 62'; Thomas (yellow card) 67'	Report	Aneke (yellow card) 45', (goal) 90+4'; Inniss (yellow card) 68'	Stadium: Jonny-Rocks Stadium; Attendance: 4,709; Referee: Seb Stockbridge

22 January 2022 27	Rotherham United	1–0	Cheltenham Town	Rotherham
15:00 GMT	Smith 24'	Report	Boyle (yellow card) 31'; Nlundulu (yellow card) 38'; Sercombe (yellow card) 86'; Thomas (yellow card) 90+9'	Stadium: AESSEAL New York Stadium; Attendance: 9,187; Referee: Oliver Langford

29 January 2022 28	Cheltenham Town	0–0	Wigan Athletic	Cheltenham
15:00 GMT	Williams (yellow card) 38' (yellow-red card) 90+2'	Report	Shinnie (yellow card) 45+2'; McClean (yellow card) 89'	Stadium: Jonny-Rocks Stadium; Attendance: 4,405; Referee: Paul Howard

1 February 2022 29	AFC Wimbledon	2–2	Cheltenham Town	Wimbledon
19:45 GMT	Assal 8'; Brown (yellow card) 45+2'; Marsh (yellow card) 61'; Cosgrave 80', (yellow card) 90+6'	Report	Sercombe (yellow card) 16'; Raglan (yellow card) 26'; May 31', 34' (pen.); Hutchinson (yellow card) 66'	Stadium: Plough Lane; Attendance: 6,138; Referee: Sam Purkiss

8 February 2022 30	Cheltenham Town	2–1	Sunderland	Cheltenham
19:45 GMT	Boyle (yellow card) 38'; Bonds 64'; May 78'	Report	Pritchard 32'; Batth (yellow card) 50'; Roberts (yellow card) 88'; Matete (yellow card) 90'	Stadium: Jonny-Rocks Stadium; Attendance: 5,744; Referee: Darren Drysdale

12 February 2022 31	Cheltenham Town	2–0	Fleetwood Town	Cheltenham
15:00 GMT	May 41'; Raglan 45'; Williams (yellow card) 57'	Report	Nsiala (yellow card) 48'; Hayes (yellow card) 87'	Stadium: Jonny-Rocks Stadium; Attendance: 3,517; Referee: Bobby Madley

19 February 2022 32	Wycombe Wanderers	5–5	Cheltenham Town	High Wycombe
15:00 GMT	Obita 26', 31'; Hanlan 33'; Vokes 68', 69'; Jacobson (yellow card) 73'; Grimmer (yellow card) 89'; Wheeler (yellow card) 90+6'	Report	May 3', 52', 71', 81'; Etete (yellow card) 22', (goal) 66'	Stadium: Adams Park; Attendance: 5,574; Referee: Neil Hair

22 February 2022 33	Ipswich Town	0–0	Cheltenham Town	Ipswich
19:45 GMT	Woolfenden (yellow card) 90+4'	Report	Colkett (yellow card) 64'; Freestone (yellow card) 73'; Williams (yellow card) 84'; Raglan (yellow card) 90+4'	Stadium: Portman Road; Attendance: 21,318; Referee: Andy Davies

26 February 2022 34	Cheltenham Town	1–2	Crewe Alexandra	Cheltenham
15:00 GMT	Boyle (yellow card) 31'; Etete 48'; Wright (yellow card) 61'	Report	Long 18'; Griffiths (yellow card) 26'; Johnson (yellow card) 64'; Porter 83'	Stadium: The Jonny Rocks Stadium; Attendance: 4,227; Referee: Anthony Backhouse

5 March 2022 35	Cheltenham Town	4–0	Doncaster Rovers	Cheltenham
15:00 GMT	May 16', 75'; Boyle (yellow card) 31'; Raglan (yellow card) 33'; Williams 38'; Bonds (yellow card) 69'; Pollock 84'	Report	Olowu (yellow card) 12'; Clayton (yellow card) 34' (yellow-red card) 48'	Stadium: The Jonny Rocks Stadium; Attendance: 4,212; Referee: Peter Wright

8 March 2022 36	Milton Keynes Dons	3–1	Cheltenham Town	Denbigh
19:45 GMT	Parrott 26', 85'; Eisa 28'	Report	May (yellow card) 72'; Boyle 89'	Stadium: Stadium MK; Attendance: 6,894; Referee: Craig Hicks

12 March 2022 37	Morecambe	1–3	Cheltenham Town	Morecambe
15:00 GMT	Leigh 52'	Report	Bonds (yellow card) 9'; Sercombe 44'; Wright 46'; May 80'	Stadium: The Mazuma Stadium; Attendance: 3,733; Referee: Andrew Kitchen

19 March 2022 38	Cheltenham Town	3–1	AFC Wimbledon	Cheltenham
15:00 GMT	Raglan (yellow card) 17'; Williams (yellow card) 63'; Wright 81'; Lloyd 83'; May 90+2'	Report	Rudoni 26'; Hartigan (yellow card) 86'	Stadium: The Jonny Rocks Stadium; Attendance: 3,836; Referee: Scott Oldham

22 March 2022 39	Plymouth Argyle	2–0	Cheltenham Town	Plymouth
19:45 GMT	Ennis 14'; Mayor 42'	Report	Colkett (yellow card) 90'	Stadium: Home Park; Referee: Christopher Pollard

26 March 2022 40	Sheffield Wednesday	4–1	Cheltenham Town	Owlerton
15:00 GMT	Luongo 7'; Gregory 58', (yellow card) 82'; Hunt 83'; Byers 87'	Report	May 4'; Boyle (yellow card) 34'; Wright (yellow card) 57'; Raglan (yellow card) 64'	Stadium: Hillsborough Stadium; Attendance: 21,925; Referee: Tim Robinson

2 April 2022 41	Accrington Stanley	4–4	Cheltenham Town	Accrington
15:00 BST	Leigh 45+1', 48'; McConville 45+5'; Sykes (yellow card) 75' (yellow-red card) 90+1'; Coyle (yellow card) 79'; Chapman 87' (o.g.)	Report	May 33'; Boyle 66', 90+6', (yellow card) 90+7'; Wright 90'	Stadium: The Wham Stadium; Attendance: 2,181; Referee: Robert Lewis

9 April 2022 42	Cheltenham Town	1–0	Portsmouth	Cheltenham
15:00 BST	Sercombe 76'; Lloyd (yellow card) 82'	Report		Stadium: The Jonny Rocks Stadium; Attendance: 5,117; Referee: Ollie Yates

15 April 2022 43	Cheltenham Town	2–2	Gillingham	Cheltenham
15:00 BST	Wright 40'; Hutchinson (yellow card) 57'; Etete 78'; Long (yellow card) 85'	Report	Oliver 14', (yellow card) 88'; Reeves 59'	Stadium: The Jonny Rocks Stadium; Attendance: 4,415; Referee: David Rock

18 April 2022 44	Lincoln City	3–0	Cheltenham Town	Lincoln
15:00 BST	Whittaker 4', 19'; Scully 17'	Report	Ramsey (yellow card) 8'; Freestone (yellow card) 57'; May (yellow card) 81'	Stadium: LNER Stadium; Attendance: 8,672; Referee: Simon Mather

23 April 2022 45	Cheltenham Town	1–2	Bolton Wanderers	Cheltenham
15:00 BST	Lloyd (yellow card) 52'; Bonds (yellow card) 72'; Ramsey 89'	Report	Sadlier 57'; Bakayoko 76' (pen.)	Stadium: The Jonny Rocks Stadium; Attendance: 5,228; Referee: Neil Hair

30 April 2022 46	Cambridge United	2–2	Cheltenham Town	Cambridge
12:30 BST	Smith 22', 50'; Simper (yellow card) 40'; O'Neil (yellow card) 45+1'	Report	May 23', (yellow card) 72', (goal) 90+1'; Long (yellow card) 45+1'; Boyle (yellow card) 53' (yellow-red card) 82'; Raglan (yellow card) 64'	Stadium: Abbey Stadium; Attendance: 5,880; Referee: Tom Reeves

=== FA Cup ===
Cheltenham were drawn away to Gillingham in the first round and AFC Wimbledon in the second round.

6 November 2021 First round	Gillingham	1–1	Cheltenham Town	Gillingham
14:00 GMT	Jackson (yellow card) 36'; Sithole 59'; Tucker (yellow card) 90'	Report	Pollock 34'; Chapman (yellow card) 54'; Long (yellow card) 84'	Stadium: Priestfield; Referee: Ollie Yates

16 November 2021 First round replay	Cheltenham Town	1–0	Gillingham	Cheltenham
19:45 GMT	Pollock 11'; Joseph (yellow card) 87'	Report	Tucker (yellow card) 54'; O'Keefe (yellow card) 80'; Ehmer (yellow card) 81'	Stadium: Jonny-Rocks Stadium; Attendance: 2,651; Referee: Lee Swabey

4 December 2021 Second round	AFC Wimbledon	4–3	Cheltenham Town	Wimbledon
15:00 GMT	Assal 36', 55'; Palmer 41', 65'; McCormick (yellow card) 80'; Woodyard (yellow card) 87'	Report	May 2'; Williams 73'; Hussey (yellow card) 80'; Heneghan 81' (o.g.); Norton (yellow card) 89'; Horton (yellow card) 90+6'	Stadium: Plough Lane; Attendance: 4,322; Referee: Alan Young

=== EFL Cup ===
Cheltenham Town were drawn away to Bristol Rovers in the first round, Gillingham in the second round and Preston North End in the third round.

10 August 2021 First round	Bristol Rovers	0–2	Cheltenham Town	Horfield
19:45 BST	Baldwin (yellow card) 88'	Report	May 58'; Vassell 71'	Stadium: Memorial Stadium; Referee: Lee Swabey

24 August 2021 Second round	Gillingham	1–1 (4–5 p)	Cheltenham Town	Gillingham
19:45 BST	Oliver 20'	Report	May 24'	Stadium: Priestfield Stadium; Referee: David Rock
	Penalties
	Lee (penalty scored); O'Keefe (penalty missed); Lloyd (penalty scored); Carayol (penalty scored); Adshead (penalty scored)		Thomas (penalty scored); Wright (penalty scored); Lloyd (penalty scored); Tozer (penalty scored); Chapman (penalty scored)

21 September 2021 Third round	Preston North End	4–1	Cheltenham Town	Preston
19:45 BST	Hughes 25'; Rafferty 37'; Maguire 82'; Rudd (yellow card) 85'; Riis 90+3'	Report	Barkers (yellow card) 28'; Thomas (yellow card) 32'; Vassell 56', (yellow card) 90+2'	Stadium: Deepdale; Attendance: 6,561; Referee: Dean Whitestone

=== EFL Trophy ===
Cheltenham were drawn into Group E in the Southern section, alongside Bristol Rovers, Chelsea U21s and Exeter City.

Pos	Div	Team	Pld	W	PW	PL	L	GF	GA	GD	Pts	Qualification
1	L2	Exeter City	3	1	1	1	0	8	6	+2	6	Advance to Round 2
2	ACA	Chelsea U21	3	1	1	1	0	3	2	+1	6	Advance to Round 2
3	L2	Bristol Rovers	3	1	0	0	2	6	7	−1	3	
4	L1	Cheltenham Town	3	0	1	1	1	2	4	−2	3	

Source: EFL.com

31 August 2021 Group game 1	Bristol Rovers	2–0	Cheltenham Town	Horfield
19:00 BST	Nicholson 61'; Saunders 70'	Report		Stadium: Memorial Stadium; Attendance: 889; Referee: Will Finnie

5 October 2021 Group game 2	Cheltenham Town	2–2 (2–3 p)	Exeter City	Cheltenham
19:00 BST	Chapman 37'; Miles 70'	Report	Daniel 8'; Collins 38'	Stadium: Jonny-Rocks Stadium; Attendance: 987; Referee: Craig Hicks
	Penalties
	Norton (penalty scored); Hussey (penalty scored); Freestone (penalty missed); Bonds (penalty missed); Vassell (penalty missed)		Amond (penalty missed); Sweeney (penalty scored); Cox (penalty missed); Caprice (penalty scored); Kite (penalty scored)

26 October 2021 Group game 3	Cheltenham Town	0–0 (5–4 p)	Chelsea U21	Cheltenham
19:00 BST	Freestone (yellow card) 19'; Barkers (yellow card) 61'; May (yellow card) 89'	Report	Simons (yellow card) 71'; McEachran (yellow card) 74'	Stadium: Jonny-Rocks Stadium; Referee: Alan Young
	Penalties
	Chapman (penalty scored); Miles (penalty scored); May (penalty scored); Guinan (penalty scored); Norton (penalty scored)		Nunn (penalty scored); Wareham (penalty scored); Baker (penalty missed); Mbuyamba (penalty scored); Haigh (penalty scored)

== Transfers ==
=== Transfers in ===
Date	Position	Nationality	Name	From	Fee	Ref.
1 July 2021	CM	(Guyana)	Elliot Bonds	(England) Hull City	Free transfer	
1 July 2021	GK	(Wales)	Owen Evans	(England) Wigan Athletic	Free transfer	
29 July 2021	DM	(England)	Dylan Barkers	(England) Alvechurch	Undisclosed	
9 August 2021	CF	(Northern Ireland)	Kyle Vassell	(England) Rotherham United	Free transfer	
2 October 2021	AM	(England)	Daniel Crowley	(England) Birmingham City	Free transfer	
5 January 2022	LB	(Wales)	Ben Williams	(England) Barnsley	Undisclosed	
6 January 2022	CF	(England)	Charlie Brown	(England) Milton Keynes Dons	Undisclosed	
11 January 2022	LB	(England)	Reece Hutchinson	(England) Burton Albion	Free transfer	
18 January 2022	CM	(England)	Charlie Colkett	(Sweden) Östersunds	Free transfer	

=== Loans in ===
Date from	Position	Nationality	Name	From	Date until	Ref.
5 August 2021	CM	(England)	Taylor Perry	(England) Wolverhampton Wanderers	End of season	
5 August 2021	CM	(England)	Callum Wright	(England) Leicester City	End of season	
30 August 2021	CB	(England)	Mattie Pollock	(England) Watford	End of season	
31 August 2021	CF	(Scotland)	Kyle Joseph	(Wales) Swansea City	5 January 2022	(Note: On 5 January 2022, Kyle Joseph was recalled to parent club Swansea City.)
31 August 2021	CF	(Wales)	Christian Norton	(England) Stoke City	31 December 2021	
6 January 2022	CF	(England)	Dan Nlundulu	(England) Southampton	End of season	
11 January 2022	CM	(England)	Aaron Ramsey	(England) Aston Villa	End of season	
17 January 2022	CF	(England)	Kion Etete	(England) Tottenham Hotspur	End of season	
31 January 2022	CF	(England)	Jamie Soule	(England) West Bromwich Albion	End of season	

=== Loans out ===
Date from	Position	Nationality	Name	To	Date until	Ref.
13 August 2021	DM	(England)	Dylan Barkers	(England) Alvechurch	20 September 2021	
13 August 2021	DF	(England)	George Clark	(England) Gresley Rovers	Work experience	
13 August 2021	GK	(England)	Max Harris	(England) Bishop's Cleeve	20 August 2021	
20 August 2021	DF	(England)	Will Armitage	(England) Evesham United		
20 August 2021	SS	(England)	Callum Ebanks	(England) Evesham United		
20 August 2021	FW	(England)	Zac Guinan	(England) Bishop's Cleeve	Work experience	
20 August 2021	GK	(England)	Max Harris	(England) Cinderford Town	September 2021	
20 August 2021	RB	(England)	Joe Hunt	(England) Evesham United		
20 August 2021	MF	(England)	Felix Miles	(England) Evesham United		
30 August 2021	CF	(England)	George Lloyd	(England) Port Vale	13 January 2022 (Note: On 13 January, Lloyd was recalled early from his loan spell at Port Vale.)	
13 September 2021	GK	(England)	Max Harris	(England) Redditch United		
15 October 2021	FW	(England)	Zac Guinan	(England) Bromsgrove Sporting		
15 October 2021	LB	(England)	Connor Jakeways	(England) Fairford Town		
15 October 2021	LB	(England)	Harvey Skurek	(England) Fairford Town		
20 October 2021	CM	(Guyana)	Elliot Bonds	(England) Kidderminster Harriers	4 December 2021	
13 December 2021	SS	(England)	Callum Ebanks	(England) Bromsgrove Sporting	End of season	
28 December 2021	LB	(England)	Connor Jakeways	(England) Evesham United		
28 December 2021	DF	(England)	Will Taylor	(England) Bishop's Cleeve		
14 January 2022	DM	(England)	Dylan Barkers	(England) Leamington	February 2022	
21 January 2022	MF	(England)	Charlie Dashfield	(England) Cribbs		
21 January 2022	MF	(England)	Brennan Denness-Barrett	(England) Bishop's Cleeve		
21 January 2022	CB	(England)	Grant Horton	(Republic of Ireland) Bohemian	End of season	
11 February 2022	DM	(England)	Dylan Barkers	(England) Gloucester City	March 2022	

=== Transfers out ===
Date	Position	Nationality	Name	To	Fee	Ref.
30 June 2021	CF	(England)	Alex Addai	(England) Torquay United	Released	
30 June 2021	CB	(Antigua and Barbuda)	Daniel Bowry	(England) King's Lynn Town	Released	
30 June 2021	CF	(England)	Tahvon Campbell	(England) Woking	Released	
30 June 2021	CM	(England)	Tom Chamberlain	(England) Evesham United	Released	
30 June 2021	CM	(England)	Chris Clements	(England) Nuneaton Borough	Released	
27 August 2021	CB	(England)	Ben Tozer	(Wales) Wrexham	£200'000	
1 January 2022	AM	(England)	Daniel Crowley	(Netherlands) Willem II	End of contract	
6 January 2022	CF	(Northern Ireland)	Kyle Vassell	(United States) San Diego Loyal	Mutual consent	
10 January 2022	LB	(England)	Chris Hussey	(England) Port Vale	Undisclosed	
2 February 2022	CB	(England)	Will Armitage	(England) Southampton	Undisclosed	
