= Saxon Earley =

English footballer (born 2002)

Personal information
- Full name: Saxon Owen Earley
- Date of birth: 11 October 2002 (age 24)
- Height: 5 ft 10 in (1.77 m)
- Positions: Left-back; midfielder

Team information
- Current team: Stevenage
- Number: 14

Youth career
- 2010–2022: Norwich City

Senior career*
Years	Team	Apps	(Gls)
2022–2023	Norwich City	0	(0)
2022	→ Stevenage (loan)	21	(0)
2023–2025	Plymouth Argyle	10	(2)
2024	→ Wycombe Wanderers (loan)	0	(0)
2024–2025	→ Lincoln City (loan)	0	(0)
2025–	Stevenage	30	(0)
- * Club domestic league appearances and goals as of 12:25, 22 November 2026 (UTC)

Saxon Owen Earley (born 11 October 2002) is an English professional footballer who plays as a left-back and midfielder for EFL League One club Stevenage.

== Career ==
Earley joined Norwich City at under-9 level, and turned professional in 2021, before signing a one-year extension in February 2022. He moved on loan to Stevenage in July 2022. He signed for Plymouth Argyle in January 2023 for an undisclosed fee.

He moved on loan to Wycombe Wanderers on 1 February 2024.

On 30 August 2024, he joined League One side, Lincoln City on a season-long loan. Earley made his debut against Chesterfield in the EFL Trophy coming off the bench in a 1–0 defeat. On 14 January 2025, he was recalled from his loan having played just three games for Lincoln.

On 9 June 2025, Earley returned to Stevenage on a free transfer.

== Career statistics ==
As of match played 21 November 2026

Appearances and goals by club, season and competition
Club	Season	League			FA Cup		EFL Cup		Other		Total	
Club	Season	Division	Apps	Goals	Apps	Goals	Apps	Goals	Apps	Goals	Apps	Goals
Norwich City	2022–23	Championship	0	0	—		—		—		0	0
Stevenage (loan)	2022–23	League Two	21	0	1	0	3	1	2 (Note: Appearances in the EFL Trophy)	0	27	1
Plymouth Argyle	2022–23	League One	9	2	—		—		—		9	2
Plymouth Argyle	2023–24	Championship	1	0	0	0	1	0	—		2	0
Plymouth Argyle	2024–25	Championship	0	0	0	0	0	0	—		0	0
Plymouth Argyle	Total		10	2	0	0	1	0	0	0	11	2
Wycombe Wanderers (loan)	2023–24	League One	0	0	0	0	0	0	0	0	0	0
Lincoln City (loan)	2024–25	League One	0	0	1	0	0	0	2	0	3	0
Stevenage	2025–26	League One	19	0	0	0	0	0	4 (Note: Two appearances in the EFL Trophy, two appearances in the play-offs)	0	23	0
Stevenage	2026–27	League One	11	0	1	0	1	0	3	0	16	0
Stevenage	Total		30	0	1	0	1	0	7	0	39	0
Career total			61	2	3	0	5	1	11	0	80	3

== Honours ==
Plymouth Argyle

- EFL League One: 2022–23
