= 2025–26 Stevenage F.C. season =

50th season in existence of Stevenage FC

Stevenage
2025–26 season
- Chairman: Phil Wallace
- Manager: Alex Revell
- Stadium: Broadhall Way
- League One: 6th
- FA Cup: First round
- EFL Cup: First round
- EFL Trophy: Round of 32
- Play-offs: Semi-finals
- Top goalscorer: League: Jamie Reid (14); All: Jamie Reid (14)
- Highest home attendance: 7,321 v Stockport County (9 May 2026, Play-off semi-final)
- Lowest home attendance: 617 v Crystal Palace U21 (21 Oct 2025, EFL Trophy)
- Average home league attendance: 4,366
- Biggest win: 1–5 v AFC Wimbledon (Away, 2 Sept 2025, EFL Trophy)
- Biggest defeat: 5–1 v Bolton Wanderers (Away, 14 Apr 2026, League One)
Home colours	Away colours	Third colours

The 2025–26 season was the 50th season in the history of Stevenage Football Club and their third consecutive season in League One. In addition to the domestic league, the club also participated in the FA Cup, the EFL Cup, and the EFL Trophy.

== Transfers and contracts ==
=== In ===
Date	Pos.	Player	From	Fee	Ref.
10 June 2025	CAM	(Wales) Chem Campbell	(England) Wolverhampton Wanderers	Undisclosed	
20 June 2025	LW	(Scotland) Phoenix Patterson	(England) Fleetwood Town	£200,000	
1 July 2025 (Note: The transfer was announced on 9 June, and would become official on July 1 once his contract at Plymouth had expired)	LB	(England) Saxon Earley	(England) Plymouth Argyle	Free	
1 July 2025 (Note: The transfer was announced on 6 June, and would become official on July 1 once his contract at Plymouth had expired)	CDM	(England) Jordan Houghton	(England) Plymouth Argyle	Free	
11 July 2025	LW	(Democratic Republic of the Congo) Beryly Lubala	(England) Wycombe Wanderers	Free	
11 July 2025	RB	(England) Jasper Pattenden	(England) Wycombe Wanderers	Free transfer	
23 July 2025	CAM	(Wales) Mathaeus Roberts	(England) Ipswich Town	Free	
29 July 2025	GK	(England) Filip Marschall	(England) Aston Villa	Undisclosed	
11 August 2025	CF	(England) Jovan Malcolm	(England) Gateshead	Undisclosed	
28 January 2026	CB	(England) Jack Taylor	(England) Sutton United	Undisclosed	
31 January 2026	CM	(England) Joe Knight	(England) Brighton & Hove Albion	Undisclosed	
13 February 2026	RW	(Scotland) Matt Phillips	(England) Oxford United	Free	

Expenditure: ▼£200,000 (excluding undisclosed transfers)

=== Out ===
Date	Pos.	Player	To	Fee	Ref.
17 June 2025	GK	(England) Rylee Mitchell	(England) Norwich City	Undisclosed	
26 June 2025	CF	(Scotland) Aaron Pressley	(England) Walsall	Undisclosed	
29 July 2025	CF	(Scotland) Louis Appéré	(England) Cambridge United	Undisclosed	
13 January 2026	MF	(England) Nick Freeman	(England) Shrewsbury Town	Undisclosed	
16 January 2026	CF	(England) Jake Young	(Scotland) St Mirren	Undisclosed	
2 February 2026	CM	(England) Ryan Doherty	(England) Ipswich Town	Undisclosed	

=== Loaned in ===
Date	Pos.	Player	From	Date until	Ref.
14 August 2025	CF	(Morocco) Gassan Ahadme	(England) Charlton Athletic	31 May 2026	
1 September 2025	CM	(England) Lewis Orford	(England) West Ham United	27 November 2025 (Note: On 27 November, Orford was recalled to West Ham United from his initial season-long loan)	
17 January 2026	CF	(England) Harry Cornick	(England) Bristol City	31 May 2026	

=== Loaned out ===
Date	Pos.	Player	To	Date until	Ref.
4 October 2025	CAM	(Wales) Mathaeus Roberts	(England) Bedford Town	1 November 2025	
2 January 2026	CAM	(Wales) Mathaeus Roberts	(England) Eastbourne Borough	6 April 2026	
29 January 2026	CF	(England) Jovan Malcolm	(England) Barrow	31 May 2026	
13 February 2026	CF	(England) Samuel Ayolie	(England) Canvey Island	14 March 2026	
13 February 2026	CM	Riley England	(England) Royston Town	14 March 2026	
13 February 2026	CF	(England) Frank Norris	(England) Bishop's Stortford	14 March 2026	
13 February 2026	LB	(England) Dylan Suleiman	(England) Wormley Rovers	14 March 2026	
19 February 2026	CB	(England) Alfie Thornett	(England) Uxbridge	19 March 2026	
4 March 2026	GK	(England) Calum Barnes	(England) Baldock Town	1 April 2026	

=== Released / Out of Contract ===
Date	Pos.	Player	Subsequent club	Join date	Ref.
30 June 2025	RW	(England) Elliott List	(England) Northampton Town	1 July 2025	
30 June 2025	CF	(England) Makise Evans	(England) Colchester United	11 July 2025	
30 June 2025	RB	(England) Kane Smith	(England) Barnet	15 July 2025	
30 June 2025	CM	(England) David Hicks	(England) Reading	4 August 2025	
30 June 2025	CM	(England) Jake Forster-Caskey	(England) Woking	26 August 2025	
30 June 2025	LW	(England) Kyle Edwards	(England) Northampton Town	1 September 2025	

=== New Contract ===
Date	Pos.	Player	Expiry	Ref.
14 August 2025	LM	(England) Jordan Roberts	Undisclosed	
15 August 2025	CB	(England) Carl Piergianni	Undisclosed	
27 August 2025	CM	(England) Ryan Doherty	Undisclosed (Note: First professional contract)	
20 October 2025	CAM	(England) Dan Kemp	30 June 2028	
12 January 2026	GK	(England) Max Woodford	Undisclosed	
16 January 2026	CB	(England) Lewis Freestone	Undisclosed	
26 February 2026	CF	(England) Lenny Brown	Undisclosed	
4 April 2026	CF	(England) Frank Norris	Undisclosed	

== Pre-season and friendlies ==
On 14 May, Stevenage announced a pre-season camp in Murcia along with a friendly against Swansea City. A second fixture was later confirmed, against Milton Keynes Dons. A behind-closed-doors meeting with Queens Park Rangers was also later added. In July, a trip to face Bishop's Stortford was added to the schedule.

Win Draw Loss Fixtures

5 July 2025 Friendly	Queens Park Rangers	5–0	Stevenage	Hounslow
12:00 BST	Dembélé 15', 35'; Chair 30'; Richards 32'; Vale 77'	Report		Stadium: TSG Training Centre; Attendance: 0 (behind-closed-doors)

12 July 2025 Friendly	Bishop's Stortford	1–8	Stevenage	Bishop's Stortford
14:00 BST	Trialist 69'	Report	Doherty 29'; Roberts 52', 80'; Patterson 68', 90'; Trialist 63', 68', 86'	Stadium: Woodside Park

19 July 2025 Friendly	Swansea City	3–2	Stevenage	San Pedro del Pinatar, Spain
12:00 CEST	Trialist 5' (o.g.); Wales 38'; Vipotnik 66'	Report	Sweeney 47'; Trialist 57'	Stadium: Pinatar Arena

26 July 2025 Friendly	Stevenage	2–1	Milton Keynes Dons	Stevenage
15:00 BST	Kemp 44'; Reid 77'	Report	Hendry 84'	Stadium: Broadhall Way

== Competitions ==
=== League One ===
==== League table ====
Pos	Team	Pld	W	D	L	GF	GA	GD	Pts	Promotion, qualification or relegation
4	Bradford City	46	22	11	13	58	51	+7	77	Qualification for League One play-offs
5	Bolton Wanderers (O, P)	46	19	18	9	70	52	+18	75	Qualification for League One play-offs
6	Stevenage	46	21	12	13	49	46	+3	75	Qualification for League One play-offs
7	Luton Town	46	21	11	14	68	56	+12	74	
8	Plymouth Argyle	46	22	7	17	75	63	+12	73	

Source: EFL Official Website
Rules for classification: 1) Points; 2) Goal difference; 3) Number of goals scored; 4) Head-to-head results; 5) Wins; 6) Away goals; 7) Penalty points (sec 9.5); 8) 12-point sending off offences
(O) Play-off winners; (P) Promoted

==== Results summary ====
Overall								Home						Away					
Pld	W	D	L	GF	GA	GD	Pts	W	D	L	GF	GA	GD	W	D	L	GF	GA	GD
46	21	12	13	49	46	+3	75	14	7	2	27	13	+14	7	5	11	22	33	−11

Last updated: complete.
Source: Soccerway

==== Results by round ====
Round	1	2	3	4	5	6	8	9	10	11	13	14	15	17	12^{1}	18	19	20	21	22	23	24	26	27	16^{2}	28	29	30	31	32	33	34	35	36	25^{3}	37	38	39	41	42	43	40^{4}	44	7^{5}	45	46
Ground	A	H	H	A	A	H	A	H	A	H	A	H	A	H	A	A	H	A	H	A	A	H	A	A	H	H	H	A	A	H	H	A	H	A	H	H	A	H	A	H	A	A	H	H	A	H
Result	W	W	W	W	L	W	D	W	W	W	L	D	L	D	W	D	L	W	D	D	L	D	L	L	D	D	W	L	L	W	W	L	W	W	L	W	L	W	D	W	W	L	D	W	D	W
Position	5	5	1	1	3	2	4	2	2	1	2	2	4	6	1	2	6	5	4	5	7	7	8	8	8	8	7	8	9	9	7	8	8	8	8	5	8	6	7	6	6	6	6	6	6	6
Points	3	6	9	12	12	15	16	19	22	25	25	26	26	27	30	31	31	34	35	36	36	37	37	37	38	39	42	42	42	45	48	48	51	54	54	57	57	60	61	64	67	67	68	71	72	75

Source: EFL
A = Away; H = Home; W = Win; D = Draw; L = Loss; P = Postponed
Notes:
- ^{1} Matchday 12 (vs Peterborough United) was postponed due to international call-ups.
- ^{2} Matchday 16 (vs Bolton Wanderers) was postponed due to international call-ups.
- ^{3} Matchday 25 (vs Leyton Orient) was postponed due to a frozen pitch.
- ^{4} Matchday 40 (vs Bolton Wanderers) was postponed due to international call-ups.
- ^{5} Matchday 7 (vs Barnsley) was postponed due to a waterlogged pitch.

==== Matches ====
The league fixtures were released on 26 June 2025.

Win Draw Loss Fixtures

2 August 2025 1	Blackpool	2–3	Stevenage	Blackpool
15:00 BST	Honeyman 6'; Finnigan (yellow card) 73'; Ennis 79'	Report	Kemp (yellow card) 11', (goal) 50'; Reid 17', 45+10' (pen.); Roberts (yellow card) 35'; Goode (yellow card) 66'; Piergianni (yellow card) 68'	Stadium: Bloomfield Road; Attendance: 10,090 (341 away); Referee: Matt Corlett

9 August 2025 2	Stevenage	1–0	Rotherham United	Stevenage
15:00 BST	Kemp (yellow card) 8'; Reid 40'; Goode (yellow card) 68'; Phillips (yellow card) 87'	Report	Rafferty (yellow card) 35'; Raggett (yellow card) 48'	Stadium: Broadhall Way; Attendance: 3,470 (658 away); Referee: James Durkin

16 August 2025 3	Stevenage	2–0	Northampton Town	Stevenage
15:00 BST	Piergianni (yellow card) 20'; Butler (yellow card) 33'; Kemp 67'; Ahadme 82'	Report		Stadium: Broadhall Way; Attendance: 3,350 (725 away); Referee: Tom Reeves

19 August 2025 4	Port Vale	1–2	Stevenage	Stoke-on-Trent
19:45 BST	Ojo (yellow card) 20'; Tolaj 36'	Report	Houghton (yellow card) 69'; Reid 88', 90+1'; Goode (yellow card) 90+2'	Stadium: Vale Park; Attendance: 6,653 (132 away); Referee: Seb Stockbridge

23 August 2025 5	Huddersfield Town	1–0	Stevenage	Huddersfield
15:00 BST	May 66'; Kane (yellow card) 74'; Ashia (yellow card) 77'	Report	Phillips (yellow card) 90+3'	Stadium: Kirklees Stadium; Attendance: 16,489; Referee: Darren Drysdale

30 August 2025 6	Stevenage	1–0	Wycombe Wanderers	Stevenage
15:00 BST	Campbell 34'; Houghton (yellow card) 54'; Freestone (yellow card) 84'	Report	Harvie (yellow card) 45'; Quitirna (yellow card) 69'	Stadium: Broadhall Way; Attendance: 3,779 (679 away); Referee: Simon Mather

13 September 2025 8	Mansfield Town	1–1	Stevenage	Mansfield
15:00 BST	Blake-Tracy (yellow card) 31'; Moriah-Welsh (yellow card) 66'; Gardner 73'	Report	Freestone (yellow card) 45+2'; Goode 70'; Lubala (yellow card) 75'; White (yellow card) 79'; Piergianni (yellow card) 90'	Stadium: Field Mill; Attendance: 7,301 (248 away); Referee: Martin Woods

20 September 2025 9	Stevenage	2–1	Exeter City	Stevenage
15:00 BST	White 5'; Roberts 80', (yellow card) 81'	Report	Magennis 27'; Wareham (yellow card) 38'	Stadium: Broadhall Way; Attendance: 4,129 (368 away); Referee: Craig Hicks

27 September 2025 10	Leyton Orient	2–3	Stevenage	Leyton
12:30 BST	Connolly 24'; Ballard 68'	Report	White 26'; Freestone 54'; Piergianni 61'; Goode (yellow card) 90+4'	Stadium: Brisbane Road; Attendance: 7,898; Referee: Andrew Humphries
Note: Fixture was originally scheduled for a 15:00 kick-off, but was moved live Sky Sports broadcasting.

4 October 2025 11	Stevenage	2–0	Luton Town	Stevenage
15:00 BST	White (yellow card) 40'; Sweeney (yellow card) 45+1'; Campbell 65'; Roberts 71'; Marschall (yellow card) 83'	Report	Makosso (yellow card) 35'	Stadium: Broadhall Way; Attendance: 7,228 (1,363 away); Referee: James Bell

18 October 2025 13	Lincoln City	1–0	Stevenage	Lincoln
12:30 BST	Street 69'; House (yellow card) 90'	Report	Roberts (yellow card) 90'	Stadium: Sincil Bank; Attendance: 8,451 (499 away); Referee: Martin Coy
Note: Fixture was originally scheduled for a 15:00 kick-off, but was rescheduled for live Sky Sports broadcasting.

25 October 2025 14	Stevenage	1–1	Bradford City	Stevenage
15:00 BST	Houghton (yellow card) 13'; White 18'; Piergianni (yellow card) 27'; Butler (yellow card) 74'	Report	Byrne 3'; Touray (yellow card) 44'; Kavanagh (yellow card) 47'; Wright (yellow card) 65'	Stadium: Broadhall Way; Attendance: 5,279 (1,361 away); Referee: Sam Allison

6 November 2025 15	Reading	1–0	Stevenage	Reading
20:00 GMT	Savage 4'; Dorsett (yellow card) 10'; Kyerewaa (yellow card) 45+1'; Ritchie (yellow card) 70'	Report	Freestone (yellow card) 29'; Houghton (yellow card) 56'; Phillips (yellow card) 86'; White (yellow card) 88'	Stadium: Madejski Stadium; Attendance: 9,233 (285 away); Referee: Benjamin Speedie
Note: Fixture was originally scheduled for 8 November, but was rescheduled for live Sky Sports broadcasting.

22 November 2025 17	Stevenage	0–0	Doncaster Rovers	Stevenage
15:00 GMT	Piergianni (yellow card) 44'	Report	Middleton (yellow card) 86'; Molyneux (yellow card) 90+1'	Stadium: Broadhall Way; Attendance: 4,015 (531 away); Referee: Elliot Bell

25 November 2025 12	Peterborough United	0–1	Stevenage	Peterborough
19:45 GMT	O'Connor (yellow card) 58'; Morgan (yellow card) 64'; Garbett (yellow card) 72'	Report	Kemp (yellow card) 2'; Reid 21' (pen.); James-Wildin (yellow card) 56'; Freestone (yellow card) 72'	Stadium: London Road Stadium; Attendance: 6,840 (511 away); Referee: Edward Duckworth
Note: Fixture was originally scheduled for 11 October, but was postponed due to international call-ups.

29 November 2025 18	Wigan Athletic	0–0	Stevenage	Wigan
15:00 GMT		Report	Freestone (yellow card) 84'	Stadium: Brick Community Stadium; Attendance: 8,679 (218 away); Referee: Ross Joyce

9 December 2025 19	Stevenage	0–1	Cardiff City	Stevenage
19:45 GMT	Piergianni (yellow card) 40'; Goode (yellow card) 45'; Phillips (yellow card) 75'; Doherty (yellow card) 76'		Chambers (yellow card) 82'; Robinson 85'	Stadium: Broadhall Way; Attendance: 4,428; Referee: James Oldham

13 December 2025 20	Stockport County	1–3	Stevenage	Edgeley
15:00 GMT	Wootton 62'; Hunt (yellow card) 83'	Report	Campbell 22'; Reid 53'; Thompson 64'; Freestone (yellow card) 79'; Phillips (yellow card) 85'	Stadium: Edgeley Park; Attendance: 8,898 (232 away); Referee: Will Finnie

20 December 2025 21	Stevenage	2–2	Burton Albion	Stevenage
12:30 GMT	Reid 46'; Armer 60' (o.g.); Earley (yellow card) 76'	Report	Shade 22'; Beesley 67'; Williams (yellow card) 68'	Stadium: Broadhall Way; Attendance: 3,282 (184 away); Referee: Scott Oldham
Note: Fixture was originally scheduled for a 15:00 kick-off, but was rescheduled for live Sky Sports broadcasting.

26 December 2025 22	AFC Wimbledon	0–0	Stevenage	Wimbledon
15:00 GMT	Reeves (yellow card) 64'		Freestone (yellow card) 67'; Houghton (yellow card) 68'; White (yellow card) 73'	Stadium: Plough Lane; Attendance: 8,465; Referee: David Rock

29 December 2025 23	Cardiff City	2–1	Stevenage	Leckwith
19:45 GMT	Robinson 64'; Salech 82'; Colwill (yellow card) 90+4'	Report	White (yellow card) 54'; Patterson 57'; Thompson (yellow card) 90+3'	Stadium: Cardiff City Stadium; Attendance: 19,678 (427 away); Referee: Charles Breakspear

1 January 2026 24	Stevenage	1–1	Plymouth Argyle	Stevenage
15:00 GMT	James-Wilden 53'; Reid (yellow card) 64'; Campbell (yellow card) 90+3'		Boateng 68'; Sorinola (yellow card) 90+4'	Stadium: Broadhall Way; Attendance: 5,042; Referee: Richard Eley

10 January 2026 26	Luton Town	2–1	Stevenage	Luton
12:30 GMT	Lonwijk (yellow card) 22'; Clark (penalty missed) 29', 55'; Kodua 64'	Report	Freestone 53', (yellow card) 90'; Roberts (yellow card) 69'	Stadium: Kenilworth Road; Attendance: 11,434; Referee: Simon Mather
Note: Fixture was initially scheduled for a 15:00 kick-off, but was rescheduled for live Sky Sports broadcasting.

17 January 2026 27	Exeter City	3–0	Stevenage	Exeter
15:00 GMT	Wareham 49' (pen.); Brierley 73'; Doyle-Hayes (yellow card) 90+2'; Whitworth (yellow card) 90+4'; Tutierov 90+8'	Report	Patterson (yellow card) 88'; Goode (yellow card) 90+3'	Stadium: St James Park; Attendance: 6,302 (187 away); Referee: Martin Woods

20 January 2026 16	Stevenage	0–0	Bolton Wanderers	Stevenage
19:45 GMT		Report	Johnston (yellow card) 83'	Stadium: Broadhall Way; Attendance: 3,156 (792 away); Referee: Stephen Parkinson
Note: Fixture was originally scheduled for 15 November, but was postponed due to international call-ups.

24 January 2026 28	Stevenage	1–1	Mansfield Town	Stevenage
15:00 GMT	Phillips (yellow card) 3'; Roberts (yellow card) 23'; Lubala (yellow card) 49'; Sweeney (yellow card) 90+2'; Campbell 90+6'	Report	Sweeney (yellow card) 51'; Akins 78' (pen.); Hendry (yellow card) 90+1'	Stadium: Broadhall Way; Attendance: 4,041 (967 away); Referee: Ben Atkinson

27 January 2026 29	Stevenage	1–0	Peterborough United	Stevenage
19:45 GMT	Earley (yellow card) 41'; Phillips (yellow card) 57'; Sweeney 79'; Piergianni (yellow card) 86'	Report	Lisbie (yellow card) 39'	Stadium: Broadhall Way; Referee: Andrew Humphries

31 January 2026 30	Barnsley	3–1	Stevenage	Barnsley
15:00 GMT	Watson (yellow card) 7'; McGoldrick 14'; Keillor-Dunn 31', 48'; Shepherd (yellow card) 65'; Goodman (yellow card) 66'	Report	Kemp 37'; Cornick (yellow card) 65'; Lubala (yellow card) 66'	Stadium: Oakwell; Attendance: 9,823 (205 away); Referee: Seb Stockbridge

7 February 2026 31	Northampton Town	3–1	Stevenage	Northampton
15:00 GMT	Forbes 27'; Eaves (penalty missed) 45+3', 45+3'; Dyche (yellow card) 61'; Moore (yellow card) 74'; Fitzsimons (yellow card) 77'; Hoskins (yellow card) 88', (goal) 90'	Report	Reid 37', (yellow card) 45+3'; Goode (yellow card) 45+2'; Sweeney (yellow card) 71'	Stadium: Sixfields Stadium; Attendance: 6,344 (485 away); Referee: Ollie Yates

14 February 2026 32	Stevenage	1–0	Huddersfield Town	Stevenage
12:30 GMT	Sweeney (yellow card) 44'; Phillips (yellow card) 61'; Piergianni 85'; Earley (yellow card) 90+6'	Report	Ledson (yellow card) 22'; Harness (yellow card) 24'; Ashia (yellow card) 90+9'	Stadium: Broadhall Way; Referee: Neil Hair
Note: Fixture was initially scheduled for a 15:00 kick-off, but was rescheduled for live Sky Sports broadcasting.

17 February 2026 33	Stevenage	2–1	Port Vale	Stevenage
19:45 GMT	Thompson (yellow card) 9'; Piergianni (yellow card) 15'; Phillips 19'; Cornick 24'; White (yellow card) 90+4'	Report	Stockley 10', (yellow card) 45'; Gray (yellow card) 45+8'	Stadium: Broadhall Way; Attendance: 2,715 (269 away); Referee: James Durkin

21 February 2026 34	Wycombe Wanderers	3–1	Stevenage	High Wycombe
12:30 GMT	Woodrow 16'; Hagelskjær (yellow card) 47'; Lowe 68'; Quitirna 90+6'	Report	Sweeney (yellow card) 46'; Reid 49'	Stadium: Adams Park; Attendance: 4,727 (inc. 304 away); Referee: Matthew Russell
Note: Fixture was initially scheduled for a 15:00 kick-off, but was rescheduled for live Sky Sports broadcasting.

28 February 2026 35	Stevenage	2–1	Stockport County	Stevenage
15:00 GMT	Piergianni 35'; Thompson (yellow card) 55'; Phillips 57'	Report	Stokes (yellow card) 9'; Sidibeh 29', (yellow card) 74'; Diamond (yellow card) 66'; Hills (yellow card) 83'; Pye (yellow card) 87'	Stadium: Broadhall Way; Attendance: 3,974 (592 away); Referee: Jamie O'Connor

7 March 2026 36	Burton Albion	0–1	Stevenage	Burton upon Trent
15:00 GMT	Beesley (yellow card) 72'	Report	Reid 44'; White (yellow card) 49'; Piergianni (yellow card) 69'; Houghton (yellow card) 90+4'	Stadium: Pirelli Stadium; Attendance: 3,198 (inc. 260 away); Referee: Craig Hicks

10 March 2026 25	Stevenage	1–2	Leyton Orient	Stevenage
19:45 GMT	Reid 22' (pen.); Goode (yellow card) 45+6'	Report	Clare (yellow card) 21'; Ballard 44', 55'; O'Neill (yellow card) 80'; Casey (yellow card) 88'; Archibald (yellow card) 90+2'	Stadium: Broadhall Way; Attendance: 3,559 (875 away); Referee: Charles Breakspear
Note: Fixture was originally scheduled for 4 January, but it was postponed due to a frozen pitch.

14 March 2026 37	Stevenage	1–0	AFC Wimbledon	Stevenage
15:00 GMT	Reid 10' (pen.); Kemp (yellow card) 54'; Freestone (yellow card) 90+3'	Report	Smith (yellow card) 3'; Hippolyte (yellow card) 90+4'	Stadium: Broadhall Way; Attendance: 4,089 (1,102 away); Referee: Declan Bourne

17 March 2026 38	Plymouth Argyle	1–0	Stevenage	Plymouth
19:45 GMT	Mitchell (yellow card) 40'; Ross 57'; Amaechi (yellow card) 90+3'	Report	Freestone (yellow card) 9'	Stadium: Home Park; Attendance: 13,945 (inc. 160 away); Referee: Elliot Bell

21 March 2026 39	Stevenage	1–0	Reading	Stevenage
15:00 GMT	Reid (yellow card) 15'; Kemp 85'; Phillips (yellow card) 90+4'	Report	Dorsett (yellow card) 55'; O'Connor (yellow card) 70'	Stadium: Broadhall Way; Attendance: 4,502 (1,363 away); Referee: Scott Oldham

3 April 2026 41	Rotherham United	0–0	Stevenage	Rotherham
15:00 BST	Gore (yellow card) 51' (yellow-red card) 88'; James (yellow card) 62'	Report	Phillips (yellow card) 13'; Freestone (yellow card) 45+3'; Goode (yellow card) 90+1'; White (yellow card) 90+4'	Stadium: New York Stadium; Attendance: 7,920 (inc. 349 away); Referee: Carl Brook

6 April 2026 42	Stevenage	1–0	Blackpool	Stevenage
15:00 BST	White 66'; Piergianni (yellow card) 86'	Report	Bloxham (yellow card) 87'; Husband (yellow card) 89'	Stadium: Broadhall Way; Attendance: 4,348 (439 away); Referee: David Rock

11 April 2026 43	Bradford City	0–1	Stevenage	Bradford
15:00 BST	Tilt (yellow card) 64'; Touray (yellow card) 90+1'	Report	Kemp 61', (yellow card) 64'; Goode (yellow card) 73'; Sweeney (yellow card) 76'	Stadium: Valley Parade; Attendance: 19,367 (inc. 379 away); Referee: Tom Reeves

14 April 2026 40	Bolton Wanderers	5–1	Stevenage	Horwich
19:45 BST	Cozier-Duberry 13', 49'; Kenny 30'; Rodrigues 67'; Burstow 81'	Report	Phillips (red card); Kemp 64'; Earley (yellow card) 90+2'	Stadium: Toughsheet Community Stadium; Attendance: 19,177 (inc. 135 away); Referee: Thomas Parsons
Note: Fixture was initially scheduled for 28 March, but was postponed due to international call-ups in the Bolton squad.

18 April 2026 44	Stevenage	2–2	Lincoln City	Stevenage
15:00 BST	Thompson 3'; Reid 27'; Phillips (yellow card) 45+2'	Report	Darikwa 17'; Bradley (yellow card) 44'; Varfolomeyev (yellow card) 51'; Street 90+1', (yellow card) 90+5'	Stadium: Broadhall Way; Attendance: 5,647 (1,358 away); Referee: Neil Hair

21 April 2026 7	Stevenage	1–0	Barnsley	Stevenage
19:45 BST	Kemp 22'	Report		Stadium: Broadhall Way; Attendance: 3,620 (inc. 248 away); Referee: Benjamin Speedie
Note: Fixture was originally scheduled for 6 September, but was postponed due to international call-ups within the Barnsley squad. It was then postponed again on 10 February due to a waterlogged pitch.

25 April 2026 45	Doncaster Rovers	1–1	Stevenage	Doncaster
12:30 BST	McGrath (yellow card) 45+3'; Sharp 69'; Senior (yellow card) 72'	Report	Phillips 9'; Earley (yellow card) 60'	Stadium: Eco-Power Stadium; Attendance: 8,770 (651 away); Referee: Martin Coy
Note: Fixture was initially scheduled for a 15:00 kick-off, but was brought forward for live Sky Sports broadcasting.

2 May 2026 46	Stevenage	1–0	Wigan Athletic	Stevenage
15:00 BST	Sweeney 90+2'; Kemp (yellow card) 90+6'	Report	Taylor (yellow card) 45+1'	Stadium: Broadhall Way; Attendance: 6,671 (inc. 710 away); Referee: Matthew Russell

==== Play-offs ====
Stevenage finished 6th in the regular season and were drawn against 3rd place Stockport County.

9 May 2026 Semi-finals first leg	Stevenage	0–1	Stockport County	Stevenage
15:00 BST	Roberts (yellow card) 58'; Piergianni (yellow card) 63'	Report	Sidibeh (yellow card) 53'; Osborn 90+4'	Stadium: Broadhall Way; Attendance: 7,321 (inc. 1,339 away); Referee: Charles Breakspear

13 May 2026 Semi-finals second leg	Stockport County	2–0 (3–0 agg.)	Stevenage	Edgeley
20:00 BST	Barry 14'; Wootton 28'; Norwood (yellow card) 68'	Report	Goode (yellow card) 41'; Kemp (yellow card) 67'	Stadium: Edgeley Park; Referee: Josh Smith

=== FA Cup ===
Stevenage were drawn at home to Chesterfield in the first round.

Win Draw Loss Fixtures

1 November 2025 First round	Stevenage	0–1	Chesterfield	Stevenage
15:00 GMT	Reid (yellow card) 16'; Pattenden (yellow card) 24'; Piergianni (yellow card) 59'; Butler (yellow card) 82'	Report	Dunkley (yellow card) 48'; Bonis 61' (pen.); Daley-Campbell (yellow card) 64'; Fleck (yellow card) 90+4'; Darcy (yellow card) 90+5'	Stadium: Broadhall Way; Attendance: 2,084 (490 away); Referee: Alan Young

=== EFL Cup ===
Win Draw Loss Fixtures

12 August 2025 First round	Charlton Athletic	3–1	Stevenage	Charlton
19:45 BST	Leaburn 27'; Fullah 36'; Berry 77'	Report	Freestone 86'	Stadium: The Valley; Attendance: 4,092; Referee: Craig Hicks

=== EFL Trophy ===
Stevenage were drawn against AFC Wimbledon, Bromley and Crystal Palace U21 in the group stage. After winning the group, Stevenage were drawn at home to Walsall in the round of 32.

Pos	Div	Team	Pld	W	PW	PL	L	GF	GA	GD	Pts	Qualification
1	L1	Stevenage	3	3	0	0	0	12	4	+8	9	Advance to Round 2
2	L1	AFC Wimbledon	3	2	0	0	1	6	7	−1	6	Advance to Round 2
3	L2	Bromley	3	0	1	0	2	5	7	−2	2	
4	ACA	Crystal Palace U21	3	0	0	1	2	6	11	−5	1	

Source: EFL

Win Draw Loss Fixtures

2 September 2025 South Group E	AFC Wimbledon	1–5	Stevenage	Wimbledon
19:00 BST	Sasu (yellow card) 23'; Orsi 31' (pen.)	Report	Patterson 4'; Lubala 15'; Butler (yellow card) 38'; White (yellow card) 43', (goal) 50'; Ahadme 45', 81'	Stadium: Plough Lane; Attendance: 1,375; Referee: Ben Atkinson

7 October 2025 South Group E	Stevenage	2–1	Bromley	Stevenage
19:00 BST	Earley (yellow card) 2'; White 21'; Ahadme 83'	Report	Stepien-Iwumene (yellow card) 45+4'; Webster 68'	Stadium: Broadhall Way; Attendance: 816 (inc. 91 away); Referee: Elliott Swallow

21 October 2025 South Group E	Stevenage	5–2	Crystal Palace U21	Stevenage
19:00 BST	Lee 9' (o.g.); Malcolm 24'; Patterson 37', 77'; Doherty (yellow card) 47'; Pattenden (yellow card) 65'; Butler (yellow card) 87'; Orford 90+1'	Report	King 42'; Rodney 72'	Stadium: Broadhall Way; Attendance: 617 (inc. 83 away); Referee: Stephen Parkinson

2 December 2025 Round of 32	Stevenage	1–2	Walsall	Stevenage
19:00 GMT	Piergianni 57'; Freestone (yellow card) 76'	Report	Richards 63', 72'	Stadium: Broadhall Way; Referee: Alex Chilowicz

== Statistics ==
=== Appearances and goals ===
Players with no appearances are not included on the list; italics indicate loaned in player

No.	Pos	Nat	Player	Total		League One		FA Cup		EFL Cup		EFL Trophy		League One play-offs	
No.	Pos	Nat	Player	Apps	Goals	Apps	Goals	Apps	Goals	Apps	Goals	Apps	Goals	Apps	Goals
1	GK	(England) ENG	Filip Marschall	48	0	45+0	0	1+0	0	0+0	0	0+0	0	2+0	0
2	DF	(Antigua and Barbuda) ANT	Luther James-Wildin	34	1	32+1	1	0+0	0	0+0	0	0+0	0	0+1	0
3	DF	(England) ENG	Dan Butler	22	0	8+8	0	1+0	0	1+0	0	3+0	0	0+1	0
4	MF	(England) ENG	Jordan Houghton	42	0	23+15	0	1+0	0	0+1	0	0+0	0	1+1	0
5	DF	(England) ENG	Carl Piergianni	46	4	40+2	3	1+0	0	0+0	0	1+0	1	2+0	0
6	DF	(England) ENG	Dan Sweeney	32	2	12+15	2	1+0	0	1+0	0	3+0	0	0+0	0
7	FW	(England) ENG	Harry Cornick	8	1	3+5	1	0+0	0	0+0	0	0+0	0	0+0	0
8	MF	(Trinidad and Tobago) TTO	Daniel Phillips	41	1	24+11	1	0+1	0	1+0	0	2+0	0	1+1	0
9	FW	(Morocco) MAR	Gassan Ahadme	17	4	5+8	1	0+1	0	0+0	0	2+1	3	0+0	0
10	MF	(England) ENG	Dan Kemp	49	7	31+12	7	1+0	0	1+0	0	0+2	0	2+0	0
11	MF	(England) ENG	Jordan Roberts	45	2	26+13	2	1+0	0	0+0	0	2+1	0	2+0	0
13	GK	(England) ENG	Taye Ashby-Hammond	6	0	1+0	0	0+0	0	1+0	0	4+0	0	0+0	0
14	DF	(England) ENG	Saxon Earley	23	0	16+3	0	0+0	0	0+0	0	2+0	0	2+0	0
15	DF	(England) ENG	Charlie Goode	45	1	41+0	1	0+0	0	0+1	0	1+0	0	2+0	0
16	DF	(England) ENG	Lewis Freestone	35	3	30+2	2	0+0	0	1+0	1	2+0	0	0+0	0
17	DF	(England) ENG	Jasper Pattenden	37	0	17+12	0	1+0	0	1+0	0	4+0	0	2+0	0
18	MF	(England) ENG	Harvey White	50	6	41+3	4	1+0	0	1+0	0	2+0	2	1+1	0
19	FW	(Northern Ireland) NIR	Jamie Reid	48	14	39+5	14	1+0	0	0+1	0	0+0	0	2+0	0
20	MF	(Wales) WAL	Chem Campbell	32	4	13+15	4	0+1	0	1+0	0	1+1	0	0+0	0
23	MF	(Wales) WAL	Louis Thompson	34	2	18+13	2	0+0	0	0+0	0	1+0	0	1+1	0
24	FW	(England) ENG	Jovan Malcolm	14	1	2+6	0	0+1	0	1+0	0	3+1	1	0+0	0
25	FW	(Scotland) SCO	Matt Phillips	19	2	16+1	2	0+0	0	0+0	0	0+0	0	2+0	0
27	MF	(Wales) WAL	Mathaeus Roberts	2	0	0+0	0	0+0	0	0+1	0	0+1	0	0+0	0
30	FW	(Democratic Republic of the Congo) COD	Beryly Lubala	35	1	10+22	0	0+0	0	0+0	0	2+0	1	0+1	0
33	MF	(England) ENG	Ryan Doherty	8	0	2+1	0	0+0	0	0+1	0	4+0	0	0+0	0
35	FW	(England) ENG	Frank Norris	1	0	0+0	0	0+0	0	0+0	0	0+1	0	0+0	0
40	FW	(England) ENG	Lenny Brown	2	0	0+1	0	0+0	0	0+0	0	0+1	0	0+0	0
42	DF	(England) ENG	Divine Okwara	1	0	0+0	0	0+0	0	0+0	0	0+1	0	0+0	0
44	FW	(Scotland) SCO	Phoenix Patterson	35	4	10+17	1	1+0	0	1+0	0	4+0	3	0+2	0
Player(s) who featured but departed the club during the season:
22	FW	(England) ENG	Jake Young	8	0	0+6	0	0+0	0	0+0	0	0+2	0	0+0	0
26	MF	(England) ENG	Lewis Orford	3	1	0+1	0	0+1	0	0+0	0	1+0	1	0+0	0
