= Mattie Pollock =

English footballer (born 2001)

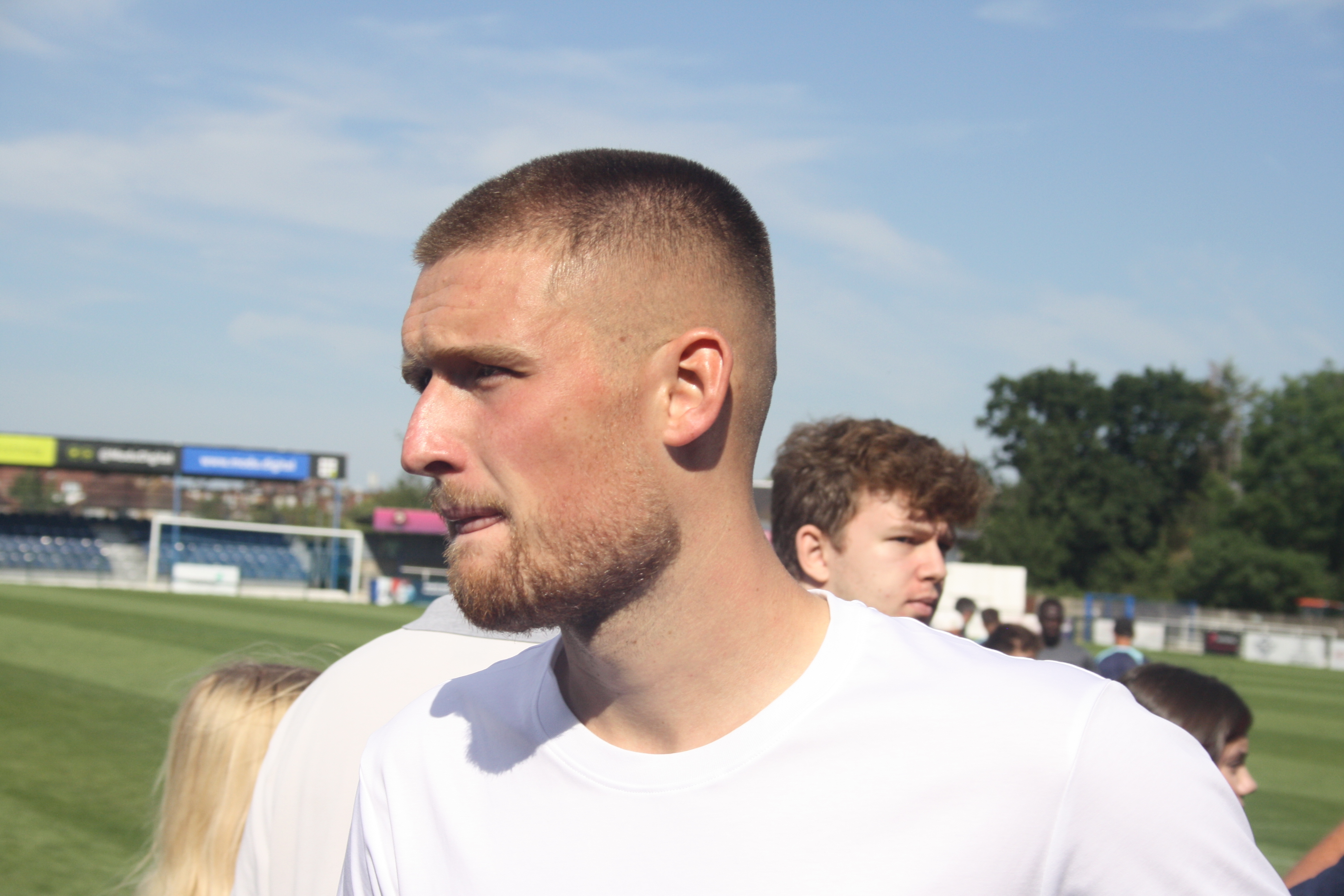
- Mattie Pollock in 2025.

Personal information
- Full name: Mattie William Pollock
- Date of birth: 28 September 2001 (age 25)
- Place of birth: Redhill, Surrey, England
- Height: 6 ft 3 in (1.90 m)
- Position: Centre-back

Team information
- Current team: Watford
- Number: 6

Youth career
- –2011: Middlesbrough
- 2012–2016: Leeds United
- 2016–2018: Polton Allstars
- 2018–2019: Grimsby Town

Senior career*
Years	Team	Apps	(Gls)
2018–2021	Grimsby Town	46	(3)
2021–	Watford	110	(3)
2021–2022	→ Cheltenham Town (loan)	34	(1)
2023	→ Aberdeen (loan)	15	(2)
- * Club domestic league appearances and goals as of 11 October 2026 (UTC)

Mattie William Pollock (born 28 September 2001) is an English professional footballer who plays as a centre-back for EFL Championship club Watford, whom he captains.

Pollock was the product of the youth academies of Middlesbrough and Leeds United before joining Grimsby Town's academy in 2018. He later signed full professional terms with Grimsby and went on to make 46 league appearances for the club before signing for Watford in 2021. He has since spent time on loan with Cheltenham Town.

== Early life ==
Born in Redhill, Pollock was brought up in Middlesbrough, where he attended the Nunthorpe Academy.

== Career ==
Pollock was a trainee with Leeds United up until under-15 level, where he was considered a midfielder.

=== Grimsby Town ===
Pollock joined Grimsby Town on a scholarship in 2018 after being scouted playing as a defender for his father's team, Polton Allstars. He was called up to the first-team bench by manager Michael Jolley for the first time in October 2018. Pollock made his professional debut on 29 December, coming on as a 52nd-minute substitute for Martyn Woolford in a 2–1 win at Exeter City following a red card for centre-back Alex Whitmore. He turned professional in February 2019 and upon signing a 2 1/2-year deal said that "my ultimate ambition is to be the best central defender in the world and play at the highest level I can". Pollock was given his first start for the "Mariners" on 13 August 2019, in a 1–0 victory over Doncaster Rovers at Blundell Park. He scored his first goal for Grimsby in a 1–1 draw with Carlisle United on 24 October 2020.

=== Watford ===
On 27 May 2021, Pollock joined Watford on a five-year deal for an initial fee of £250,000.

On 30 August 2021, Pollock joined Cheltenham Town on loan for the 2021–22 season. Pollock scored his first goal for Cheltenham in the FA Cup first round against Gillingham on 6 November 2021. He also scored in the replay win on 16 November, earning Cheltenham a spot in the second round and praise from manager Michael Duff.

Pollock made his Watford debut on 23 August 2022 in a 2–0 home defeat to MK Dons in the second round of the EFL Cup, and his full Championship debut on 19 October 2022 in a 3–0 away defeat to Millwall. He was loaned to Scottish Premiership club Aberdeen in January 2023.

His first goal for Watford came in the 5-0 win over MK Dons in the EFL Cup in August 2024. In March 2025 he was in the EFL sky bet team of the week for both the championship and EFL team of the week.

Pollock was voted the Watford Player of the Season for the 2025/26 season, collecting his award at home against Coventry City on 2nd May 2026.

== Personal life ==
He is the son of former Middlesbrough and Manchester City midfielder Jamie Pollock, and younger brother to professional footballer Ben Pollock.

== Career statistics ==
As of match played 1 January 2026

Appearances and goals by club, season and competition
Club	Season	League			National cup (Note: Includes Scottish Cup, FA Cup)		League cup (Note: Includes Scottish League Cup, EFL Cup)		Other		Total	
Club	Season	Division	Apps	Goals	Apps	Goals	Apps	Goals	Apps	Goals	Apps	Goals
Grimsby Town	2018–19	League Two	2	0	0	0	0	0	0	0	2	0
Grimsby Town	2019–20	League Two	19	0	2	0	3	0	3 (Note: Appearance(s) in EFL Trophy)	0	27	0
Grimsby Town	2020–21	League Two	25	3	1	0	1	0	2	1	29	4
Grimsby Town	Total		46	3	3	0	4	0	5	1	58	4
Watford	2022–23	Championship	3	0	1	0	1	0	0	0	5	0
Watford	2023–24	Championship	18	0	1	0	0	0	0	0	19	0
Watford	2024–25	Championship	45	2	0	0	2	1	0	0	47	3
Watford	2025–26	Championship	20	1	0	0	0	0	0	0	20	1
Watford	Total		86	3	2	0	3	1	0	0	91	4
Cheltenham Town (loan)	2021–22	League One	34	1	3	2	1	0	1	0	39	3
Aberdeen (loan)	2022–23	Scottish Premiership	15	2	3	2	1	0	1	0	20	4
Career total			181	9	11	4	9	1	7	1	208	15

== Honours ==
Individual

- Cheltenham Town Supporters' Young Player of the Season: 2021–22
