= Tuğra Turhan =

Turkish footballer (born 2007)

Personal information
- Full name: Emir Tuğra Turhan
- Date of birth: 9 August 2007 (age 19)
- Place of birth: Switzerland
- Height: 1.75 m (5 ft 9 in)
- Position: Striker

Team information
- Current team: Stevenage (on loan from İstanbul Başakşehir)
- Number: 19

Youth career
- 2016–2021: FC Rüti
- 2021–2024: Grasshopper

Senior career*
| Years | Team | Apps | (Gls) |
| 2024–2025 | Grasshopper U21 | 20 | (19) |
| 2024–2025 | Grasshopper | 7 | (1) |
| 2025– | İstanbul Başakşehir | 0 | (0) |
| 2026– | → Stevenage (loan) | 3 | (1) |

International career^{‡}
| 2022 | Switzerland U15 | 2 | (0) |
| 2022–2023 | Switzerland U16 | 8 | (3) |
| 2024 | Switzerland U17 | 5 | (1) |
| 2025 | Switzerland U18 | 2 | (0) |
| 2025– | Turkey U19 | 1 | (2) |
- * Club domestic league appearances and goals as of 14:25, 1 October 2025 (UTC) ‡ National team caps and goals as of 14:25, 1 October 2025 (UTC)

Emir Tuğra Turhan (born 9 August 2007) is a professional footballer who plays as a striker for League One club Stevenage, on loan from the under-19 team of Süper Lig club İstanbul Başakşehir. Born in Switzerland, he has opted to play for Turkey internationally.

== Playing career ==
Turhan is a product of the youth academies of the Swiss clubs FC Rüti and Grasshopper. On 14 March 2023, he signed his first professional contract with Grasshopper until 2025 at the age of 15. He was promoted to Grasshopper's reserves for the 2024–25 season and scored 17 goals in 12 games with the team to start, and started training with their senior team in November 2024. He made his senior and professional debut with Grasshopper in a 1–1 Swiss Super League tie with FC Zürich on 30 November 2024. On 4 February 2025, he scored his first top flight goal for Grasshoppers, scoring just two minutes after being subbed on in a 2–2 draw against FC Lausanne-Sport.

=== İstanbul Başakşehir ===
On 11 September 2025, he moved on a free transfer to the Süper Lig club İstanbul Başakşehir on a 3-year contract. He was initially assigned to the club's Under-19 squad.

On 6 September 2026, Turhan joined EFL League One club Stevenage on a season-long loan deal.

== International career ==
Turhan was born in Switzerland to a Turkish family, and holds dual Swiss and Turkish citizenship. He was a youth international for Switzerland, having played with them from U15s to U20s. On 3 October 2025, he was called up to the Turkey U19s for a set of friendlies.
