= Alfie White =

English footballer (1909–1970)

Personal information
- Full name: Alfred White
- Date of birth: 3 March 1909
- Place of birth: Sunderland, County Durham, England
- Date of death: 1970 (aged 60–61)
- Height: 5 ft 8 in (1.73 m)
- Position: Inside right

Senior career*
Years	Team	Apps	(Gls)
- Spennymoor United
1927–1931	Derby County	4	(0)
1931–1936	Bournemouth & Boscombe Athletic	124	(33)
1936–1937	Wrexham	21	(5)
1937–1938	Spennymoor United		
- * Club domestic league appearances and goals

Alfred "Alfie" White (3 March 1909 – 1970) was an English professional footballer who played as an inside right. He made nearly 150 appearances in the English Football League with Derby County, Bournemouth & Boscombe Athletic - where the majority of those appearances were made - and Wrexham.
