= 2025–26 Forest Green Rovers F.C. season =

English football club season

Forest Green Rovers F.C.
2025–26 season
- Chairman: Dale Vince
- Manager: Robbie Savage
- Stadium: The New Lawn
- National League: 7th
- Play-offs: Quarter-finals
- FA Cup: First round
- FA Trophy: Fifth round
- National League Cup: Group stage
- Top goalscorer: League: Kyle McAllister (15); All: Kyle McAllister (18)
- Highest home attendance: 2,802 vs Hartlepool United (6 September 2025, National League)
- Lowest home attendance: 317 vs Wolverhampton Wanderers U21 (16 September 2025, National League Cup)
- Average home league attendance: 2,026

The 2025–26 Forest Green Rovers F.C. season was Forest Green's 137th season in existence, and their second season back in the National League after relegation from League Two in the 2023–24 season. The club competed in the National League, the FA Cup, FA Trophy, and the National League Cup. It was Robbie Savage's first season in charge of Forest Green, after his appointment as first team manager on 1 July 2025.

== Pre-season and friendlies ==
On 27 May 2025, the club announced that 18 players from the previous season would remain at the club, with 6 players leaving upon the expiration of their contract, and 3 loanees returning to their parent clubs.

The club announced their first signing on 27 June 2025, with French centre-forward Yahya Bamba joining the club from National League South side Eastbourne Borough. The club announced 6 more permanent signings before the start of the season, with Laurent Mendy, Tre Pemberton, and Neil Kengni all signing from Savage's former side, Macclesfield Town, alongside Luke McNicholas, Jayden Clarke, Kairo Mitchell, Nick Haughton, and Max Robson.

The club also signed Isaac Moore and Aidan Dausch on loan from Coventry City, and Abraham Kanu on loan from Reading. Forest Green made several more signings before the end of the transfer window.

Forest Green confirmed 4 friendlies against Slimbridge, Buxton, Walsall, and a Derby County XI.

Win Draw Loss

4 July 2025 Friendly	Slimbridge	0–3	Forest Green Rovers	Slimbridge
19:00 BST		Report	Kengni 20'; Doidge 82' (pen.); Knowles 84'	Stadium: Thornhill Park; Attendance: 845

11 July 2025 Friendly	Forest Green Rovers	4–0	Buxton	Nailsworth
	Trialist; McAllister; Doidge (pen.); May	Report		Stadium: The New Lawn

26 July 2025 Friendly	Forest Green Rovers	0–3	Walsall	Nailsworth
		Report	Stuttle 20'; Pressley 31'; Lakin 81'	Stadium: The New Lawn; Attendance: 992

1 August 2025 Friendly	Forest Green Rovers	1–0	Derby County XI	Nailsworth
	Knowles 71'	Report		Stadium: The New Lawn

== Competitions ==
Forest Green played in the National League in the 2025–26 season, as well as in three cup competitions, joining the FA Cup in the Fourth Qualifying Round, the FA Trophy in the Third Round, and the National League Cup in the Group Stage.

=== National League ===
Pos	Team	Pld	W	D	L	GF	GA	GD	Pts	Promotion, qualification or relegation
5	Scunthorpe United	46	23	13	10	77	62	+15	82	Qualification for the National League play-off quarter-finals
6	Southend United	46	23	12	11	83	47	+36	81	Qualification for the National League play-off quarter-finals
7	Forest Green Rovers	46	23	12	11	82	52	+30	81	Qualification for the National League play-off quarter-finals
8	FC Halifax Town	46	20	10	16	69	66	+3	70	
9	Hartlepool United	46	18	14	14	54	59	−5	68	

Source: National League official site
Rules for classification: 1) Points; 2) Goal difference; 3) Number of goals scored; 4) Number of matches won; 5) Head-to-head results

==== Results summary ====
Overall								Home						Away					
Pld	W	D	L	GF	GA	GD	Pts	W	D	L	GF	GA	GD	W	D	L	GF	GA	GD
46	23	12	11	82	52	+30	81	15	5	3	49	22	+27	8	7	8	33	30	+3

Last updated: 22 April 2026.

==== Matches – Regular Season ====
Forest Green's fixtures were announced on 9 July 2025.

9 August 2025 1	Solihull Moors	2–2	Forest Green Rovers	Solihull
15:00 BST	Lipsiuc (red card) 6'; Rutherford 16'; Clarke 75'	Report	Doidge 54'; Haughton 60'	Stadium: Damson Park; Attendance: 1,319; Referee: Ben Atkinson

16 August 2025 2	Forest Green Rovers	2–0	Yeovil Town	Nailsworth
15:00 BST	Buyabu 75'; Mitchell 90+2'	Report	Wannell (yellow card) 22' (yellow-red card) 86'	Stadium: The New Lawn; Attendance: 2,118; Referee: Andrew Humphries

20 August 2025 3	Forest Green Rovers	4–0	Sutton United	Nailsworth
19:45 BST	McAllister 6' (pen.), 72'; Moore-Taylor 24'; Whitwell 69'	Report		Stadium: The New Lawn; Attendance: 1,463; Referee: Elliott Swallow

23 August 2025 4	Halifax Town	1–2	Forest Green Rovers	Halifax
15:00 BST	Turner-Cooke 45'	Report	Bamba 23'; Mitchell 77'	Stadium: The Shay; Attendance: 1,380; Referee: Gareth Rhodes

25 August 2025 5	Forest Green Rovers	1–0	Eastleigh	Nailsworth
15:00 BST	Knowles 90+4'	Report		Stadium: The New Lawn; Attendance: 2,203; Referee: Aaron Farmer

30 August 2025 6	Braintree Town	0–0	Forest Green Rovers	Braintree
15:00 BST		Report		Stadium: Rare Breed Meat Co. Stadium; Attendance: 1,007; Referee: Richard Eley

2 September 2025 7	Morecambe	1–3	Forest Green Rovers	Morecambe
19:45 BST	Edwards 23'	Report	McAllister 34'; Knowles 43', 46'	Stadium: Mazuma Mobile Stadium; Attendance: 2,595; Referee: Zac Kennard-Kettle

6 September 2025 8	Forest Green Rovers	1–0	Hartlepool United	Nailsworth
15:00 BST	Mitchell 23'	Report		Stadium: The New Lawn; Attendance: 2,802; Referee: Michael Barlow

13 September 2025 9	Forest Green Rovers	1–1	Scunthorpe United	Nailsworth
15:00 BST	Balagizi 90+8'	Report	Howe 2'	Stadium: The New Lawn; Attendance: 1,963; Referee: Ross Joyce

20 September 2025 10	Woking	0–2	Forest Green Rovers	Woking
15:00 BST		Report	Clarke 10'; Knowles 59'	Stadium: Laithwaite Community Stadium; Attendance: 2,513; Referee: Greg Rollason

23 September 2025 11	Altrincham	1–2	Forest Green Rovers	Altrincham
19:45 BST	Reddin 32'; Golden (yellow card) 61' (yellow-red card) 61'	Report	Haughton 27'; Inniss 75'	Stadium: J. Davidson Stadium; Attendance: 1,529; Referee: Aaron Jackson

27 September 2025 12	Forest Green Rovers	1–1	York City	Nailsworth
17:30 BST	Mitchell 5'	Report	Pearce 14' (pen.)	Stadium: The New Lawn; Attendance: 2,215; Referee: Martin Woods

1 October 2025 13	Boston United	0–0	Forest Green Rovers	Boston
19:45 BST		Report		Stadium: Jakemans Community Stadium; Attendance: 1,695; Referee: William Davis

4 October 2025 14	Forest Green Rovers	0–1	Rochdale A.F.C.	Nailsworth
15:00 BST		Report	Gordon 44'	Stadium: The New Lawn; Attendance: 2,482; Referee: Tom Reeves

18 October 2025 15	Carlisle United	4–2	Forest Green Rovers	Carlisle
17:30 BST	Linney 18', 45'; Macadam 85'; Kelly 90+2' (pen.)	Report	Clarke 26'; Bunker 53'; Mendy (yellow card) 48' (yellow-red card) 63'	Stadium: Brunton Park; Attendance: 8,598; Referee: James Oldham

25 October 2025 16	Forest Green Rovers	2–1	Boreham Wood	Nailsworth
15:00 BST	Buyabu 34'; Bunker 75' (pen.)	Report	Rush 65'	Stadium: The New Lawn; Attendance: 1,825; Referee: Zac Kennard-Kettle

8 November 2025 17	Aldershot Town	2–3	Forest Green Rovers	Aldershot
12:30 BST	Gilligan 68'; Thomas 71'	Report	McAllister 23', 61'; Clarke 38'	Stadium: EBB Stadium; Attendance: 2,219; Referee: Steven Copeland

11 November 2025 18	Forest Green Rovers	4–2	Tamworth	Nailsworth
19:45 BST	McAllister 34' (pen.); Babalola 36', 59'; Haughton 81'	Report	Cullinane-Liburd (red card) 5'; Duku 15'; Rye 82'	Stadium: The New Lawn; Attendance: 1,472; Referee: Robert Massey-Ellis

11 November 2025 19	Forest Green Rovers	3–1	Gateshead	Nailsworth
15:03 BST	Buyabu 12'; Babalola 25'; Clarke 45'	Report	Butterfield 90+5'	Stadium: The New Lawn; Attendance: 2,386; Referee: Harrison Blair

22 November 2025 20	Wealdstone	1–1	Forest Green Rovers	Ruislip
15:00 BST	Obiero 61'	Report	Moore 25'	Stadium: Grosvenor Vale; Attendance: 1,560; Referee: Will Finnie

29 November 2025 21	Forest Green Rovers	2–1	Southend United	Nailsworth
15:00 BST	Whitwell 78'; McAllister 80'	Report	Spasov 68'	Stadium: The New Lawn; Attendance: 2,659; Referee: Declan Brown

6 December 2025 22	Forest Green Rovers	1–1	Solihull Moors	Nailsworth
15:00 BST	Haughton 62'	Report	Whitmore 43'	Stadium: The New Lawn; Attendance: 1,894; Referee: Paul Johnson

20 December 2025 23	Yeovil Town	0–2	Forest Green Rovers	Yeovil
19:45 BST		Report	Babalola 16'; Ward 60' (o.g.); Bunker (yellow card) 33' (yellow-red card) 65'	Stadium: Huish Park; Attendance: 3,179; Referee: Alan Dale

26 December 2025 24	Brackley Town	1–0	Forest Green Rovers	Brackley
15:00 BST	Nottingham 16'	Report		Stadium: St James Park; Attendance: 1,497; Referee: Oliver Mackey

30 December 2025 25	Forest Green Rovers	1–1	Truro City	Nailsworth
19:45 BST	Buyabu 30'	Report	Deeming 35'	Stadium: The New Lawn; Attendance: 2,161; Referee: Jason Richardson

3 January 2026 26	Forest Green Rovers	2–1	Halifax Town	Nailsworth
15:00 BST	Rees 67', 78'	Report	Hugill 45+2'	Stadium: The New Lawn; Attendance: 2,436; Referee: Martin Ross

17 January 2026 27	Sutton United	1–1	Forest Green Rovers	Sutton
15:00 BST	Harris 89'	Report	McAllister 21' (pen.); Rees (yellow card) 31' (yellow-red card) 37'	Stadium: VBS Community Stadium; Attendance: 2,300; Referee: Callum Walchester

21 January 2026 28	Forest Green Rovers	1–1	Altrincham	Nailsworth
19:45 BST	Clarke 58'	Report	Crankshaw 11'	Stadium: The New Lawn; Attendance: 1,251; Referee: Matthew Scholes

24 January 2026 29	Scunthorpe United	3–2	Forest Green Rovers	Scunthorpe
17:30 BST	Whitehall 38' (pen.); Westbrooke 50'; Ubaezuonu 75'	Report	Rees 5'; Buyabu 57'	Stadium: Attis Arena; Attendance: 5,215; Referee: Ross Joyce

3 February 2026 30	Forest Green Rovers	4–2	Woking	Nailsworth
19:45 BST	Andrews 14' (og.); Haughton 51'; Rees 54'; Knowles 77'	Report	Sanderson 10'; Gbodé 15'	Stadium: The New Lawn; Attendance: 1,081; Referee: Elliott Swallow

7 February 2026 31	York City	2–1	Forest Green Rovers	York
15:00 BST	Hunt 16' (pen.); Pearce 45+3'	Report	McAllister 65'	Stadium: LNER Community Stadium; Attendance: 6,686; Referee: Martin Coy

11 February 2026 32	Rochdale	2–1	Forest Green Rovers	Rochdale
19:45 BST	Dieseruvwe 2', 64'	Report	McAllister 43'	Stadium: Crown Oil Arena; Attendance: 2,646; Referee: Richard Eley

14 February 2026 33	Forest Green Rovers	1–3	Carlisle United	Nailsworth
17:30 BST	Mingi 52'	Report	Wearne 11'; Feeney 22'; Ajiboye 29'	Stadium: The New Lawn; Attendance: 2,353; Referee: Carl Brook

21 February 2026 34	Boreham Wood	1–1	Forest Green Rovers	Borehamwood
15:00 BST	Richardson 52'	Report	McAllister 65' (pen.); Osude (red card) 83'	Stadium: Meadow Park; Attendance: 1,141; Referee: Neil Hair

24 February 2026 35	Forest Green Rovers	2–3	Boston United	Nailsworth
19:45 BST	Bunker 71'; Knowles 90+1'	Report	Maguire 12' (pen.); Grimes 29'; Cursons 38'	Stadium: The New Lawn; Attendance: 1,259; Referee: Harrison Blair

28 February 2026 36	Gateshead	0–2	Forest Green Rovers	Gateshead
15:00 BST		Report	Knowles 5'; Nwoko 56'	Stadium: Gateshead International Stadium; Attendance: 702; Referee: Matthew McQuillan

7 March 2026 37	Forest Green Rovers	2–1	Aldershot Town	Nailsworth
15:00 BST	Campbell 15'; Knowles 28'	Report	Warren 65'	Stadium: The New Lawn; Attendance: 2,281; Referee: Declan Brown

14 March 2026 38	Southend United	2–0	Forest Green Rovers	Southend-on-Sea
15:00 BST	Golding 3'; Scott-Morriss 72'	Report		Stadium: Roots Hall; Attendance: 8,702; Referee: Paul Howard

21 March 2026 39	Forest Green Rovers	2–0	Wealdstone	Nailsworth
15:00 BST	Kengni 41'; Kircough 63'	Report		Stadium: The New Lawn; Attendance: 1,738; Referee: Lewis Sandoe

25 March 2026 40	Tamworth	1–0	Forest Green Rovers	Tamworth
19:45 BST	Creaney 90+2'	Report		Stadium: The Lamb Ground; Attendance: 931; Referee: Lee Swabey

28 March 2026 41	Eastleigh	2–4	Forest Green Rovers	Eastleigh
15:00 BST	Saunders 22', 32'	Report	Mellor 44'; McAllister 52' (pen.), 66'; Haughton 90+5'	Stadium: Silverlake Stadium; Attendance: 2,552; Referee: Emily Heaslip

3 April 2026 42	Forest Green Rovers	4–0	Brackley Town	Nailsworth
15:00 BST	Mellor 45+5'; McAllister 74'; Buyabu 76'; Mendy 88'	Report	Brown (yellow card) 36' (yellow-red card) 45+2'	Stadium: The New Lawn; Attendance: 2,095; Referee: Craig Hicks

6 April 2026 43	Truro City	1–1	Forest Green Rovers	Truro
15:00 BST	Jephcott 84'	Report	Kanu (red card); Knowles 75'	Stadium: Truro City Stadium; Attendance: 2,428; Referee: Sam Mulhall

11 April 2026 44	Forest Green Rovers	3–1	Braintree Town	Nailsworth
15:00 BST	Mellor 37'; Knowles 71'; Haughton 73'	Report	Walker 58'	Stadium: The New Lawn; Attendance: 1,969; Referee: Dale Baines

18 April 2026 45	Hartlepool United	2–1	Forest Green Rovers	Hartlepool
15:00 BST	Campbell 35'; McNally 45+1'	Report	McAllister 90'	Stadium: Victoria Park; Attendance: 3,450; Referee: Ollie Yates

25 April 2026 46	Forest Green Rovers	5–0	Morecambe	Nailsworth
12:30 BST	Buyabu 13'; McAllister 23' (pen.); Kircough 56'; Rees 78', 83'	Report		Stadium: The New Lawn; Attendance: 2,482; Referee: Matthew Russell

==== Play-offs ====
Forest Green entered the play-offs after finishing 7th in the National League. This meant that they would face the team who finished in 4th, which was Boreham Wood.

29 April 2026 Promotion Play-offs Qualifying Round	Boreham Wood	1–0	Forest Green Rovers	Borehamwood
19:45 BST	Brunt 105+3'	Report		Stadium: Meadow Park; Attendance: 2,452; Referee: Kirsty Dowle

=== FA Cup ===
On 29 September 2025, Forest Green were drawn away to Worthing in the FA Cup fourth round qualifying.

13 October 2025 Fourth qualifying round	Worthing	1–4	Forest Green Rovers	Worthing
19:30 BST	Jenks 45+1'	Report	Whitwell 13'; Knowles 23'; Bunker 69'; Clarke 74' (pen.)	Stadium: Sussex Transport Community Stadium; Attendance: 3,033; Referee: Harrison Blair

31 October 2025 First round	Luton Town	4–3	Forest Green Rovers	Luton
19:30 BST	Fanne 23'; Wells 30', 53'; Kodua 90+2'	Report	Knowles 61'; McAllister 68' (pen.); Dausch 79'	Stadium: Kenilworth Road; Attendance: 4,511; Referee: Stephen Parkinson

=== FA Trophy ===
On 17 November 2025, Forest Green were drawn at home against National League South side Weston-super-mare, with the game set to take place on 13 December 2025.

13 December 2025 Third round	Forest Green Rovers	4–0	Weston-super-Mare	Nailsworth
15:00 BST	McAllister 51', 58'; Clarke 70', 83'	Report		Stadium: The New Lawn; Attendance: 973; Referee: Matthew Scholes

10 January 2026 Fourth round	Ebbsfleet United	0–2	Forest Green Rovers	Northfleet
15:00 BST		Report	Moore 41'; Kanu 87'	Stadium: Kuflink Stadium; Attendance: 887; Referee: Richie Watkins

31 January 2026 Fifth round	Forest Green Rovers	0–3	Wealdstone	Nailsworth
15:00 BST		Report	Boldewijn 22'; Olomola 59'; Adarkwa 90+5'	Stadium: The New Lawn; Attendance: 1,607; Referee: James Durkin

=== National League Cup ===
==== Group stage ====
On 14 July 2025, Forest Green were drawn into Group B of the 2025–26 National League Cup, alongside Boreham Wood, Braintree Town, Wealdstone, Nottingham Forest U21, West Bromwich Albion U21, Leicester CIty U21, and Wolverhampton Wanderers U21. Due to the format of the competition, Forest Green would play four home games in the group stage, against the under 21 sides in the group, which was the case for Boreham Wood, Braintree, and Wealdstone.

13 August 2025 1	Forest Green Rovers	3–1	West Bromwich Albion U21	Nailsworth
19:00 BST	Marquez 29'; Knowles 60'; Conteh 86'	Report	Bostock 66'	Stadium: The New Lawn; Attendance: 417; Referee: Lewis Sandoe

16 September 2025 2	Forest Green Rovers	3–2	Wolverhampton Wanderers U21	Nailsworth
19:00 BST	Marquez 45+3'; Moore 62'; Cardwell 67'	Report	Mané 52'; Ángel 87'	Stadium: The New Lawn; Attendance: 317; Referee: Matthew Scholes

21 October 2025 3	Forest Green Rovers	2–2 (3–5 p)	Leicester City U21	Nailsworth
19:00 BST	Haughton 11'; Marquez 71'	Report	Evans 9'; Onanaye 17'	Stadium: The New Lawn; Attendance: 340
	Penalties
	Marquez (penalty scored); Haughton (penalty missed); Balagizi (penalty scored); Bamba (penalty scored)		(penalty scored) Evans; (penalty scored) Aluko; (penalty scored) Daniels; (penalty scored) Richards; (penalty scored) Onanaye

25 November 2025 4	Forest Green Rovers	0–1	Nottingham Forest U21	Nailsworth
19:00 BST		Report	Thompson 50'	Stadium: The New Lawn; Attendance: 265; Referee: Lewis Sandoe

== Squad statistics ==
As of match played 29 April 2026

No.	Pos.	Nat.	Name	League		Play-offs		FA Cup		FA Trophy		National League Cup		Total		Discipline	
No.	Pos.	Nat.	Name	Apps	Goals	Apps	Goals	Apps	Goals	Apps	Goals	Apps	Goals	Apps	Goals	Yellow card	Red card
1	GK	IRE	Luke McNicholas	16	0	0	0	1	0	1	0	1	0	19	0	0	0
2	DF	IRE	Sean Long	0+1	0	0	0	0	0	0	0	1+2	0	1+3	0	0	0
3	DF	ENG	Neil Kengni	16+19	1	0+1	0	2	0	2+1	0	3	0	23+21	1	2	0
4	DF	WAL	Cian Harries	0+1	0	0	0	0	0	0	0	0	0	0+1	0	0	0
5	DF	ENG	Ryan Inniss	13+6	1	0	0	1+1	0	0	0	2+1	0	16+8	1	2	0
6	DF	FRA	Laurent Mendy	44	1	1	0	2	0	3	0	1	0	51	1	7	1
7	MF	SCO	Kyle McAllister	42	15	1	0	0+1	1	2+1	2	1	0	45+2	18	5	0
8	MF	ENG	Nick Haughton	23+11	7	0+1	0	1	0	2	0	3	1	29+12	8	2	0
9	FW	WAL	Christian Doidge	4+14	1	0+1	0	1	0	0+1	0	1	0	6+16	1	0	0
10	MF	ENG	Liam Sercombe	0	0	0	0	0	0	0	0	0+1	0	0+1	0	0	0
11	MF	ENG	Tom Knowles	31+14	10	1	0	1+1	2	1+1	0	3	1	37+16	13	12	0
12	GK	IRE	Fiachra Pagel	1	0	0	0	1	0	0	0	3	0	5	0	0	0
14	MF	ENG	Jayden Clarke	25+14	3	1	0	0+1	1	1+2	2	1	0	28+17	6	3	0
15	DF	ENG	Jordan Moore-Taylor	18+6	1	0	0	0	0	0	0	1	0	19+6	1	1	0
16	MF	ENG	Harvey Bunker	12+15	2	0	0	1+1	1	1+2	0	2	0	16+18	3	4	1
17	DF	ENG	Elijah Morrison	4+4	0	0	0	0	0	1	0	0	0	5+4	0	1	0
18	MF	ENG	Tate Campbell	14+1	1	1	0	0	0	0	0	0	0	15+1	1	3	0
19	DF	ENG	Jay Mingi	8+1	1	1	0	0	0	1	0	0	0	10+1	1	2	0
21	MF	ENG	Tre Pemberton	18+12	0	1	0	2	0	2+1	0	2+1	0	25+14	0	6	0
22	MF	ENG	Max Robson	0+6	0	0	0	0+1	0	1	0	0+1	0	1+8	0	0	0
24	DF	ENG	Jili Buyabu	29+6	7	1	0	2	0	2+1	0	2	0	36+7	7	10	0
25	DF	WAL	Gabe Kircough	8+5	2	0	0	0	0	1	0	0	0	9+5	2	3	0
26	MF	ENG	Chibuzo Nwoko	17+2	1	0+1	0	0	0	2	0	0	0	19+3	1	4	0
27	FW	ENG	Temi Babalola	14+5	4	0	0	1	0	1+2	0	1	0	17+7	4	3	0
28	FW	ENG	Sean Etaluku	2	0	1	0	1	0	0	0	0	0	4	0	0	0
29	FW	GRN	Kairo Mitchell	13+9	4	0	0	0+1	0	1+1	0	0	0	14+11	4	1	0
31	MF	ENG	Stephen Walsh	0	0	0	0	0	0	0	0	1	0	1	0	0	0
32	DF	SLE	Abraham Kanu	34+2	0	0	0	1	0	2+1	1	1	0	38+3	1	4	1
33	DF	ENG	Keon Sanniola	0	0	0	0	0	0	0	0	0	0	0	0	0	0
34	MF	ENG	Thomas Conteh	0	0	0	0	0	0	0	0	2+2	1	2+2	1	0	0
37	FW	ENG	Jose Marquez	0+5	0	0	0	0	0	0	0	3	3	3+5	3	0	0
38	MF	ENG	Akai Bonnick	0	0	0	0	0	0	0	0	0+3	0	0+3	0	0	0
42	GK	ENG	Harry Isted	29	0	1	0	0	0	2	0	0	0	32	0	1	0
43	FW	ENG	Joshua Osude	0+4	0	0	0	0	0	0	0	0	0	0+4	0	0	1
44	FW	ENG	D'Mani Mellor	10	3	1	0	0	0	0	0	0	0	11	3	2	0
45	FW	WAL	Ricardo Rees	11+2	6	0+1	0	0	0	0	0	0	0	11+3	6	2	1
47	DF	ENG	Ashqar Ahmed	8+5	0	0	0	0	0	0	0	0	0	8+5	0	0	0
Player(s) who featured but departed the club during the season:
17	MF	USA	Aidan Dausch	1+7	0	0	0	0+1	1	1	0	2	0	4+8	1	0	0
18	MF	ENG	Isaac Moore	16+6	1	0	0	1	0	2	1	3	1	22+6	3	4	0
19	MF	ENG	Adam May	0+1	0	0	0	0	0	0	0	0+1	0	0+2	0	0	0
20	FW	FRA	Yahya Bamba	6+8	1	0	0	0+1	0	0+1	0	0+2	0	6+12	1	3	0
23	FW	SCO	Harry Cardwell	0+5	0	0	0	0	0	0	0	1+1	1	1+6	1	0	0
25	MF	ENG	Harry Whitwell	20+3	2	0	0	2	1	1	0	0	0	23+3	3	6	0
26	MF	ENG	James Balagizi	1+6	1	0	0	1+1	0	0	0	1+1	0	3+8	1	1	0
27	FW	ENG	Adriel Walker	0+3	0	0	0	0	0	0	0	0	0	0+3	0	0	0
35	DF	ENG	Will Merrett	0	0	0	0	0	0	0	0	1+2	0	1+2	0	0	0
45	MF	ENG	Jesse Aldridge	0	0	0	0	0	0	0	0	0+1	0	0+1	0	0	0

== Transfers ==
=== In ===
Date	Pos.	Name	From	Fee	Ref.
27 June 2025	FW	(France) Yahya Bamba	(England) Eastbourne Borough	Undisclosed	
2 July 2025	DF	(England) Neil Kengni	(England) Macclesfield	Undisclosed	
2 July 2025	MF	(France) Laurent Mendy	(England) Macclesfield	Undisclosed	
2 July 2025	DF	(England) Tre Pemberton	(England) Macclesfield	Undisclosed	
3 July 2025	GK	(Republic of Ireland) Luke McNicholas	(Wales) Wrexham	Undisclosed	
10 July 2025	MF	(England) Jayden Clarke	Unattached	Free	
12 July 2025	FW	(Grenada) Kairo Mitchell	Unattached	Free	
6 August 2025	MF	(England) Nick Haughton	(England) AFC Fylde	Undisclosed	
7 August 2025	MF	(England) Max Robson	(England) Tottenham Hotspur	Free	
17 October 2025	FW	(England) Temi Babalola	(England) Worthing	Undisclosed	
28 October 2025	FW	(England) Sean Etaluku	(England) Macclesfield	Undisclosed	
7 November 2025	GK	(England) Harry Isted	Unattached	Free	
31 December 2025	FW	(Wales) Ricardo Rees	(Wales) Merthyr Town	Undisclosed	
12 January 2026	DF	(Wales) Gabe Kircough	(Wales) Penybont	Undisclosed	
5 February 2026	MF	(England) Tate Campbell	(England) Buxton	Undisclosed	
13 February 2026	FW	(England) Joshua Osude	(England) Woking	Undisclosed	
6 March 2026	FW	(England) D'Mani Mellor	(England) Macclesfield	Undisclosed	

=== Out ===
Date	Pos.	Name	To	Fee	Ref.
7 August 2025	DF	(Scotland) Jamie Robson	(England) Oldham Athletic	Undisclosed	
7 August 2025	FW	(Republic of Ireland) Joe Quigley	(England) Oldham Athletic	Undisclosed	
6 December 2025	MF	(England) Adam May	(England) Weston-super-Mare	Undisclosed	

=== Loaned out ===
Date from	Date to	Pos.	Name	To	Ref.
15 July 2025	31 May 2025	DF	(England) Will Merrett	(England) Alvechurch	
8 August 2025	29 October 2025	MF	(England) Akai Bonnick	(England) Hartpury College	
22 August 2025	22 September 2025	FW	(England) Jose Marquez	(England) Alvechurch	
30 October 2025	4 January 2026	MF	(England) Akai Bonnick	(England) Alvechurch	
30 October 2025	18 December 2025	FW	(England) Jose Marquez	(England) Dorking Wanderers	
13 November 2025	11 December 2025	MF	(England) Liam Sercombe	(England) Weston-super-Mare	
4 December 2025	31 May 2025	FW	(Scotland) Harry Cardwell	(England) Southend United	
6 January 2026	6 February 2026	FW	(France) Yahya Bamba	(England) Brackley Town	
23 January 2026	31 May 2026	MF	(England) Akai Bonnick	(England) Bromsgrove Sporting	

=== Loaned in ===
Date from	Date to	Pos.	Name	From	Ref.
10 July 2025	27 January 2026	MF	(England) Isaac Moore	(England) Coventry City	
24 July 2025	31 May 2026	DF	(Sierra Leone) Abraham Kanu	(England) Reading	
4 August 2025	9 January 2026	FW	(United States) Aidan Dausch	(England) Coventry City	
14 August 2025	31 May 2026	DF	(England) Jili Buyabu	(England) Sheffield United	
15 August 2025	7 January 2026	MF	(England) Harry Whitwell	(England) West Bromwich Albion	
28 August 2025	6 January 2026	MF	(England) James Balagizi	(England) Liverpool	
5 September 2025	31 October 2025	FW	(England) Adriel Walker	(England) Stoke City	
8 January 2026	31 May 2026	MF	(England) Chibuzo Nwoko	(England) Fulham	
13 January 2026	31 May 2026	DF	(England) Elijah Morrison	(England) Bristol City	
23 January 2026	31 May 2026	DF	(England) Jay Mingi	(England) Stockport County	
6 February 2026	31 May 2026	DF	(England) Ashqar Ahmed	(England) Reading	

=== Released / Out of Contract ===
Date	Pos.	Name	Subsequent club	Join date	Ref.
1 July 2025	MF	(England) Teddy Jenks	(England) Worthing	16 September 2025	
1 July 2025	MF	(Republic of Ireland) Emmanuel Osadebe	(England) Barnet	1 July 2025	
1 July 2025	GK	(New Zealand) Jamie Searle	(England) Eastbourne Borough	1 July 2025	
1 July 2025	DF	(England) Ben Tozer	Retired	1 July 2025	
1 July 2025	FW	(Belgium) Tyrese Omotoye	(Czech Republic) Vysočina Jihlava	16 July 2025	
1 July 2025	FW	(England) Jordon Garrick	(England) St. Pats	6 August 2025	
6 August 2025	MF	(Northern Ireland) Charlie McCann	(England) Barrow	30 September 2025	
