= 2023–24 Forest Green Rovers F.C. season =

135th season in existence of Forest Green Rovers FC

Forest Green Rovers
2023–24 season
- Owner: Dale Vince
- Chairman: Dale Vince
- Manager: Hannah Dingley (until 17 July); David Horseman (until 20 December); Troy Deeney (from 20 December to 18 January); Dan Connor (interim from 18 to 25 January); Steve Cotterill (from 25 January)
- Stadium: The New Lawn
- League Two: 24th (relegated to National League)
- FA Cup: Second round
- EFL Cup: First round
- EFL Trophy: Second round
- Top goalscorer: League: Matty Stevens (9); All: Matty Stevens (11)
- Highest home attendance: vs Wrexham A.F.C. (4,121)
- Lowest home attendance: vs Shrewsbury Town F.C. (709)
- Average home league attendance: (3,204)
- Biggest win: vs Colchester United F.C. (5-0)
- Biggest defeat: vs Wrexham A.F.C. (6-0)

The 2023–24 season was the 135th season in the history of Forest Green Rovers and their first season back in League Two since the 2021–22 season following their relegation from League One in the previous season. The club participated in League Two, the FA Cup, the EFL Cup, and the EFL Trophy.

== Current squad ==
As of 9 February 2024

No.	Name	Position	Nationality	Place of birth	Date of birth (age)	Previous club	Date signed	Fee	Contract end
Goalkeepers
1	Luke Daniels	GK	(England)	Bolton	5 January 1988 (age 38)	Middlesbrough	14 July 2023	Free	30 June 2024
20	Jamie Searle	GK	(New Zealand)	Whakatāne	25 November 2000 (age 25)	Barnsley	22 July 2023	Undisclosed	30 June 2025
31	Tommy Simkin	GK	(England)		8 December 2004 (age 21)	Stoke City	12 January 2024	Loan	31 May 2024
39	Vicente Reyes	GK	(Chile)	(United States) Charleston	19 November 2003 (age 22)	Norwich City	13 February 2024	Loan	20 February 2024
41	Fiachra Pagel	GK	(Republic of Ireland)		16 February 2004 (age 22)	(Republic of Ireland) Drogheda United	2 January 2023	Undisclosed	30 June 2024
Defenders
2	Marcel Lavinier	RB	(Portugal)	(England) London	16 December 2000 (age 25)	Swindon Town	3 August 2023	Undisclosed	30 June 2025
3	Dom Bernard	CB	(Republic of Ireland)	(England) Gloucester	29 March 1997 (age 29)	Birmingham City	17 July 2019	Free	30 June 2024
4	Darnell Johnson	CB	(England)	Leicester	3 September 1998 (age 28)	Fleetwood Town	4 August 2023	Free	30 June 2025
5	Ryan Inniss	CB	(England)	Penge	5 June 1995 (age 31)	Charlton Athletic	1 July 2023	Free	30 June 2025
15	Jordan Moore-Taylor	CB	(England)	Exeter	21 January 1994 (age 32)	Milton Keynes Dons	21 July 2020	Free	30 June 2024
16	Dominic Thompson	LB	(England)	Willesden	26 July 2000 (age 26)	Blackpool	12 January 2024	Loan	31 May 2024
17	Jamie Robson	LB	(Scotland)	Perth	19 December 1997 (age 28)	Lincoln City	6 January 2023	Undisclosed	30 June 2024
19	Sean Robertson	RB	(England)	Wandsworth	6 June 2001 (age 25)	Crystal Palace	4 August 2022	Free	30 June 2024
25	Fankaty Dabo	RB	(England)	Southwark	11 October 1995 (age 31)	Coventry City	1 September 2023	Free	30 June 2025
36	Richard Keogh	CB	(Republic of Ireland)	(England) Harlow	11 August 1986 (age 40)	Wycombe Wanderers	9 February 2024	Free	30 June 2024
44	Murphy Bennett	RB	(Wales)	(England) Stockport	23 December 2004 (age 21)	Manchester City	1 July 2021	Undisclosed	30 June 2024
	Keon Sanniola	CB	(England)			Academy	5 September 2023	Trainee	30 June 2024
Midfielders
8	Charlie McCann	DM	(Northern Ireland)	(England) Coventry	24 April 2002 (age 24)	(Scotland) Rangers	24 January 2023	£300,000	30 June 2026
18	Jacob Maddox	AM	(England)	Bristol	3 November 1998 (age 28)	Walsall	7 August 2023	Free	30 June 2025
21	Alex Rodríguez	CM	(Spain)	Tenerife	1 August 1993 (age 33)	Oxford United	12 January 2024	Free	30 June 2024
22	Maxi Oyedele	DM	(Poland)	(England) Salford	7 November 2004 (age 22)	Manchester United	17 January 2024	Loan	31 May 2024
26	David Davis	CM	(England)	Smethwick	20 February 1991 (age 35)	Shrewsbury Town	1 July 2022	Free	30 June 2024
27	Harvey Bunker	DM	(England)	Portsmouth	15 April 2003 (age 23)	Academy	1 July 2020	Trainee	30 June 2024
28	Callum Jones	CM	(Wales)	(England) Birkenhead	5 April 2001 (age 25)	Hull City	1 July 2023	Loan	31 May 2024
29	Reece Brown	CM	(England)	Dudley	3 March 1996 (age 30)	Huddersfield Town	1 July 2022	Free	30 June 2024
32	Jack Carter	CM	(England)			Academy	1 July 2023	Trainee	30 June 2024
34	Zach McKenzie	CM	(England)			Academy	1 July 2023	Trainee	30 June 2024
40	Fin Bell	CM	(England)			Academy	1 July 2023	Trainee	30 June 2024
46	Emmanuel Osadebe	RM	(Republic of Ireland)	Dundalk	1 October 1996 (age 30)	Bradford City	18 January 2024	Undisclosed	30 June 2025
51	Jesse Thompson	CM	(England)		29 November 2005 (age 20)	Reading	1 July 2022	Free	30 June 2024
—	Dylan Kadji	DM	(England)		1 September 2003 (age 23)	Bristol City	4 August 2023	Loan	31 May 2024
Forwards
7	Kyle McAllister	RW	(Scotland)	Paisley	21 January 1999 (age 27)	(Scotland) St Mirren	1 July 2022	Free	30 June 2025
9	Matty Stevens	CF	(England)	Guildford	12 February 1998 (age 28)	Peterborough United	27 July 2019	Undisclosed	30 June 2024
10	Christian Doidge	CF	(Wales)	Newport	25 August 1992 (age 34)	(Scotland) Hibernian	31 January 2024	Undisclosed	30 June 2025
11	Jordon Garrick	RW	(England)	(Jamaica) Kingston	15 July 1998 (age 28)	Swansea City	5 January 2023	Undisclosed	30 June 2024
23	Tyrese Omotoye	CF	(Belgium)	Hasselt	23 September 2002 (age 24)	Norwich City	23 January 2023	Undisclosed	30 June 2024
24	Olly Sully	CF	(England)		8 September 2005 (age 21)	Academy	5 September 2023	—N/a	30 June 2024
37	Nathan Holland	LW	(England)	Manchester	19 June 1998 (age 28)	Milton Keynes Dons	24 August 2023	Undisclosed	30 June 2025
Out on Loan
6	Teddy Jenks	CM	(England)	Brighton	12 March 2002 (age 24)	Brighton & Hove Albion	1 July 2023	Free	30 June 2025
12	Alfie Bendle	CM	(England)		27 January 2005 (age 21)	AFC Wimbledon	9 August 2023	Free	30 June 2025
—N/a	Amadou Bakayoko	CF	(Sierra Leone)	Kenema	1 January 1996 (age 30)	Bolton Wanderers	12 January 2023	Undisclosed	30 June 2024

== Transfers ==
=== In ===
Date	Pos	Player	From	Fee	Ref
1 July 2023	CB	(England) Ryan Inniss	(England) Charlton Athletic	Free Transfer	
1 July 2023	CM	(England) Teddy Jenks	(England) Brighton & Hove Albion	Free Transfer	
14 July 2023	GK	(England) Luke Daniels	(England) Middlesbrough	Free Transfer	
17 July 2023	CF	(England) Matty Taylor	(England) Oxford United	Free Transfer	
22 July 2023	GK	(New Zealand) Jamie Searle	(England) Barnsley	Undisclosed	
3 August 2023	RB	(Portugal) Marcel Lavinier	(England) Swindon Town	Undisclosed	
4 August 2023	CB	(England) Darnell Johnson	(England) Fleetwood Town	Free Transfer	
7 August 2023	AM	(England) Jacob Maddox	(England) Walsall	Free Transfer	
9 August 2023	CM	(England) Alfie Bendle	(England) AFC Wimbledon	Free Transfer	
17 August 2023	CF	(England) Troy Deeney	(England) Birmingham City	Free Transfer	
24 August 2023	LW	(England) Nathan Holland	(England) Milton Keynes Dons	Undisclosed	
1 September 2023	RB	(England) Fankaty Dabo	(England) Coventry City	Free Transfer	
12 January 2024	CM	(Spain) Alex Rodríguez	(England) Oxford United	Free Transfer	
18 January 2024	RM	(Republic of Ireland) Emmanuel Osadebe	(England) Bradford City	Undisclosed	
31 January 2024	CF	(Wales) Christian Doidge	(Scotland) Hibernian	Undisclosed	
9 February 2024	CB	(Republic of Ireland) Richard Keogh	(England) Wycombe Wanderers	Free Transfer	

=== Out ===
Date	Pos	Player	Transferred to	Fee	Ref
30 June 2023	GK	(England) Alfie Burnett	Free agent	Released	
30 June 2023	CB	(England) Baily Cargill	(England) Mansfield Town	Released	
30 June 2023	CM	(Scotland) Regan Hendry	(England) Tranmere Rovers	Released	
30 June 2023	LB	(Wales) Jacob Jones	(Scotland) Cove Rangers	Released	
30 June 2023	GK	(England) Luke McGee	(England) Tranmere Rovers	Released	
30 June 2023	CM	(Scotland) Dylan McGeouch	(England) Carlisle United	Released	
30 June 2023	CF	(Republic of Ireland) Sean O'Brien	(England) Hayes & Yeading United	Released	
30 June 2023	CM	(England) Ben Stevenson	(England) Portsmouth	Released	
30 June 2023	GK	(Wales) Lewis Thomas	Free agent	Released	
6 July 2023	GK	(Scotland) Ross Doohan	(Scotland) Aberdeen	Undisclosed	
6 July 2023	CM	(England) Armani Little	(England) AFC Wimbledon	Undisclosed	
25 July 2023	RB	(Republic of Ireland) Corey O'Keeffe	(England) Barnsley	Undisclosed	
3 August 2023	CB	(England) Udoka Godwin-Malife	(England) Swindon Town	Undisclosed	
1 February 2024	CF	(England) Matty Taylor	(England) Cheltenham Town	Free Transfer	

=== Loaned in ===
Date	Pos	Player	Loaned from	Date until	Ref
1 July 2023	CM	(Wales) Callum Jones	(England) Hull City	End of Season	
4 August 2023	DM	(England) Dylan Kadji	(England) Bristol City	End of Season	
10 August 2023	CB	(England) Reece Welch	(England) Everton	3 January 2024 (Note: On 3 January, Welch was recalled back by Everton from his season-long loan.)	
1 September 2023	CF	(England) Callum Morton	(England) Salford City	End of Season	
30 September 2023	GK	(England) James Belshaw	(England) Bristol Rovers	7 October 2023	
12 January 2024	GK	(England) Tommy Simkin	(England) Stoke City	End of Season	
12 January 2024	LB	(England) Dominic Thompson	(England) Blackpool	End of Season	
17 January 2024	DM	(Poland) Maxi Oyedele	(England) Manchester United	End of Season	
13 February 2024	GK	(Chile) Vicente Reyes	(England) Norwich City	20 February 2024	

=== Loaned out ===
Date	Pos	Player	Loaned to	Until	Ref
27 July 2023	CF	(Sierra Leone) Amadou Bakayoko	(Scotland) Dundee	End of Season	
25 January 2024	CM	(England) Teddy Jenks	(Scotland) Ross County	End of Season	
2 February 2024	CM	(England) Alfie Bendle	(England) Eastbourne Borough	1 March 2024	

== Pre-season and friendlies ==
On 7 June, FGR announced four pre-season fixtures, against Melksham Town, Coventry City, Everton Under-21s and Plymouth Argyle. A fifth was later added, against West Bromwich Albion.

Win Draw Loss Fixtures

5 July 2023 Friendly	Melksham Town	1–1	Forest Green Rovers	Melksham
19:30 BST			Jones 85'	Stadium: Oakfield Stadium

11 July 2023 Friendly	UCD	0–2	Forest Green Rovers	Dublin, Ireland
19:30 BST				Stadium: UCD Bowl

18 July 2023 Friendly	Forest Green Rovers	0–4	Coventry City	Nailsworth
19:00 BST		Report	Simms 5', 30'; Palmer 6'; Obikwu 46'	Stadium: The New Lawn; Attendance: 1,345

19 July 2023 Friendly	Forest Green Rovers	1–0	Everton U21	Nailsworth
19:00 BST	Trialist G 46'	Report		Stadium: The New Lawn; Attendance: 698; Referee: Sam Allison

22 July 2023 Friendly	Plymouth Argyle	5–1	Forest Green Rovers	Plymouth
15:00 BST	Hardie 24', 29'; Mumba 38'; Wright 48'; Whittaker 59'		Stevens 33'	Stadium: Harpers Park; Attendance: 0 (behind-closed-doors)

28 July 2023 Friendly	Forest Green Rovers	2–0	West Bromwich Albion	Nailsworth
19:00 BST	Trialist 39'; Bernard 65'			Stadium: The New Lawn

== Competitions ==
=== Overall record ===
Competition	Starting round	Final position	Record							
Competition	Starting round	Final position	Pld	W	D	L	GF	GA	GD	Win %
League Two	Matchday 1		32	5	8	19	32	60	−28	15.63
FA Cup	First round	Second round	2	1	0	1	4	5	−1	50.00
EFL Cup	First round	First round	1	0	0	1	1	3	−2	0.00
EFL Trophy	Group stage	Second round	4	1	2	1	4	2	+2	25.00
Total			39	7	10	22	41	70	−29	17.95

Last updated: 17 February 2024
Source: Soccerway

=== League Two ===
==== League table ====
Pos	Team	Pld	W	D	L	GF	GA	GD	Pts	Promotion, qualification or relegation
19	Swindon Town	46	14	12	20	77	83	−6	54	
20	Salford City	46	13	12	21	66	82	−16	51	
21	Grimsby Town	46	11	16	19	57	74	−17	49	
22	Colchester United	46	11	12	23	59	80	−21	45	
23	Sutton United (R)	46	9	15	22	59	84	−25	42	Relegated to National League
24	Forest Green Rovers (R)	46	11	9	26	44	78	−34	42	Relegated to National League

Source: EFL Official Website
Rules for classification: 1) Points; 2) Goal difference; 3) Number of goals scored; 4) Head-to-head results; 5) Wins; 6) Away goals; 7) Penalty points (sec 9.5); 8) 12-point sending off offences
(R) Relegated

==== Results summary ====
Overall								Home						Away					
Pld	W	D	L	GF	GA	GD	Pts	W	D	L	GF	GA	GD	W	D	L	GF	GA	GD
45	10	9	26	43	78	−35	39	4	4	14	18	38	−20	6	5	12	25	40	−15

Last updated: 20 April 2024.
Source: Soccerway

==== Results by round ====
Round	1	2	3	4	5	6	7	8	9	10	11	12	13	14	15	16	17	18	19	20	22	23	24	25	26	27	28	29	30	31	32	33	34	35	21	36	37	38
Ground	H	A	H	H	A	A	H	H	A	H	A	A	H	H	H	H	A	H	A	H	A	H	A	A	H	A	H	A	H	A	H	A	A	H	H	A	H	A
Result	L	W	L	L	D	W	L	L	L	L	L	L	W	P	L	W	L	D	D	L	L	D	L	L	D	D	L	D	L	D	L	W	L	W	D	L	W	W
Position	22	13	20	22	20	18	19	21	22	22	23	24	22	—	23	22	23	23	23	23	23	24	24	24	24	23	24	24	24	24	24	23	23	23	23	23	23	22

Updated to match(es) played on 24 February 2024. Source: Soccerway
A = Away; H = Home; W = Win; D = Draw; L = Loss; P = Postponed

==== Matches ====
On 22 June 2023 the EFL League Two fixtures were released.

Win Draw Loss Fixtures

5 August 2023 1	Forest Green Rovers	0–2	Salford City	Nailsworth
15:00 BST	McCann (yellow card) 43'; Robson (yellow card) 72'; Bunker (yellow card) 90'	Report	Hendry (yellow card) 17'; McAleny 52'; Garbutt (yellow card) 72'; Bolton (yellow card) 90+2'; Smith 90+5'	Stadium: The New Lawn; Attendance: 1,936; Referee: Daniel Middleton

12 August 2023 2	Harrogate Town	0–1	Forest Green Rovers	Harrogate
15:00 BST	Cornelius (yellow card) 55'	Report	Jones (yellow card) 34'; Stevens 46'; Maddox (yellow card) 62'; Bernard (yellow card) 82'	Stadium: Wetherby Road; Attendance: 2,050; Referee: Leigh Doughty

15 August 2023 3	Forest Green Rovers	1–2	Swindon Town	Nailsworth
19:45 BST	Stevens 14'; Omotoye (yellow card) 14'; Bunker (yellow card) 42' (yellow-red card) 61'; Kadji (yellow card) 70'; Bernard (yellow card) 72'; Daniels (yellow card) 88'	Report	Kinsella (yellow card) 26'; Blake-Tracy (yellow card) 45+4' (goal) 90+4'; Kemp 47'; Godwin-Malife (yellow card) 85'	Stadium: The New Lawn; Attendance: 1,868; Referee: Sunny Sukhvir Gill

19 August 2023 4	Forest Green Rovers	0–3	Newport County	Nailsworth
15:00 BST	Taylor (yellow card) 68'; Robertson (yellow card) 74' (red card) 90+1'; Deeney (yellow card) 90+1'	Report	Evans 1', 25'; Lewis 88' (pen.)	Stadium: The New Lawn; Attendance: 2,292; Referee: Scott Jackson

26 August 2023 5	AFC Wimbledon	1–1	Forest Green Rovers	Wimbledon
15:00 BST	Ball 35'; Al-Hamadi (yellow card) 38'; Davison (yellow card) 72'	Report	McCann (yellow card) 45+2'; Deeney 75'	Stadium: Plough Lane; Attendance: 6,949; Referee: Paul Howard

2 September 2023 6	Sutton United	0–1	Forest Green Rovers	Sutton
15:00 BST	Angol (yellow card) 82'	Report	Deeney (yellow card) 3'; Bunker (yellow card) 37' (goal) 63'	Stadium: Gander Green Lane; Attendance: 2,546; Referee: Scott Simpson

9 September 2023 7	Forest Green Rovers	1–4	Crewe Alexandra	Nailsworth
15:00 BST	Brown 35'; Deeney (yellow card) 46'; Robson (yellow card) 53'; Bunker (yellow card) 68'; Johnson (yellow card) 74'	Report	Tabiner (yellow card) 11'; Offord (yellow card) 18'; Long 49'; Baker-Richardson 60', 69'; O'Riordan (yellow card) 64'; Nevitt 82'	Stadium: The New Lawn; Attendance: 1,855; Referee: Thomas Parsons

16 September 2023 8	Forest Green Rovers	1–2	Doncaster Rovers	Nailsworth
15:00 BST	Brown (yellow card) 25'; Moore-Taylor (yellow card) 51' (goal) 84'; Inniss (yellow card) 71'; McCann (yellow card) 79'	Report	Biggins 35'; Olowu (yellow card) 70'; Anderson (yellow card) 90+5'; Close 90+6'	Stadium: The New Lawn; Attendance: 1,979; Referee: Jacob Miles

23 September 2023 9	Notts County	4–3	Forest Green Rovers	Nottingham
15:00 BST	Crowley 19'; Langstaff 37'; Cameron (yellow card) 43'; Bostock 65'; McGoldrick 68' (yellow card) 89'; Adebayo-Rowling (yellow card) 90+6'	Report	Brown (yellow card) 41'; Deeney 56', 61', 79' (pen.) (yellow card) 84'; Inniss (yellow card) 59'; McCann (yellow card) 60'; Lavinier (yellow card) 84'	Stadium: Meadow Lane; Attendance: 10,648; Referee: Seb Stockbridge

30 September 2023 10	Forest Green Rovers	1–2	Morecambe	Nailsworth
15:00 BST	Inniss (yellow card) 12'; Brown (yellow card) 23'; Robson (yellow card) 45+1'; Omotoye 84'	Report	Love (yellow card) 5'; Mellon 26'; Slew 48'; Bedeau (yellow card) 90+4'	Stadium: The New Lawn; Attendance: 2,290; Referee: Adam Herczeg

3 October 2023 11	Stockport County	2–0	Forest Green Rovers	Edgeley
19:45 BST	Olaofe 15'; Sarcevic 35'; Southam-Hales (yellow card) 47'	Report	Lavinier (yellow card) 39' (yellow-red card) 62'	Stadium: Edgeley Park; Attendance: 7,517; Referee: Ross Joyce

7 October 2023 12	Accrington Stanley	2–1	Forest Green Rovers	Accrington
15:00 BST	Andrews 18', 51'; Hills (yellow card) 62'	Report	Welch (yellow card) 58'; Stevens 83'	Stadium: Crown Ground; Attendance: 2,222; Referee: Ben Atkinson

14 October 2023 13	Forest Green Rovers	5–0	Colchester United	Nailsworth
15:00 BST	Morton 41'; McAllister (yellow card) 44', (goal) 65'; Taylor 77'; Stevens 79', 90+3'	Report	Mingi (yellow card) 10' (yellow-red card) 47'; McGeehan (yellow card) 45+4'	Stadium: The New Lawn; Attendance: 2,137; Referee: Ollie Yates

24 October 2023 15	Forest Green Rovers	0–2	Barrow	Nailsworth
19:45 GMT	Omotoye (yellow card) 58'; Robson (yellow card) 90+4'	Report	Foley 4'; Telford 18'; Ray (yellow card) 49'	Stadium: The New Lawn; Attendance: 1,440; Referee: Tom Reeves

28 October 2023 16	Forest Green Rovers	2–1	Crawley Town	Nailsworth
15:00 GMT	Dabo (yellow card) 4'; Morton 26', 45+2'; Maddox (yellow card) 67'; Welch (yellow card) 69'; Moore-Taylor (yellow card) 87'	Report	Darcy 6'	Stadium: The New Lawn; Attendance: 1,898; Referee: Craig Hicks

11 November 2023 17	Tranmere Rovers	3–0	Forest Green Rovers	Birkenhead
15:00 GMT	Omotoye 8' (o.g.); Dennis 47'; Hendry (yellow card) 54'; Apter 71'	Report	Bernard (yellow card) 32' (yellow-red card) 52'; Deeney (yellow card) 45+4'; Johnson (yellow card) 90+7'	Stadium: Prenton Park; Attendance: 6,461; Referee: Edward Duckworth

18 November 2023 18	Forest Green Rovers	2–2	Grimsby Town	Nailsworth
15:00 GMT	Bernard (yellow card) 6'; McAllister 37' (pen.), 44'	Report	Rose (yellow card) 5'; Holohan 65' (yellow card) 76'; Wilson 80'	Stadium: The New Lawn; Attendance: 2,580; Referee: Scott Tallis

25 November 2023 19	Walsall	0–0	Forest Green Rovers	Bescot
15:00 GMT	Maher (yellow card) 35'; McEntee (yellow card) 90+1'	Report	Deeney (yellow card) 89'; Bernard (yellow card) 90+1'; Welch (yellow card) 90+7'	Stadium: Bescot Stadium; Attendance: 6,317; Referee: Peter Wright

28 November 2023 20	Forest Green Rovers	0–3	Bradford City	Nailsworth
19:45 GMT	Deeney (yellow card) 45+3'; Moore-Taylor (yellow card) 87'	Report	Platt 9'; Cook 21' (pen.); Taylor (yellow card) 31' (red card) 90+1'; Walker 87' (yellow card) 88'	Stadium: The New Lawn; Attendance: 1,462; Referee: Simon Mather

16 December 2023 22	Milton Keynes Dons	2–0	Forest Green Rovers	Denbigh
15:00 GMT	Dean 21' (yellow card) 53'; Payne 35'; Norman (yellow card) 44'; Robson (yellow card) 57'; Harvie (yellow card) 89'	Report	Jones (yellow card) 2'; Robson (yellow card) 53'; Inniss (yellow card) 75'; Moore-Taylor (yellow card) 90'	Stadium: Stadium MK; Attendance: 6,033; Referee: Seb Stockbridge

22 December 2023 23	Forest Green Rovers	0–0	Gillingham	Nailsworth
19:00 GMT	Daniels (yellow card) 25'; Bendle (yellow card) 90+5'	Report	Nadesan (yellow card) 86'	Stadium: The New Lawn; Referee: Sam Allison

26 December 2023 24	Newport County	4–2	Forest Green Rovers	Newport
15:00 GMT	Evans (yellow card) 18', (goal) 60', 63'; Bogle (yellow card) 18'; Payne (yellow card) 50', (goal) 69'; Delaney 84'	Report	Delaney 2' (o.g.); McAllister (yellow card) 16'; Stevens 33'; Morton (yellow card) 38'; Jones (yellow card) 41' (yellow-red card) 51'; McCann (yellow card) 45'; Moore-Taylor (yellow card) 75'	Stadium: Rodney Parade; Attendance: 4,576; Referee: Stephen Martin

29 December 2023 25	Swindon Town	2–1	Forest Green Rovers	Swindon
19:45 GMT	Kemp 56', 81'; Hutton (yellow card) 71'; Minturn (yellow card) 90+8'; Young (yellow card) 90+8'	Report	Dabo (yellow card) 15'; Jenks (yellow card) 21'; Robson (yellow card) 43'; Taylor 74'; Bendle (yellow card) 80'; Inniss (yellow card) 87'; Stevens (penalty missed) 90+9'	Stadium: The County Ground; Attendance: 9,075; Referee: Scott Simpson

1 January 2024 26	Forest Green Rovers	1–1	AFC Wimbledon	Nailsworth
15:00 GMT	Stevens 4'; Jones (yellow card) 81'	Report	Al-Hamadi 12'; Biler (yellow card) 19'; Davison (yellow card) 37'	Stadium: The New Lawn; Attendance: 2,786; Referee: James Durkin

6 January 2024 27	Salford City	2–2	Forest Green Rovers	Kersal
15:00 GMT	Smith 4'; Watt (yellow card) 21'; Garbutt (yellow card) 41'; Mariappa (yellow card) 72' (yellow-red card) 90'; Watson 90+1' (pen.)	Report	Bunker (yellow card) 23'; McCann 39'; Inniss (yellow card) 59' (yellow-red card) 90'; Stevens 70'; Dabo (yellow card) 88'	Stadium: Moor Lane; Attendance: 2,355; Referee: Charles Breakspear

13 January 2024 28	Forest Green Rovers	0–2	Harrogate Town	Nailsworth
15:00 GMT	Simkin (yellow card) 31'; Rodríguez (yellow card) 41' (yellow-red card) 48'; Taylor (yellow card) 90+4'	Report	Muldoon 51' (yellow card) 56'; Odoh 69'; Falkingham (yellow card) 80'	Stadium: The New Lawn; Attendance: 1,695; Referee: Christopher Pollard

20 January 2024 29	Gillingham	1–1	Forest Green Rovers	Gillingham
15:00 GMT	Ogie (yellow card) 43'; Hutton (yellow card) 55'; Coleman (yellow card) 61'; Hawkins 67'; Ehmer (yellow card) 86'	Report	Thompson (yellow card) 55'; Jones 75'; Dabo (yellow card) 90+4'	Stadium: Priestfield Stadium; Referee: Craig Hicks

27 January 2024 30	Forest Green Rovers	0–1	Accrington Stanley	Nailsworth
15:00 GMT	Inniss (yellow card) 20'	Report	Nolan 22' (pen.); Hills (yellow card) 42'; Martin (yellow card) 45+2'; Rich-Baghuelou (yellow card) 59'; Woods (yellow card) 80'; Conneely (yellow card) 87'	Stadium: The New Lawn; Attendance: 2,238; Referee: Adam Herczeg

3 February 2024 31	Colchester United	3–3	Forest Green Rovers	Colchester
15:00 GMT	Hopper (yellow card) 9'; Smith 65'; Fevrier 67'; Anderson 70'	Report	Stevens 11' (pen.); Doidge 27'; Thompson 74'; Jones (yellow card) 83'	Stadium: Colchester Community Stadium; Attendance: 4,519; Referee: Neil Hair

10 February 2024 32	Forest Green Rovers	0–4	Mansfield Town	Nailsworth
15:00 GMT	Robson (yellow card) 16'; Thompson (yellow card) 54'	Report	Clarke 11', 90+7'; Nichols 69'; Swan 78'	Stadium: The New Lawn; Attendance: 2,240; Referee: Sunny Sukhvir Gill

13 February 2024 33	Barrow	1–2	Forest Green Rovers	Barrow-in-Furness
19:45 GMT	Stockton 29'; Campbell (yellow card) 89'	Report	McAllister 21', (yellow card) 50'; Dabo (yellow card) 41'; Osadebe 57'; McCann (yellow card) 85'	Stadium: Holker Street; Attendance: 3,029; Referee: Lewis Smith

17 February 2024 34	Crawley Town	2–0	Forest Green Rovers	Crawley
15:00 GMT	Orsi 39'; Lolos 87'	Report	Osadebe (yellow card) 68'	Stadium: Broadfield Stadium; Attendance: 2,838; Referee: Ben Speedie

24 February 2024 35	Forest Green Rovers	1–0	Tranmere Rovers	Nailsworth
15:00 GMT	Thompson (yellow card) 44'; McCann 45+1'; Inniss (yellow card) 61' (yellow-red card) 88'	Report	Davies (yellow card) 76'; Turnbull (yellow card) 77'	Stadium: The New Lawn; Attendance: 2,308; Referee: Dale Baines

27 February 2024 21	Forest Green Rovers	1–1	Wrexham	Nailsworth
19:45 GMT	Osadebe 3' (Doidge); Robson (yellow card) 90+2'		Mullin 90+3' (pen.)	Stadium: The New Lawn; Attendance: 4,412; Referee: Will Finnie
Note: Originally postponed due to a waterlogged pitch in December 2023

2 March 2024 36	Grimsby Town	1–0	Forest Green Rovers	Cleethorpes
15:00 GMT	Rodgers 8'; Green (yellow card) 90+5'	Report	Keogh (yellow card) 90+5'	Stadium: Blundell Park; Attendance: 6,506; Referee: Tom Reeves

9 March 2024 37	Forest Green Rovers	2–0	Walsall	Nailsworth
15:00 GMT	Osadebe 63'; Omotoye (yellow card) 67'; Moore-Taylor (yellow card) 72'; McAllister 81' (pen.); Thompson (yellow card) 84'	Report	Matt (yellow card) 23'; Okagbue (yellow card) 67' (yellow-red card) 72'; Hutchinson (penalty missed) 71'	Stadium: The Bolt New Lawn; Attendance: 2,883; Referee: Thomas Kirk

12 March 2024 38	Bradford City	0–2	Forest Green Rovers	Bradford
19:45 GMT	Kelly (yellow card) 90+2'	Report	Doidge 2', 90+3' (pen.); Robson (yellow card) 56'	Stadium: Valley Parade; Referee: Simon Mather

16 March 2024 39	Forest Green Rovers	0–1	Sutton United	Nailsworth
15:00 GMT	Robson (yellow card) 57'	Report	Coley 39'	Stadium: The New Lawn; Attendance: 2,664; Referee: Ben Toner

23 March 2024 40	Doncaster Rovers	2–0	Forest Green Rovers	Doncaster
15:00 GMT	Anderson (yellow card) 48'; Molyneux 62'; Ironside (yellow card) 68'; Keogh 86' (o.g.)	Report	Rodríguez (yellow card) 45+1'; Thompson (yellow card) 72'	Stadium: Eco-Power Stadium; Attendance: 7,024; Referee: Anthony Backhouse

29 March 2024 41	Forest Green Rovers	0–3	Stockport County	Nailsworth
15:00 GMT	Osadebe (yellow card) 34'; Bunker (yellow card) 76'	Report	Camps 19'; Richards 28'; Lemonheigh-Evans 51'	Stadium: The New Lawn; Attendance: 3,145; Referee: Charles Breakspear

1 April 2024 42	Crewe Alexandra	0–3	Forest Green Rovers	Crewe
15:00 BST	Nevitt (yellow card) 43'; Kirk (yellow card) 75'; Adebisi (yellow card) 76'	Report	Garrick 13', 26'; Robson 27'; Inniss (yellow card) 43'; Osadebe (yellow card) 52'; Jones (yellow card) 87'	Stadium: Gresty Road; Attendance: 5,478; Referee: Geoff Eltringham

6 April 2024 43	Forest Green Rovers	0–2	Milton Keynes Dons	Nailsworth
15:00 BST	Moore-Taylor (yellow card) 44'; McCann (yellow card) 61'	Report	Dean 40'; Gilbey 50'; Tezgel (yellow card) 90+4'	Stadium: The New Lawn; Attendance: 2,507; Referee: Andy Davies

9 April 2024 14	Mansfield Town	1–0	Forest Green Rovers	Mansfield
19:45 BST	Nichols 20', (yellow card) 77'; Lewis (yellow card) 84'; Clarke (yellow card) 90+5'	Report	Inniss (yellow card) 90+5'	Stadium: Field Mill; Attendance: 3,201; Referee: Thomas Parsons
Note: Fixture was originally scheduled for 21 October and 16 January, but was postponed due to a waterlogged pitch from Storm Babet and a frozen pitch respectively.

13 April 2024 44	Wrexham	6–0	Forest Green Rovers	Wrexham
15:00 BST	Lee 17'; Mullin 23', 44'; Inniss 33' (o.g.); Barnett 63'; Marriott 84'	Report	Osadebe (yellow card) 27'; McCann (yellow card) 62'	Stadium: Racecourse Ground; Attendance: 11,450; Referee: Sunny Singh Gill

20 April 2024 45	Morecambe	1–2	Forest Green Rovers	Morecambe
15:00 BST	Brown 30'; Rawson (yellow card) 68'	Report	Dabo (yellow card) 17'; McCann 38'; McAllister 44', (yellow card) 82'; Bernard (yellow card) 89'	Stadium: Mazuma Mobile Stadium; Attendance: 4,491; Referee: Ross Joyce

27 April 2024 46	Forest Green Rovers	1–0	Notts County	Nailsworth
15:00 BST	Osadebe (yellow card) 45'; McCann 74'	Report	Cameron (yellow card) 19'; Macari (yellow card) 70'	Stadium: The New Lawn; Attendance: 3610; Referee: Will Finnie

==== Postponed matches ====
21 October 2023 14	Mansfield Town	v	Forest Green Rovers	Mansfield
15:00 GMT		Report		Stadium: Field Mill
Note: Fixture postponed due to a waterlogged pitch and rescheduled for 16 January 2024.

16 January 2024 14	Mansfield Town	v	Forest Green Rovers	Mansfield
19:45 GMT		Report		Stadium: Field Mill
Note: Fixture rescheduled from 21 October 2023 to 16 January 2024 and postponed due to a waterlogged pitch, to be rearranged for a later date.

9 December 2023 21	Forest Green Rovers	v	Wrexham	Nailsworth
15:00 GMT		Report		Stadium: The New Lawn
Note: Fixture postponed due to a waterlogged pitch, to be rearranged for a later date.

=== FA Cup ===
Forest Green Rovers were drawn away to Scarborough Athletic in the first round. This match was played three times before a winner was confirmed by the Football Association, due to Forest Green Rovers fielding an ineligible player, under rule 109 of the FA Cup competition rules, in the original tie which ended in a 1-1 Draw. The player was on loan with Forest Green Rovers, but they had not received permission from the parent club to play him in the FA Cup. The FA ordered the match to be replayed on 6 December. This caused a knock-on effect of the second round tie against Blackpool being postponed until the original first round match had been replayed. The match against Blackpool was originally scheduled for 2 December 2023, and subsequently played on 19 December 2023

12 December 2023 First round	Scarborough Athletic	2–4	Forest Green Rovers	Scarborough
19:45 GMT	Robson 29' (o.g.); Gooda (yellow card) 56'; Colville 86'		Omotoye 34'; Morton 55'; Robertson 83' (yellow card) 90+4'; Stevens 89' (yellow card) 90+5'	Stadium: Scarborough Sports Village

19 December 2023 Second round	Blackpool	3–0	Forest Green Rovers	Blackpool
19:45 GMT	Dale 18'; Lawrence-Gabriel 75'; Ekpiteta 84'	Report	Welch (yellow card) 82'	Stadium: Bloomfield Road; Attendance: 3,188; Referee: Scott Jackson
Note: Fixture originally scheduled for 2 December 2023, but later postponed after Forest Green Rovers and Scarbrough were ordered to replay the first round replay due to Forest Green Rovers fielding an ineligible player.

==== Void matches ====
4 November 2023 First round	Scarborough Athletic	1-1; Void	Forest Green Rovers	Scarborough
15:00 GMT	Wiles 27'	Report	Sully 90+3'	Stadium: Scarborough Sports Village; Attendance: 3,209; Referee: Marc Edwards
Note: Fixture declared void due to Forest Green Rovers fielding an ineligible player, tie ordered to be replayed on 12 December 2024.

14 November 2023 First round replay	Forest Green Rovers	5-2; Void	Scarborough Athletic	Nailsworth
19:45 GMT	Jenks 5'; Dabo (yellow card) 15'; McAllister 18' (pen.); Robson 30'; Bunker 35'; Omotoye 76'	Report	Wiles 41'; Weledji (yellow card) 75'; Coulson 89'; Durose (yellow card) 90'	Stadium: The New Lawn; Attendance: 1,146; Referee: Paul Howard
Note: Fixture declared void due to Forest Green Rovers fielding an ineligible player in the match of 4 November 2023.

=== EFL Cup ===
FGR were drawn at home to Portsmouth in the first round.

Win Draw Loss Fixtures

8 August 2023 First round	Forest Green Rovers	1–3	Portsmouth	Nailsworth
19:45 BST	Robertson (yellow card) 17'; Bunker (yellow card) 23'; Omotoye 24'; Robson (yellow card) 74'	Report	Yengi (yellow card) 12' (goal) 30', 75' (pen.); Scully (yellow card) 32'; Swanson 52'; Devlin (yellow card) 58'	Stadium: The New Lawn; Attendance: 1,868; Referee: Sam Purkiss

=== EFL Trophy ===
In the group stage, Forest Green were drawn into Southern Group A along with Walsall, Shrewsbury Town and Brighton & Hove Albion U21. After topping the group, Forest Green Rovers were drawn at home to Oxford United.

Pos	Div	Team	Pld	W	PW	PL	L	GF	GA	GD	Pts	Qualification
1	L2	Forest Green Rovers	3	1	1	1	0	4	1	+3	6	Advance to Round 2
2	ACA	Brighton & Hove Albion U21	3	1	1	1	0	3	2	+1	6	Advance to Round 2
3	L1	Shrewsbury Town	3	1	1	0	1	3	5	−2	5	
4	L2	Walsall	3	0	0	1	2	5	7	−2	1	

Updated to match(es) played on 14 November 2023. Source: EFL.com

Win Draw Loss Fixtures

5 September 2023 Group stage	Forest Green Rovers	3–0	Shrewsbury Town	Nailsworth
19:00 BST	Kadji 37'; Robson (yellow card) 45+2'; Omotoye 61'; Stevens 65'; McKenzie (yellow card) 84'	Report	Bowman (penalty missed) 86'	Stadium: The New Lawn; Referee: Farai Hallam

10 October 2023 Group stage	Walsall	1–1 (2–4 p)	Forest Green Rovers	Bescot
19:00 BST	Tierney (penalty missed) 58'; Hutchinson 67'	Report	Maddox (yellow card) 29'; Welch (yellow card) 46'; Omotoye 51'; Lavinier (yellow card) 90+6'	Stadium: Bescot Stadium; Attendance: 1,516; Referee: Stephen Parkinson
	Penalties
	Stirk (penalty missed); James-Taylor (penalty scored); McEntee (penalty scored); Johnson (penalty missed)		Stevens (penalty scored); Taylor (penalty scored); Robson (penalty scored); Bunker (penalty scored)

7 November 2023 Group stage	Forest Green Rovers	0–0 (2–4 p)	Brighton & Hove Albion U21	Nailsworth
19:00 GMT	Robertson (yellow card) 60'; Sully (yellow card) 62'; McCann (yellow card) 66'	Report	Flower (yellow card) 80'	Stadium: The New Lawn; Attendance: 750; Referee: David Rock
	Penalties
	Bunker (penalty scored); Omotoye (penalty scored); Robson (penalty missed); Welch (penalty missed)		O'Mahony (penalty scored); Hinchy (penalty scored); Chouchane (penalty scored); Mullins (penalty scored)

5 December 2023 Second round	Forest Green Rovers	0–1	Oxford United	Nailsworth
19:00 GMT	Inniss (yellow card) 13'; Omotoye (yellow card) 39'	Report	Goodrham 49'; Rodríguez (yellow card) 53'; Negru (yellow card) 82'	Stadium: The New Lawn; Attendance: 494; Referee: Ollie Yates
