= Sean Robertson =

English footballer (born 2001)

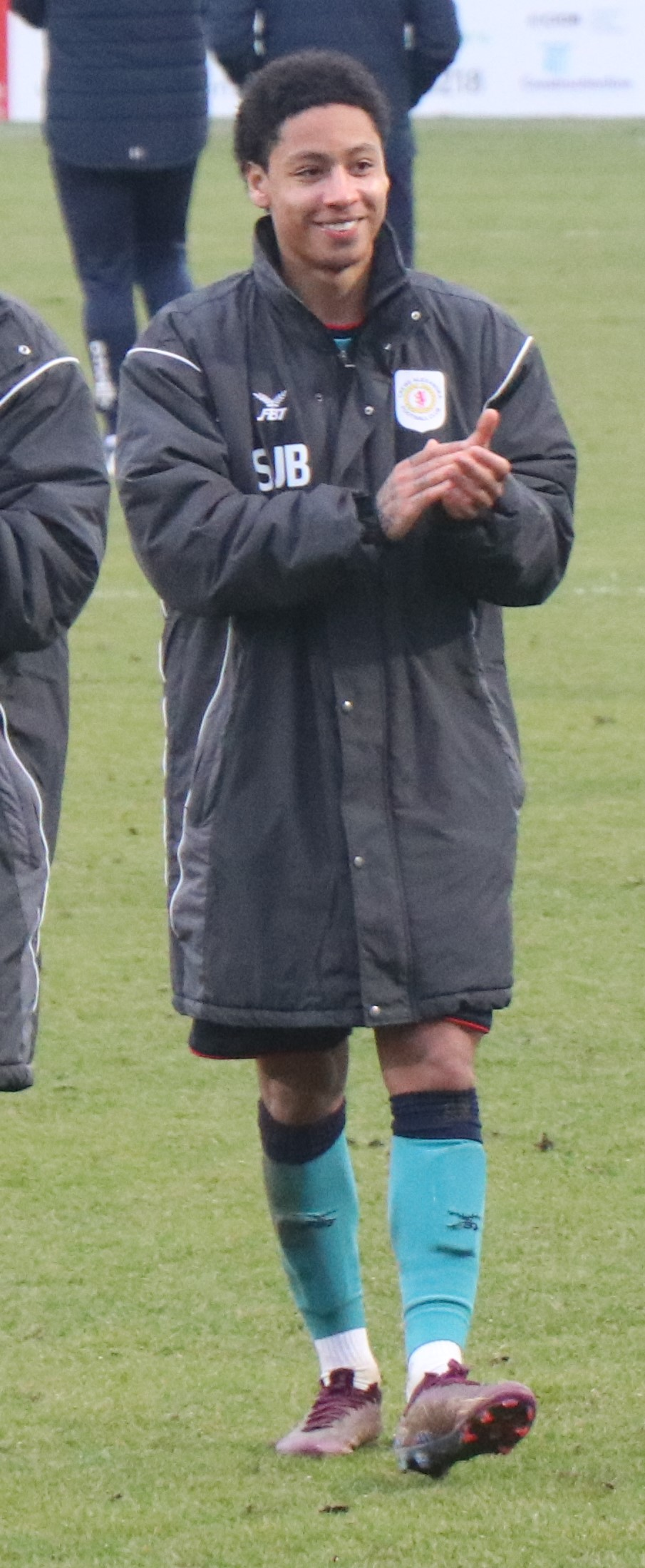
- Robertson with Crewe Alexandra in 2023

Personal information
- Full name: Sean Dominic Robertson
- Date of birth: 6 June 2001 (age 25)
- Place of birth: Wandsworth, England
- Position: Midfielder

Team information
- Current team: Cliftonville
- Number: 23

Youth career
- 2011–2022: Crystal Palace

Senior career*
Years	Team	Apps	(Gls)
2022–2024	Forest Green Rovers	15	(0)
2023	→ Crewe Alexandra (loan)	10	(0)
2024–2025	Derry City	7	(0)
2025	Shamrock Rovers	1	(0)
2025–	Cliftonville	14	(1)
- * Club domestic league appearances and goals as of 29 April 2026

Sean Dominic Robertson (born 6 June 2001) is a professional footballer who plays as a midfielder NIFL Premiership club Cliftonville.

== Career ==
Robertson started his career in the Academy at Crystal Palace, and had trials with Sheffield United and Derby County.

=== Forest Green Rovers ===
In August 2022, he signed for Forest Green Rovers, with head coach Ian Burchnall noting the youngster's versatility. He made his professional debut on 6 August 2022, coming on as a 61st-minute substitute for Kyle McAllister in a 2–1 defeat to Ipswich Town at The New Lawn, before joining Crewe Alexandra on loan in January 2023 until the end of the season. Robertson was sent off in his third Crewe appearance, in a 2–2 draw at Crawley Town on 11 February 2023.

Following back-to-back relegations, Robertson was released at the end of the 2023–24 season.

=== Derry City ===
On 23 August 2024, Robertson signed for League of Ireland Premier Division club Derry City.

=== Shamrock Rovers ===
On 1 March 2025, he departed Derry to sign for Shamrock Rovers. He was released by Rovers in June 2025 after making just one substitute appearance for the club.

== Style of play ==
Robertson can play as a wing-back, as a winger, or as part of a front three.

== Career statistics ==
As of match played on 14 March 2025

Appearances and goals by club, season and competition
Club	Season	League			National Cup		League Cup		Other		Total	
Club	Season	Division	Apps	Goals	Apps	Goals	Apps	Goals	Apps	Goals	Apps	Goals
Crystal Palace U21	2021–22	—			—		—		2 (Note: Appearances in EFL Trophy)	0	2	0
Forest Green Rovers	2022–23	EFL League One	3	0	0	0	2	0	3	0	8	0
Forest Green Rovers	2023–24	League Two	12	0	1	1	1	0	3	0	17	1
Forest Green Rovers	Total		15	0	1	1	3	0	6	0	25	1
Crewe Alexandra (loan)	2022–23	League Two	10	0	0	0	0	0	0	0	10	0
Derry City	2024	LOI Premier Division	7	1	1	0	—		—		8	1
Derry City	2025	LOI Premier Division	0	0	—		—		—		0	0
Derry City	Total		7	1	1	0	—		—		8	1
Shamrock Rovers	2025	LOI Premier Division	1	0	—		—		—		1	0
Career total			33	1	2	1	3	0	6	0	44	2
