= Callum Jones (footballer, born 2001) =

Footballer (born 2001)

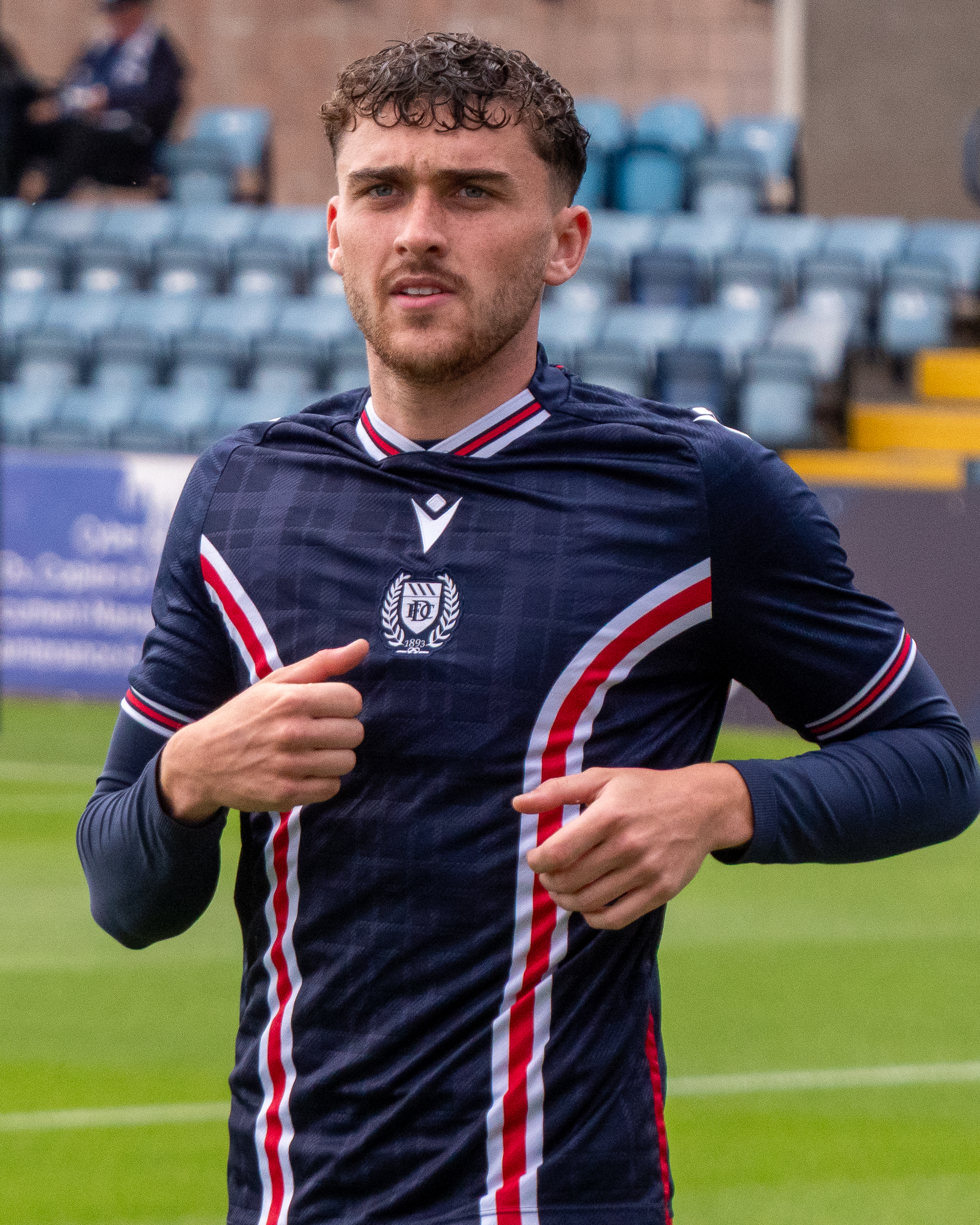
- Jones warming up for Dundee in 2025

Personal information
- Full name: Callum Graham Jones
- Date of birth: 5 April 2001 (age 25)
- Place of birth: Wirral, England
- Height: 5 ft 9 in (1.75 m)
- Position: Midfielder

Team information
- Current team: Dundee
- Number: 28

Youth career
- 2010–2017: Tranmere Rovers
- 2017–2018: The New Saints
- 2018: Oswestry Town
- 2018–2019: Bury

Senior career*
Years	Team	Apps	(Gls)
2019–2025	Hull City	4	(0)
2021–2022	→ Morecambe (loan)	11	(1)
2022	→ Grimsby Town (loan)	3	(0)
2023–2024	→ Forest Green Rovers (loan)	26	(1)
2024–2025	→ Morecambe (loan)	34	(1)
2025–	Dundee	34	(2)

International career
2018	Wales U18	1	(0)
- * Club domestic league appearances and goals as of 22:02, 21 November 2026 (UTC)

Callum Graham Jones (born 5 April 2001) is a professional footballer who plays as a midfielder for Scottish Premiership club Dundee. He is a former Wales under-18 international.

== Early career ==
Jones is a youth product of Tranmere Rovers, The New Saints, Oswestry Town, and Bury.

== Club career ==
=== Hull City ===
On 17 October 2019, Jones signed a professional contract with Hull City for one year. Jones made his professional debut with Hull in a 2–1 EFL Trophy defeat to Leicester City U21s on 8 September 2020. He scored his first goal for the club, also in the EFL Trophy, in a 2–0 win over Harrogate Town on 10 November 2020, where he was also captain. On 6 January 2021, Jones signed a new two-and-a-half-year contract with Hull City. On 27 January 2023, Jones signed a new two-and-a-half-year contract with Hull City.

==== Morecambe (loan) ====
On 16 June 2021, Jones signed a season long loan deal with Morecambe. On 18 January 2022, Jones was recalled by Hull City.

==== Grimsby Town (loan) ====
On 5 March 2022, Jones signed a month-long loan deal with Grimsby Town. He made his debut the same day in a 1–0 victory at Blundell Park.

On 20 March 2022, following an injury which would rule him out for the rest of the season, Jones returned to Hull City.

==== Forest Green Rovers (loan) ====
On 30 June 2023, Jones signed for recently relegated League Two club Forest Green Rovers on a season-long loan deal.

==== Morecambe (loan) ====
On 12 July 2024, Jones joined Morecambe on a season-long loan. On 17 May 2025, Hull City confirmed that Jones would depart the club after the expiration of his contract.

=== Dundee ===
On 15 July 2025, Jones joined Scottish Premiership club Dundee on a two-year deal. Jones made his debut on 22 July 2025, in an away League Cup victory against Bonnyrigg Rose. On 20 September, Jones scored his first goal for the Dee, coming on as a substitute and scoring a stoppage time penalty to give Dundee their first league win of the season at home to Livingston.

== International career ==
Born in England, Jones is of Welsh descent through a grandmother. He is a youth international for Wales, having first represented the Wales U18s in 2018.

== Career statistics ==
As of 21 November 2026

Appearances and goals by club, season and competition
Club	Season	League			National cup		League cup		Other		Total	
Club	Season	Division	Apps	Goals	Apps	Goals	Apps	Goals	Apps	Goals	Apps	Goals
Hull City	2020–21	League One	1	0	1	0	2	0	3 (Note: Appearances in the EFL Trophy)	1	7	1
Hull City	2021–22	Championship	2	0	0	0	0	0	0	0	2	0
Hull City	2022–23	Championship	1	0	1	0	0	0	0	0	2	0
Hull City	2023–24	Championship	0	0	0	0	0	0	0	0	0	0
Hull City	2024–25	Championship	0	0	0	0	0	0	0	0	0	0
Hull City	Total		4	0	2	0	2	0	3	1	11	1
Morecambe (loan)	2021–22	League One	11	1	3	0	1	0	3	1	18	2
Grimsby Town (loan)	2021–22	National League	3	0	0	0	0	0	0	0	3	0
Forest Green Rovers (loan)	2023–24	League Two	26	1	2	0	1	0	1	0	30	1
Morecambe (loan)	2024–25	League Two	34	1	2	0	1	0	3	0	40	1
Dundee	2025–26	Scottish Premiership	27	1	2	0	2	0	0	0	31	1
Dundee	2026–27	Scottish Premiership	7	1	0	0	2	0	0	0	9	1
Dundee	Total		34	2	2	0	4	0	0	0	40	2
Career total			112	5	11	0	9	0	10	2	142	7
