= Darnell Johnson =

English footballer

Personal information
- Full name: Darnell Tobias Jack Johnson
- Date of birth: 3 September 1998 (age 28)
- Place of birth: Leicester, England
- Height: 6 ft 1 in (1.85 m)
- Position: Defender

Team information
- Current team: Oxford City
- Number: 6

Youth career
- Leicester City

Senior career*
Years	Team	Apps	(Gls)
2018–2021	Leicester City	0	(0)
2019	→ Hibernian (loan)	1	(0)
2020–2021	→ Wigan Athletic (loan)	10	(0)
2021	→ AFC Wimbledon (loan)	11	(0)
2021–2023	Fleetwood Town	3	(1)
2023–2024	Forest Green Rovers	9	(0)
2025–	Oxford City	1	(0)

International career^{‡}
2013–2014	England U16	2	(0)
2014	England U17	7	(0)
2015	England U18	2	(0)
2016–2017	England U19	6	(0)
2017–2018	England U20	4	(2)
- * Club domestic league appearances and goals as of 14:09, 30 April 2024 (UTC) ‡ National team caps and goals as of 20:39, 25 January 2021 (UTC)

Darnell Tobias Jack Johnson (born 3 September 1998) is an English professional footballer who plays as a defender for Oxford City.

== Club career ==
After featuring in friendly games ahead of the 2018–19 season, he signed a three-year contract with Leicester City in August 2018. He moved on loan to Scottish Premiership club Hibernian on 31 January 2019, for the rest of the 2018–19 season. Johnson made his first appearance for Hibernian in a 2–0 defeat against Celtic on 6 February. He was subsequently suspended for two matches for a challenge he made on Emilio Izaguirre during that match.

On 28 September 2020 he went to Wigan Athletic on loan until 4 January 2021.

After the end of his loan spell at Wigan, he went on loan to AFC Wimbledon from 25 January 2021 until the end of the season

In June 2021, it was announced that Johnson would be released from Leicester City upon expiry of his contract at the end of the season.

On 2 August 2021, Johnson signed for EFL League One club Fleetwood Town on a two-year contract. He was released from the club following the 2022–23 season.

On 4 August 2023, Johnson signed for Forest Green Rovers after impressing on a trial. He was released following relegation at the end of the 2023–24 season.

Johnson signed for National League North side Oxford City in July 2025. He made his debut on 8 August 2025, against AFC Fylde.

== International career ==
In November 2013, Johnson was captain of the England under-16 team against Northern Ireland in the Victory Shield. Johnson was part of the England under-19 team that won the 2017 UEFA European Under-19 Championship, playing the full game against Portugal in the final.

In August 2017, Johnson scored for the England under-20 team against the Netherlands.

== Personal life ==
Johnson is the godson of former Leicester City and England player Emile Heskey.

== Career statistics ==
As of end of 2023–24 season

Appearances and goals by club, season and competition
Club	Season	League			National Cup		League Cup		Other		Total	
Club	Season	Division	Apps	Goals	Apps	Goals	Apps	Goals	Apps	Goals	Apps	Goals
Leicester City U21s	2016–17 EFL Trophy		—		—		—		1 (Note: Appearances in the EFL Trophy)	0	1	0
Leicester City U21s	2017–18 EFL Trophy		—		—		—		1	0	1	0
Leicester City U21s	2018–19 EFL Trophy		—		—		—		3	0	3	0
Leicester City U21s	2019–20 EFL Trophy		—		—		—		6	0	6	0
Leicester City U21s	Total		—		—		—		11	0	11	0
Leicester City	2017–18	Premier League	0	0	0	0	0	0	0	0	0	0
Leicester City	2018–19	Premier League	0	0	0	0	0	0	0	0	0	0
Leicester City	2019–20	Premier League	0	0	0	0	0	0	0	0	0	0
Leicester City	2020–21	Premier League	0	0	0	0	0	0	0	0	0	0
Leicester City	Total		0	0	0	0	0	0	0	0	0	0
Hibernian (loan)	2018–19	Scottish Premiership	1	0	0	0	0	0	0	0	1	0
Wigan Athletic (loan)	2020–21	League One	10	0	0	0	0	0	1	0	11	0
A.F.C. Wimbledon (loan)	2020–21	League One	11	0	0	0	0	0	0	0	11	0
Fleetwood Town	2021–22	League One	3	1	0	0	0	0	1	0	4	1
Forest Green Rovers	2023–24	League Two	9	0	2	0	1	0	2	0	14	0
Career total			34	1	2	0	1	0	15	0	51	1

== Honours ==
England U19

- UEFA European Under-19 Championship: 2017
