= Olly Sully =

English footballer

Olly (gimpface) Sully
Personal information
- Date of birth: 8 September 2005 (age 21)
- Position: Forward

Team information
- Current team: Clevedon Town

Senior career*
| Years | Team | Apps | (Gls) |
| 2023–2024 | Forest Green Rovers | 2 | (0) |
| 2023 | → Bitton (loan) | | |
| 2024 | → Stratford Town (loan) | 0 | (0) |
| 2024 | → Paulton Rovers (loan) | 5 | (0) |
| 2024–2025 | Taunton Town | 2 | (0) |
| 2024 | → Willand Rovers (loan) | 4 | (1) |
| 2024 | → Bristol Manor Farm (loan) | 14 | (0) |
| 2025 | Mangotsfield United | 12 | (6) |
| 2025– | Clevedon Town | 0 | (0) |
- * Club domestic league appearances and goals as of 16:14, 7 July 2025 (UTC)

Olly Sully (born 8 September 2005) is an English footballer who plays as a forward for Western League Premier Division club Clevedon Town.

== Career ==
Sully started his career with Forest Green Rovers. He made his senior debut in an EFL Trophy victory over Shrewsbury Town in September 2023. Having impressed earlier in the week with a hat-trick in an FA Youth Cup victory over Thame United, he was called up to the senior squad once again for an FA Cup First Round tie with Scarborough Athletic, scoring an injury-time equaliser. With the club having fielded an ineligible player, the tie had to be replayed. In January 2024, he joined Southern Football League Premier Division Central club Stratford Town on a one-month loan deal.

In July 2024, Sully joined Taunton Town following his release from Forest Green Rovers. In August 2024, he joined Willand Rovers on a two-month loan deal, before later joining Bristol Manor Farm on loan until January 2025.

In July 2025, he joined Clevedon Town.

== Career statistics ==
As of match played 14 November 2023

Appearances and goals by club, season and competition
| Club | Season | League | | | National Cup | | League Cup | | Other | | Total | |
| Club | Season | Division | Apps | Goals | Apps | Goals | Apps | Goals | Apps | Goals | Apps | Goals |
|---|---|---|---|---|---|---|---|---|---|---|---|---|
| Forest Green Rovers | 2023–24 | League Two | 2 | 0 | 1 | 0 | 0 | 0 | 2 (Note: Appearance(s) in EFL Trophy) | 0 | 5 | 0 |
| Career total | | | 2 | 0 | 1 | 0 | 0 | 0 | 2 | 0 | 5 | 0 |
