= Dom Bernard =

Footballer (born 1997)

Personal information
- Full name: Dominic Archie Bernard
- Date of birth: 29 March 1997 (age 29)
- Place of birth: Gloucester, England
- Height: 1.80 m (5 ft 11 in)
- Position: Defender

Team information
- Current team: Weston-super-Mare
- Number: 3

Youth career
- Tredworth Tigers
- 2009–2018: Birmingham City

Senior career*
Years	Team	Apps	(Gls)
2018–2019	Birmingham City	0	(0)
2018–2019	→ Aldershot Town (loan)	35	(0)
2019–2024	Forest Green Rovers	158	(1)
2024–2025	Yeovil Town	31	(2)
2025–	Weston-super-Mare	25	(0)

International career
2013	Republic of Ireland U17	2	(0)
2015	Republic of Ireland U18	1	(0)
- * Club domestic league appearances and goals as of 18:50, 2 May 2026 (UTC)

Dominic Archie Bernard (born 29 March 1997) is a professional footballer who plays as a defender for National League South club Weston-super-Mare.

Bernard began his football career with Birmingham City. He made his senior debut while on loan to Aldershot Town of the National League in 2018–19, and was released at the end of that season without having played senior football for Birmingham. He signed for Forest Green Rovers in July 2019, and left the club after their relegation from the Football League in 2024.

Bernard was born in Gloucester, England, and has represented the Republic of Ireland internationally at under-17 and under-18 levels.

== Club career ==
=== Early life and club career ===
Bernard was born in Gloucester. and attended Upton St Leonards primary school. He represented Gloucestershire Schools at football at primary school level, as well as playing for local team Tredworth Tigers, before joining Birmingham's Academy at the age of 12. He took up a scholarship with the club in July 2013. By 2014–15 pre-season, he was captain of the under-18 team.

=== Birmingham City ===
Bernard played in the Birmingham team, a mixture of first-team and reserve players, that won the 2014–15 Birmingham Senior Cup, and signed his first professional contract, of two years, a few days later. According to coach Steve Spooner, "Dom is your thinking man's footballer. He is very calm and composed on the ball and seldom goes to ground. He sees things quickly and his reading of the game is excellent." He was a member of the Birmingham reserve team that lost the 2016 Birmingham Senior Cup final to National League North champions Solihull Moors. He was one of three youngsters – the others were Josh Dacres-Cogley and Wes Harding – who began their pre-season training with the first team, but suffered an Achilles injury that kept him out for most of the 2016–17 season.

The club took up the one-year option on Bernard's contract for the 2017–18 season, and offered him a further year for 2018–19. Initially a member of the U23 squad for pre-season training in Austria, Bernard was called into the senior party, and on their return to England, he played in several first-team friendlies. He then joined Aldershot Town of the National League on a six-month loan. He became a regular in the side, and his loan was extended to the end of the season. He won the club's Player of the Month award for January 2019, and finished the season with 37 appearances in all competitions.

In March 2019, Birmingham confirmed that Bernard would be released when his contract expired at the end of the season.

=== Forest Green Rovers ===
After taking part in pre-season training with Forest Green Rovers, Bernard signed a one-year contract with the League Two club on 17 July 2019. He made his debut on the opening day of the 2019–20 season, in the starting eleven for the match at home to Oldham Athletic. He soon established himself as a regular in the team, playing on the right of the defence in a variety of formations, and in early November, his contract was extended to run until 2021.

Following the second of back-to-back relegations, Bernard was released at the end of the 2023–24 season.

=== Yeovil Town ===
Bernard signed a one-year contract with National League club Yeovil Town on 6 September 2024. He made his debut the following day away to AFC Fylde. Yeovil came back from 2–0 down to lead 3–2, but Fylde equalised in the 84th minute; three minutes later, Bernard scored what proved to be the winner.

=== Weston-super-Mare ===
On 16 November 2025, Bernard joined National League South club Weston-super-Mare.

== International career ==
Bernard was first called up to the Republic of Ireland under-17 squad for two friendly matches against Slovakia in September 2013. He started the first and came on for the last few minutes of the second, both of which were defeats. He played for the under-18s once in June 2015, but was injured when under consideration for the under-19s a few months later.

== Career statistics ==
As of match played 2 May 2026

Appearances and goals by club, season and competition
Club	Season	League			FA Cup		EFL Cup		Other		Total	
Club	Season	Division	Apps	Goals	Apps	Goals	Apps	Goals	Apps	Goals	Apps	Goals
Birmingham City	2018–19	Championship	0	0	0	0	0	0	—		0	0
Aldershot Town (loan)	2018–19	National League	35	0	1	0	—		1 (Note: Appearance(s) in FA Trophy)	0	37	0
Forest Green Rovers	2019–20	League Two	28	0	3	0	2	0	1 (Note: Appearance(s) in EFL Trophy)	0	34	0
Forest Green Rovers	2020–21	League Two	25	0	0	0	0	0	5 (Note: Three appearances in EFL Trophy, two in EFL League Two play-offs)	0	30	0
Forest Green Rovers	2021–22	League Two	34	1	0	0	2	0	3	0	39	1
Forest Green Rovers	2022–23	League One	34	0	3	0	2	0	3	1	42	1
Forest Green Rovers	2023–24	League Two	37	0	0	0	1	0	3	0	41	0
Forest Green Rovers	Total		158	1	6	0	7	0	15	1	186	2
Yeovil Town	2024–25	National League	31	2	1	0	—		0	0	32	2
Weston-super-Mare	2025–26	National League South	25	0	2	0	—		3 (Note: One appearance in FA Trophy, two appearances in National League South play-offs)	0	30	0
Career total			249	3	10	0	7	0	19	1	285	4

== Honours ==
Forest Green Rovers

- EFL League Two: 2021–22
