= Ryan Inniss =

English footballer

Personal information
- Full name: Ryan Stuart Clayton Inniss
- Date of birth: 5 June 1995 (age 31)
- Place of birth: Penge, England
- Height: 6 ft 6 in (1.97 m)
- Position: Centre back

Team information
- Current team: Hornchurch
- Number: 3

Youth career
- 2008–2013: Crystal Palace

Senior career*
Years	Team	Apps	(Gls)
2013–2020	Crystal Palace	0	(0)
2013	→ Cheltenham Town (loan)	2	(0)
2014	→ Luton Town (loan)	1	(0)
2014	→ Gillingham (loan)	3	(0)
2014–2015	→ Yeovil Town (loan)	6	(0)
2015	→ Port Vale (loan)	5	(0)
2015–2016	→ Port Vale (loan)	15	(0)
2016–2017	→ Southend United (loan)	10	(0)
2017–2018	→ Colchester United (loan)	18	(0)
2018–2019	→ Dundee (loan)	11	(0)
2019–2020	→ Newport County (loan)	22	(1)
2020–2023	Charlton Athletic	64	(4)
2023–2026	Forest Green Rovers	96	(6)
2026–	Hornchurch	0	(0)

International career
2011	England U16	5	(1)
2011–2012	England U17	8	(0)
- * Club domestic league appearances and goals as of 20:49, 26 April 2026 (UTC)

Ryan Stuart Clayton Inniss (born 5 June 1995) is an English professional footballer who plays as a centre back for National League club Hornchurch.

An England under-16 and under-17 international, he turned professional at Crystal Palace in 2011. He had a number of loan spells at Cheltenham Town, Luton Town, Gillingham, Yeovil Town, Port Vale, Southend United, Colchester United, Dundee and Newport County. He joined Charlton Athletic on a free transfer in October 2020, where he would make 72 appearances in close to three seasons. He signed with Forest Green Rovers in June 2023, staying with the club for three seasons. He joined Hornchurch in July 2026.

== Club career ==
=== Crystal Palace ===
Inniss joined the Crystal Palace youth academy at the age of 14 and signed his first professional contract two years later. He captained the club's youth team during the 2012–13 season.

==== Cheltenham Town loan ====
Inniss joined League Two side Cheltenham Town on 1 August 2013 on a month-long loan; this was later extended for a further month. "Robins" manager Mark Yates said that Inniss had "been on our radar for six months now". Standing in for the injured Troy Brown, Inniss made his professional debut on 27 August 2013 in Cheltenham's 2–1 League Cup defeat against West Ham United. He impressed despite suffering a facial injury. He made his first appearance in the English Football League four days later against Bury. On 13 September 2013, Inniss had his loan spell at Cheltenham terminated due to injury. After recovering, he was an unused substitute for Crystal Palace in a 3–1 loss to Liverpool in the Premier League on 5 October 2013.

==== Luton Town loan ====
On 10 January 2014, Inniss joined Conference Premier leaders Luton Town on a one-month loan, having been a "number one target" for "Hatters" manager John Still. He scored with his first touch five minutes into his Luton debut in a 2–2 FA Trophy draw with Cambridge United. He returned to Crystal Palace after playing in three matches for the club. On 14 February 2014, he joined League One side Gillingham on a loan deal lasting until the end of the season, making his debut against Sheffield United in a 1–0 defeat. He picked up an injury in the game, which limited him to just two further appearances for the "Gills".

==== Yeovil Town loan ====
On 16 October 2014, Inniss joined Yeovil Town on a one-month loan deal, later extended until 20 December 2014. "Glovers" manager Gary Johnson had signed him on the recommendation of Tony Pulis. On 29 November, he was sent off for the first time in his career for a two-footed challenge on Kyel Reid in a 2–0 defeat by Preston North End at Huish Park. On 6 January 2015, Inniss returned to Crystal Palace after being recalled from his loan spell at Yeovil having made six appearances.

==== Port Vale loan ====
On 12 February 2015, Inniss joined Port Vale on a one-month loan deal. He made his debut two days later, helping the "Valiants" to keep their first clean sheet in three months with a 1–0 win over Walsall. He collected five yellow cards in five starts during his stay at Vale Park, helping the team to concede just two goals whilst he was on the pitch, but his loan spell was not extended as he damaged his ankle ligaments during his final appearance.

After being linked with a return to Burslem for many weeks, his arrival on loan at Port Vale for the entirety of the 2015–16 season was confirmed on 27 July. He started the 2015–16 season competing with Remie Streete and Richard Duffy for one of two available centre-back places. He was in good form at the start of the campaign, and also managed to significantly improve his disciplinary record. He dislocated his shoulder in September and returned to Selhurst Park for treatment, though his loan deal to Port Vale remained active. He returned to Vale shortly after Christmas. However, he picked up a hamstring injury in a home draw with Coventry City on 7 February, and was ruled out of action for three weeks. He returned to Crystal Palace after a re-occurrence of his hamstring injury in a defeat to Barnsley on 28 March. Page described him as "the unluckiest player I think I have ever met with injuries".

==== Southend United loan ====
On 31 August 2016, he joined League One side Southend United on loan for the rest of the 2016–17 season. He had a difficult start to the campaign, and after returning to Southend following his release from prison he went on to dislocate his shoulder in an FA Cup defeat to Millwall, and was ruled out of action for three months following surgery. On 25 February, he was sent off for two yellow card offences in a 2–1 loss at Gillingham, though manager Phil Brown strongly criticised the decision and said it was "unbelievable refereeing". On 4 April, he dislocated his shoulder for the second time of the season in a 1–0 defeat to Bolton Wanderers at Roots Hall.

==== Colchester United loan ====
On 31 August 2017, he joined League Two side Colchester United on loan for the rest of the 2017–18 season. He made his Colchester debut in a 3–1 win over Crawley Town at the Colchester Community Stadium on 9 September. He made 19 appearances for John McGreal's "U's" across the 2017–18 season and was named in the EFL team of the week for his performance in a 1–0 win at Barnet on 11 November.

==== Crystal Palace debut and Dundee loan ====
Inniss made his Crystal Palace debut on 28 August 2018, playing in the entirety of the club's 1–0 win at Swansea City in the EFL Cup. He admitted his "surprise" at finally making his senior debut for the club and said "I can only thank those people at the club who have helped me off the field through some tough times". However, manager Roy Hodgson did not name him in his 25-man Premier League squad, and three days later he joined Scottish Premiership side Dundee on loan until the end of the 2018–19 season. He started the season in the "Dens" starting eleven but fell out of the first-team picture after Jim McIntyre replaced Neil McCann as the manager in October. He did manage to force his way back into the team in January, alongside Genséric Kusunga, after Darren O'Dea was suspended and Andrew Davies picked up an injury. However, his loan at Dens Park was ended early on 31 January, with Inniss returning to Palace having played 13 games for Dundee.

==== Newport County loan ====
On 23 August 2019, Inniss joined League Two side Newport County on loan until the end of the 2019–20 season. On 31 August, he was praised for his debut for Newport, being named in the starting line up and playing a positive role in the 2–0 League Two win against Forest Green Rovers. His second appearance for Newport was as a 59th-minute substitute in the EFL Trophy 5–4 defeat against West Ham United U21s on 4 September, in which he was sent off for allegedly biting 18-year-old Reece Hannam. This was the second red received by Inniss during his career. Newport manager Michael Flynn stated after the match that if the accusation was true, it was "inexcusable and I will not be fighting his corner". On 6 September, Inniss was charged with violent conduct by the FA. Inniss was available and played in Newport's next League Two fixture the following day, a 1–0 win against Port Vale. He was subsequently suspended for five matches. He scored his first goal for Newport in a 2–1 win over Bradford City at Rodney Parade on 22 February; he was also named on the EFL team of the week. However, he received his second red card of the season for a two-footed challenge on Joshua Kayode in a 2–0 defeat at Carlisle United on 10 March.

=== Charlton Athletic ===
On 13 October 2020, Inniss joined League One club Charlton Athletic on a two-year deal; "Addicks" chairman Thomas Sandgaard said that "Ryan is a player that [director of football] Steve Gallen has been following for a very long time and he fits in with what [manager] Lee [Bowyer] and Steve are trying to do". He was sent off for receiving two yellow cards in a 2–0 win over Oxford United at The Valley on 27 October. The following month he injured a quad muscle in training and was sidelined for the next five months. Speaking in April, new manager Nigel Adkins said that the defender's long-standing injury record would be addressed. Inniss scored his first goal for the club on 4 May, in a 3–1 win against Lincoln City.

A thigh issue caused him to be sidelined from late August until Christmas in 2021. On 5 April 2022, he was shown a straight red card for a reckless challenge on AFC Wimbledon midfielder George Marsh just seven minutes after entering the game as a substitute. Manager Johnnie Jackson said that Inniss had made "a bad mistake" but stressed that it would not effect the decision whether or not to extend his contract in the summer. Later that month he was recognised for his charity work as League One's 2022 PFA Player in the Community. Despite featuring just 17 times in the 2021–22 campaign, his contract was extended by a further year. He made 38 starts and three substitute appearances in the 2022–23 season, receiving four red cards, though one was rescinded on appeal; his disciplinary record meant that he was suspended for a total of five games following his third non-rescinded red card. On 13 May 2023, it was announced that Inniss would leave the club when his contract expired in June.

=== Forest Green Rovers ===
On 16 June 2023, Inniss joined recently-relegated League Two club Forest Green Rovers, where manager Duncan Ferguson said "he's the type of player and profile I feel we need". Inniss suffered a suffered a stress fracture in October and was sidelined for 12 weeks. On 6 January, he was sent off after giving away a stoppage-time penalty in a 2–2 draw at Salford City. On 24 February, he was sent off for a late foul on Connor Jennings in a 1–0 win over Tranmere Rovers at The New Lawn. He played 38 games in the 2023–24 campaign despite injury and suspensions as the club were relegated back into non-League football.

Rovers were top of the National League when Inniss was sent off against Woking on 26 October, which ended in a 1–1 draw and saw them drop to second place. He was named as the club's Player of the Month for January after scoring two goals and providing one assist. He scored six goals in 47 appearances during the 2024–25 campaign, including the opening goal of the play-off semi-final defeat to Southend United.

He scored a winning goal over Altrincham in September 2025. However, Inniss pulled a calf muscle in December 2025 and was ruled out of action for six weeks. He struggled to regain his place in the team under manager Robbie Savage after recovering from the injury and left the club upon the expiry of his contract at the end of the 2025–26 season.

=== Hornchurch ===
On 9 July 2026, Inniss joined newly promoted National League club Hornchurch.

== International career ==
Inniss has represented England at under-16 and under-17 level, scoring the winning goal in England U16's 2–1 Victory Shield win over Scotland U16 in 2011. He is also eligible to represent Trinidad and Tobago at international level, through his Trinidadian-born father. He was called up by head coach Dwight Yorke in November 2025.

== Style of play ==
A vocal player, Cheltenham Town centre-back partner Steve Elliott described him as "a typical modern-day centre-half: tall, athletic and aggressive". He has struggled with various injuries throughout his career.

== Personal life ==
Inniss had a troubled childhood, as his mother's drug dependency and his father's imprisonment left him to raise his two younger siblings as a teenager. He has three police cautions: one for a public order offence in 2011, one for common assault in August 2015 and one for being drunk and disorderly and resisting a police constable in March 2015. On 9 September 2016, Inniss pleaded guilty to assault following an incident in a bar four months earlier; he was sentenced to 14 weeks in prison. He was released three days later after successfully appealing his sentence, which was suspended for 18 months; he was also handed 240 hours unpaid work, a £300 fine, and ordered to take part in a 20-day alcohol rehabilitation course.

== Career statistics ==
As of match played 14 March 2026

Appearances and goals by club, season and competition
Club	Season	League			FA Cup		League Cup		Other		Total	
Club	Season	Division	Apps	Goals	Apps	Goals	Apps	Goals	Apps	Goals	Apps	Goals
Crystal Palace	2013–14	Premier League	0	0	0	0	0	0	—		0	0
Crystal Palace	2014–15	Premier League	0	0	0	0	0	0	—		0	0
Crystal Palace	2015–16	Premier League	0	0	0	0	0	0	—		0	0
Crystal Palace	2016–17	Premier League	0	0	0	0	0	0	—		0	0
Crystal Palace	2017–18	Premier League	0	0	0	0	0	0	—		0	0
Crystal Palace	2018–19	Premier League	0	0	0	0	1	0	—		1	0
Crystal Palace	2019–20	Premier League	0	0	0	0	0	0	—		0	0
Crystal Palace	2020–21	Premier League	0	0	0	0	1	0	—		1	0
Crystal Palace	Total		0	0	0	0	2	0	0	0	2	0
Cheltenham Town (loan)	2013–14	League Two	2	0	0	0	1	0	1 (Note: Appearance in the Football League Trophy / EFL Trophy)	0	4	0
Luton Town (loan)	2013–14	Conference Premier	1	0	0	0	—		2 (Note: Appearances in the FA Trophy)	1	3	1
Gillingham (loan)	2013–14	League One	3	0	—		—		—		3	0
Yeovil Town (loan)	2014–15	League One	6	0	0	0	—		—		6	0
Port Vale (loan)	2014–15	League One	5	0	—		—		—		5	0
Port Vale (loan)	2015–16	League One	15	0	0	0	2	0	0	0	17	0
Port Vale (loan)	Total		20	0	0	0	2	0	0	0	22	0
Southend United (loan)	2016–17	League One	10	0	1	0	—		1	0	12	0
Colchester United (loan)	2017–18	League Two	18	0	1	0	—		0	0	19	0
Dundee (loan)	2018–19	Scottish Premiership	11	0	2	0	—		—		13	0
Newport County (loan)	2019–20	League Two	22	1	3	0	0	0	4	0	29	1
Charlton Athletic	2020–21	League One	13	1	1	0	—		0	0	14	1
Charlton Athletic	2021–22	League One	15	1	1	0	0	0	1	0	17	1
Charlton Athletic	2022–23	League One	36	2	1	0	4	0	0	0	41	2
Charlton Athletic	Total		64	4	3	0	4	0	1	0	72	4
Forest Green Rovers	2023–24	League Two	36	0	1	0	0	0	1	0	38	0
Forest Green Rovers	2024–25	National League	41	5	1	0	—		5 (Note: Two appearances in the FA Trophy, two appearances in the National League Cup, one appearance and one goal in the National League play-offs)	1	47	6
Forest Green Rovers	2025–26	National League	19	1	1	0	—		3 (Note: Three appearances in the National League Cup)	0	23	1
Forest Green Rovers	Total		96	6	3	0	0	0	9	1	108	7
Hornchurch	2026–27	National League	0	0	0	0	—		0	0	0	0
Career total			253	11	13	0	9	0	18	2	293	13
