= Murphy Bennett =

Welsh footballer (born 2004)

Personal information
- Full name: Murphy John Bennett
- Date of birth: 23 December 2004 (age 21)
- Position: Defender

Team information
- Current team: Forest Green Rovers

Youth career
- Manchester City
- 2021–2022: Forest Green Rovers

Senior career*
Years	Team	Apps	(Gls)
2022–	Forest Green Rovers	0	(0)
2023–	→ Gloucester City (loan)	1	(0)

International career^{‡}
- Wales U16
2021–2022	Wales U18	2	(0)
2022–	Wales U18	2	(0)
- * Club domestic league appearances and goals as of 13:36. 3 October 2023 (UTC) ‡ National team caps and goals as of 00:00, 27 September 2022 (UTC)

Murphy John Bennett (born 23 December 2004) is a professional footballer who plays as a defender for National League club Forest Green Rovers.

== Club career ==
Bennett joined the scholarship program at Forest Green Rovers in June 2021, having previously been with the youth system at Manchester City and having represented Wales at under-16 level. He made his first-team debut on 12 October 2021, in a 2–2 draw with Brighton & Hove Albion U21 in an EFL Trophy match at The New Lawn. He joined Gloucester City on a month's loan in September 2023.

== International career ==
Bennett was called up to the Wales under-18 squad in August 2021.

== Career statistics ==
As of match played 18 October 2022

Appearances and goals by club, season and competition
Club	Season	League			FA Cup		EFL Cup		Other		Total	
Club	Season	Division	Apps	Goals	Apps	Goals	Apps	Goals	Apps	Goals	Apps	Goals
Forest Green Rovers	2021–22	EFL League Two	0	0	0	0	0	0	1 (Note: Appearance in EFL Trophy)	0	1	0
Forest Green Rovers	2022–23	EFL League One	0	0	0	0	0	0	1	0	1	0
Forest Green Rovers	Total		0	0	0	0	0	0	2	0	2	0
Career total			0	0	0	0	0	0	2	0	2	0
