= Reece Welch =

English footballer (born 2003)

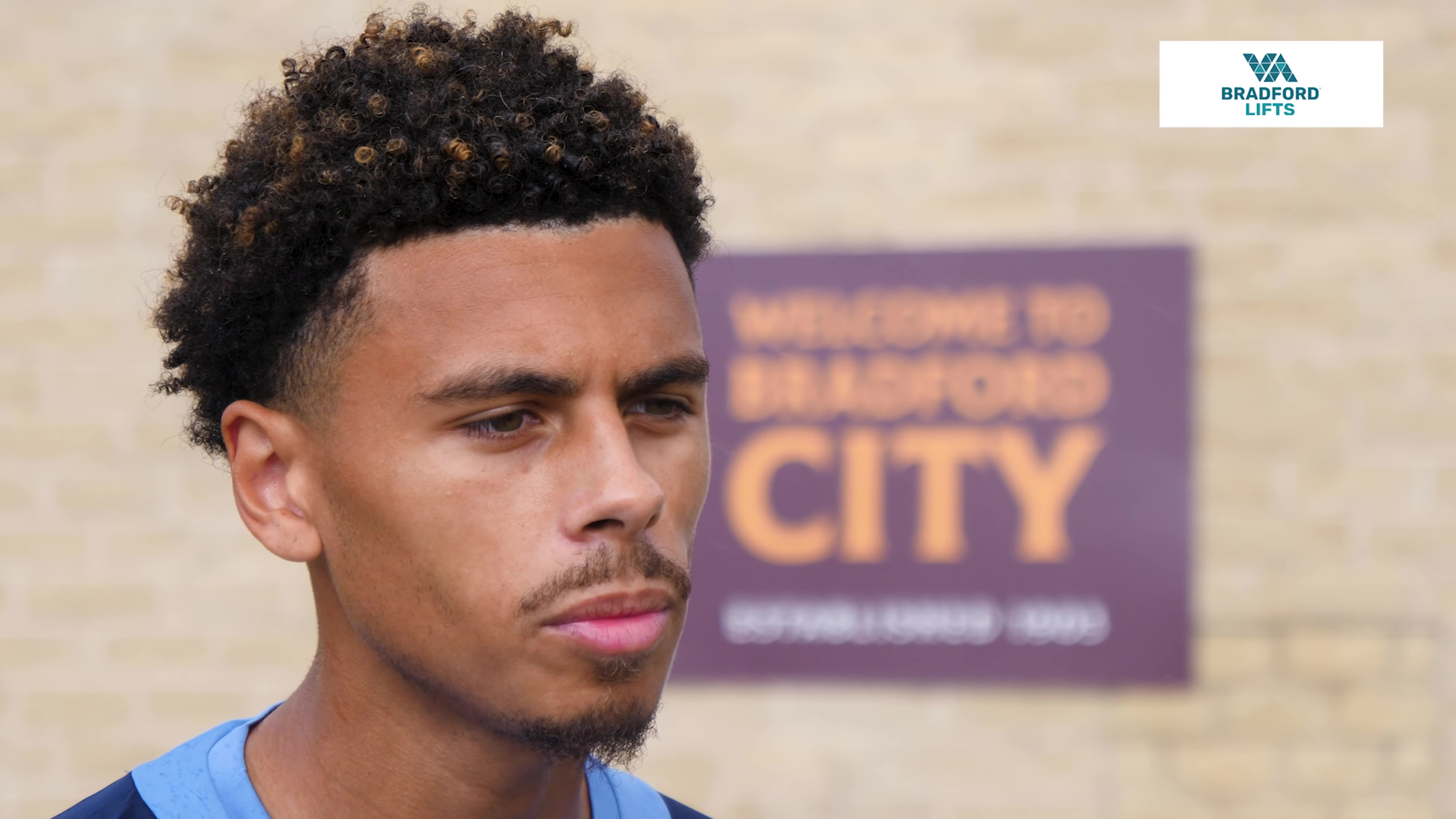

Personal information
- Full name: Reece Belfield Welch
- Date of birth: 19 September 2003 (age 23)
- Place of birth: Huddersfield, England
- Height: 1.97 m (6 ft 6 in)
- Position: Centre-back

Team information
- Current team: Bradford City
- Number: 2

Youth career
- 2010–2022: Everton

Senior career*
Years	Team	Apps	(Gls)
2022–2026	Everton	0	(0)
2023	→ Forest Green Rovers (loan)	17	(0)
2024	→ Deinze (loan)	2	(0)
2026–	Bradford City	2	(0)

International career^{‡}
2019	England U16	4	(0)
2017	England U17	1	(0)
2021	England U19	1	(0)
2021–2022	England U20	4	(0)
- * Club domestic league appearances and goals as of 11 October 2026 (UTC) ‡ National team caps and goals as of 19:31, 27 September 2022 (UTC)

Reece Belfield Welch (born 19 September 2003) is an English professional footballer who plays as a centre-back for EFL League One club Bradford City.

== Club career ==
Welch joined the Everton academy at the age of 7. In September 2020, he signed his first professional contract with the club, signing on for three years. On 3 March 2022, Welch made his professional debut as a substitute in the 2–0 FA Cup victory over Boreham Wood.

On 10 August 2023, Welch joined League Two club Forest Green Rovers on a season-long loan deal. On 3 January 2024, he was recalled by Everton after making 23 appearances in all competitions.

On 6 September 2024, Welch joined Challenger Pro League club Deinze on a season-long loan deal. He returned to Everton in December 2024 after Deinze was declared bankrupt and ceased operations.

On 9 June 2026, Everton announced that they were releasing Welch at the expiration of his contract that summer.

On 5 August 2026, Welch signed a 2-year contract with EFL League One club Bradford City.

== International career ==
Born in England, Welch is of Jamaican descent. He has played for England at various youth international levels.

== Career statistics ==
=== Club ===
As of end of 2025–26 season

Appearances and goals by club, season and competition
Club	Season	League			National cup (Note: Includes FA Cup, Belgian Cup)		League cup (Note: Includes EFL Cup)		Other		Total	
Club	Season	Division	Apps	Goals	Apps	Goals	Apps	Goals	Apps	Goals	Apps	Goals
Everton U21	2021–22	—			—		—		3 (Note: Appearance(s) in EFL Trophy)	0	3	0
Everton U21	2022–23	—			—		—		4	0	4	0
Everton U21	2024–25	—			—		—		1	0	1	0
Everton U21	2025–26	—			—		—		1	0	1	0
Everton U21	Total		—		—		—		9	0	9	0
Everton	2021–22	Premier League	0	0	1	0	0	0	—		1	0
Everton	2022–23	Premier League	0	0	0	0	1	0	—		1	0
Everton	2023–24	Premier League	0	0	0	0	—		—		0	0
Everton	2024–25	Premier League	0	0	0	0	0	0	—		0	0
Everton	2025–26	Premier League	0	0	1	0	0	0	—		1	0
Everton	Total		0	0	2	0	1	0	—		3	0
Forest Green Rovers (loan)	2023–24	League Two	17	0	3	0	—		4	0	24	0
Deinze (loan)	2024–25	Challenger Pro League	2	0	1	0	—		—		3	0
Career total			19	0	6	0	1	0	13	0	39	0
