= Tyrese Omotoye =

Belgian footballer (born 2002)

Personal information
- Full name: Tyrese Demola Huxley Omotoye
- Date of birth: 23 September 2002 (age 24)
- Place of birth: Hasselt, Belgium
- Position: Forward

Team information
- Current team: Vysočina Jihlava
- Number: 9

Youth career
- Cray Wanderers
- –2020: Norwich City

Senior career*
Years	Team	Apps	(Gls)
2020–2023	Norwich City	3	(0)
2021	→ Swindon Town (loan)	7	(0)
2021–2022	→ Leyton Orient (loan)	4	(0)
2022	→ Carlisle United (loan)	13	(0)
2023–2025	Forest Green Rovers	54	(1)
2025–	Vysočina Jihlava	30	(8)

International career
2017	Belgium U16	1	(0)
- * Club domestic league appearances and goals as of 28 May 2026

Tyrese Demola Huxley Omotoye (born 23 September 2002) is a Belgian professional footballer who plays as a forward for Czech National Football League club Vysočina Jihlava.

== Club career ==
Omotoye played for Cray Wanderers before joining Norwich City. On 17 October 2019, he signed his first professional contract with Norwich City. On 7 October 2020, he scored a hat-trick for the under-21 side in a 5–0 win over Newport County in the EFL Trophy. On 2 December 2020, Omotoye made his professional debut for Norwich City, coming on as a substitute in a 3–1 loss to Luton Town. In January 2021, Omotoye signed on loan at Swindon Town in League One for the remainder of the 2020–21 season. In August 2021, he joined League Two side Leyton Orient on a season-long loan deal. On 5 January 2022, Omotoye joined Carlisle United on loan until the end of the season following his recall from Leyton Orient. On 23 January 2023, Omotoye joined Forest Green Rovers on a permanent deal.

In July 2025, Omotoye joined Czech National Football League side Vysočina Jihlava.

== International career ==
Omotoye has represented Belgium at under-16 level, selected in matchday squads against Portugal and Ukraine in November 2017.

== Personal life ==
Omotoye was born in Belgium to Nigerian parents but raised in England. In 2019, he decided that Nigeria was the country he wanted to play international football for.

== Career statistics ==
As of match played 7 November 2025

Appearances and goals by club, season and competition
Club	Season	League			National cup (Note: Includes FA Cup and Czech Cup)		League cup (Note: Includes EFL Cup)		Other		Total	
Club	Season	Division	Apps	Goals	Apps	Goals	Apps	Goals	Apps	Goals	Apps	Goals
Norwich City U21	2020–21	—			—		—		3 (Note: Appearance(s) in EFL Trophy)	4	3	4
Norwich City	2020–21	Championship	3	0	1	0	—		—		4	0
Norwich City	2021–22	Premier League	0	0	0	0	0	0	—		0	0
Norwich City	2022–23	Championship	0	0	0	0	0	0	—		0	0
Norwich City	Total		3	0	1	0	0	0	—		4	0
Swindon Town (loan)	2020–21	League One	7	0	—		—		—		7	0
Leyton Orient (loan)	2021–22	League Two	4	0	0	0	—		4	0	8	0
Carlisle United (loan)	2021–22	League Two	13	0	—		—		—		13	0
Forest Green Rovers	2022–23	League One	17	0	—		—		—		17	0
Forest Green Rovers	2023–24	League Two	34	1	3	2	1	1	4	2	42	6
Forest Green Rovers	2024–25	National League	4	0	1	0	—		3 (Note: Appearance(s) in National League Cup)	0	8	0
Forest Green Rovers	Total		55	1	4	2	1	1	7	2	67	6
Vysočina Jihlava	2025–26	Czech National Football League	16	2	3	2	—		—		19	4
Career total			98	3	8	4	1	1	14	6	121	14
