= Jamie Robson =

Scottish footballer (born 1997)

Personal information
- Full name: Jamie David Robson
- Date of birth: 19 December 1997 (age 28)
- Place of birth: Perth, Scotland
- Height: 5 ft 8 in (1.73 m)
- Position: Left-back

Team information
- Current team: Oldham Athletic
- Number: 3

Youth career
- Dundee
- Coupar Angus Boys Club
- Rangers
- 2011–2014: Dundee United

Senior career*
Years	Team	Apps	(Gls)
2014–2021	Dundee United	133	(3)
2016	→ Brechin City (loan)	6	(2)
2021–2023	Lincoln City	39	(0)
2023–2025	Forest Green Rovers	113	(5)
2025–	Oldham Athletic	42	(0)
- * Club domestic league appearances and goals as of 07:07, 5 May 2026 (UTC)

Jamie David Robson (born 19 December 1997) is a Scottish professional footballer who plays as a left-back for Oldham Athletic. He made his first team debut in September 2015 for Dundee United and has also played for Brechin City on loan during 2016.

== Early life ==
Robson was born in Perth on 19 December 1997 and attended Blairgowrie High School. In his youth football career he was attached to Dundee and Rangers, as well as playing for Coupar Angus Boys Club. He joined Dundee United as a youth player in 2011.

== Career ==
=== Dundee United ===
Robson signed his first professional contract with Dundee United in June 2014 and made his first team debut on 22 September 2015 in a Scottish League Cup match against Dunfermline Athletic. In January 2016, he signed a new contract to tie him to Dundee United until 2018.

Robson joined League One team Brechin City on loan in March 2016, going on to make six appearances, scoring twice. After returning from loan in May 2016 following the end of Brechin's season, Robson was listed as a substitute in a Scottish Premiership match against Inverness Caledonian Thistle, in contravention of registration rules. The rule breach led to Dundee United being deducted three points and fined £30,000.

Robson scored his first goal for Dundee United on 20 August 2016, in a 3–0 home victory against Ayr United.

On 7 August 2021, Robson scored the only goal of the game in Dundee United's 1–0 Scottish Premiership win over defending league champions Rangers, ending Rangers' 40-match unbeaten run in the competition which stretched back to March 2020. The BBC named Robson as Man of the Match.

=== Lincoln City ===
On 31 August 2021, Robson would join English EFL League One club, Lincoln City signing a long-term contract for an undisclosed fee. He would go on to make his debut away to Cambridge United.

=== Forest Green Rovers ===
On 6 January 2023, Robson joined League One rivals Forest Green Rovers for an undisclosed fee.

On 7 August 2025, Robson joined newly-promoted League Two side Oldham Athletic on a two-year deal.

== Career statistics ==
As of end of 2023–24 season

Appearances and goals by club, season and competition
Club	Season	League			National cup		League cup		Other		Total	
Club	Season	Division	Apps	Goals	Apps	Goals	Apps	Goals	Apps	Goals	Apps	Goals
Dundee United	2014–15	Scottish Premiership	0	0	0	0	0	0	0	0	0	0
Dundee United	2015–16	Scottish Premiership	0	0	0	0	1	0	0	0	1	0
Dundee United	2016–17	Scottish Championship	21	1	1	0	2	0	5 (Note: Two appearances in Scottish Challenge Cup and three in Premiership play-offs)	0	29	1
Dundee United	2017–18	Scottish Championship	30	1	2	0	3	0	3 (Note: Appearances in the Scottish Premiership play-offs)	0	38	1
Dundee United	2018–19	Scottish Championship	19	0	2	0	3	0	4	0	28	0
Dundee United	2019–20	Scottish Championship	23	0	2	0	3	0	1 (Note: Appearance in the Scottish Challenge Cup)	0	29	0
Dundee United	2020–21	Scottish Premiership	36	0	4	0	3	0	0	0	43	0
Dundee United	2021–22	Scottish Premiership	4	1	0	0	2	0	0	0	6	1
Dundee United	Total		133	3	11	0	17	0	13	0	174	3
Brechin City (loan)	2015–16	Scottish League One	6	2	0	0	0	0	0	0	6	2
Lincoln City	2021–22	EFL League One	23	0	1	0	0	0	2 (Note: Appearance(s) in EFL Trophy)	0	26	0
Lincoln City	2022–23	EFL League One	16	0	1	0	0	0	4	0	21	0
Lincoln City	Total		39	0	2	0	0	0	6	0	47	0
Forest Green Rovers	2022–23	EFL League One	21	0	0	0	0	0	0	0	21	0
Forest Green Rovers	2023–24	EFL League Two	46	1	2	0	1	0	4	0	53	1
Forest Green Rovers	Total		67	1	2	0	1	0	4	0	74	1
Career total			245	6	15	0	18	0	23	0	301	6

== Honours ==
Dundee United

- Scottish Challenge Cup: 2016–17
- Scottish Championship: 2019–20
