= Teddy Jenks =

English footballer (born 2002)

Personal information
- Full name: Teddy Christopher Graham Jenks
- Date of birth: 12 March 2002 (age 24)
- Place of birth: Brighton, England
- Height: 1.91 m (6 ft 3 in)
- Position: Midfielder

Team information
- Current team: Carlisle United
- Number: 30

Youth career
- –2021: Brighton & Hove Albion

Senior career*
Years	Team	Apps	(Gls)
2019–2023	Brighton & Hove Albion	0	(0)
2021–2022	→ Aberdeen (loan)	18	(2)
2022–2023	→ Crawley Town (loan)	17	(1)
2023–2025	Forest Green Rovers	35	(2)
2024	→ Ross County (loan)	6	(0)
2025–2026	Worthing	36	(13)
2026-	Carlisle United	0	(0)

International career^{‡}
2017	England U16	1	(0)
2019	England U17	3	(1)
- * Club domestic league appearances and goals as of 17 December 2025 ‡ National team caps and goals as of 22:15, 25 February 2020 (UTC)

Teddy Christopher Graham Jenks (born 12 March 2002) is an English footballer who plays as a midfielder for National League club Carlisle United.

== Club career ==
=== Brighton & Hove Albion ===
Jenks made his professional debut for Brighton & Hove Albion, on 25 September 2019 starting in a 3–1 defeat at home against Aston Villa in the EFL Cup despite playing well. He came on as a substitute in the 2–0 away win over Preston in the EFL Cup on 23 September 2020, Jenks' first appearance in almost a year for the senior side.

On 16 June 2023, Jenks was released from his contract with Brighton.

==== Aberdeen (loan) ====
On 14 June 2021, it was announced that Jenks would join Scottish Premiership club Aberdeen on loan for the 2021–22 season. He made his debut on 22 July, coming on as a 90+6 minute substitute for fellow debutant Christian Ramirez in a 5–1 home victory over BK Häcken in the new UEFA Europa Conference League. A week later he came on for Jay Emmanuel-Thomas in the 50th minute in the second leg away at Häcken where The Dons lost 2–0, however they progressed into the Europa Conference main draw after winning 5–3 on aggregate. On 8 August, he made his first league appearance of his career starting in the Scottish Premiership away fixture at Livingston and scoring the equaliser in the eventual 2–1 victory. Jenks was sent off on his eighth Aberdeen appearance after being shown a second yellow card in an eventual 3–2 away loss against St Mirren on 26 September. He scored his second goal for The Dons on 11 December, striking late to score the winner and only goal of the game in the 1–0 away victory over St Johnstone.

==== Crawley Town (loan) ====
On 29 July 2022, Jenks joined EFL League Two club Crawley Town on a season-long loan.

=== Forest Green Rovers ===
On 23 June 2023, it was confirmed that Jenks had signed for League Two side Forest Green Rovers after being released by Brighton.

In January 2024, he joined Scottish Premiership club Ross County on loan for the remainder of the season.

=== Worthing ===
On 16 September 2025, Jenks joined National League South club Worthing.

== International career ==
Jenks was a member of the England under-17 squad at the 2019 UEFA European Under-17 Championship and scored against Sweden as they were eliminated at the group stage.

== Personal life ==
Jenks' younger brother, Eliot, plays for Brighton U18s, becoming a first-year professional for the 2021–22 season.

== Career statistics ==
As of 25 January 2024

Appearances and goals by club, season and competition
Club	Season	League			Domestic Cup		League Cup		Other		Total	
Club	Season	Division	Apps	Goals	Apps	Goals	Apps	Goals	Apps	Goals	Apps	Goals
Brighton & Hove Albion U21	2019–20	—			—		—		2 (Note: Appearances in EFL Trophy)	0	2	0
Brighton & Hove Albion	2019–20	Premier League	0	0	0	0	1	0	—		1	0
Brighton & Hove Albion	2020–21	Premier League	0	0	0	0	1	0	—		1	0
Brighton & Hove Albion	2021–22	Premier League	0	0	0	0	0	0	—		0	0
Brighton & Hove Albion	2022–23	Premier League	0	0	0	0	0	0	—		0	0
Brighton & Hove Albion	Total		0	0	0	0	2	0	0	0	2	0
Aberdeen (loan)	2021–22	Scottish Premiership	18	2	1	0	1	0	4 (Note: Appearances in UEFA Europa Conference League)	0	24	2
Crawley Town (loan)	2022–23	League Two	17	1	0	0	2	0	2	0	21	1
Forest Green Rovers	2023-24	League Two	16	0	2	0	1	0	4	0	23	0
Forest Green Rovers	2024-25	National League	19	2	1	0	–		2 (Note: Two appearances in National League Cup)	0	22	2
Forest Green Rovers	Total		35	2	3	0	1	0	6	0	55	2
Ross County (loan)	2023–24	Scottish Premiership	6	0	0	0	–		0	0	6	0
Worthing	2025–26	National League South	36	13	3	1	—		1 (Note: One appearance in FA Trophy)	1	16	2
Career total			88	5	7	1	6	0	15	1	116	7
