= Kyle McAllister =

Scottish footballer (born 1999)

Personal information
- Full name: Kyle McAllister
- Date of birth: 21 January 1999 (age 27)
- Place of birth: Paisley, Scotland
- Height: 1.75 m (5 ft 9 in)
- Positions: Midfielder; forward

Team information
- Current team: Forest Green Rovers
- Number: 7

Youth career
- Rangers
- 2013–2016: St Mirren

Senior career*
| Years | Team | Apps | (Gls) |
| 2016–2017 | St Mirren | 14 | (0) |
| 2017–2019 | Derby County | 0 | (0) |
| 2019 | → St Mirren (loan) | 14 | (2) |
| 2019–2022 | St Mirren | 61 | (1) |
| 2022 | → Partick Thistle (loan) | 3 | (0) |
| 2022– | Forest Green Rovers | 150 | (25) |

International career^{‡}
| 2015–2016 | Scotland U17 | 8 | (0) |
| 2019 | Scotland U21 | 1 | (0) |
- * Club domestic league appearances and goals as of 02:30, 27 January 2026 (UTC) ‡ National team caps and goals as of 00:23, 23 March 2019 (UTC)

Kyle McAllister (born 21 January 1999) is a Scottish professional footballer who plays as a midfielder or forward for National League side Forest Green Rovers. He came through the youth system at St Mirren, and after moving to England to play for Derby County, he returned to St Mirren on loan in January 2019, and on a permanent basis in August 2019. McAllister has also represented Scotland at under-17 and under-21 level.

== Club career ==
McAllister, who attended Renfrew High School, began his career with Scottish Championship club St Mirren, making his first team debut on 13 February 2016, coming on as a second-half substitute in 1–0 defeat against Queen of the South. His first full start for the side came the following week, when the Saints defeated relegation threatened Dumbarton 1–0.

During the 2016–17 season, McAllister made 14 appearances for St Mirren, scoring his first goal in a Scottish Cup match against Lowland League side Spartans, described as "ferocious shot" following a run from his own half. After interest from a number of English clubs, he signed for English Championship side Derby County on 27 January 2017 for an undisclosed fee, reported to be £225,000.

In January 2019, having been unable to break through to the first team at Derby with his progress hampered by a groin injury, McAllister returned to St Mirren on loan until the end of the season. Just days later, he marked his return to the club by scoring the winning goal in a 3–2 Scottish Cup win at home to Alloa Athletic, (it was awarded 'goal of the round', as had his debut strike in 2016) and made 14 Scottish Premiership appearances as the club stayed in the division via the relegation playoff.

On 9 August 2019, McAllister left Derby and signed a three-year contract with St Mirren.

On 31 January 2022, McAllister joined Scottish Championship side Partick Thistle on loan until the end of the season.

On 17 June 2022, McAllister agreed to join recently promoted League One club Forest Green Rovers following his release from St Mirren.

== International career ==
Having previously appeared for the under-17 team, McAllister made his debut for the Scotland under-21 team in March 2019.

== Career statistics ==
As of match played 1 January 2025

Appearances and goals by club, season and competition
| Club | Season | League | | | FA Cup | | League Cup | | Other | | Total | |
| Club | Season | Division | Apps | Goals | Apps | Goals | Apps | Goals | Apps | Goals | Apps | Goals |
|---|---|---|---|---|---|---|---|---|---|---|---|---|
| St Mirren | 2015–16 | Scottish Championship | 4 | 0 | 0 | 0 | 0 | 0 | 0 | 0 | 4 | 0 |
| St Mirren | 2016–17 | Scottish Championship | 10 | 0 | 2 | 1 | 1 | 0 | 1 | 0 | 14 | 1 |
| St Mirren | Total | | 14 | 0 | 2 | 1 | 1 | 0 | 1 | 0 | 18 | 1 |
| Derby County | 2016–17 | Championship | 0 | 0 | 0 | 0 | 0 | 0 | 0 | 0 | 0 | 0 |
| Derby County | 2017–18 | Championship | 0 | 0 | 0 | 0 | 0 | 0 | 0 | 0 | 0 | 0 |
| Derby County | 2018–19 | Championship | 0 | 0 | 0 | 0 | 0 | 0 | 0 | 0 | 0 | 0 |
| Derby County | Total | | 0 | 0 | 0 | 0 | 0 | 0 | 0 | 0 | 0 | 0 |
| St Mirren (loan) | 2018–19 | Scottish Premiership | 14 | 2 | 2 | 1 | 0 | 0 | 2 (Note: Two appearances in the Scottish Premiership play-offs) | 0 | 18 | 3 |
| St Mirren | 2019–20 | Scottish Premiership | 15 | 0 | 3 | 0 | 0 | 0 | 0 | 0 | 18 | 0 |
| St Mirren | 2020–21 | Scottish Premiership | 35 | 1 | 2 | 0 | 6 | 0 | — | | 43 | 1 |
| St Mirren | 2021–22 | Scottish Premiership | 11 | 0 | 1 | 1 | 2 | 0 | — | | 14 | 1 |
| St Mirren | Total | | 61 | 1 | 6 | 1 | 8 | 0 | 0 | 0 | 75 | 2 |
| Partick Thistle (loan) | 2021–22 | Scottish Championship | 3 | 0 | 0 | 0 | 0 | 0 | 0 | 0 | 3 | 0 |
| Forest Green Rovers | 2022–23 | League One | 33 | 1 | 2 | 0 | 2 | 0 | 3 (Note: Appearance(s) in EFL Trophy) | 0 | 40 | 1 |
| Forest Green Rovers | 2023–24 | League Two | 44 | 6 | 2 | 1 | 1 | 0 | 0 | 0 | 47 | 7 |
| Forest Green Rovers | 2024–25 | National League | 23 | 8 | 2 | 0 | — | | 1 (Note: Appearance in FA Trophy) | 0 | 26 | 8 |
| Forest Green Rovers | Total | | 100 | 15 | 6 | 1 | 3 | 0 | 4 | 0 | 113 | 16 |
| Career total | | | 192 | 18 | 16 | 4 | 12 | 0 | 7 | 0 | 226 | 22 |

== Honours ==
Individual

- National League Player of the Month: October 2024
- National League Team of the Season: 2024–25
