= Jamie Searle =

New Zealand footballer

Personal information
- Full name: Jamie Spencer Searle
- Date of birth: 25 November 2000 (age 25)
- Place of birth: Whakatāne, New Zealand
- Height: 1.91 m (6 ft 3 in)
- Position: Goalkeeper

Team information
- Current team: Hampton & Richmond Borough
- Number: 13

Youth career
- 2008–2015: Whakatāne Town
- 2016: Cambridge FC
- 2017–2018: Melville United

Senior career*
Years	Team	Apps	(Gls)
2018–2019	Melville United	3	(0)
2019–2020	Aston Villa	0	(0)
2020–2022	Swansea City	0	(0)
2022–2023	Barnsley	1	(0)
2023–2025	Forest Green Rovers	2	(0)
2025–2026	Eastbourne Borough	7	(0)
2026	Eastleigh	0	(0)
2026	Wealdstone	0	(0)
2026–	Hampton & Richmond Borough	1	(0)

International career^{‡}
2021	New Zealand U-23	1	(0)
2022–	New Zealand	1	(0)
- * Club domestic league appearances and goals as of 23:23, 25 October 2026 (UTC) ‡ National team caps and goals as of 25 March 2022

Jamie Searle (born 25 November 2000) is a New Zealand footballer who plays as a goalkeeper for National League South club Hampton & Richmond Borough.

He was part of the New Zealand squad in the football competition at the 2020 Summer Olympics and made his senior debut in March 2022. Searle played senior football for his local side Melville United while still a teenager, earning an academy place at Aston Villa after a trial, before spells at Swansea City and Barnsley.

== Early life ==
Searle was born in 2000 in Whakatāne, and played for Whakatāne Town, Tauranga City and Cambridge FC in his early years. He completed his secondary education at St Peter's School in Cambridge, south-east of Hamilton.

== Club career ==
=== Melville United and Aston Villa ===
Searle began to play for the first team of Melville United during his time at school, making three appearances over three years.

Searle's manager at Melville United, Sam Wilkinson, organised a month-long trial with Aston Villa, and after impressing in friendly matches he signed his first professional contract in August 2019. For the first half-year, either his father or his mother was living with him in Birmingham; during the COVID-19 pandemic he lived on his own.

=== Swansea City ===
After his time at Aston Villa, Searle trialled for Blackpool, Sunderland and Swansea City; in July 2020, he signed a one-year contract with Swansea. On 15 June 2021, he signed a one-year extension, with a club option to extend for another season. He was released by Swansea City at the end of his contract on 30 June 2022.

=== Barnsley ===
On 16 June 2022, Searle agreed to join League One club Barnsley on a two-year deal upon the expiration of his Swansea City contract.

=== Forest Green Rovers ===
On 23 July 2023, Searle was announced at Forest Green Rovers.

=== Non-League ===
On 20 June 2025, Searle signed for Eastbourne Borough as their new number one.

In September 2026, Searle joined National League club Eastleigh on a short-term deal. He departed the club the following month without having made an appearance, joining Wealdstone on non-contract terms.

On 24 October 2026, Searle signed for National League South side Hampton & Richmond Borough.

== International career ==
Searle was a member of the New Zealand Olympic football team at the Tokyo 2020 games but did not play in their run to the quarter-finals. Searle made his debut for the senior New Zealand side in March 2022, playing the full 90 minutes in a World Cup qualifier against New Caledonia.
