= The New Lawn =

Sports venue in Gloucestershire, England

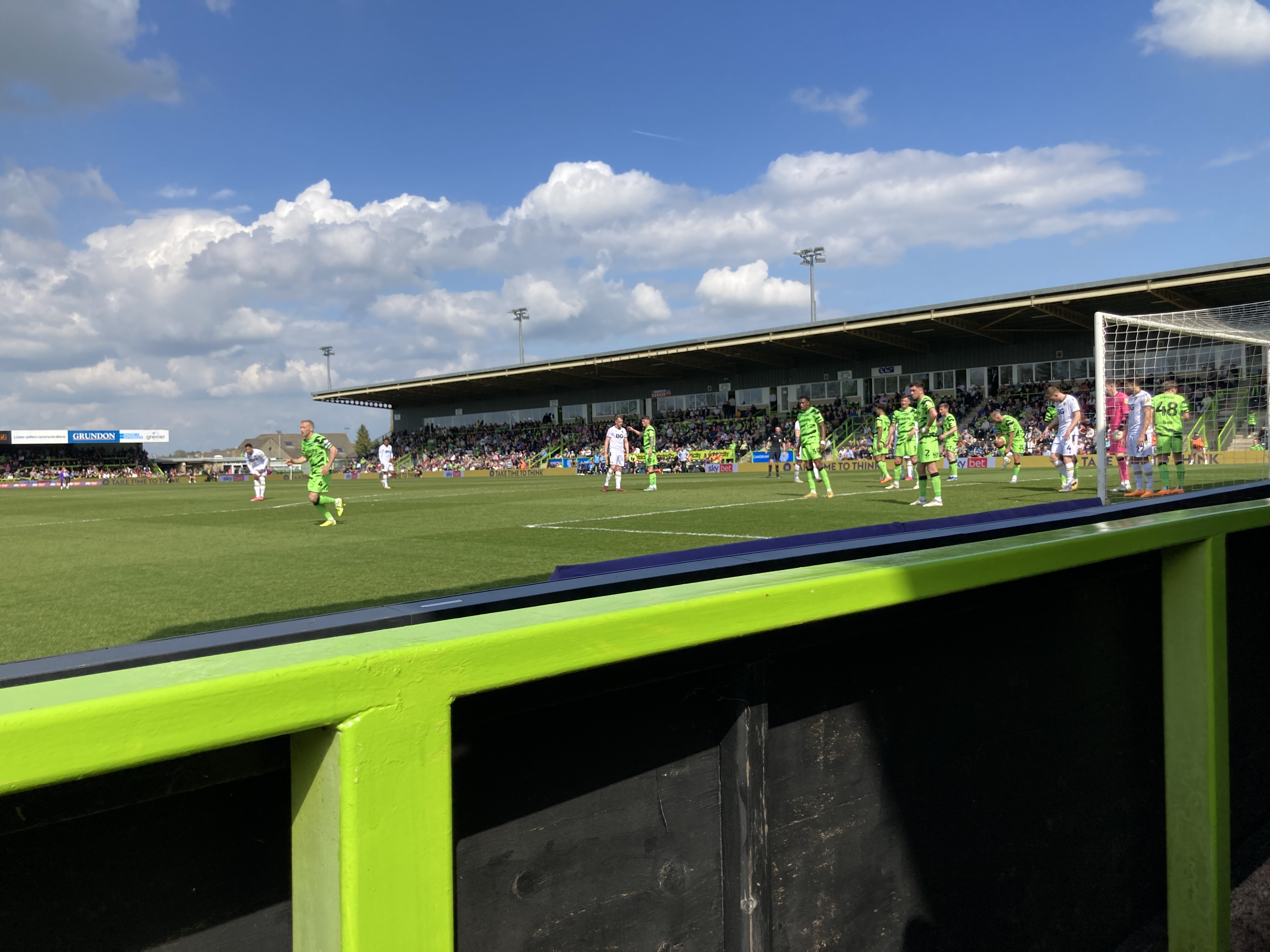
- The New Lawn in 2023

- Location of The New Lawn
- Full name: The New Lawn Stadium
- Location: Nailsworth, Gloucestershire
- Coordinates: 51°41′56″N 2°14′16″W
- Capacity: 5,147 (2,000 seated)
- Surface: Grass
- Record attendance: 4,836 (Forest Green Rovers vs Derby County, 3 January 2009)
- Field size: 101 by 64 metres (110 by 70 yd)

Construction
- Built: 2005–2006
- Opened: 2006

Tenants
- Forest Green Rovers (2006–present); Gloucester City (2007–2008)

The New Lawn, also known as The Bolt New Lawn for sponsorship reasons, is a football stadium in Nailsworth, Gloucestershire. It has been the home stadium of National League club Forest Green Rovers since 2006. During the 2007–08 season the stadium was shared with Gloucester City. The stadium has a capacity of 5,147, of which 2,000 is seated. It replaced The Lawn Ground as Forest Green Rovers' home stadium and there are plans for it to be replaced by a new stadium development located near the M5 motorway. In 2020 the ground was renamed The Innocent New Lawn Stadium due to a sponsorship deal with Innocent Drinks. In 2021, the stadium was renamed after the YouTube channel Fully Charged.

== Stadium ==
The stadium was due to cost the club £3 million and was approved in October 2003 by local council members, despite much local opposition due to the controversial siting of the development on school playing fields. Work started on the stadium on 3 May 2005.

The new ground has facilities to house 230 car parking places, 3 coach parking places, a capacity of 5,147 and two seated stands - the main stand and another seated stand. The stadium also has a leisure club, gym, sauna, conference and meeting facilities as well as a pub and many other facilities. The stadium is used seven days a week for different events. The closest railway station to the stadium is Stroud.

The stadium was first used in a pre season friendly against Swindon Town in July 2006 and was officially opened in September 2006 when the England C team played a friendly fixture against Forest Green.

For the 2007–08 season Gloucester City shared the ground due to serious flooding at their home stadium. They have since returned to the city of Gloucester following spells at Cirencester Town, Cheltenham Town and Evesham United.

In April 2009, The New Lawn hosted the Conference League Cup final between Forest Green and AFC Telford United in which Telford won the game 0-3 on penalty kicks following the 90 minutes finishing goalless. The match was shown live on Setanta Sports. In December 2009 the ground was selected as part of the city of Bristol's 2018 FIFA World Cup bid to act as a training ground facility.

In June 2011, work began on the pitch at the stadium to make it the first organic football pitch in the world.

This was then followed in December 2011 by the installation of 180 solar panels to the EESI stand to help the club generate its own electricity.

In April 2012, the club introduced the first solar powered robotic lawn mower to be used on a football pitch in British football. The Etesia robot mower - known as a 'mow bot' - uses GPS technology to automatically guide it round the pitch without the need for human intervention.

In August 2012, a Manchester United XI played a pre-season friendly at the ground in aid of the Sustainability in Sport foundation which was created by Forest Green chairman Dale Vince and Gary Neville.

On 25 August 2014, a BT Sport televised Conference National derby game with Bristol Rovers saw 3,781 in attendance, the highest ever recorded league attendance at the stadium. The record was subsequently broken a number of times, with the current record being 4,788 for a EFL League One match against Bristol Rovers on 11 March 2023. The record attendance in all competitions is 4,836 for a FA Cup Third Round 4-3 defeat to Derby County on 3 January 2009.

The stadium hosted what is believed to be the world's first ever vegan football match on 1 November 2014 in a Conference National game against Lincoln City. The match received support from Paul and Stella McCartney.

== Environmental features ==
Following the investment of new chairman and eco-tycoon Dale Vince, and his company Ecotricity, The New Lawn employs a number of eco-friendly features designed to help make the stadium one of the most environmentally sustainable football stadiums in the world. The playing surface features as the world's first organic football pitch, while solar panels on the roof of the stadium as well as outside will eventually provide enough electricity to power 25 per cent of the stadium.

The pitch also collects rainwater to be recycled around the stadium and all waste cooking oil at the club is recycled into biofuel. The club introduced a solar powered 'MowBot' in April 2012 which cuts the grass on the pitch and uses GPS technology to automatically guide it round the pitch without the need for human intervention.

Local farmers use the grass cuttings from the stadium to condition their soil plus the stadium is the first meat-free football stadium in the country after the club changed to an environmentally sustainable menu in February 2011. The area outside the stadium has also been developed into a habitat for wildlife through the planting of wild flowers and native trees.

In December 2012, the club beat 200 other nominees to first prize in the Institute of Groundsmanship awards in the sustainability and environmental category for its organic pitch and the environmental aspects at The New Lawn.
