= 2022–23 Cambridge United F.C. season =

Cambridge United FC
2022–23 season
- Owner: Paul Barry (70%), Mark Green (20%), Adam Webb (10%)
- Head coach: Mark Bonner
- Stadium: Abbey Stadium
- League One: 20th
- FA Cup: Second round (eliminated by Grimsby Town)
- EFL Cup: Second round (eliminated by Southampton)
- EFL Trophy: Group stage
- Top goalscorer: League: Sam Smith (13); All: Sam Smith (14)
- Highest home attendance: 7,711 (vs Peterborough United, 15 April 2023, EFL League One)
- Lowest home attendance: 5,005 (vs Exeter City, 13 August 2022, EFL League One)
- Average home league attendance: 6,199
- Biggest win: 2–0 vs Lincoln City (H), (3 September 2022); EFL League One
- Biggest defeat: 5-0 vs Sheffield Wednesday (A) (2 January 2023); EFL League One
Home colours	Away colours

The 2022–23 season is the 111th season in the existence of Cambridge United Football Club and the club's second consecutive season in League One. In addition to the league, they will also compete in the 2022–23 FA Cup, the 2022–23 EFL Cup and the 2022–23 EFL Trophy.

== Transfers ==
=== In ===
Date	Pos	Player	Transferred from	Fee	Ref
30 June 2022	CF	Saikou Janneh (GAM)	Bristol City	Free transfer	
1 July 2022 (Note: The transfer was announced on 18 May, and would become official on July 1 once his Reading contract expired)	GK	James Holden (ENG)	Reading	Free transfer	
6 July 2022	LB	Brandon Haunstrup (ENG)	Kilmarnock (SCO)	Free transfer	
18 July 2022	CB	Zeno Ibsen Rossi (ENG)	Bournemouth	Undisclosed	
29 July 2022	CF	Fejiri Okenabirhie (NGA)	Doncaster Rovers	Free transfer	
6 January 2023	CB	Ryan Bennett (ENG)	Swansea City	Free transfer	
26 January 2023	CB	Michael Morrison (ENG)	Portsmouth	Free transfer	
31 January 2023	AM	George Thomas (WAL)	Queens Park Rangers	Free transfer	

=== Out ===
Date	Pos	Player	Transferred to	Fee	Source
30 June 2022	CB	Tom Dickens (ENG)		Released	
30 June 2022	AM	Wes Hoolahan (IRL)		Released	
30 June 2022	LB	Jack Iredale (AUS)	Bolton Wanderers	Rejected contract	
30 June 2022	GK	Kai McKenzie-Lyle (GUY)		Released	

=== Loans in ===
Date	Pos	Player	Loaned from	On loan until	Ref
6 January 2023	LB	Steve Seddon (ENG)	Oxford United	End of season	
24 January 2023	CM	Conor McGrandles (SCO)	Charlton Athletic	End of season	

=== Loans out ===
Date	Pos	Player	Loaned to	On loan until	Ref
15 June 2022	RB	Liam Bennett (ENG)	Walsall	31 December 2022 (Note: On 31 December, Bennett was recalled from his loan at Walsall.)	
5 August 2022	FW	Saleem Akanbi (ENG)	St Neots Town	28 October 2022 (Note: On 28 October, Akanbi was recalled to join Concord Rangers on loan.)	
5 August 2022	GK	Dan Barton (ENG)	St Neots Town		
5 August 2022	CB	Harvey Beckett (ENG)	St Neots Town	23 September 2022 (Note: On 23 September, Beckett was recalled from his loan at St Neots, to join Concord Rangers on loan.)	
5 August 2022	FW	Brandon Njoku (ENG)	St Neots Town		
12 August 2022	GK	Louis Chadwick (ENG)	Cambridge City	12 September 2022	
19 August 2022	MF	George Hoddle (ENG)	St Neots Town	Work Experience	
12 September 2022	AM	Kai Yearn (ENG)	Chelmsford City	31 December 2022 (Note: On 31 December, Yearn was recalled from his loan at Chelmsford)	
23 September 2022	CB	Harvey Beckett (ENG)	Concord Rangers	End of Season (Note: On 30 November, Beckett's loan at Concord Rangers was extended.)	
28 October 2022	FW	Saleem Akanbi (ENG)	Concord Rangers	30 January 2023 (Note: On 30 November, Akanbi's loan at Conord Rangers was extended.) (Note: On 30 December, Akanbi's loan at Concord was extended again by a further month.)	
28 October 2022	CM	Myles Cowling (ENG)	Braintree Town		
30 November 2022	GK	Louis Chadwick (ENG)	Royston Town	30 January 2023 (Note: On 30 December, Chadwick's loan at Royston was extended by a further month.)	
16 December 2022	CB	Mamadou Jobe (ENG)	St Albans City	23 January 2023 (Note: It was announced on 23 January that Jobe had joined Maidstone on loan)	
30 December 2022	FW	Glenn McConnell (IRL)	St Albans City	30 January 2023	
7 January 2023	FW	Brandon Njoku (ENG)	Cheshunt	Work experience	
13 January 2023	AM	Kai Yearn (ENG)	Chelmsford City		
23 January 2023	CB	Mamadou Jobe (ENG)	Maidstone United	End of season	
24 January 2023	CF	Saikou Janneh (GAM)	AFC Wimbledon	End of season	
11 February 2023	CM	Lewis Simper (ENG)	Woking	17 March 2023	
17 February 2023	GK	James Holden (ENG)	Dulwich Hamlet	17 March 2023	
22 March 2023	CM	Lewis Simper (ENG)	Wealdstone	End of season	

== Pre-season and friendlies ==
On 30 May, Cambridge United announced their first two pre-season friendlies, against Cardiff City and Norwich City. A third friendly at a neutral ground against Notts County was later confirmed. On June 16, another home friendly was confirmed, against Hull City.

Win Draw Loss Fixtures

9 July 2022 Friendly	Cardiff City	3–2	Cambridge United	Leckwith
13:00 BST	Collins 9'; Watters 54'; Bagan 70'	Report	Knibbs 37'; Janneh 89'	Stadium: Cardiff International Sports Stadium

16 July 2022 Friendly	Notts County	0–2	Cambridge United	St Neots
13:00 BST		Report	Smith 33', 67'	Stadium: The Premier Plus Stadium

16 July 2022 Friendly	Notts County	3–2	Cambridge United	St Neots
13:00 BST	Langstaff 52', 55', 59'	Report	Knibbs 11', 25'	Stadium: The Premier Plus Stadium

19 July 2022 Friendly	Cambridge United	1–3	Norwich City	Cambridge
20:00 BST	Smith 43'	Report	Gibbs 59'; Hugill 68', 78'	Stadium: Abbey Stadium; Referee: Neil Hair

23 July 2022 Friendly	Cambridge United	1–2	Hull City	Cambridge
12:00 BST	Smith 5'	Report	Williams 43'; Smith 61' (pen.)	Stadium: Abbey Stadium; Attendance: 1,326; Referee: Chris Pollard

6 December 2022 Friendly	Cambridge United	2–4	West Ham United	Cambridge
19:00 GMT	Ibsen Rossi 29'; Taylor 82' (pen.)	Report	Bowen 30'; Simper 43' (o.g.); Benrahma 69'; Ekwah 71'	Stadium: Abbey Stadium; Attendance: 2,805; Referee: Neil Hair

== Competitions ==
=== Overall record ===
Competition	First match	Last match	Starting round	Final position	Record							
Competition	First match	Last match	Starting round	Final position	Pld	W	D	L	GF	GA	GD	Win %
League One	30 July 2022	May 2023	Matchday 1	20th	46	13	7	26	41	68	−27	28.26
FA Cup	6 November 2022	26 November 2022	First round	Second round	3	0	2	1	1	2	−1	0.00
EFL Cup	2 August 2022	23 August 2022	First round	Second round	2	1	0	1	1	3	−2	50.00
EFL Trophy	30 August 2022	18 October 2022	Group stage	Group Stage	3	2	0	1	3	2	+1	66.67
Total					54	16	9	29	46	75	−29	29.63

Last updated: 7 May 2023
Source: [ Soccerway]

=== League One ===
==== League table ====
Pos	Team	Pld	W	D	L	GF	GA	GD	Pts	Promotion, qualification or relegation
17	Bristol Rovers	46	14	11	21	58	73	−15	53	
18	Port Vale	46	13	10	23	48	71	−23	49	
19	Oxford United	46	11	14	21	49	56	−7	47	
20	Cambridge United	46	13	7	26	41	68	−27	46	
21	Milton Keynes Dons (R)	46	11	12	23	44	66	−22	45	Relegation to EFL League Two
22	Morecambe (R)	46	10	14	22	47	78	−31	44	Relegation to EFL League Two
23	Accrington Stanley (R)	46	11	11	24	40	77	−37	44	Relegation to EFL League Two

Source: EFL Official Website
Rules for classification: 1) Points; 2) Goal difference; 3) Number of goals scored; 4) Head-to-head results; 5) Wins; 6) Away goals; 7) Penalty points (sec 9.5); 8) 12-point sending off offences
(R) Relegated

==== Results summary ====
Overall								Home						Away					
Pld	W	D	L	GF	GA	GD	Pts	W	D	L	GF	GA	GD	W	D	L	GF	GA	GD
46	13	7	26	41	68	−27	46	9	4	10	24	26	−2	4	3	16	17	42	−25

Last updated: 7 May 2023.
Source: [ Soccerway]

==== Results by round ====
Round	1	2	3	4	5	6	7	8	9	10	11	12	13	14	15	16	17	18	19	20	21	22	23	24	25	26	27	28	29	30	31	32	33	34	35	36	37	38	39	40	41	42	43	44	45	46
Ground	H	A	H	A	A	H	H	A	H	A	H	A	A	H	H	A	A	H	H	A	H	H	A	A	H	A	A	H	A	H	H	A	A	H	H	A	H	A	H	A	H	H	A	A	A	H
Result	W	L	W	L	D	W	W	L	L	W	L	L	L	L	L	W	L	D	L	L	D	W	L	L	L	L	D	D	L	L	W	L	L	L	D	L	L	W	W	D	W	L	L	W	L	W
Position	5	14	6	13	10	7	5	6	9	7	10	10	13	18	18	16	17	18	20	20	20	19	19	19	20	22	23	22	23	23	22	23	23	23	23	23	23	23	22	22	21	21	22	22	22	20

Updated to match(es) played on 7 May 2023. Source: [ Soccerway]
A = Away; H = Home; W = Win; D = Draw; L = Loss; P = Postponed

==== Matches ====
Win Draw Loss Fixtures

On 23 June, the league fixtures were announced.

30 July 2022 1	Cambridge United	1–0	Milton Keynes Dons	Cambridge
15:00 BST	Knibbs (yellow card) 9', (goal) 17'; Jones (yellow card) 59'	Report	Lawrence (yellow card) 41'; O'Hora (yellow card) 57'; Oyegoke (yellow card) 89'	Stadium: Abbey Stadium; Attendance: 6,588; Referee: John Busby

6 August 2022 2	Oxford United	1–0	Cambridge United	Littlemore
15:00 BST	Findlay (yellow card) 18'; Browne (yellow card) 47'; Goodrham 90+3'	Report	Dunk (yellow card) 36'	Stadium: The Kassam Stadium; Attendance: 8,057; Referee: Tom Reeves

13 August 2022 3	Cambridge United	2–1	Exeter City	Cambridge
15:00 BST	Digby (yellow card) 29', (goal) 88'; Dunk (yellow card) 44'; Smith 60'; Lankester (yellow card) 90+6'	Report	Brown 39'; Sweeney (yellow card) 45+1'; Coley (yellow card) 86'	Stadium: Abbey Stadium; Attendance: 5,005; Referee: Sam Purkiss

16 August 2022 4	Portsmouth	4–1	Cambridge United	Portsmouth
19:45 BST	Bishop 45+2'; Curtis 60'; Jacobs 70'; Ogilvie 77'	Report	O'Neil (yellow card) 3'; Ironside 30'; Jones (yellow card) 45'; Okedina (yellow card) 64'	Stadium: Fratton Park; Attendance: 17,702; Referee: Christopher Pollard

20 August 2022 5	Charlton Athletic	1–1	Cambridge United	Charlton
15:00 BST	Fraser 41'; Clare (yellow card) 67'	Report	Okedina (yellow card) 6'; Knibbs 60'; Tracey (yellow card) 64'	Stadium: The Valley; Attendance: 12,644; Referee: Carl Brook

27 August 2022 6	Cambridge United	4–3	Burton Albion	Cambridge
15:00 BST	Smith 34', 53', 69'; Digby (yellow card) 38'; O'Neil 79'; Lankester (yellow card) 90+6'	Report	Ahadme 1', 67' (yellow card) 27'; Smith (red card) 10'; Hamer (yellow card) 19'; Brayford 41' (yellow card) 51'; Borthwick-Jackson (yellow card) 90+7'	Stadium: Abbey Stadium; Attendance: 5,130; Referee: Ben Speedie

3 September 2022 7	Cambridge United	2–0	Lincoln City	Cambridge
15:00 BST	Ironside 24', 27'	Report	O'Connor (yellow card) 86'	Stadium: Abbey Stadium; Attendance: 5,677; Referee: Sam Allison

10 September 2022	Ipswich Town	Postponed	Cambridge United	Ipswich
15:00 BST				Stadium: Portman Road
Note: Fixture was postponed as a mark of respect following the passing of Queen Elizabeth II.

13 September 2022 8	Cheltenham Town	2–1	Cambridge United	Cheltenham
19:45 BST	Nlundulu 59' (yellow card) 88'; Broom (yellow card) 77'; May 83'; Southwood (yellow card) 90+4'	Report	May 28'; Knibbs (yellow card) 45+1'; Brophy (yellow card) 90+3'	Stadium: Whaddon Road Ground; Attendance: 3,004; Referee: Keith Stroud

17 September 2022 9	Cambridge United	0–3	Barnsley	Cambridge
15:00 BST	Dunk (yellow card) 29'; Smith (yellow card) 89'	Report	Kitching (yellow card) 14' (yellow-red card) 68'; Cole 24', (yellow card) 44'; Thomas (yellow card) 70'; Cundy 76'; Norwood 90+1'	Stadium: Abbey Stadium; Attendance: 6,138; Referee: Declan Bourne

24 September 2022 10	Morecambe	1–2	Cambridge United	Morecambe
15:00 BST	Weir 12' (yellow card) 37'	Report	Lankester 32'; Knibbs 87'	Stadium: Mazuma Stadium; Attendance: 3,917; Referee: Bobby Madden

1 October 2022 11	Cambridge United	0–2	Derby County	Cambridge
15:00 BST		Report	Collins 45', 83'; Osula (yellow card) 90+5'	Stadium: Abbey Stadium; Attendance: 6,813; Referee: Simon Mather

4 October 2022 12	Ipswich Town	3–0	Cambridge United	Ipswich
19:45 BST	John-Jules 72' (yellow card) 90+4'; Edwards 75' 86'	Report		Stadium: Portman Road; Attendance: 26,414; Referee: Robert Lewis

8 October 2022 13	Bristol Rovers	2–1	Cambridge United	Horfield
15:00 BST	Taylor 17' (o.g.); Belshaw (yellow card) 34'; Coburn (yellow card) 47' (goal) 56'; Collins (yellow card) 53'; Loft (yellow card) 86'	Report	Digby (yellow card) 26'; Ironside 35' (pen.); Smith (yellow card) 39'	Stadium: Memorial Stadium; Attendance: 9,007; Referee: Ben Toner

15 October 2022 14	Cambridge United	0–2	Sheffield Wednesday	Cambridge
15:00 BST	Taylor (yellow card) 42'	Report	Gregory 6', 77' (yellow card) 64'; Smith (yellow card) 25'; Vaulks (yellow card) 66'	Stadium: Abbey Stadium; Attendance: 6,418; Referee: Carl Boyeson

22 October 2022 15	Cambridge United	0–1	Port Vale	Cambridge
15:00 BST	Simper (yellow card) 84'	Report	Worrall (yellow card) 27'; Massey (yellow card) 78'; Digby 79' (o.g.); Conlon (yellow card) 90+4'	Stadium: Abbey Stadium; Attendance: 6,218; Referee: Thomas Kirk

25 October 2022 16	Wycombe Wanderers	2–3	Cambridge United	High Wycombe
19:45 BST	Vokes 35'; Wheeler (yellow card) 76'; Kaikai (yellow card) 86'; Wing 90+7'	Report	Knibbs 6'; Lankester 45+1'; Brophy (yellow card) 50'; Jones 77'; Mannion (yellow card) 90+5'	Stadium: Adams Park; Attendance: 4,298; Referee: Peter Wright

29 October 2022 17	Peterborough United	1–0	Cambridge United	Peterborough
15:00 BST	Jones 18' (o.g.); Kent (yellow card) 39'	Report	Simper (yellow card) 41'; Williams (yellow card) 71'; O'Neil (yellow card) 81'	Stadium: Weston Homes Stadium; Attendance: 12,766; Referee: Scott Oldham

12 November 2022 18	Cambridge United	0–0	Bolton Wanderers	Cambridge
15:00 GMT	Jones (yellow card) 14'; Digby (yellow card) 67'	Report	Kachunga (yellow card) 13'; Dempsey (yellow card) 34' (yellow-red card) 75'; Bradley (yellow card) 45'; Jones (yellow card) 70'; Santos (yellow card) 83'	Stadium: Abbey Stadium; Attendance: 6,819; Referee: Darren Drysdale

19 November 2022 19	Cambridge United	0–1	Accrington Stanley	Cambridge
15:00 GMT	Williams (yellow card) 65'	Report	Rodgers 45+2'; Perritt (yellow card) 90+3'	Stadium: Abbey Stadium; Attendance: 6,022; Referee: Christopher Pollard

3 December 2022 20	Forest Green Rovers	2–1	Cambridge United	Nailsworth
13:00 GMT	March 37'; Casey (yellow card) 45+1'; Boyes (yellow card) 78'; O'Keeffe (yellow card) 89' (yellow-red card) 90+3'; Wickham 90+3' (pen.); McGeouch (yellow card) 90+6'	Report	Janneh 89'; Smith (yellow card) 90+2'	Stadium: The Bolt New Lawn; Attendance: 2,257; Referee: James Oldham

10 December 2022 21	Cambridge United	0–0	Plymouth Argyle	Cambridge
15:00 GMT		Report	Butcher (yellow card) 2'; Miller (yellow card) 16'; Cosgrove (yellow card) 31'; Whittaker (yellow card) 52'; Houghton (yellow card) 62'	Stadium: Abbey Stadium; Attendance: 5,546; Referee: Sunny Gill

17 December 2022	Fleetwood Town	Postponed	Cambridge United	Fleetwood
15:00 GMT				Stadium: Highbury Stadium
Note: Fixture was postponed due playing surface deemed unplayable with sections of the pitch being frozen.

26 December 2022 22	Cambridge United	2–1	Shrewsbury Town	Cambridge
15:00 GMT	Okdeina (yellow card) 24'; Tracey 67' (yellow card) 90+5'; Williams (yellow card) 72'; Smith 76'	Report	Pennington (yellow card) 28'; Saydee 64'; Bowman (red card) 90+1'	Stadium: Abbey Stadium; Attendance: 5,875; Referee: Sam Allison

30 December 2022 23	Derby County	1–0	Cambridge United	Derby
19:45 GMT	Sibley (yellow card) 35'; Dobbin 57'; Smith (yellow card) 90+3'	Report	Brophy (yellow card) 76'; Janneh (yellow card) 81'; Williams (yellow card) 89'	Stadium: Pride Park; Attendance: 26,954; Referee: Will Finnie

2 January 2023 24	Sheffield Wednesday	5–0	Cambridge United	Owlerton, Sheffield
15:00 GMT	Windass 7', 70', 80'; Smith 21' (pen.); Palmer 51'	Report	Bennett (yellow card) 20'	Stadium: Hillsborough; Attendance: 24,221; Referee: Andy Haines

7 January 2023 25	Cambridge United	1–2	Bristol Rovers	Cambridge
15:00 GMT	Smith 5'; Seddon (yellow card) 41'; Digby (yellow card) 48'; Lankester (yellow card) 89'	Report	Connolly (yellow card) 12'; Loft (yellow card) 14'; Coburn 21'; Sinclair 29'; Coutts (yellow card) 56'; Marquis (yellow card) 90+1'	Stadium: Abbey Stadium; Attendance: 5,703; Referee: Thomas Parsons

14 January 2023	Cambridge United	Postponed	Morecambe	Cambridge
15:00 GMT				Stadium: Abbey Stadium
Note: Fixture was postponed due to severe winds causing extensive damage to the roof structure.

21 January 2023 26	Shrewsbury Town	5–1	Cambridge United	Shrewsbury
15:00 GMT	Leahy 33' (pen.), 90+1'; Shipley 45+5'; Pennington 57'; Saydee 71'	Report	Worman (yellow card) 12'; Bennett (yellow card) 19'; Digby (yellow card) 22'; Okedina (yellow card) 45+3'; Ironside 69'	Stadium: Montgomery Waters Meadow; Attendance: 5,841; Referee: Thomas Kirk

28 January 2023 27	Lincoln City	0–0	Cambridge United	Lincoln
15:00 GMT	House (yellow card) 35'; Roughan (yellow card) 67'; Bishop (yellow card) 77'	Report	Brophy (yellow card) 59'; Digby (yellow card) 62'; Okenabirhie (yellow card) 74'	Stadium: LNER Stadium; Attendance: 8,266; Referee: Peter Wright

4 February 2023 28	Cambridge United	1–1	Ipswich Town	Cambridge
15:00 GMT	Knibbs 24'; Ironside (penalty missed) 32'; Smith (yellow card) 90'; Digby (yellow card) 90+4'	Report	Edmundson (yellow card) 31'; Morsy (yellow card) 41'; Ladapo 54'	Stadium: Abbey Stadium; Attendance: 7,154; Referee: Sam Barrott

11 February 2023 29	Barnsley	2–0	Cambridge United	Barnsley
15:00 GMT	Digby (yellow card) 47'; Williams (yellow card) 53'; McGrandles (yellow card) 61'; R. Bennett (yellow card) 90+6'	Report	Watters 8' (red card) 37'; Norwood (yellow card) 46'; Williams 64'	Stadium: Oakwell Stadium; Attendance: 10,840; Referee: Ross Joyce

14 February 2023 30	Cambridge United	1–2	Cheltenham Town	Cambridge
19:45 GMT	Ironside 61' (pen.)	Report	Perry (yellow card) 51'; Bonds 57'; Long (yellow card) 61'; Olayinka 79'; May (yellow card) 90+3'	Stadium: Abbey Stadium; Attendance: 5,180; Referee: Andy Woolmer

18 February 2023 31	Cambridge United	1–0	Oxford United	Cambridge
15:00 GMT	Jones 8' (yellow card) 83'; L. Bennett (yellow card) 73'; Ironside (yellow card) 90+2'	Report	Baldock (yellow card) 29'	Stadium: Abbey Stadium; Attendance: 6,613; Referee: Ollie Yates

21 February 2023 32	Fleetwood Town	1–0	Cambridge United	Fleetwood
19:45 GMT	Mendes Gomes (yellow card) 34'; Warrington (yellow card) 78'; Rooney 88'; Vela (yellow card) 90+5'	Report	L. Bennett (yellow card) 44'	Stadium: Highbury Stadium; Attendance: 2,429; Referee: Declan Bourne

25 February 2023 33	Exeter City	2–0	Cambridge United	Exeter
15:00 GMT	Collins 17'; McDonald 53'	Report		Stadium: St James Park; Attendance: 6,400; Referee: Robert Lewis

4 March 2023 34	Cambridge United	0–1	Portsmouth	Cambridge
15:00 GMT	Lankester (yellow card) 36'	Report	Dale (yellow card) 43'; Bishop 65'	Stadium: Abbey Stadium; Attendance: 6,667; Referee: Andrew Kitchen

7 March 2023 35	Cambridge United	1–1	Morecambe	Cambridge
19:45 GMT	Lankester 14'; McGrandles (yellow card) 35'; Jones (yellow card) 76'	Report	Stockton 45+2'	Stadium: Abbey Stadium; Attendance: 5,225; Referee: Paul Howard

11 March 2023 36	Milton Keynes Dons	1–0	Cambridge United	Denbigh
15:00 GMT	Eisa 35'	Report	Jones (yellow card) 37'; Smith (yellow card) 37'; Seddon (yellow card) 81'; Brophy (yellow card) 90+4'	Stadium: Stadium MK; Attendance: 11,298; Referee: Keith Stroud

18 March 2023 37	Cambridge United	1–2	Charlton Athletic	Cambridge
15:00 GMT	R. Bennett (yellow card) 27'; Jones 72'; Seddon (yellow card) 88'	Report	Leaburn 14'; Rak-Sakyi 28'	Stadium: Abbey Stadium; Attendance: 7,068; Referee: Marc Edwards

1 April 2023 38	Port Vale	0–2	Cambridge United	Burslem
15:00 BST	Forrester (yellow card) 19'; Pett (yellow card) 64'; Ojo (yellow card) 80'	Report	Smith 48'; Jones 52'	Stadium: Vale Park; Attendance: 6,730; Referee: Tom Reeves

7 April 2023 39	Cambridge United	2–1	Fleetwood Town	Cambridge
15:00 BST	Lankester 3'; Smith 57' (pen.) (yellow card) 69'; McGrandles (yellow card) 90+2'; Mitov (yellow card) 90+4'; Morrison (yellow card) 90+6'	Report	Rooney (yellow card) 68'; Sarpong-Wiredu (yellow card) 69'; Earl (yellow card) 74'; Quitirna 82'; Marriott (yellow card) 90+6'	Stadium: Abbey Stadium; Attendance: 6,279; Referee: Lee Swabey

10 April 2023 40	Bolton Wanderers	1–1	Cambridge United	Bolton
15:00 BST	Johnston (yellow card) 56'; John 67'; Bradley (yellow card) 71'; Mbete (yellow card) 90+4'	Report	Smith (yellow card) 51' (goal) 90+5'	Stadium: University of Bolton Stadium; Attendance: 24,377; Referee: David Rock

15 April 2023 41	Cambridge United	2–0	Peterborough United	Cambridge
12:30 BST	Dunk 45+2'; Smith 66'; Lankester (yellow card) 71'	Report	Kent (yellow card) 54'; Taylor (yellow card) 90+2'	Stadium: Abbey Stadium; Attendance: 7,711; Referee: Ross Joyce

18 April 2023 42	Cambridge United	1–2	Wycombe Wanderers	Cambridge
19:45 BST	Smith 62'	Report	Tafazolli 33'; Wheeler 44'; Grimmer (yellow card) 53'	Stadium: Abbey Stadium; Attendance: 5,306; Referee: Ben Speedie

22 April 2023 43	Plymouth Argyle	3–1	Cambridge United	Plymouth
15:00 BST	Wright 15'; Mumba (yellow card) 45+3'; Edwards 56'; Ennis 73'	Report	Smith 31'; Brophy (yellow card) 39'; L. Bennett (yellow card) 39'; Morrison (yellow card) 90+5'	Stadium: Home Park; Attendance: 16,326; Referee: Ollie Yates

29 April 2023 44	Accrington Stanley	1–2	Cambridge United	Accrington
15:00 BST	Coyle (yellow card) 73'; Whalley (yellow card) 80'; Pressley 83' (pen.)	Report	Lankester (yellow card) 28'; Dunk 42'; Digby (yellow card) 45+3'; Thomas 65'	Stadium: Wham Stadium; Attendance: 4,484; Referee: Rebecca Welch

3 May 2023 45	Burton Albion	1–0	Cambridge United	Burton upon Trent
19:45 BST	Latty-Fairweather (yellow card) 13'; Helm 28'; Kirk (yellow card) 77'	Report	Morrison (yellow card) 90+2'	Stadium: Pirelli Stadium; Attendance: 3,523 (1,500 away fans); Referee: Andy Haines

7 May 2023 46	Cambridge United	2–0	Forest Green Rovers	Cambridge
12:00 BST	Dunk 25'; Smith 37'	Report	Bunker (yellow card) 74'; Cooper (yellow card) 79'	Stadium: Abbey Stadium; Attendance: 7,493; Referee: Ben Toner

=== FA Cup ===
The U's were drawn away to Curzon Ashton in the first round.

Win Draw Loss Fixtures

6 November 2022 First round	Curzon Ashton	0–0	Cambridge United	Ashton-under-Lyne
14:00 GMT	Peers (yellow card) 60'; Matthews (yellow card) 79'	Report	Dunk (yellow card) 9'; Knibbs (yellow card) 90+4'; Digby (yellow card) 90+5'	Stadium: Tameside Stadium; Attendance: 1,567; Referee: Anthony Backhouse

15 November 2022 First round replay	Cambridge United	0–0 (a.e.t.) (4–2 p)	Curzon Ashton	Cambridge
19:45 GMT	Jones (yellow card) 105'	Report	Hobson (yellow card) 91'; Hayhurst (yellow card) 116'	Stadium: Abbey Stadium; Attendance: 2,222; Referee: Charles Breakspear
	Penalties
	Ironside (penalty scored); Lankester (penalty scored); Knibbs (penalty scored); Digby (penalty scored)		Hancock (penalty missed); Richards (penalty scored); Walker (penalty scored); Dimaio (penalty missed)

26 November 2022 Second round	Cambridge United	1–2	Grimsby Town	Cambridge
15:00 GMT	Digby (yellow card) 42'; Smith 81'	Report	Green (yellow card) 29'; Waterfall (yellow card) 45+2'; Khan 61', 90'; McAtee (yellow card) 83'	Stadium: Abbey Stadium; Attendance: 3,044; Referee: Carl Brook

=== EFL Cup ===
Win Draw Loss Fixtures

Cambridge were drawn at home to Millwall in the first round and to Southampton in the second round.

2 August 2022 First round	Cambridge United	1–0	Millwall	Cambridge
19:45 BST	O'Neil 59'; Janneh (yellow card) 77'	Report	Honeyman (yellow card) 31' (yellow-red card) 61'	Stadium: Abbey Stadium; Attendance: 3,368; Referee: Charles Breakspear

23 August 2022 Second round	Cambridge United	0–3	Southampton	Cambridge
19:45 BST		Report	Adams 16', 55'; Romeu (yellow card) 69'; Lyanco (yellow card) 86'; Ballard 88'; Djenepo (yellow card) 90+2'	Stadium: The Abbey Stadium; Attendance: 6,733; Referee: David Rock

=== EFL Trophy ===
On 20 June, the initial Group stage draw was made, grouping Cambridge United with Ipswich Town and Northampton Town.

Pos	Div	Team	Pld	W	PW	PL	L	GF	GA	GD	Pts	Qualification
1	L1	Ipswich Town	3	2	0	0	1	8	1	+7	6	Advance to Round 2
2	ACA	Arsenal U21	3	2	0	0	1	5	3	+2	6	Advance to Round 2
3	L1	Cambridge United	3	2	0	0	1	3	2	+1	6	
4	L2	Northampton Town	3	0	0	0	3	1	11	−10	0	

Source: EFL.com

Win Draw Loss Fixtures

30 August 2022 Group stage	Cambridge United	0–2	Arsenal U21s	Cambridge
19:00 BST	Lankester (yellow card) 12'	Report	Butler-Oyedeji 26', 57'; Akinola (yellow card) 31'	Stadium: The Abbey Stadium; Attendance: 1,952; Referee: Neil Hair

20 September 2022 Group stage	Northampton Town	0–2	Cambridge United	Northampton
19:00 BST	Smith-Howes (yellow card) 89'	Report	Okenabirhie 68', 77'	Stadium: Sixfields; Attendance: 1,230; Referee: Craig Hicks

18 October 2022 Group stage	Cambridge United	1–0	Ipswich Town	Cambridge
19:00 BST	Taylor (yellow card) 29'; Simper 79'; Brophy (yellow card) 85'	Report	Edwards (yellow card) 7' (yellow-red card) 17'; Woolfenden (yellow card) 45+3'; Chirewa (yellow card) 73'	Stadium: Abbey Stadium; Attendance: 2,548; Referee: Thomas Parsons
