= 2023–24 Cambridge United F.C. season =

112th season in existence of Cambridge United FC

Cambridge United
2023–24 season
- Owner: Paul Barry (70%); Mark Green (20%); Adam Webb (10%)
- Chairman: Shaun Grady
- Head Coach: Mark Bonner (until 29 November); Barry Corr and Kevin Betsy (Interim 29 November – 6 December 2023); Neil Harris (6 December – 21 February); Barry Corr and Kevin Betsy (Interim 21 February – 4 March 2024); Garry Monk (from 4 March)
- Stadium: Abbey Stadium
- League One: 18th
- FA Cup: Third round (eliminated by Blackburn Rovers)
- EFL Cup: First round (eliminated by Sutton United)
- EFL Trophy: Group stage
- Top goalscorer: League: Gassan Ahadme (11); All: Gassan Ahadme (13)
- Highest home attendance: 7,710 (vs Peterborough United, 24 February 2024, EFL League One)
- Lowest home attendance: 5,103 (vs Lincoln City, 28 November 2023, EFL League One)
- Average home league attendance: 6,679
- Biggest win: 4–0 vs Fleetwood Town (H) (2 December 2023); FA Cup
- Biggest defeat: 6–0 vs Lincoln City (A) (12 March 2024); EFL League One

The 2023–24 season is the 112th season in the history of Cambridge United and their third consecutive season in League One. The club are participating in League One, the FA Cup, the EFL Cup, and the 2023–24 EFL Trophy.

== Current squad ==
As of 26 March 2024

| No. | Name | Position | Nationality | Place of birth | Date of birth (age) | Previous club | Date signed | Fee | Contract end |
Goalkeepers
| 1 | Jack Stevens | GK | (England) | Ealing | 2 August 1997 (age 29) | Oxford United | 1 July 2023 | Free | 30 June 2025 |
| 13 | James Holden | GK | (England) | Milton Keynes | 4 September 2001 (age 25) | Reading | 1 July 2022 | Free | 30 June 2024 |
| 25 | Will Mannion | GK | (England) | Hillingdon | 5 May 1998 (age 28) | (Cyprus) Pafos | 3 August 2021 | Free | 30 June 2024 |
| 31 | Louis Chadwick | GK | (England) | | 23 March 2003 (age 23) | St Neots Town | 1 July 2022 | Free | 30 June 2024 |
| 43 | JJ Briggs | GK | (England) | | | Academy | 1 July 2023 | Trainee | 30 June 2025 |
Defenders
| 2 | Liam Bennett | RB | (England) | | 30 November 2001 (age 24) | St Neots Town | 1 July 2021 | Free | 30 June 2024 |
| 3 | Danny Andrew | LB | (England) | Holbeach | 23 December 1990 (age 35) | Fleetwood Town | 1 July 2023 | Undisclosed | 30 June 2024 |
| 5 | Michael Morrison | CB | (England) | Bury St Edmunds | 3 March 1988 (age 38) | Portsmouth | 26 January 2023 | Free | 30 June 2024 |
| 6 | Ryan Bennett | CB | (England) | Orsett | 6 March 1990 (age 36) | Swansea City | 6 January 2023 | Free | 30 June 2024 |
| 11 | Harrison Dunk | LB | (England) | Hammersmith | 25 October 1990 (age 36) | Bromley | 1 July 2011 | Free | 30 June 2024 |
| 15 | Jubril Okedina | CB | (England) | Woolwich | 26 October 2000 (age 26) | Tottenham Hotspur | 5 August 2021 | Undisclosed | 30 June 2025 |
| 16 | Zeno Ibsen Rossi | CB | (England) | Streatham | 28 October 2000 (age 26) | Bournemouth | 18 July 2022 | Undisclosed | 30 June 2025 |
| 20 | Brandon Haunstrup | LB | (England) | Waterlooville | 26 October 1996 (age 30) | (Scotland) Kilmarnock | 6 July 2022 | Free | 30 June 2024 |
| 26 | James Gibbons | RB | (England) | Trentham | 16 March 1998 (age 28) | Bristol Rovers | 30 January 2024 | Loan | 31 May 2024 |
| 28 | Mamadou Jobe | CB | (England) | Harlow | 2 March 2003 (age 23) | Academy | 1 July 2021 | Trainee | 30 June 2024 |
| 32 | Harvey Beckett | CB | (England) | | 30 September 2003 (age 23) | Academy | 1 July 2021 | Trainee | 30 June 2024 |
| 42 | Ty Ewens-Findlay | CB | (England) | | | Academy | 1 July 2023 | Trainee | 30 June 2025 |
| 44 | Patrick Staszewski | CB | (England) | | | Academy | 6 November 2023 | Trainee | 30 June 2024 |
Midfielders
| 4 | Paul Digby | DM | (England) | Sheffield | 2 February 1995 (age 31) | Stevenage | 21 July 2020 | Free | 30 June 2025 |
| 7 | James Brophy | LM | (England) | Brent | 25 July 1994 (age 32) | Leyton Orient | 1 July 2021 | Free | 30 June 2024 |
| 8 | George Thomas | AM | (Wales) | (England) Leicester | 24 March 1997 (age 29) | Queens Park Rangers | 31 January 2023 | Free | 30 June 2025 |
| 19 | Adam May | CM | (England) | Southampton | 6 December 1997 (age 28) | Portsmouth | 4 September 2020 | Free | 30 June 2025 |
| 22 | Lewis Simper | CM | (England) | Cambridge | 3 September 2001 (age 25) | Academy | 3 January 2020 | Trainee | 30 June 2025 |
| 24 | Jordan Cousins | CM | (Jamaica) | (England) Greenwich | 6 March 1994 (age 32) | Wigan Athletic | 13 July 2023 | Free | 30 June 2024 |
| 39 | George Scales | CM | (England) | | 4 August 2006 (age 20) | Academy | 6 November 2023 | Trainee | 30 June 2024 |
| 40 | Ronan Ismaili | CM | (England) | | | Academy | 6 November 2023 | Trainee | 30 June 2024 |
| 41 | Amaru Kaunda | CM | (England) | | | Academy | 6 November 2023 | Trainee | 30 June 2024 |
Forwards
| 9 | Fejiri Okenabirhie | CF | (Nigeria) | (England) Hendon | 25 February 1996 (age 30) | Doncaster Rovers | 29 July 2022 | Free | 30 June 2024 |
| 10 | Jack Lankester | RW | (England) | Bury St Edmunds | 19 January 2000 (age 26) | Ipswich Town | 1 July 2021 | Undisclosed | 30 June 2025 |
| 14 | Sullay Kaikai | LW | (Sierra Leone) | (England) Southwark | 26 August 1995 (age 31) | Milton Keynes Dons | 24 July 2023 | Free | 30 June 2024 |
| 17 | Saikou Janneh | CF | (The Gambia) | Gunjur | 11 January 2000 (age 26) | Bristol City | 1 July 2022 | Undisclosed | 30 June 2024 |
| 18 | Lyle Taylor | CF | (Montserrat) | (England) Greenwich | 29 March 1990 (age 36) | Wycombe Wanderers | 12 January 2024 | Free | 30 June 2024 |
| 21 | Elias Kachunga | CF | (Democratic Republic of the Congo) | (Germany) Haan | 22 April 1992 (age 34) | Bolton Wanderers | 1 August 2023 | Free | 30 June 2024 |
| 23 | Gassan Ahadme | CF | (Morocco) | (Spain) Vic | 17 November 2000 (age 25) | Ipswich Town | 1 July 2023 | Loan | 31 May 2024 |
| 27 | Macauley Bonne | CF | (Zimbabwe) | (England) Ipswich | 26 October 1995 (age 31) | Gillingham | 1 February 2024 | Loan | 31 May 2024 |
| 29 | Kai Yearn | AM | (England) | Cambridge | 21 May 2005 (age 21) | Academy | 1 July 2022 | Trainee | 30 June 2024 |
| 30 | Glenn McConnell | FW | (Republic of Ireland) | | 26 April 2005 (age 21) | Academy | 1 July 2022 | Trainee | 30 June 2024 |
| 33 | Saleem Akanbi | FW | (England) | | 29 April 2004 (age 22) | Academy | 1 July 2022 | Trainee | 30 June 2024 |
| 34 | Brandon Njoku | CF | (England) | Wembley | 29 January 2005 (age 21) | Academy | 1 July 2023 | Trainee | 30 June 2024 |

== Transfers ==
=== In ===
| Date | Pos | Player | Transferred from | Fee | Ref |
|---|---|---|---|---|---|
| 1 July 2023 | LB | Danny Andrew (ENG) | Fleetwood Town | Undisclosed | |
| 1 July 2023 | GK | Jack Stevens (ENG) | Oxford United | Free transfer | |
| 13 July 2023 | CM | Jordan Cousins (JAM) | Wigan Athletic | Free transfer | |
| 24 July 2023 | LW | Sullay Kaikai (SLE) | Milton Keynes Dons | Free transfer | |
| 1 August 2023 | CF | Elias Kachunga (COD) | Bolton Wanderers | Free transfer | |
| 12 January 2024 | CF | Lyle Taylor (MSR) | Wycombe Wanderers | Free transfer | |

=== Out ===
| Date | Pos | Player | Transferred to | Fee | Ref |
|---|---|---|---|---|---|
| 30 June 2023 | CF | Joe Ironside (ENG) | Doncaster Rovers | Released | |
| 30 June 2023 | CB | Lloyd Jones (ENG) | Charlton Athletic | Released | |
| 30 June 2023 | CF | Harvey Knibbs (ENG) | Reading | Released | |
| 30 June 2023 | GK | Dimitar Mitov (BUL) | St Johnstone (SCO) | Released | |
| 30 June 2023 | DM | Liam O'Neil (ENG) | Boreham Wood | Released | |
| 30 June 2023 | CF | Sam Smith (ENG) | Reading | Released | |
| 30 June 2023 | CB | Greg Taylor (ENG) | Woking | End of Contract | |
| 30 June 2023 | RW | Shilow Tracey (ENG) | Crewe Alexandra | Released | |
| 30 June 2023 | RB | George Williams (ENG) | Mansfield Town | Released | |
| 30 June 2023 | CM | Ben Worman (ENG) | Cork City (IRL) | Released | |

=== Loaned in ===
| Date | Pos | Player | Loaned from | On loan until | Ref |
|---|---|---|---|---|---|
| 1 July 2023 | CF | Gassan Ahadme (MAR) | Ipswich Town | End of season | |
| 1 September 2023 | CF | John-Kymani Gordon (ENG) | Crystal Palace | 17 January 2024 (Note: On 17 January, Gordon returned to Crystal Palace from his season-long loan early.) | |
| 30 January 2024 | RB | James Gibbons (ENG) | Bristol Rovers | End of season | |
| 1 February 2024 | CF | Macauley Bonne (ZIM) | Gillingham | End of season | |

=== Loaned out ===
| Date | Pos | Player | Loaned to | Until | Ref |
|---|---|---|---|---|---|
| 5 August 2023 | CM | George Hoddle (ENG) | St Albans City | End of season | |
| 9 September 2023 | AM | Kai Yearn (ENG) | King's Lynn Town | 7 October 2023 | |
| 21 October 2023 | GK | James Holden (ENG) | Welling United | 18 November 2023 | |
| 16 November 2023 | CB | Mamadou Jobe (ENG) | Gateshead | 27 March 2024 (Note: On 9 January, Jobe's loan at Gateshead was extended by a further month.) (Note: On 17 February, Jobe's loan at Gateshead was extended again, until the end of season.) (Note: On 27 March, Jobe was then recalled from his loan at Gateshead.) | |
| 29 March 2024 | CF | Brandon Njoku (ENG) | Peterborough Sports | End of season | |

== Pre-season and friendlies ==
On 5 June, Cambridge United announced their first two pre-season friendlies, against Ipswich Town and Barnet. A third friendly, against St Albans City was also confirmed. Three behind-closed-doors fixtures were also included in the pre-season preparations, against Tottenham Hotspur Under-21s, Gillingham and Cardiff City.

Win Draw Loss Fixtures

| 7 July 2023 Friendly | Cardiff City | 1–1 | Cambridge United | Behind-closed-doors |
| 13:00 BST | Robinson 70' | Report | Ahadme 89' |

| 11 July 2023 Friendly | Tottenham Hotspur U21 | 1–1 | Cambridge United | Behind-closed-doors |
| TBA BST | Scarlett | Report |

| 15 July 2023 Friendly | St Albans City | 1–3 | Cambridge United | St Albans |
| 13:00 BST | Trialist 35' | Report | Dunk 13'; Njoku 82'; Janneh 86' | Stadium: Clarence Park |

| 22 July 2023 Friendly | Cambridge United | 2–1 | Ipswich Town | Cambridge |
| 12:00 BST | Janneh 28'; Morrison 89' | Report | Davis 2' | Stadium: Abbey Stadium; Attendance: 2,936 (517 away fans); Referee: John Brooks |

| 25 July 2023 Friendly | Cambridge United | 4–0 | Gillingham | Cambridge |
| 14:00 BST | Brophy 2'; Okenabirhie 22', 58' (pen.); Cousins 43' | Report | | Stadium: Abbey Stadium; Attendance: 0 (Behind-closed-doors) |

| 29 July 2023 Friendly | Barnet | 2–0 | Cambridge United | Canons Park |
| 15:00 BST | Collinge 24'; Kabamba 30' | Report | | Stadium: The Hive Stadium |

== Competitions ==
=== Overall record ===
| Competition | First match | Last match | Starting round | Final position | Record | | | | | | | |
| Competition | First match | Last match | Starting round | Final position | Pld | W | D | L | GF | GA | GD | Win % |
|---|---|---|---|---|---|---|---|---|---|---|---|---|
| League One | 5 August 2023 | 27 April 2024 | Matchday 1 | 18th | 46 | 12 | 12 | 22 | 39 | 61 | −22 | 26.09 |
| FA Cup | 4 November 2023 | 6 January 2024 | First round | Third round | 3 | 2 | 0 | 1 | 8 | 6 | +2 | 66.67 |
| EFL Cup | 8 August 2023 | 8 August 2023 | First round | First round | 1 | 0 | 1 | 0 | 2 | 2 | +0 | 0.00 |
| EFL Trophy | 12 September 2023 | 7 November 2023 | Group stage | Group stage | 3 | 1 | 0 | 2 | 5 | 5 | +0 | 33.33 |
| Total | | | | | 53 | 15 | 13 | 25 | 54 | 74 | −20 | 28.30 |

Last updated: 27 April 2024
Source: Soccerway

=== League One ===
==== League table ====
| Pos | Team | Pld | W | D | L | GF | GA | GD | Pts | Promotion, qualification or relegation |
|---|---|---|---|---|---|---|---|---|---|---|
| 15 | Bristol Rovers | 46 | 16 | 9 | 21 | 52 | 68 | −16 | 57 | |
| 16 | Charlton Athletic | 46 | 11 | 20 | 15 | 64 | 65 | −1 | 53 | |
| 17 | Reading | 46 | 16 | 11 | 19 | 68 | 70 | −2 | 53 (Note: On 16 August 2023, Reading were deducted one point for failing to pay players on time and in full on three occasions in the 2022–23 season. Another 3-point deduction was applied on 13 September, for failing to deposit wages on time. Another 2-point deduction was applied on 27 February, due to late HMRC payments.) | |
| 18 | Cambridge United | 46 | 12 | 12 | 22 | 39 | 61 | −22 | 48 | |
| 19 | Shrewsbury Town | 46 | 13 | 9 | 24 | 35 | 67 | −32 | 48 | |
| 20 | Burton Albion | 46 | 12 | 10 | 24 | 39 | 67 | −28 | 46 | |
| 21 | Cheltenham Town (R) | 46 | 12 | 8 | 26 | 41 | 65 | −24 | 44 | Relegation to EFL League Two |

Source: EFL Official Website
Rules for classification: 1) Points; 2) Goal difference; 3) Number of goals scored; 4) Head-to-head results; 5) Wins; 6) Away goals; 7) Penalty points (sec 9.5); 8) 12-point sending off offences
(R) Relegated

==== Results summary ====
| Overall | | | | | | | | Home | | | | | | Away | | | | | |
| Pld | W | D | L | GF | GA | GD | Pts | W | D | L | GF | GA | GD | W | D | L | GF | GA | GD |
|---|---|---|---|---|---|---|---|---|---|---|---|---|---|---|---|---|---|---|---|
| 46 | 12 | 12 | 22 | 39 | 61 | −22 | 48 | 8 | 7 | 8 | 22 | 24 | −2 | 4 | 5 | 14 | 17 | 37 | −20 |

Last updated: 27 April 2024.
Source: Soccerway

==== Results by round ====
| Round | 1 | 2 | 3 | 4 | 5 | 6 | 8 | 9 | 10 | 11 | 12 | 13 | 14 | 15 | 16 | 7^{1} | 17 | 19 | 20 | 21 | 22 | 23 | 24 | 26 | 28 | 29 | 30 | 31 | 32 | 33 | 34 | 18^{2} | 35 | 25^{3} | 36 | 37 | 38 | 39 | 41 | 42 | 43 | 44 | 27^{4} | 45 | 40^{5} | 46 |
|---|---|---|---|---|---|---|---|---|---|---|---|---|---|---|---|---|---|---|---|---|---|---|---|---|---|---|---|---|---|---|---|---|---|---|---|---|---|---|---|---|---|---|---|---|---|---|
| Ground | H | A | H | H | A | H | A | H | A | H | A | H | A | H | H | A | A | A | H | A | H | H | A | H | H | A | H | A | H | A | A | H | H | A | A | H | A | A | A | H | A | H | A | H | H | A |
| Result | W | W | L | W | L | W | L | D | D | L | L | D | L | D | W | D | L | L | L | D | W | W | L | L | W | D | D | W | L | L | W | L | L | L | L | D | L | L | W | W | L | D | L | L | D | D |
| Position | 5 | 2 | 5 | 1 | 9 | 6 | 10 | 10 | 13 | 15 | 15 | 17 | 18 | 17 | 14 | 12 | 15 | 16 | 18 | 18 | 16 | 13 | 14 | 18 | 16 | 14 | 16 | 14 | 16 | 17 | 16 | 17 | 17 | 17 | 19 | 20 | 20 | 20 | 19 | 19 | 19 | 18 | 19 | 19 | 19 | 18 |

Updated to match(es) played on 27 April 2024. Source: Soccerway
A = Away; H = Home; W = Win; D = Draw; L = Loss; P = Postponed
Notes:
- ^{1} Matchday 7 (vs Wycombe Wanderers) was postponed due to the international call-ups.
- ^{2} Matchday 18 (vs Bolton Wanderers) was postponed due to the international call-ups.
- ^{3} Matchday 25 (vs Stevenage) was postponed due to a local power network failure.
- ^{4} Matchday 27 (vs Bristol Rovers) was postponed due to FA Cup involvements.
- ^{5} Matchday 40 (vs Wycombe Wanderers) was postponed due to the international call-ups.

==== Matches ====
On 22 June, the EFL League One fixtures were released.

Win Draw Loss Fixtures

| 5 August 2023 1 | Cambridge United | 2–0 | Oxford United | Cambridge |
| 15:00 BST | Brophy (yellow card) 10'; Lankester 15' (yellow card) 43'; Ahadme 28'; Janneh (yellow card) 44'; Kachunga (yellow card) 90+5' | | Rodrigues (yellow card) 12' | Stadium: Abbey Stadium; Attendance: 7,435; Referee: Sunny Gill |

| 12 August 2023 2 | Fleetwood Town | 0–2 | Cambridge United | Fleetwood |
| 15:00 BST | Robertson (yellow card) 14'; Mayor (yellow card) 26'; Vela (yellow card) 30' | Report | Brophy (yellow card) 28'; Digby (yellow card) 30' (goal) 31'; Ahadme 59'; Lankester (yellow card) 73' | Stadium: Highbury Stadium; Attendance: 3,316; Referee: Seb Stockbridge |

| 15 August 2023 3 | Cambridge United | 1–2 | Stevenage | Cambridge |
| 19:45 BST | Kachunga 80' | Report | Roberts 27'; Thompson (yellow card) 32'; Butler (yellow card) 68'; Reid 82' (yellow card) 83' | Stadium: Abbey Stadium; Attendance: 7,529; Referee: Will Finnie |

| 19 August 2023 4 | Cambridge United | 2–0 | Bristol Rovers | Cambridge |
| 15:00 BST | Okenabirhie 79'; Morrison (yellow card) 88'; Kaikai 90+6' | | Taylor (yellow card) 13'; Evans (yellow card) 45'; Hoole (yellow card) 70' | Stadium: Abbey Stadium; Attendance: 6,390; Referee: John Busby |

| 26 August 2023 5 | Leyton Orient | 2–0 | Cambridge United | Leyton |
| 15:00 BST | Galbraith (yellow card) 15'; Forde 29'; Graham (yellow card) 32'; Archibald 57' (yellow card) 82'; James (yellow card) 85' | Report | Andrew (yellow card) 45'; Ahadme (yellow card) 49'; Simper (yellow card) 68'; Okenabirhie (yellow card) 86' | Stadium: Brisbane Road; Attendance: 8,266; Referee: Stephen Martin |

| 4 September 2023 6 | Cambridge United | 1–0 | Reading | Cambridge |
| 20:00 BST | Morrison (yellow card) 65'; Okenabirhie 83' | Report | Dean (yellow card) 27'; Hutchinson (yellow card) 68'; Savage (yellow card) 75' | Stadium: Abbey Stadium; Attendance: 6,789; Referee: Darren Drysdale |
Note: Live on Sky Sports

| 16 September 2023 8 | Wigan Athletic | 2–1 | Cambridge United | Wigan |
| 15:00 BST | Rekik (yellow card) 33'; Adeeko (yellow card) 44'; Humphrys 57'; Aasgaard 62' | Report | Okenabirhie 76' (pen.) | Stadium: DW Stadium; Attendance: 10,078; Referee: Adam Herczeg |

| 23 September 2023 9 | Cambridge United | 1–1 | Port Vale | Cambridge |
| 15:00 BST | Okenabirhie 66' (penalty missed) 90' | Report | Garrity 20'; Balmer (yellow card) 25'; Wilson (yellow card) 41'; Iacovitti (yellow card) 89'; Grant (yellow card) 90+1' | Stadium: Abbey Stadium; Attendance: 6,905; Referee: Christopher Pollard |

| 30 September 2023 10 | Derby County | 0–0 | Cambridge United | Derby |
| 15:00 BST | Nyambe (yellow card) 75'; Collins (yellow card) 83' | Report | Gordon (yellow card) 72'; Bennett (yellow card) 85' | Stadium: Pride Park Stadium; Attendance: 26,122; Referee: Ollie Yates |

| 3 October 2023 11 | Cambridge United | 0–4 | Barnsley | Cambridge |
| 19:45 BST | Morrison (yellow card) 59'; Lankester (yellow card) 63' | Report | Cadden 7' (yellow card) 79' de Gevigney 33'; Watters 59'; Styles (yellow card) 67'; Russell 83' | Stadium: Abbey Stadium; Attendance: 5,493; Referee: Thomas Parsons |

| 9 October 2023 12 | Burton Albion | 2–1 | Cambridge United | Burton upon Trent |
| 20:00 BST | Walker 10'; Oshilaja 31'; Baah (yellow card) 53'; Bennett (yellow card) 90' | Report | Okenabirhie 67' | Stadium: Pirelli Stadium; Attendance: 2,296; Referee: Ben Speedie |

| 14 October 2023 13 | Cambridge United | 1–1 | Shrewsbury Town | Cambridge |
| 15:00 BST | Digby (yellow card) 38'; Gordon (yellow card) 51'; Morrison 69' | Report | Benning (yellow card) 44'; Perry 88' | Stadium: Abbey Stadium; Attendance: 6,252; Referee: Scott Tallis |

| 21 October 2023 14 | Cheltenham Town | 1–0 | Cambridge United | Cheltenham |
| 15:00 BST | Sercombe 5'; Goodwin (yellow card) 64'; Bonds (yellow card) 66'; Freestone (yellow card) 85'; Williams (yellow card) 90+2' | Report | R.Bennett (yellow card) 54' | Stadium: Whaddon Road; Attendance: 3,900; Referee: Edward Duckworth |

| 24 October 2023 15 | Cambridge United | 0–0 | Portsmouth | Cambridge |
| 19:45 BST | Digby (yellow card) 76' | Report | Kamara (yellow card) 67'; Morrell (yellow card) 68'; Sparkes (yellow card) 77'; Shaughnessy | Stadium: Abbey Stadium; Attendance: 6,627; Referee: Declan Bourne |

| 28 October 2023 16 | Cambridge United | 1–0 | Carlisle United | Cambridge |
| 15:00 BST | Lankester (yellow card) 30'; R.Bennett (yellow card) 37'; Thomas 73' | Report | Armer (yellow card) 47' (yellow-red card) 83'; McCalmont (red card) 90+2' | Stadium: Abbey Stadium; Attendance: 6,513; Referee: Sam Purkiss |

| 31 October 2023 7 | Wycombe Wanderers | 0–0 | Cambridge United | High Wycombe |
| 19:45 GMT | Leahy (yellow card) 90'; De Barr (yellow card) 90+2' | | Andrew (yellow card) 41'; Morrison (yellow card) 62'; Lankester (yellow card) 83' | Stadium: Adams Park; Attendance: 3,879; Referee: Will Finnie |
Note: Fixture was previously postponed due to international call-ups within the Wycombe squad.

| 11 November 2023 17 | Peterborough United | 5–0 | Cambridge United | Peterborough |
| 12:00 GMT | Mason-Clark 34', 37'; Poku 40', 54'; Bennett 86' (o.g.) | Report | | Stadium: London Road Stadium; Attendance: 11,641; Referee: Scott Oldham |

| 25 November 2023 19 | Northampton Town | 2–1 | Cambridge United | Northampton |
| 15:00 GMT | McWilliams (yellow card) 42'; Bowie 49'; Hoskins 55' | Report | Brophy (yellow card) 40'; Ahadme 77'; Digby (yellow card) 79' (red card) 80'; Andrew (yellow card) 90' | Stadium: Sixfields Stadium; Attendance: 6,929; Referee: Lewis Smith |

| 28 November 2023 20 | Cambridge United | 0–3 | Lincoln City | Cambridge |
| 19:45 GMT | Ahadme (yellow card) 9'; Cousins (yellow card) 15' | Report | Mandroiu 16' (pen.); Duffy 32'; Vale (yellow card) 77' (goal) 85'; Mitchell (yellow card) 88' | Stadium: Abbey Stadium; Attendance: 5,103; Referee: David Rock |

| 9 December 2023 21 | Charlton Athletic | 2–2 | Cambridge United | Charlton |
| 15:00 GMT | May 52'; Campbell 61' | Report | Ahadme 87', 90+6' (pen.) | Stadium: The Valley; Attendance: 13,373; Referee: Thomas Kirk |

| 16 December 2023 22 | Cambridge United | 2–1 | Blackpool | Cambridge |
| 15:00 GMT | Kachunga 32' (yellow card) 70'; Andrew (yellow card) 34'; Ahadme 44' (pen.); Digby (yellow card) 56' (red card) 79'; Stevens (yellow card) 83'; Brophy (yellow card) 90' | Report | Beesley (yellow card) 17'; Rhodes 25'; Grimshaw (yellow card) 43'; Norburn (yellow card) 78' | Stadium: Abbey Stadium; Attendance: 6,042; Referee: Charles Breakspear |

| 22 December 2023 23 | Cambridge United | 2–0 | Exeter City | Cambridge |
| 19:45 GMT | Ahadme 17' (pen.); Kachunga 84' | Report | Tom Carroll (yellow card) 20'; Cole (yellow card) 45+2' | Stadium: Abbey Stadium; Attendance: 6,157; Referee: Darren Drysdale |

| 26 December 2023 24 | Oxford United | 2–1 | Cambridge United | Oxford |
| 15:00 GMT | Brown (yellow card) 44' (goal) 90+5'; Goodrham 54'; Brannagan (yellow card) 72' | Report | Cousins 30'; Thomas (yellow card) 53'; May (yellow card) 74'; Stevens (yellow card) 90+2'; Brophy (yellow card) 90+4' | Stadium: Kassam Stadium; Attendance: 10,407; Referee: Tom Nield |

| 1 January 2024 26 | Cambridge United | 0–2 | Leyton Orient | Cambridge |
| 15:00 GMT | Lankester (yellow card) 12' | Report | Beckles (yellow card) 25'; Archibald (yellow card) 39'; James (yellow card) 44'; Brown 54'; Agyei 57'; Galbraith (yellow card) 68'; Forde (yellow card) 84' | Stadium: Abbey Stadium; Attendance: 7,210; Referee: Carl Brook |

| 13 January 2024 28 | Cambridge United | 2–1 | Fleetwood Town | Cambridge |
| 15:00 GMT | Taylor 71'; Kaikai 90+1' | Report | Dolan (yellow card) 16'; Omochere 77'; Heneghan (yellow card) 83' | Stadium: Abbey Stadium; Attendance: 6,555; Referee: Scott Tallis |

| 20 January 2024 29 | Exeter City | 0–0 | Cambridge United | Exeter |
| 15:00 GMT | Purrington (yellow card) 39'; Niskanen (yellow card) 45+1' | Report | Andrew (yellow card) 27'; Taylor (yellow card) 31'; Digby (yellow card) 50'; Kachunga (yellow card) 56' | Stadium: St James Park; Attendance: 6,343; Referee: Scott Simpson |

| 27 January 2024 30 | Cambridge United | 0–0 | Burton Albion | Cambridge |
| 15:00 GMT | Morrison (yellow card) 45+1'; Andrew (yellow card) 56'; Taylor (yellow card) 90+4'; Lankester (yellow card) 90+10' | Report | Moon (yellow card) 20'; Seddon (yellow card) 64' (yellow-red card) 64'; Oshilaja (yellow card) 69'; Carayol (yellow card) 74'; Bennett (yellow card) 87'; Crocombe (yellow card) 90+7' | Stadium: Abbey Stadium; Attendance: 6,755; Referee: Edward Duckworth |

| 3 February 2024 31 | Shrewsbury Town | 1–2 | Cambridge United | Shrewsbury |
| 15:00 GMT | Udoh 12'; Bloxham (yellow card) 90+1' (yellow-red card) 90+4'; Pierre (yellow card) 90+8' | Report | Taylor 14', 46'; Thomas (yellow card) 87'; L. Bennett (yellow card) 90' | Stadium: New Meadow; Attendance: 6,795; Referee: Craig Hicks |

| 10 February 2024 32 | Cambridge United | 0–1 | Cheltenham Town | Cambridge |
| 15:00 GMT | R. Bennett (yellow card) 36'; Cousins (yellow card) 88'; Thomas (yellow card) 90' | Report | Taylor (yellow card) 54' (goal) 65'; Pett (yellow card) 70'; Nuttall (yellow card) 80' | Stadium: Abbey Stadium; Attendance: 7,047; Referee: Ben Atkinson |

| 13 February 2024 33 | Portsmouth | 3–1 | Cambridge United | Portsmouth |
| 19:45 GMT | Norris (yellow card) 39'; Yengi 44' (pen.); Peart-Harris 59'; Kamara 71'; Sparkes (yellow card) 89' | Report | Bennett (yellow card) 5'; Andrew 38'; Lankester (yellow card) 44'; Stevens (yellow card) 44'; Gibbons (yellow card) 45+1'; Morrison (yellow card) 61' | Stadium: Fratton Park; Attendance: 19,445; Referee: Sam Allison |

| 17 February 2024 34 | Carlisle United | 0–4 | Cambridge United | Carlisle |
| 15:00 GMT | Mellish (yellow card) 45+4'; Butterworth (yellow card) 68' | Report | Kaikai 14'; Taylor (yellow card) 45+4'; Lavelle 69' (o.g.); Kachunga 72'; R. Bennett 83' | Stadium: Brunton Park; Attendance: 6,877; Referee: Scott Jackson |

| 20 February 2024 18 | Cambridge United | 1–2 | Bolton Wanderers | Cambridge |
| 19:45 GMT | Toal 8' (o.g.); Cousins (yellow card) 40'; Kachunga (yellow card) 41'; Morrison (yellow card) 63'; Taylor (red card) 90+1' | Report | Sheehan (yellow card) 22'; Maghoma 52'; Mendes Gomes 63'; Iredale (yellow card) 90+1' | Stadium: Abbey Stadium; Attendance: 6,525; Referee: David Rock |
Note: Fixture was originally scheduled for 18 November and 6 February, but was postponed due to international call-ups within the Bolton squad. and abandoned due to extreme weather conditions respectively.

| 24 February 2024 35 | Cambridge United | 0–1 | Peterborough United | Cambridge |
| 12:00 GMT | Lankester (yellow card) 17'; Morrison (yellow card) 58'; R. Bennett (yellow card) 65'; Andrew (yellow card) 79' | Report | Mason-Clark 55'; Knight (yellow card) 70'; Katongo (yellow card) 90+4' | Stadium: Abbey Stadium; Attendance: 7,710; Referee: Charles Breakspear |

| 27 February 2024 25 | Stevenage | 1–0 | Cambridge United | Stevenage |
| 19:45 GMT | Roberts 35'; Forster-Caskey (yellow card) 45'; Reid (yellow card) 66' | Report | Cousins (yellow card) 43' | Stadium: Broadhall Way; Attendance: 6,553; Referee: Lee Swabey |
Note: Fixture was originally scheduled for 29 December, but was postponed due to a local power network failure.

| 2 March 2024 36 | Bolton Wanderers | 2–0 | Cambridge United | Horwich |
| 15:00 GMT | Adeboyejo (yellow card) 27'; Thomason 35' (yellow card) 70'; Dacres-Cogley (yellow card) 46'; Collins 66'; Dempsey (yellow card) 82' | Report | Kaikai (yellow card) 41'; Morrison (yellow card) 66' | Stadium: Toughsheet Community Stadium; Attendance: 20,246; Referee: Ollie Yates |

| 9 March 2024 37 | Cambridge United | 1–1 | Northampton Town | Cambridge |
| 15:00 GMT | Kachunga 16'; Digby (yellow card) 81' | Report | Guthrie 82' | Stadium: Abbey Stadium; Attendance: 6,942; Referee: Declan Bourne |

| 12 March 2024 38 | Lincoln City | 6–0 | Cambridge United | Lincoln |
| 19:45 GMT | Moylan 3', 25'; Taylor 48', 74' (yellow card) 90+7'; Eyoma 85'; Duffy 86' (yellow card) 90+1' | Report | Andrew (yellow card) 80'; Brophy (yellow card) 83' | Stadium: Sincil Bank; Attendance: 7,316; Referee: Scott Oldham |

| 16 March 2024 39 | Reading | 4–0 | Cambridge United | Reading |
| 15:00 GMT | Smith 11'; Azeez 45+2'; Wing 62'; Ehibhatiomhan 85' | Report | Bennett (yellow card) 84' | Stadium: Madejski Stadium; Attendance: 15,644; Referee: Ben Speedie |

| 29 March 2024 41 | Barnsley | 0–2 | Cambridge United | Barnsley |
| 15:00 GMT | McCart (yellow card) 46'; Earl (yellow card) 69' | Report | de Gevigney 13' (o.g.); Jobe (yellow card) 69'; L. Bennett (yellow card) 70'; Ahadme 72' | Stadium: Oakwell; Attendance: 13,363; Referee: Simon Mather |

| 1 April 2024 42 | Cambridge United | 3–1 | Wigan Athletic | Cambridge |
| 15:00 BST | Ahadme 11', 57'; R. Bennett (yellow card) 33'; Mannion (yellow card) 59'; Andrew 83' | Report | Shaw (yellow card) 31'; Magennis (penalty missed); Smith (yellow card) 45+1'; Godo 65' | Stadium: Abbey Stadium; Attendance: 6,418; Referee: Anthony Backhouse |

| 6 April 2024 43 | Blackpool | 1–0 | Cambridge United | Blackpool |
| 15:00 BST | Carey 30' | Report | R. Bennett (yellow card) 32'; Digby (yellow card) 45+2' | Stadium: Bloomfield Road; Attendance: 10,187; Referee: Dean Whitestone |

| 13 April 2024 44 | Cambridge United | 1–1 | Charlton Athletic | Cambridge |
| 15:00 BST | Bonne 50' | Report | Wickham 23'; Coventry (yellow card) 33'; Bakinson (yellow card) 35' | Stadium: Abbey Stadium; Attendance: 7,484; Referee: Darren Drysdale |

| 16 April 2024 27 | Bristol Rovers | 1–0 | Cambridge United | Horfield |
| 19:45 BST | Martin (penalty missed) 87' | Report | | Stadium: Memorial Stadium; Attendance: 6,526; Referee: Daniel Middleton |
Note: Fixture was originally scheduled for 6 January, but was postponed due to FA Cup involvement.

| 20 April 2024 45 | Cambridge United | 0–1 | Derby County | Cambridge |
| 15:00 BST | Andrew (yellow card) 41'; Digby (yellow card) 45' | Report | Sibley (yellow card) 24'; Mendez-Laing 39'; Adams (yellow card) 45' | Stadium: Abbey Stadium; Attendance: 7,649; Referee: Paul Howard |

| 23 April 2024 40 | Cambridge United | 1–1 | Wycombe Wanderers | Cambridge |
| 19:45 BST | Ahadme 71'; Okedina (yellow card) 81'; Gibbons (yellow card) 90+7' | Report | Leahy 83' | Stadium: Abbey Stadium; Attendance: 6,081; Referee: Will Finnie |
Note: Fixture was originally scheduled for 23 March, but was postponed due to international call-ups.

| 27 April 2024 46 | Port Vale | 0–0 | Cambridge United | Burslem |
| 12:30 BST | Weir (yellow card) 35'; Smith (yellow card) 74' | | Gibbons (yellow card) 29'; Bennett (yellow card) 37'; Ahadme (yellow card) 39'; Okedina (yellow card) 86' | Stadium: Vale Park; Referee: Ross Joyce |

=== FA Cup ===
Cambridge were drawn at home to Bracknell Town in the first round, to Fleetwood Town in the second round and away to Blackburn Rovers in the third round.

Win Draw Loss Fixtures

| 4 November 2023 First Round | Cambridge United | 2–1 | Bracknell Town | Cambridge |
| 15:00 GMT | May (yellow card) 13'; Okenabirhie 27'; Osu 48' (o.g.) | Report | Legg (yellow card) 5'; Harrison (yellow card) 15'; Harris (yellow card) 68' (goal) 88'; George (yellow card) 90+8' | Stadium: Abbey Stadium; Attendance: 3,411; Referee: Richie Watkins |

| 2 December 2023 Second Round | Cambridge United | 4–0 | Fleetwood Town | Cambridge |
| 15:00 GMT | Andrew 7'; Kachunga 11'; Okenabirhie 13'; Ahadme (penalty missed) 83'; Okedina (yellow card) 38' | | Stockley (yellow card) 65' | Stadium: Abbey Stadium; Attendance: 3,387; Referee: Seb Stockbridge |

| 6 January 2024 Third round | Blackburn Rovers | 5–2 | Cambridge United | Blackburn |
| 15:00 GMT | Szmodics 23', 37', 45+3'; Sigurðsson 66'; Leonard 81' | Report | Lankester 6'; Kaikai 26'; Bennett (yellow card) 53' | Stadium: Ewood Park; Attendance: 8,311; Referee: Geoff Eltringham |

=== EFL Cup ===
Cambridge were drawn away to Sutton United in the first round.

Win Draw Loss Fixtures

| 8 August 2023 First round | Sutton United | 2–2 (6–5 p) | Cambridge United | Sutton |
| 19:45 BST | Smith 38'; Beautyman 82' (pen.) | Report | Okenabirhie 18', 60' (pen.) | Stadium: Gander Green Lane; Attendance: 1,761; Referee: Daniel Middleton |
| | Penalties |
| | Eastmond (penalty scored); Angol (penalty scored); Milsom (penalty scored); Goodliffe (penalty missed); Kashket (penalty scored); Patrick (penalty scored); O'Brien (penalty scored) | | Ahadme (penalty scored); Lankester (penalty scored); Andrew (penalty scored); Thomas (penalty missed); Digby (penalty scored); Janneh (penalty scored); Dunk (penalty missed) |

=== EFL Trophy ===
In the group stage, Cambridge were drawn into Southern Group D alongside Peterborough United, Colchester United and Tottenham Hotspur U21.

| Pos | Div | Team | Pld | W | PW | PL | L | GF | GA | GD | Pts | Qualification |
|---|---|---|---|---|---|---|---|---|---|---|---|---|
| 1 | L1 | Peterborough United | 3 | 2 | 0 | 0 | 1 | 5 | 2 | +3 | 6 | Advance to Round 2 |
| 2 | L2 | Colchester United | 3 | 2 | 0 | 0 | 1 | 3 | 6 | −3 | 6 | Advance to Round 2 |
| 3 | ACA | Tottenham Hotspur U21 | 3 | 1 | 0 | 0 | 2 | 7 | 7 | 0 | 3 | |
| 4 | L1 | Cambridge United | 3 | 1 | 0 | 0 | 2 | 5 | 5 | 0 | 3 | |

Updated to match(es) played on 7 November 2023. Source: EFL.com

Win Draw Loss Fixtures

| 5 September 2023 Group stage | Peterborough United | 2–0 | Cambridge United | Peterborough |
| 19:00 BST | Katongo 19'; Burrows (yellow card) 51'; Mason-Clark 54' | Report | Kachunga (yellow card) 61'; McConnell (yellow card) 90' | Stadium: London Road Stadium; Attendance: 3,687; Referee: Kirsty Dowle |

| 17 October 2023 Group stage | Cambridge United | 1–2 | Colchester United | Cambridge |
| 19:00 BST | May (yellow card) 72'; Ahadme 90+5' (pen.) | | Tovide 17' (yellow card) 45+1'; Cooper 43'; Mingi (yellow card) 69' | Stadium: Abbey Stadium; Attendance: 991; Referee: Jamie O'Connor |

| 7 November 2023 Group stage | Cambridge United | 4–1 | Tottenham Hotspur U21 | Cambridge |
| 19:00 GMT | Yearn 41'; Janneh 53'; Lankester (yellow card) 78' (goal) 88'; McConnell (yellow card) 87'; Simper 90+3' | Report | Donley (yellow card) 70'; Lankshear 73' | Stadium: Abbey Stadium; Attendance: 1,311; Referee: Jacob Miles |
