= Saikou Janneh =

Gambian footballer

Personal information
- Date of birth: 11 January 2000 (age 26)
- Place of birth: Gunjur, The Gambia
- Height: 1.81 m (5 ft 11 in)
- Position: Winger

Team information
- Current team: Slough Town
- Number: 18

Youth career
- 2016: Bath City

Senior career*
Years	Team	Apps	(Gls)
2016–2017	Cadbury Heath	12	(0)
2018	Clevedon Town	12	(8)
2018–2022	Bristol City	7	(2)
2018–2019	→ Torquay United (loan)	28	(16)
2019–2020	→ Torquay United (loan)	8	(0)
2020–2021	→ Newport County (loan)	8	(1)
2022	→ Shrewsbury Town (loan)	12	(0)
2022–2024	Cambridge United	21	(1)
2023	→ AFC Wimbledon (loan)	17	(0)
2025	Al-Jazeera		
2025–2026	Truro City	11	(0)
2026–	Slough Town	3	(1)
- * Club domestic league appearances and goals as of 19:37, 12 October 2026 (UTC)

Saikou Janneh (born 11 January 2000) is a Gambian professional footballer who plays as a forward for National League South club Slough Town.

== Career ==
Born in Gunjur, The Gambia, Janneh first moved to England at the age of 14. In 2016, at the age of 16, Janneh joined the Bath City academy in conjunction with studying at Bath College. While studying at Bath College, Janneh played for Western League Premier Division sides Cadbury Heath and Clevedon Town. Janneh also made one appearance for Bath City in the Somerset Premier Cup scoring in a 7–0 win against Wellington.

Having previously had two trials, on 18 May 2018, Janneh joined Championship side Bristol City's academy.

On 28 August 2020, Janneh joined League Two side Newport County on loan until the end of the 2020–21 season. He made his debut for Newport on 8 September 2020, in the starting line up for the 1–0 EFL Trophy defeat to Cheltenham Town. He made his English Football League debut on 12 September 2020, as a second-half substitute for Ryan Taylor in the 1–1 draw for Newport County against Scunthorpe United on the first day of the 2020–21 League Two season. Janneh scored his first goal for Newport in the 1–0 League Two win against Tranmere Rovers on 17 October 2020. On 2 January 2021 his loan spell at Newport was ended.

On 1 January 2022 he joined Shrewsbury Town on loan for the remainder of the season.

On 30 June 2022, Janneh joined League One side Cambridge United on a two-year deal. On 24 January 2023, Janneh joined AFC Wimbledon on loan for the remainder of the season.

On 1 May 2024, Cambridge announced the player would be released at the end of his contract.

In October 2025, following a short spell with Kuwaiti Division One club Al-Jazeera, Janneh returned to England and subsequently joined National League club Truro City on a deal until the end of the season.

On 26 September 2026, Janneh joined National League South club Slough Town following his summer departure from Truro City.

== Personal life ==
Janneh is a Muslim and observes Ramadan.

== Career statistics ==
As of match played 6 January 2024

Appearances and goals by club, season and competition
Club	Season	League			FA Cup		EFL Cup		Other		Total	
Club	Season	Division	Apps	Goals	Apps	Goals	Apps	Goals	Apps	Goals	Apps	Goals
Cadbury Heath	2016–17	Western League; Premier Division	12	0	4	2	—		1 (Note: Appearance in Les Phillips Cup)	0	17	2
Bath City	2016–17	National League South	0	0	0	0	—		1 (Note: Appearance in Somerset Premier Cup)	1	1	1
Clevedon Town	2017–18	Western League; Premier Division	12	6	0	0	—		1	1	13	7
Bristol City	2018–19	Championship	0	0	0	0	0	0	—		0	0
Bristol City	2019–20	Championship	0	0	0	0	0	0	—		0	0
Bristol City	2020–21	Championship	4	0	0	0	0	0	—		4	0
Bristol City	2021–22	Championship	1	0	0	0	1	2	—		2	2
Bristol City	Total		5	0	0	0	1	2	—		6	2
Torquay United (loan)	2018–19	National League South	28	16	4	1	—		2 (Note: Appearance(s) in FA Trophy)	1	34	18
Torquay United (loan)	2019–20	National League	8	0	1	0	—		1	2	10	2
Newport County (loan)	2020–21	League Two	8	1	1	1	1	0	2 (Note: Appearances in EFL Trophy)	0	12	2
Shrewsbury Town (loan)	2021–22	League One	12	0	1	0	—		—		13	0
Cambridge United	2022–23	League One	10	1	2	0	2	0	3	0	17	1
Cambridge United	2023–24	League One	11	0	3	0	1	0	2	1	17	1
Cambridge United	Total		21	1	5	0	3	0	5	1	34	2
AFC Wimbledon (loan)	2022–23	League Two	17	0	—		—		—		17	0
Career total			123	24	15	4	5	2	13	6	157	36
