= Jack Stevens (footballer, born 1997) =

English footballer

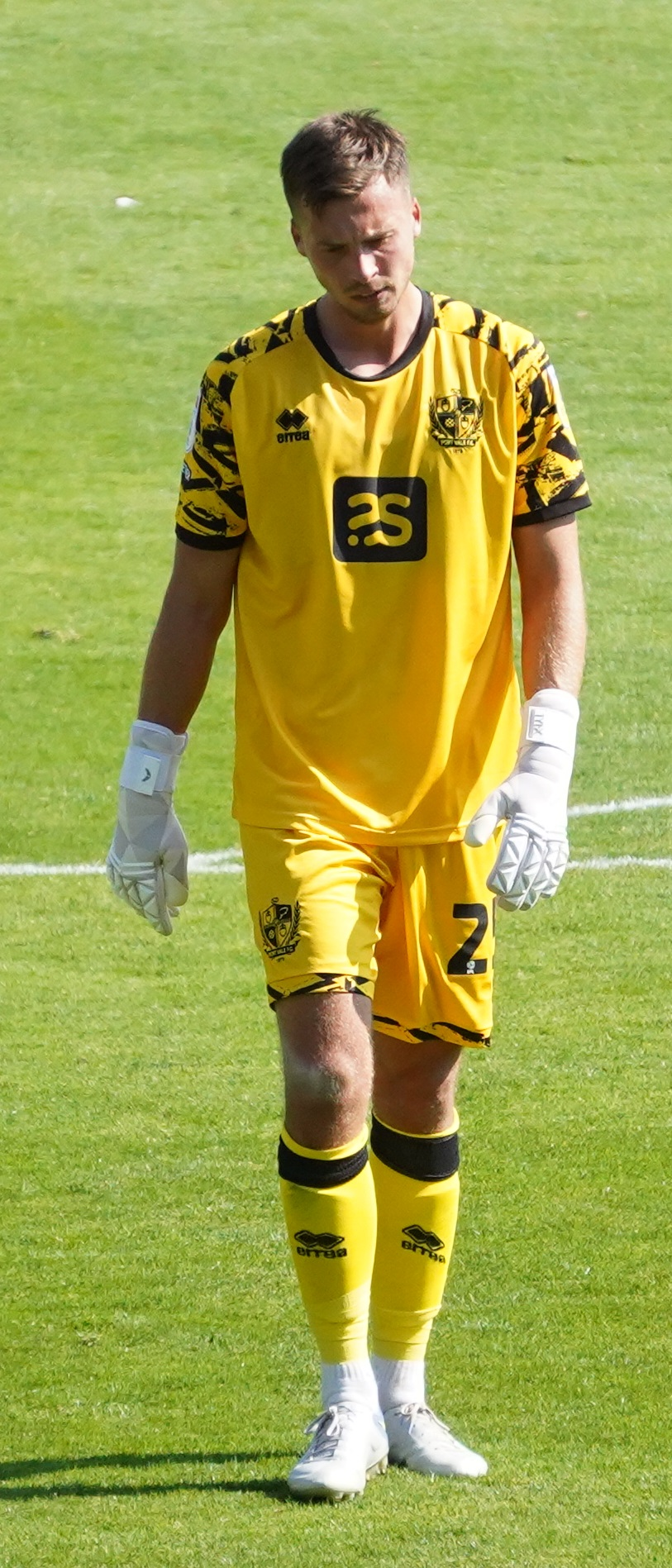
- Stevens playing for Port Vale (August 2022)

Personal information
- Full name: Jack Alexander Stevens
- Date of birth: 2 August 1997 (age 29)
- Place of birth: Ealing, England
- Height: 1.88 m (6 ft 2 in)
- Position: Goalkeeper

Team information
- Current team: Reading
- Number: 25

Youth career
- Chelsea
- Barnet
- 2013–2014: Reading
- 2014–2016: Oxford United

Senior career*
Years	Team	Apps	(Gls)
2016–2023	Oxford United	65	(0)
2016	→ Cirencester Town (loan)	2	(0)
2016	→ Oxford City (loan)	17	(0)
2017–2018	→ Oxford City (loan)	19	(0)
2018	→ Tamworth (loan)	15	(0)
2022–2023	→ Port Vale (loan)	27	(0)
2023–2025	Cambridge United	45	(0)
2025–	Reading	3	(0)
- * Club domestic league appearances and goals as of 5 November 2025 (UTC)

Jack Alexander Stevens (born 2 August 1997) is an English professional footballer who plays as a goalkeeper for EFL League One club Reading.

Stevens spent time in the youth teams at Chelsea, Barnet, and Reading before turning professional at Oxford United in April 2016. He was loaned out to Cirencester Town, Tamworth, and Port Vale. He left Oxford and joined Cambridge United in June 2023, where he remained for two seasons. He signed with Reading in June 2025.

== Career ==
=== Early career ===
Stevens spent time in the youth teams at Chelsea and Barnet but was rejected by both clubs due to his small stature. He attended the John Madejski Academy, a school associated with Reading.

=== Oxford United ===
Stevens underwent a growth spurt and joined the youth team at Oxford United in 2014 before being given a 12-month professional contract in April 2016. Manager Michael Appleton said that he had "worked very hard". This followed from a brief youth loan spell at Southern League Premier Division club Cirencester Town, where he made his senior debut in a 2–0 defeat at King's Lynn Town on 23 January 2016, and also played in a 5–2 home defeat to St. Neots Town seven days later.

On 5 August 2016, Stevens joined Oxford City of the National League South on a youth loan deal. He played 17 games before being recalled on 11 November to provide cover at United whilst Benjamin Büchel was on international duty. On 24 August 2017, Stevens returned to Oxford City on loan after manager Pep Clotet brought in Scott Shearer to act as backup to Simon Eastwood. He played 19 league and three FA Cup games, before being recalled from his loan on 9 January due after Eastwood picked up an injury. He was an unused substitute in the 2017 final of the EFL Trophy at Wembley Stadium, where Oxford were beaten 2–1 by Coventry City.

On 19 January 2018, Stevens joined Tamworth on a one-month loan deal. In March 2018, Stevens signed a new contract with Oxford United to keep him at the club until the summer of 2019; caretaker manager Derek Fazackerley described him as "very much as one for the future". He played 15 National League North matches as Tamworth were relegated in 21st-place.

He made his debut for Oxford United in a 2–1 win over Charlton Athletic on 19 April 2019, coming on as a substitute in the 54th minute after Eastwood had been sent off; the Oxford United website described how he made a "miracle save" as the game drew to a close. He started the 3–2 win at Shrewsbury Town three days later, before dropping to the bench as Eastwood was restored to the starting eleven. He signed a one-year contract extension in March 2020 after impressing towards the end of the 2019–20 season.

Stevens earned a start against Ipswich Town at the Kassam Stadium on 1 December 2020 and kept a clean sheet in a 0–0 draw. On 2 April 2021, police were called to the Stadium of Light after Stevens was allegedly headbutted at half-time during Oxford United's 3–1 defeat to Sunderland. The club later confirmed that they would not be pursuing further police action. He ended the 2020–21 season with 40 appearances to his name, helping Oxford to a sixth-place finish and a play-off semi-final defeat to Blackpool. He was named as the club's Young Player of the Year. He featured 30 times in the 2021–22 campaign as Oxford posted an eighth-place finish. He missed three months of the season after suffering a severe bout of glandular fever.

On 11 August 2022, Stevens signed a contract extension with Oxford United until the summer of 2025. The same day, he was loaned to League One rivals Port Vale until the end of the 2022–23 season, as United manager Karl Robinson looked to play new signing Edward McGinty. Vale manager Darrell Clarke started Stevens ahead of the club's number one Aidan Stone in the goalless draw with Bolton Wanderers at Vale Park just two days later. Stevens remained the preferred choice in goal until he was dropped in February, and then in a surprise appearance on Good Friday he dropped the ball into his own net in a 3–0 defeat at Accrington Stanley.

=== Cambridge United ===
On 21 June 2023, Stevens signed a two-year deal with League One side Cambridge United after being transferred from Oxford on a free transfer plus sell-on clause; he was manager Mark Bonner's first signing of the summer. Speaking in November, he said he was "loving life" at the Abbey Stadium after keeping six clean sheets in eight games. He played 36 games before he ended the 2023–24 season at the end of March having been sidelined with a hamstring injury.

Stevens lost his place in the starting eleven to loan-signing Vicente Reyes at the start of the 2024–25 season. He made his first league start of the campaign in mid-November under Garry Monk when Reyes was absent on international duty. Stevens was sidelined further under new manager Neil Harris, with Marko Maroši and Nathan Bishop getting gametime ahead of him after Reyes was sidelined through injury, leaving Harris to praise Stevens for his patience. He played 16 games in the 2024–25 campaign and was released upon the expiry of his contract.

=== Reading ===
On 25 June 2025, Stevens agreed to join League One side Reading on a two-year deal. Manager Noel Hunt remarked that goalkeeping coach Rob Shay had known him for many years. He kept his first league clean sheet for the club in a 1–0 win over Northampton Town on 21 October and said he was proud to have done so representing his local club. He remained an understudy to Joel Castro Pereira throughout the 2025–26 season.

== Career statistics ==
As of match played 1 November 2025

Appearances and goals by club, season and competition
Club	Season	League			FA Cup		League Cup		Other		Total	
Club	Season	Division	Apps	Goals	Apps	Goals	Apps	Goals	Apps	Goals	Apps	Goals
Oxford United	2015–16	League Two	0	0	0	0	0	0	0	0	0	0
Oxford United	2016–17	League One	0	0	0	0	0	0	0	0	0	0
Oxford United	2017–18	League One	0	0	0	0	0	0	0	0	0	0
Oxford United	2018–19	League One	2	0	0	0	0	0	0	0	2	0
Oxford United	2019–20	League One	0	0	0	0	0	0	3 (Note: Appearance(s) in the EFL Trophy)	0	3	0
Oxford United	2020–21	League One	33	0	1	0	1	0	5 (Note: Two appearances in League One play-offs, three appearances in EFL Trophy)	0	40	0
Oxford United	2021–22	League One	30	0	0	0	0	0	0	0	30	0
Oxford United	2022–23	League One	0	0	0	0	0	0	0	0	0	0
Oxford United	Total		65	0	1	0	1	0	8	0	75	0
Cirencester Town (loan)	2015–16	Southern League; Premier Division	2	0	0	0	–		0	0	2	0
Oxford City (loan)	2016–17	National League South	17	0	0	0	–		0	0	17	0
Oxford City (loan)	2017–18	National League South	19	0	3	0	–		0	0	22	0
Oxford City (loan)	Total		36	0	3	0	0	0	0	0	39	0
Tamworth (loan)	2017–18	National League North	15	0	0	0	–		0	0	15	0
Port Vale (loan)	2022–23	League One	27	0	0	0	0	0	1	0	28	0
Cambridge United	2023–24	League One	33	0	3	0	0	0	0	0	36	0
Cambridge United	2024–25	League One	12	0	0	0	1	0	3	0	16	0
Cambridge United	Total		45	0	3	0	1	0	3	0	52	0
Reading	2025–26	League One	3	0	1	0	3	0	3	0	10	0
Reading	2026–27	League One	0	0	0	0	0	0	0	0	0	0
Reading	Total		3	0	1	0	3	0	3	0	10	0
Career total			193	0	8	0	5	0	15	0	221	0

== Honours ==
Oxford United

- EFL Trophy runner-up: 2017
