= Liam Bennett (footballer) =

English footballer

- Bennett with Cambridge United in 2026

Personal information
- Full name: Liam Dennis Bennett
- Date of birth: 30 November 2001 (age 24)
- Height: 1.71 m (5 ft 7 in)
- Position: Right-back

Team information
- Current team: Cambridge United
- Number: 2

Youth career
- –2020: Sudbury

Senior career*
Years	Team	Apps	(Gls)
2020–2021	St Neots Town	8	(1)
2021–	Cambridge United	167	(4)
2021	→ Hemel Hempstead Town (loan)	4	(0)
2022	→ Walsall (loan)	20	(1)
- * Club domestic league appearances and goals as of 08:24, 7 November 2026 (UTC)

Liam Dennis Bennett (born 30 November 2001) is an English professional footballer who plays as a right-back for EFL League One club Cambridge United.

He spent the start of the 2022/23 season out on loan at League Two side Walsall, where they found themselves in play off places contention after a run of unbeaten games. Unfortunately for the Saddler's, Cambridge recalled their man in form at the end of December 2022.

In February 2023, Cambridge held out a 1-1 draw against promotion favourites Ipswich Town. Cambridge's number 28 then won January's player of the month award poll on Cambridge United's twitter page.

== Club career ==
Bennett initially trialled at Cambridge United while playing for Sudbury. He signed for Cambridge United partner club, St Neots Town in 2020, before eventually joining Cambridge United themselves ahead of the 2021–22 season. Having made ten appearances across his first season, Bennett signed a new two-year contract, with the option for a further year, in May 2022.

On 15 June 2022, Bennett joined League Two club Walsall on a season-long loan deal. On 31 December, Cambridge United manager Mark Bonner chose to recall Bennett from his loan deal following a number of defensive injuries picked up by the club.

On 10 June 2025, the club announced he had signed a new two-year contract.

== Career statistics ==
As of match played 6 November 2026.

Appearances and goals by club, season and competition
Club	Season	League			FA Cup		EFL Cup		Other		Total	
Club	Season	Division	Apps	Goals	Apps	Goals	Apps	Goals	Apps	Goals	Apps	Goals
St Neots Town	2020–21	Southern League	8	1	2	0	–		4 (Note: Appearances in the FA Trophy)	1	14	2
Cambridge United	2021–22	League One	5	0	0	0	0	0	5 (Note: Appearances in EFL Trophy)	0	10	0
Cambridge United	2022–23	League One	23	0	0	0	0	0	0	0	23	0
Cambridge United	2023–24	League One	46	0	3	0	1	0	2	0	52	0
Cambridge United	2024–25	League One	41	1	2	0	1	0	4	1	48	2
Cambridge United	2025–26	League Two	40	2	3	0	3	0	3	0	49	2
Cambridge United	2026–27	League One	12	1	1	0	2	0	0	0	15	1
Cambridge United	Total		167	4	9	0	7	0	14	1	197	5
Hemel Hempstead Town (loan)	2021–22	National League South	4	0	0	0	–		0	0	4	0
Walsall (loan)	2022–23	League Two	20	1	0	0	2	0	3	0	25	1
Career total			199	6	11	0	9	0	20	1	239	7

== Honours ==
Individual

- Cambridge United Player of the Year: 2023–24
