= Jack Lankester =

English footballer

Personal information
- Full name: Jack Richard Lankester
- Date of birth: 19 January 2000 (age 26)
- Place of birth: Bury St Edmunds, England
- Height: 5 ft 10 in (1.77 m)
- Position: Winger

Team information
- Current team: Crewe Alexandra
- Number: 7

Youth career
- 2006–2018: Ipswich Town

Senior career*
Years	Team	Apps	(Gls)
2018–2021	Ipswich Town	28	(3)
2018	→ Bury Town (loan)	6	(3)
2021–2024	Cambridge United	100	(6)
2024–	Crewe Alexandra	34	(7)
- * Club domestic league appearances and goals as of 21:44, 21 March 2026 (UTC)

Jack Richard Lankester (born 19 January 2000) is an English professional footballer who plays as a winger for EFL League Two club Crewe Alexandra, having previously played for Ipswich Town and Cambridge United.

== Club career ==
=== Ipswich Town ===
Born in Bury St Edmunds, Lankester attended King Edward VI School, Bury St Edmunds and grew up supporting Ipswich Town. He joined the Ipswich youth system aged six, progressing through the club's academy before earning a scholarship aged 14. In March 2018 he joined hometown team Bury Town on a work experience loan. He progressed from the under-18 team through to the under-23s during 2018, enjoying impressive scoring form, including a brace in a 2–1 win over Dagenham & Redbridge in the FA Youth Cup on 16 January 2018.

After being involved in the first team squad during the 2018–19 pre-season, he signed his first professional contract with the club on 17 August 2018, signing a two-year deal with the option of a further year's extension. He made his professional debut for the club on 21 October 2018, coming on as a substitute in a 2–0 home defeat to Queens Park Rangers. After making his second first-team appearance, Lankester was placed on standby for the England U19 national team in November 2018. He scored his first goal for the club in a 3–2 home defeat to Millwall on 1 January 2019. On 7 January 2019, he signed a new three-year contract at the club. He made 11 appearances in his debut senior season at Portman Road, with it being cut short in February 2019 due to suffering a back injury which put him out for the rest of the season. His impressive progress and lone goal earned him the club's Young Player of the Year award for the 2018–19 season.

He recovered and returned to the first team for pre-season, but suffered another stress fracture injury to his back in a friendly against Fortuna Düsseldorf in July. Lankaster subsequently underwent surgery which ruled him out until April 2020. Due to this injury and the season being suspended and later ended by the COVID-19 pandemic, Lankester made no appearances during the 2019–20 season.

Lankester returned to first-team action during the 2020–21 pre-season. He made his first appearance in almost 20 months as a substitute in a 2–0 away win over Bristol Rovers on 19 September 2020, crossing the ball into the box to force an own goal from Max Ehmer to open the scoring, before providing an assist for the second goal from Jon Nolan. He scored his first goal following his comeback from injury against Sunderland at the Stadium of Light on 3 November 2020. In the following league game, Lankester scored a 97th-minute winner in a 2–1 home win over Shrewsbury Town.

=== Cambridge United ===
On 25 June 2021, Lankester joined fellow East Anglia club Cambridge United for an undisclosed fee, ending his 15-year association with Ipswich Town. On 1 May 2024, the club put the player on the transfer list.

=== Crewe Alexandra ===
On 27 June 2024, Lankester joined League Two side Crewe Alexandra on a three-year deal. He made his debut in the side's League Two opener away at Barrow, and scored his first Crewe goal in the side's 3–0 win over Harrogate Town at Gresty Road on 21 September 2024.

== Career statistics ==
As of match played 21 March 2026

Appearances and goals by club, season and competition
Club	Season	League			FA Cup		EFL Cup		Other		Total	
Club	Season	Division	Apps	Goals	Apps	Goals	Apps	Goals	Apps	Goals	Apps	Goals
Ipswich Town	2018–19	Championship	11	1	0	0	0	0	—		11	1
Ipswich Town	2019–20	League One	0	0	0	0	0	0	0	0	0	0
Ipswich Town	2020–21	League One	17	2	1	0	0	0	1 (Note: Appearance in EFL Trophy)	0	19	2
Ipswich Town	Total		28	3	1	0	0	0	1	0	30	3
Bury Town (loan)	2017–18	IL North Division	6	3	0	0	—		0	0	6	3
Cambridge United	2021–22	League One	18	1	3	0	1	0	4	0	26	1
Cambridge United	2022–23	League One	42	4	3	0	2	0	3	0	50	4
Cambridge United	2023–24	League One	40	1	3	1	1	0	3	1	47	3
Cambridge United	Total		100	6	9	1	4	0	10	1	123	8
Crewe Alexandra	2024–25	League Two	23	7	0	0	1	0	2	0	26	7
Crewe Alexandra	2025–26	League Two	11	0	0	0	0	0	0	0	11	0
Crewe Alexandra	Total		34	7	0	0	1	0	2	0	37	7
Career total			168	19	10	1	5	0	13	1	196	21

== Honours ==
Individual

- Ipswich Town Young Player of the Year: 2018–19
