= James Holden (footballer) =

English footballer (born 2001)

Personal information
- Full name: James William Holden
- Date of birth: 4 September 2001 (age 25)
- Place of birth: Milton Keynes, England
- Position: Goalkeeper

Team information
- Current team: Wealdstone
- Number: 31

Youth career
- 2019: Bury

Senior career*
Years	Team	Apps	(Gls)
2019–2022	Reading	0	(0)
2019	→ Bognor Regis Town (loan)	2	(0)
2019	→ Bracknell Town (loan)	1	(0)
2021	→ Maidenhead United (loan)	5	(0)
2021–2022	→ Maidenhead United (loan)	8	(0)
2022–2024	Cambridge United	0	(0)
2023	→ Dulwich Hamlet (loan)	3	(0)
2023	→ Welling United (loan)	1	(0)
2024	Hemel Hempstead Town	2	(0)
2024–2025	Aveley	25	(0)
2025	Hampton & Richmond Borough	14	(0)
2025–2026	Hemel Hempstead Town	2	(0)
2026	→ Billericay Town (loan)	1	(0)
2026	Wealdstone	0	(0)
2026–	Gosport Borough	1	(0)
- * Club domestic league appearances and goals as of 22:59, 13 September 2026 (UTC)

James William Holden (born 4 September 2001) is an English professional footballer who plays as a goalkeeper for Southern League Premier Division South club Gosport Borough.

== Club career ==
=== Bury ===
Holden joined Bury in February 2019 going straight into the side for their FA Youth Cup quarter final defeat to Liverpool. Holden became a free agent following the club's expulsion from the EFL in September in 2019.

=== Reading ===
Following a short trial, Holden joined Reading in September 2019. At the end of the same month, Holden joined Bognor Regis Town on loan. On 4 October, after two clean sheets in two games for Bognor Regis Town, Holden joined Bracknell Town on a short-term loan deal.

On 2 July 2020, Reading announced that Holden had signed professional terms with the club.

On 11 May 2021, Holden was offered a new contract by Reading, the day before joining Maidenhead United on loan for the remainder of the season.

On 2 July 2021, Reading announced that Holden had signed new one-year contract. Later that month, Holden joined Maidenhead United on a season-long loan deal. He was recalled from his loan deal on 10 January 2022.

On 20 May 2022, Reading confirmed Holden would be released by the club when his contract ended on 30 June 2022.

=== Cambridge United ===
On 18 May 2022, Cambridge United announced that Holden would join the club on a two-year contract.

In February 2023, Holden joined National League South club Dulwich Hamlet on a one-month loan deal.

On 21 October 2023, Holden joined National League South club Welling United on a one-month loan deal.

=== Non-League ===
In December 2024, following a spell with Hemel Hempstead Town, he joined Aveley, for whom he made 25 appearances across all competitions.

On 25 June 2025, it was announced that Holden would join Hampton & Richmond Borough following the expiry of his contract at Aveley. On 11 November 2025, he left Hampton & Richmond and on 19 December 2025, Hemel Hempstead Town announced that he had resigned for them.

On 5 March 2026, Billericay Town announced that he had signed on a dual registration, with Holden keeping a clean sheet on his debut against Lewes. On 4 May 2026, he played in the Isthmian Premier League play-off final, where he helped Billericay beat Brentwood Town 2–1 to secure promotion back to the National League South

In August 2026, Holden joined National League side Wealdstone. The following month, he signed for Gosport Borough.

== Career statistics ==
As of match played 18 August 2026

Appearances and goals by club, season and competition
Club	Season	League			National Cup		League Cup		Other		Total	
Club	Season	Division	Apps	Goals	Apps	Goals	Apps	Goals	Apps	Goals	Apps	Goals
Reading	2019–20	Championship	0	0	0	0	0	0	—		0	0
Reading	2020–21	Championship	0	0	0	0	0	0	—		0	0
Reading	2021–22	Championship	0	0	0	0	0	0	—		0	0
Reading	Total		0	0	0	0	0	0	—		0	0
Bognor Regis Town (loan)	2019–20	Isthmian League Premier Division	2	0	0	0	—		—		2	0
Bracknell Town (loan)	2019–20	Isthmian League South Central Division	1	0	0	0	—		—		1	0
Maidenhead United (loan)	2020–21	National League	5	0	0	0	—		—		5	0
Maidenhead United (loan)	2021–22	National League	8	0	1	0	—		—		9	0
Cambridge United	2022–23	League One	0	0	0	0	0	0	0	0	0	0
Cambridge United	2023–24	League One	0	0	0	0	0	0	0	0	0	0
Cambridge United	Total		0	0	0	0	0	0	0	0	0	0
Dulwich Hamlet (loan)	2022–23	National League South	3	0	0	0	—		—		3	0
Welling United (loan)	2023–24	National League South	1	0	0	0	0	0	0	0	1	0
Hemel Hempstead Town	2024–25	National League South	2	0	0	0	−		1 (Note: Appearance(s) in FA Trophy)	0	3	0
Aveley	2024–25	National League South	25	0	0	0	−		0	0	25	0
Hampton & Richmond Borough	2025–26	National League South	14	0	3	0	−		0	0	17	0
Hemel Hempstead Town	2025–26	National League South	2	0	0	0	−		0	0	2	0
Billericay Town	2025–26	Isthmian League Premier Division	1	0	0	0	−		2 (Note: Appearance(s) in Isthmian League play-offs)	0	3	0
Wealdstone	2026–27	National League	0	0	0	0	−		1 (Note: Appearance(s) in National League Cup)	0	1	0
Career total			64	0	4	0	0	0	4	0	72	0
