= Adam May (footballer) =

English footballer (born 1997)

Personal information
- Full name: Adam John May
- Date of birth: 6 December 1997 (age 28)
- Place of birth: Southampton, England
- Height: 1.82 m (5 ft 11 1/2 in)
- Position: Midfielder

Team information
- Current team: Bath City

Youth career
- 2005–2015: Portsmouth

Senior career*
Years	Team	Apps	(Gls)
2015–2020	Portsmouth	15	(0)
2015	→ Gosport Borough (loan)	4	(0)
2016–2017	→ Sutton United (loan)	20	(1)
2018	→ Aldershot Town (loan)	12	(3)
2019–2020	→ Swindon Town (loan)	9	(1)
2020	→ Boreham Wood (loan)	2	(1)
2020–2024	Cambridge United	115	(9)
2024–2025	Forest Green Rovers	47	(2)
2025–2026	Weston-super-Mare	4	(0)
2026	Eastbourne Borough	18	(5)
2026	Chelmsford City	13	(2)
2026–	Bath City	0	(0)
- * Club domestic league appearances and goals as of 23:03, 6 November 2026 (UTC)

Adam John May (born 6 December 1997) is an English professional footballer who plays as a central midfielder for Southern League Premier Division South club Bath City.

== Club career ==
=== Portsmouth ===
Born in Southampton, May progressed through Portsmouth's youth categories. He signed a two-year scholarship contract on 4 July 2014.

May made his League Two debut on 18 April 2015, coming on as a late substitute for fellow youth graduate Ben Close in a 0–1 home defeat against Bury. On 1 August he signed a one-year professional deal with Pompey, being promoted to the main squad.

==== Gosport Borough (loan) ====
On 30 October 2015, May was loaned to Gosport Borough for a month, making four appearances and scoring no goals.

==== Sutton United (loan) ====
In October 2016, May joined National League side Sutton United on loan, initially for one month and later extended to the end of the season. He made his debut for Sutton on 25 October in a 2–2 draw at home against Maidstone United.

On 14 January 2017, May scored his first senior goal in an FA Trophy second round away tie against Worthing, a game which ended 2–2; he also scored in the replay on 25 January, netting a vital extra time winner for Sutton, capping a man of the match performance. He was part of the team which knocked out Championship side Leeds United 1–0 in the fourth round of the FA Cup, putting Sutton into the fifth round of the competition for the first time in the club's 118-year history, and appeared in the fifth round tie, a 0–2 defeat to Arsenal on 20 February.

On 22 April, May scored his first league goal with a 20-yard strike in a 5–2 victory over Chester. At the end of the season May won the Young Player of the Year award.

==== 2017–18 season ====
Following his successful loan spell at Sutton United, May played a prominent part in Portsmouth's 2017–18 pre-season, with new manager Kenny Jackett keen to integrate young players into the first-team squad. Due to the departure of club captain Michael Doyle, May began the new season as first-choice midfield partner to Danny Rose in Jackett's preferred 4–2–3–1 formation.

==== 2018–19 season ====
At the start of the 2018–19 season, May signed for Aldershot Town on a loan deal until the 5 December 2018. He made 12 league appearances for the club before being recalled slightly prematurely by Jackett for Pompey's EFL Trophy round 2 match against Arsenal U21s on 4 December, in which he hit the upright and the crossbar across both halves. May was awarded man of the match and Portsmouth went on to win the game 2–1.

Portsmouth won the EFL Trophy that season, beating Sunderland in the final. May played 4 out of the 8 total games in their successful campaign.

==== Swindon Town (loan) ====
In June 2019 he joined Swindon Town on loan. He scored his first Swindon goal on his debut in an EFL Trophy tie against Chelsea U21s on 6 August 2019. May was recalled in January 2020.

==== Cambridge United ====
In September 2020, May joined Cambridge United on a free transfer. He scored his first goal for Cambridge, away to Morecambe in a 5-0 win in League Two. May was also a huge part of Cambridge success in getting promotion. on 13 May 2022, May signed a new contract. During Cambridge's 2-1 defeat to Bristol Rovers in October 2022 May picked up a knee injury which required reconstruction which would keep him out for the remainder of the 2022–23 season.

On 1 May 2024 he was transfer listed.

=== Forest Green Rovers ===
On 3 July 2024, May joined National League side Forest Green Rovers on a free transfer. He departed the club by mutual consent in December 2025.

=== Weston-super-Mare ===
On 6 December 2025, May joined National League South club Weston-super-Mare on a short-term contract, playing five times during his one month at the club.

=== Eastbourne Borough ===
On 22 January 2026, May was announced to have signed for National League South club Eastbourne Borough.

=== Chelmsford City ===
On 30 July 2026, May signed for Chelmsford City.

=== Bath City ===
On 6 November 2026, May joined Southern League side Bath City.

== Career statistics ==
As of match played 29 April 2026

Appearances and goals by club, season and competition
Club	Season	League			FA Cup		EFL Cup		Other		Total	
Club	Season	Division	Apps	Goals	Apps	Goals	Apps	Goals	Apps	Goals	Apps	Goals
Portsmouth	2014–15	League Two	1	0	0	0	0	0	0	0	1	0
Portsmouth	2015–16	League Two	1	0	1	0	0	0	1 (Note: Appearance(s) in Football League Trophy)	0	3	0
Portsmouth	2016–17	League Two	0	0	0	0	1	0	2 (Note: Appearance(s) in EFL Trophy)	0	3	0
Portsmouth	2017–18	League One	13	0	0	0	1	0	4	0	18	0
Portsmouth	2018–19	League One	0	0	1	0	0	0	4	0	5	0
Portsmouth	Total		15	0	2	0	2	0	11	0	30	0
Gosport Borough (loan)	2015–16	National League South	4	0	0	0	0	0	0	0	4	0
Sutton United (loan)	2016–17	National League	20	1	4	0	0	0	5	2	29	3
Aldershot Town (loan)	2018–19	National League	12	3	0	0	0	0	0	0	12	3
Swindon Town (loan)	2019–20	League Two	9	0	0	0	1	0	3	1	13	1
Boreham Wood (loan)	2019–20	National League	2	1	0	0	0	0	0	0	2	1
Cambridge United	2020–21	League Two	38	3	1	0	2	0	5	0	46	3
Cambridge United	2021–22	League One	38	5	5	1	2	0	5	0	50	6
Cambridge United	2022–23	League One	13	1	0	0	1	0	2	0	16	1
Cambridge United	2023–24	League One	26	0	2	0	0	0	2	0	30	0
Cambridge United	Total		115	9	8	1	5	0	14	0	142	10
Forest Green Rovers	2024–25	National League	46	2	1	0	0	0	2 (Note: One appearance in National League play-offs, one appearance in FA Trophy)	0	49	2
Forest Green Rovers	2025–26	National League	1	0	0	0	0	0	0	0	1	0
Forest Green Rovers	Total		47	2	1	0	0	0	2	0	50	2
Weston-super-Mare	2025–26	National League South	4	0	0	0	0	0	0	0	4	0
Eastbourne Borough	2025–26	National League South	18	5	0	0	0	0	1 (Note: Appearance(s) in Sussex Senior Cup)	0	19	5
Career total			246	21	15	1	8	0	36	3	305	25

== Honours ==
Portsmouth

- EFL Trophy: 2018–19

Cambridge United

- EFL League Two second-place promotion: 2020–21
