= Jubril Okedina =

Malawian footballer (born 2000)

Personal information
- Full name: Jubril Adesope Okedina
- Date of birth: 26 October 2000 (age 26)
- Place of birth: Woolwich, England
- Height: 1.83 m (6 ft 0 in)
- Position: Defender

Team information
- Current team: Barnsley
- Number: 12

Youth career
- –2021: Tottenham Hotspur

Senior career*
Years	Team	Apps	(Gls)
2020–2021	Tottenham Hotspur	0	(0)
2021	→ Cambridge United (loan)	14	(0)
2021–2025	Cambridge United	94	(0)
2025–2026	Bohemians	3	(0)
2026–	Barnsley	5	(0)

International career^{‡}
2024–	Malawi	2	(0)
- * Club domestic league appearances and goals as of 07:27, 21 November 2026 (UTC) ‡ National team caps and goals as of 22:30, 22 September 2025 (UTC)

Jubril Adesope Okedina (born 26 October 2000) is a professional footballer who plays as a defender for Barnsley. Born in England, he plays for the Malawi national team.

== Early and personal life ==
Born and raised in Woolwich, Okedina attended Beths Grammar School in Bexley.

== Club career ==
After beginning his career at Tottenham Hotspur, Okedina signed on loan for Cambridge United in January 2021. He made his senior debut on 12 January 2021, playing in the EFL Trophy against Oxford United. Okedina signed permanently to Cambridge in August 2021. Okedina signed a new three-year contract in July 2022. On 1 May 2024, he was transfer listed by the club.

On 8 May 2025, the club announced he would be leaving in June when his contract expired.

On 31 August 2025, Okedina signed an 18-month contract with League of Ireland Premier Division club Bohemians. He made just 3 appearances before the club confirmed in June 2026 that he had left the club by mutual consent to return to England.

On 15 September 2026, Okedina signed for EFL League One club Barnsley.

== International career ==
In March 2024, Okedina was called up to play for Malawi for the first time. He made his debut on 23 March 2024, starting in a 4–0 defeat to Kenya.

== Personal life ==
Born in England, Okedina is of Nigerian and Malawian descent.

== Career statistics ==
=== Club ===
As of match played 20 November 2026

Appearances and goals by club, season and competition
Club	Season	League			National Cup (Note: Includes FA Cup & FAI Cup)		League Cup (Note: Includes EFL Cup)		Other		Total	
Club	Season	Division	Apps	Goals	Apps	Goals	Apps	Goals	Apps	Goals	Apps	Goals
Tottenham Hotspur	2020–21	Premier League	0	0	0	0	0	0	0	0	0	0
Cambridge United (loan)	2020–21	League Two	14	0	0	0	0	0	1 (Note: Appearance(s) in EFL Trophy)	0	15	0
Cambridge United	2021–22	League One	30	0	5	0	1	0	5	0	41	0
Cambridge United	2022–23	League One	25	0	3	0	1	0	3	0	32	0
Cambridge United	2023–24	League One	12	0	2	0	1	0	3	0	18	0
Cambridge United	2024–25	League One	27	0	1	0	1	0	3	0	32	0
Cambridge United	Total		94	0	11	0	4	0	14	0	123	0
Bohemians	2025	LOI Premier Division	3	0	–		–		–		3	0
Bohemians	2026	LOI Premier Division	0	0	0	0	–		0	0	0	0
Bohemians	Total		3	0	0	0	0	0	0	0	3	0
Barnsley	2026–27	League One	5	0	1	0	0	0	2	0	8	0
Career total			116	0	12	0	4	0	17	0	149	0

=== International ===
As of match played 26 March 2024

Appearances and goals by national team and year
National team	Year	Apps	Goals
Malawi	2024	2	0
Total		2	0
