= George Thomas (footballer, born 1997) =

Wales international footballer

Personal information
- Full name: George Stanley Thomas
- Date of birth: 24 March 1997 (age 29)
- Place of birth: Leicester, England
- Height: 5 ft 8 in (1.73 m)
- Position: Midfielder

Team information
- Current team: Morecambe
- Number: 32

Youth career
- –2014: Coventry City

Senior career*
Years	Team	Apps	(Gls)
2014–2017	Coventry City	42	(5)
2015	→ Yeovil Town (loan)	5	(0)
2017–2020	Leicester City	0	(0)
2018–2019	→ Scunthorpe United (loan)	37	(3)
2020	→ ADO Den Haag (loan)	3	(0)
2020–2023	Queens Park Rangers	40	(0)
2023–2025	Cambridge United	37	(2)
2025–	Morecambe	26	(3)

International career^{‡}
2012–2014	Wales U17	13	(5)
2014–2016	Wales U19	8	(3)
2017	Wales U20	3	(2)
2017–2018	Wales U21	8	(5)
2018–2019	Wales	3	(0)
- * Club domestic league appearances and goals as of 18:40, 8 May 2025 (UTC) ‡ National team caps and goals as of 21:43, 20 March 2019 (UTC)

George Stanley Thomas (born 24 March 1997) is a professional footballer who plays as a midfielder for Morecambe. Born in England, he has represented Wales at senior international level.

== Club career ==
=== Coventry City ===
Thomas made his professional debut starting on 28 January 2014 in a 2–0 League One loss to Leyton Orient, with City short on options up front manager Steven Pressley said he had no problems with throwing Thomas into the starting lineup.

On 24 October 2015, Thomas joined Yeovil Town on a one-month loan and made his debut in a 3–2 defeat to Cambridge United.

He scored his first goal for Coventry in an EFL Trophy tie against Wycombe Wanderers on 9 November 2016. Later that season he then scored in a 2–1 win, also against Wycombe, in the EFL Trophy Semi-Finals which sent Coventry to their first Wembley final since 1987. In the final Thomas scored the second goal in a 2–1 win against Oxford United.

=== Leicester City ===
On 8 August 2017, he signed for Premier League side Leicester City on a three-year contract for an undisclosed fee. In June 2020, it was announced that Thomas would be released from the club upon the expiry of his contract at the end of the month.

==== Loan to Scunthorpe ====
On 3 August 2018, Thomas joined EFL League One club Scunthorpe United on loan until the end of the 2018–19 season.

==== Loan to ADO Den Haag ====
On 13 January 2020, Thomas joined Eredivisie side ADO Den Haag on loan until the end of the 2019–20 season.

=== Queens Park Rangers ===
On 27 July 2020 Thomas joined west London club Queens Park Rangers on a free transfer, signing a three-year deal with the option to extend it by another 12 months. He made his debut for the club on 12 September in an opening day victory over Nottingham Forest, coming on as a 75th minute substitute for Tom Carroll.

=== Cambridge United ===
On 31 January 2023, following the termination of his QPR contract, Thomas joined EFL League One club Cambridge United on an initial six-month contract. On 8 June 2023, it was announced that Thomas had signed a two-year contract extension.

On 8 May 2025, Cambridge announced he would be leaving in June when his contract expired.

On 12 September 2025, Thomas joined National League side Morecambe on a free transfer. On 16 May 2026, Morecambe announced he was being released.

== International career ==
In April 2013 he was called up to the Wales U17 team. He made his debut on 11 April 2013 coming off the bench in the 1–0 win against Northern Ireland U17. He made his first start and scored his first international goal, on 12 April 2013, in the 1–1 draw against Faroe Islands U17. He scored his second goal in his third appearance against Malta U17 on 22 August 2013. On his sixth appearance, Thomas got his third international goal scoring against Slovenia U17 on 28 September 2013. His fourth goal came on his seventh appearance against Czech Republic U17 on 18 February 2014. Thomas made his Wales U19 debut against Montenegro in September 2014. Thomas scored his first goal for Wales U19 in a 2–1 win against Albania U19 in November 2014.

In May 2017, Thomas was named in the Wales under-20 squad for the 2017 Toulon Tournament. He made his debut for the side in the tournament opener against Ivory Coast, scoring both of his sides' goals during a 2–2 draw. He was named in the starting line-up in Wales' remaining two group matches against France and Bahrain as Wales were eliminated in the group stage.

Thomas made his debut for the under-21 side on 1 September 2017 in a 3–0 victory over Switzerland, scoring the final goal of the game in injury time.

He received his first call up to the senior Wales squad in May 2018 for a friendly against Mexico. Thomas went on to win his first senior Wales cap in the Mexico match, replacing Harry Wilson as a 64th minute substitute.

== Career statistics ==
=== Club ===
As of match played 2 March 2024

Appearances and goals by club, season and competition
Club	Season	League			National Cup		League Cup		Other		Total	
Club	Season	Division	Apps	Goals	Apps	Goals	Apps	Goals	Apps	Goals	Apps	Goals
Coventry City	2013–14	League One	1	0	0	0	0	0	0	0	1	0
Coventry City	2014–15	League One	6	0	0	0	0	0	1 (Note: Appearances in Football League Trophy)	0	7	0
Coventry City	2015–16	League One	7	0	0	0	1	0	1	0	9	0
Coventry City	2016–17	League One	28	5	1	0	1	0	6	4	36	9
Coventry City	Total		42	5	1	0	2	0	8	4	53	9
Yeovil Town (loan)	2015–16	League Two	5	0	0	0	0	0	0	0	5	0
Leicester City	2017–18	Premier League	0	0	0	0	0	0	0	0	0	0
Leicester City	2018–19	Premier League	0	0	0	0	0	0	0	0	0	0
Leicester City	2019–20	Premier League	0	0	0	0	0	0	0	0	0	0
Leicester City	Total		0	0	0	0	0	0	0	0	0	0
Leicester City U23	2017–18	—			—		—		2 (Note: Appearances in EFL Trophy)	1	2	1
Leicester City U23	2019–20	—			—		—		4	0	4	0
Leicester City U23	Total		0	0	0	0	0	0	6	1	6	1
Scunthorpe United (loan)	2018–19	League One	37	3	2	0	1	0	0	0	40	3
ADO Den Haag (loan)	2019–20	Eredivisie	3	0	0	0	0	0	0	0	3	0
Queens Park Rangers	2020–21	Championship	17	0	1	0	0	0	0	0	18	0
Queens Park Rangers	2021–22	Championship	20	0	2	0	2	0	0	0	24	0
Queens Park Rangers	2022–23	Championship	3	0	0	0	1	0	0	0	4	0
Queens Park Rangers	Total		40	0	3	0	3	0	0	0	46	13
Cambridge United	2022–23	League One	6	1	0	0	0	0	0	0	6	1
Cambridge United	2023–24	League One	31	1	2	0	1	0	2	0	36	1
Cambridge United	Total		37	2	2	0	1	0	2	0	42	2
Career total			164	10	8	0	6	0	16	5	178	15

=== International ===
As of match played 20 March 2019

National team	Year	Apps	Goals
Wales	2018	2	0
Wales	2019	1	0
Total		3	0

== Honours ==
Coventry City

- EFL Trophy: 2016–17

Individual

- Toulon Tournament Best XI: 2017
