= Lewis Simper =

English footballer

Personal information
- Full name: Lewis Matthew Simper
- Date of birth: 3 September 2001 (age 25)
- Place of birth: Cambridge, England
- Height: 1.81 m (5 ft 11 in)
- Position: Midfielder

Team information
- Current team: Walsall
- Number: 10

Youth career
- –2020: Cambridge United

Senior career*
Years	Team	Apps	(Gls)
2020–2024	Cambridge United	13	(0)
2020	→ St Neots Town (loan)	7	(0)
2020	→ St Neots Town (loan)	3	(1)
2020–2021	→ Concord Rangers (loan)	7	(2)
2021	→ Yeovil Town (loan)	1	(0)
2021–2022	→ Concord Rangers (loan)	17	(3)
2023	→ Woking (loan)	2	(0)
2023	→ Wealdstone (loan)	6	(0)
2024–2026	Sutton United	85	(19)
2026–	Walsall	13	(1)
- * Club domestic league appearances and goals as of 12:04, 11 July 2026 (UTC)

Lewis Matthew Simper (born 3 September 2001) is an English professional footballer who plays as a midfielder for EFL League Two club Walsall

== Club career ==
=== Cambridge United ===
Born in Cambridge, Simper played for local Cambridge team Ely Crusaders before he played at a Cambridge United trial evening. Simper joined Cambridge United at 6 years old, earning his first professional contract with the club in Janruary 2020. He made his debut for the club in an EFL Trophy win against Fulham Under-21s. On 18 June 2021 Simper signed a one year contract renewal after his first loan at Concord Rangers in which he helped the club to the 2020 FA Trophy final in which he played a full 90 minutes in the loss.

Simper made his Cambridge league debut in a start against Morecambe on the 9 April 2022 in which Cambridge won 2–1. In August 2022 Simper signed a new 3 year deal with Cambridge after loans at Yeovil Town and a second spell at Concord Rangers. Simper would score his first goal for the U's as the winner in an EFL Trophy clash against Ipswich Town. Simper would spent the next 2 seasons as a fringe player for Cambridge and having loans at Woking and Wealdstone.

Simper was put on the transfer list by Cambridge after the 2023–24 season.

=== Sutton United ===
On 27 June 2024 Simper joined National League side Sutton United on an undisclosed fee. Simper made his debut for Sutton on the opening day of the season in a 1–1 draw against Tamworth. At the end of the season Simper jointly won player of the season with Jack Sims and also won goal of the season for a 35 yard volley against Gateshead.

Simper would make his 100th Sutton appearance against Woking on 18 February 2026. At the end of his second season Simper would win players player of the season after scoring 14 goals and goal of the season for a strike against Gateshead for the second year in a row.

It was announced in Sutton's released and retained list that Simper would not be staying at the club following the expiration of his contract.

=== Walsall ===
On 22 June 2026 Simper joined League Two club Walsall becoming their second summer signing. Simper scored his first goal for the club in a 6–1 loss in the EFL Trophy against Stevenage.

== Career statistics ==
As of match played 4 November 2026

Appearances and goals by club, season and competition
Club	Season	League			FA Cup		EFL Cup		Other		Total	
Club	Season	Division	Apps	Goals	Apps	Goals	Apps	Goals	Apps	Goals	Apps	Goals
Cambridge United	2019–20	League Two	0	0	0	0	0	0	0	0	0	0
Cambridge United	2020–21	League Two	0	0	0	0	0	0	1 (Note: Appearance(s) in EFL Trophy)	0	1	0
Cambridge United	2021–22	League One	2	0	0	0	0	0	2	0	4	0
Cambridge United	2022–23	League One	9	0	2	0	2	0	3	1	16	1
Cambridge United	2023–24	League One	2	0	0	0	1	0	3	1	6	1
Cambridge United	Total		13	0	2	0	3	0	9	2	27	2
St Neots Town (loan)	2019–20	SL Division One Central	7	0	0	0	—		0	0	7	0
St Neots Town (loan)	2020–21	SL Division One Central	3	1	0	0	—		1 (Note: Appearance in FA Trophy)	1	4	2
Concord Rangers (loan)	2020–21	National League South	7	2	0	0	—		1 (Note: Appearance in 2019–20 FA Trophy)	0	8	2
Yeovil Town (loan)	2021–22	National League	1	0	1	0	—		0	0	2	0
Concord Rangers (loan)	2021–22	National League South	17	3	—		—		0	0	17	3
Woking (loan)	2022–23	National League	2	0	0	0	—		0	0	2	0
Wealdstone (loan)	2022–23	National League	6	0	0	0	—		0	0	6	0
Sutton United	2024–25	National League	40	7	1	0	—		9 (Note: Four appearances in FA Trophy, five appearances and two goals in National League Cup)	2	50	9
Sutton United	2025–26	National League	45	12	4	1	—		4 (Note: One appearance in FA Trophy, two appearances and one goal in National League Cup, one appearance in Surrey Senior Cup)	1	53	14
Sutton United	Total		85	19	5	1	—		13	3	103	23
Walsall	2026–27	League Two	13	1	0	0	2	0	2	1	17	2
Career total			154	26	8	1	5	0	26	7	193	34

== Honours ==
Concord Rangers

- FA Trophy: runner-up 2019–20

Sutton United

- National League Cup: runner-up 2024–25
