= Kai Yearn =

English footballer (born 2005)

Personal information
- Date of birth: 21 May 2005 (age 21)
- Place of birth: Cambridge, England
- Height: 1.80 m (5 ft 11 in)
- Position: Midfielder

Youth career
- –2021: Cambridge United

Senior career*
Years	Team	Apps	(Gls)
2021–2024	Cambridge United	2	(0)
2022	→ Chelmsford City (loan)	14	(1)
2023	→ Chelmsford City (loan)	6	(0)
2023	→ King's Lynn Town (loan)	1	(0)
2024–2026	Coventry City	0	(0)
2025–2026	→ Maidenhead United (loan)	9	(0)
2026	→ Chesham United (loan)	19	(9)
- * Club domestic league appearances and goals as of 18:05, 15 May 2026 (UTC)

Kai Yearn (born 21 May 2005) is an English professional footballer who most recently played as a midfielder for Premier League club Coventry City.

== Club career ==
=== Cambridge United ===
On 31 August 2021, Yearn made his debut for Cambridge United, becoming youngest player to ever score for the club when he scored the fourth in a 4–1 EFL Trophy victory over Oxford United.

On 12 September 2022, National League South side Chelmsford City announced the signing of Yearn on loan. On 31 December 2022, Yearn was recalled from his loan at Chelmsford. On 13 January 2023, Yearn returned to Chelmsford on loan after featuring twice on the bench for Cambridge. On 2 March 2023, Yearn was once again recalled from his loan by Cambridge. During the 2022–23 season, Yearn was part of the Cambridge side that progressed to the quarter-finals of the FA Youth Cup, scoring in Cambridge's eventual 3–2 loss away at Arsenal in a run that surpassed Cambridge's previous best run in the competition.

On 9 September 2023, Yearn joined National League North club King's Lynn Town on a one-month youth loan deal.

Following the conclusion of the 2023–24 season, Yearn departed Cambridge United.

=== Coventry City ===
On 3 July 2024, Yearn signed for Championship side Coventry City, joining up with the club's development side.

On 29 August 2025, Yearn joined Maidenhead United on loan until 5 January 2026. On 21 January, he joined Chesham United on a one-month loan.

He was released upon the expiry of his contract at the end of the 2025–26 season.

== International career ==
In March 2021, Yearn was called up to the England under-16 squad. In August 2021, Yearn was selected to represent England U17.

== Career statistics ==
As of end of 2025–26 season

Appearances and goals by club, season and competition
Club	Season	League			FA Cup		EFL Cup		Other		Total	
Club	Season	Division	Apps	Goals	Apps	Goals	Apps	Goals	Apps	Goals	Apps	Goals
Cambridge United	2021–22	League One	1	0	0	0	0	0	4 (Note: Appearance(s) in EFL Trophy)	1	5	1
Cambridge United	2022–23	League One	1	0	0	0	0	0	0	0	1	0
Cambridge United	2023–24	League One	0	0	0	0	0	0	1	1	1	1
Cambridge United	Total		2	0	0	0	0	0	5	2	7	2
Chelmsford City (loan)	2022–23	National League South	20	1	0	0	–		0	0	20	1
King's Lynn Town (loan)	2023–24	National League North	1	0	2	0	–		0	0	3	0
Coventry City	2024–25	Championship	0	0	0	0	0	0	0	0	0	0
Coventry City	2025–26	Championship	0	0	0	0	0	0	0	0	0	0
Coventry City	Total		0	0	0	0	0	0	0	0	0	0
Maidenhead United (loan)	2025–26	National League South	9	0	1	0	–		3 (Note: One appearance in FA Trophy, two appearances and one goal in Berks & Bucks Senior Cup)	1	13	1
Chesham United (loan)	2025–26	National League South	19	9	—		—		0	0	19	9
Career total			51	10	3	0	0	0	8	3	62	13
