= Zeno Ibsen Rossi =

English footballer (born 2000)

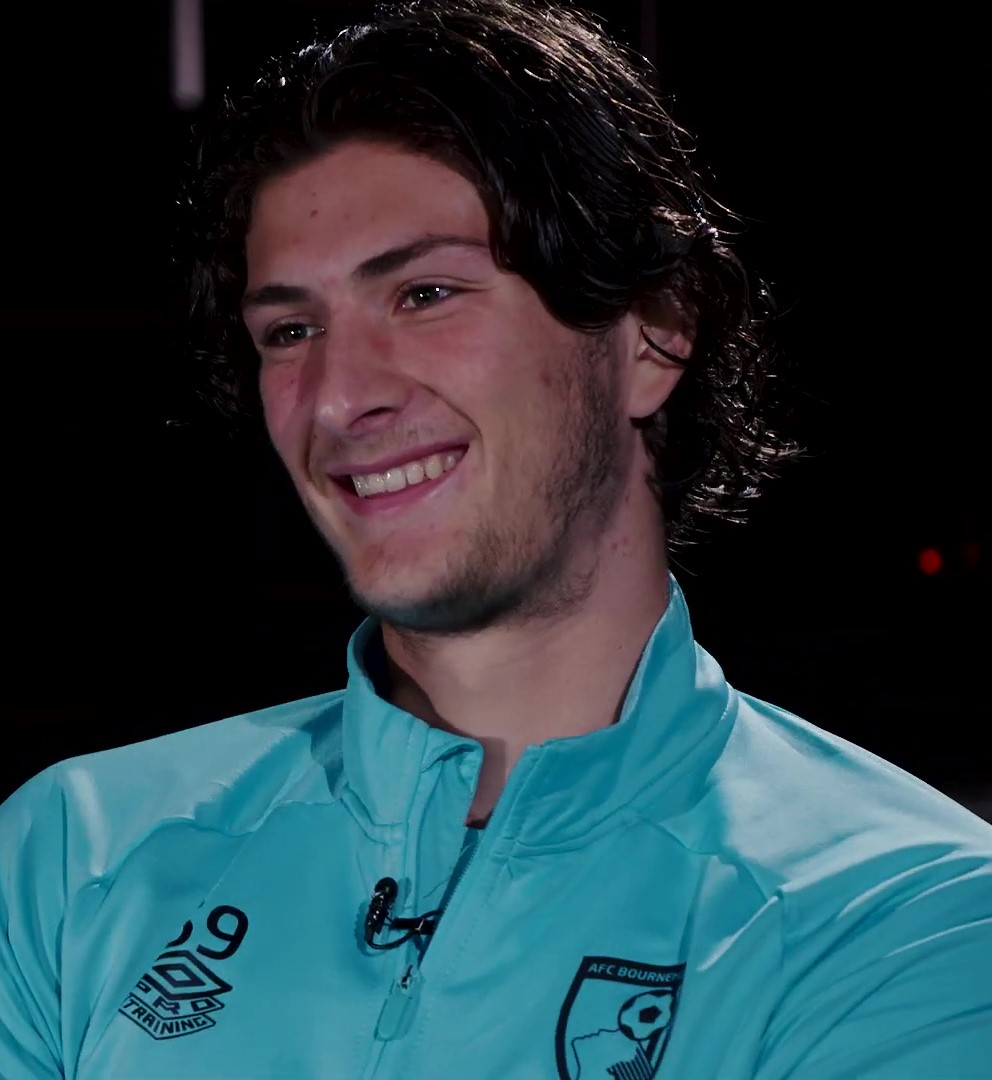
- Ibsen Rossi in 2021

Personal information
- Full name: Zeno Ibsen Rossi
- Date of birth: 28 October 2000 (age 26)
- Place of birth: Streatham, England
- Height: 6 ft 4 in (1.94 m)
- Position: Defender

Team information
- Current team: Glentoran
- Number: 4

Youth career
- 2010–2016: Brentford
- 2016–2017: Southampton
- 2017–2020: AFC Bournemouth

Senior career*
Years	Team	Apps	(Gls)
2020–2022	AFC Bournemouth	4	(0)
2020–2021	→ Kilmarnock (loan)	14	(0)
2022	→ Dundee (loan)	3	(0)
2022–2026	Cambridge United	37	(0)
2026	→ Shelbourne (loan)	9	(1)
2026–	Glentoran	8	(0)
- * Club domestic league appearances and goals as of 20 November 2026 (UTC)

Zeno Ibsen Rossi (born 28 October 2000) is an English professional footballer who plays as a defender for NIFL Premiership club Glentoran.

== Early life ==
Ibsen Rossi was born in Streatham, Greater London and is of English and Italian descent.

== Career ==
Having spent time as a youngster with Brentford and Southampton, Ibsen Rossi then moved to AFC Bournemouth in 2017. At the end of the 2018–19 season, he signed his first professional contract.

On 15 July 2020, Ibsen Rossi joined Scottish Premiership club Kilmarnock on a season-long loan. He made his debut for the club on 29 August 2020, in a 4–0 home win against Dundee United.

On 31 July 2021, Ibsen Rossi made his competitive debut for AFC Bournemouth playing 90 minutes in the 5–0 home win against Milton Keynes Dons in EFL Cup. Ibsen Rossi was loaned to Dundee on 31 January 2022, although it took over a week for the deal to be confirmed by FIFA due to a "technical hitch". Ibsen Rossi would make his debut for Dundee in an away victory against Peterhead in the Scottish Cup. He would return to his parent club at the end of the season in May 2022.

On 18 July 2022, Ibsen Rossi joined EFL League One club Cambridge United.

On 22 February 2026, Ibsen Rossi signed for League of Ireland Premier Division club Shelbourne on loan until 30 June 2026.

On 9 July 2026, it was announced that Ibsen Rossi's contract with Cambridge United had been terminated by mutual consent. Later that same day, he signed a long-term contract with NIFL Premiership club Glentoran. He made his debut the same day he signed, scoring in a 2–1 defeat at home to Latvian side RFS in the UEFA Conference League.

== Career statistics ==
As of match played 20 November 2026

Appearances and goals by club, season and competition
Club	Season	League			National cup (Note: Includes FA Cup, Scottish Cup & Irish Cup)		League cup (Note: Includes EFL Cup, Scottish League Cup & Northern Ireland Football League Cup)		Other		Total	
Club	Season	Division	Apps	Goals	Apps	Goals	Apps	Goals	Apps	Goals	Apps	Goals
AFC Bournemouth	2020-21	Championship	0	0	0	0	0	0	0	0	0	0
AFC Bournemouth	2021–22	Championship	4	0	1	0	2	0	—		7	0
AFC Bournemouth	Total		4	0	1	0	2	0	0	0	7	0
Kilmarnock (loan)	2020–21	Scottish Premiership	14	0	2	1	2	0	2 (Note: Appearances in Scottish Premiership play-offs)	0	20	1
Dundee (loan)	2021–22	Scottish Premiership	3	0	1	0	—		—		4	0
Cambridge United	2022–23	League One	6	0	1	0	2	0	3	0	12	0
Cambridge United	2023–24	League One	11	0	1	0	1	0	2	0	15	0
Cambridge United	2024–25	League One	15	0	1	0	1	0	4	0	21	0
Cambridge United	2025–26	League Two	5	0	1	0	2	0	4	0	12	0
Cambridge United	Total		37	0	4	0	6	0	13	0	60	0
Shelbourne (loan)	2026	LOI Premier Division	9	1	—		—		0	0	9	1
Glentoran	2026–27	NIFL Premiership	8	0	0	0	0	0	3	1	11	1
Career total			75	1	8	1	10	0	18	1	111	3
