= Gassan Ahadme =

Footballer (born 2000)

Personal information
- Full name: Gassan Ahadme Yahyai
- Date of birth: 17 November 2000 (age 26)
- Place of birth: Vic, Spain
- Height: 1.84 m (6 ft 0 in)
- Position: Second striker

Team information
- Current team: Cambridge United (on loan from Charlton Athletic)
- Number: 14

Youth career
- Gimnástic Manresa
- 2019–2020: Norwich City

Senior career*
Years	Team	Apps	(Gls)
2020–2022	Norwich City	0	(0)
2021	→ Real Oviedo B (loan)	6	(0)
2021–2022	→ Portsmouth (loan)	5	(0)
2022	Burton Albion	20	(6)
2022–2024	Ipswich Town	6	(0)
2023	→ Burton Albion (loan)	7	(1)
2023–2024	→ Cambridge United (loan)	29	(11)
2024–	Charlton Athletic	19	(1)
2025–2026	→ Stevenage (loan)	13	(1)
2026–	→ Cambridge United (loan)	10	(3)
- * Club domestic league appearances and goals as of 17:10, 21 November 2026 (UTC)

Gassan Ahadme Yahyai (born 17 November 2000) is a professional footballer who plays as a second-striker for EFL League One club Cambridge United on loan from EFL Championship club Charlton Athletic. Born in Spain, he represented Morocco at youth international level.

== Club career ==
Born in Vic, Barcelona, Catalonia, Ahadme began his career with Norwich City.

Ahadme spent time on loan at Real Oviedo B.

He moved on loan to Portsmouth in July 2021. He scored his first goal for the club on 9 November 2021 in an EFL Trophy tie against Crystal Palace U21s.

He signed for Burton Albion in January 2022. He scored his first goal for the club in a 2–1 loss to former club Portsmouth on 8 February 2022. Ahadme would later score the fastest goal for Burton Albion in the EFL in a 4–3 defeat to Cambridge United, scoring in 11 seconds.

Ahadme joined Ipswich Town on 1 September 2022. He scored his first goal for the club in an FA Cup tie against Buxton on 27 November 2022.

He returned on loan to Burton Albion in January 2023.

He moved on loan to Cambridge United in June 2023.

On 4 July 2024, Ahadme joined Charlton Athletic on a four-year contract.

On 14 August 2025, Ahadme joined Stevenage on a season-long loan. He scored on his Stevenage debut in a 2–0 home win over Northampton on 16 August 2025.

On 1 July 2026, Ahadme re-joined Cambridge United on a season-long loan.

== International career ==
Born in Spain, Ahadme represented Morocco at youth international level.

== Career statistics ==
As of match played 21 November 2026

Appearances and goals by club, season and competition
Club	Season	Division	League		National cup (Note: Includes FA Cup)		League cup (Note: Includes EFL Cup)		Other		Total	
Club	Season	Division	Apps	Goals	Apps	Goals	Apps	Goals	Apps	Goals	Apps	Goals
Norwich City U23s	2019–20	—			—		—		2 (Note: Appearance(s) in EFL Trophy)	1	2	1
Norwich City	2020–21	Championship	0	0	0	0	0	0	0	0	0	0
Norwich City	2021–22	Premier League	0	0	0	0	0	0	0	0	0	0
Norwich City	Total		0	0	0	0	0	0	0	0	0	0
Real Oviedo B (loan)	2020–21	Segunda División B	6	0	0	0	—		—		6	0
Portsmouth (loan)	2021–22	League One	5	0	1	0	1	0	3	1	10	1
Burton Albion	2021–22	League One	14	3	0	0	0	0	0	0	14	3
Burton Albion	2022–23	League One	6	3	0	0	1	0	1	2	8	5
Burton Albion	Total		20	6	0	0	1	0	1	2	22	8
Ipswich Town	2022–23	League One	6	0	2	1	0	0	0	0	8	1
Ipswich Town	2023–24	Championship	0	0	0	0	0	0	0	0	0	0
Ipswich Town	Total		6	0	2	1	0	0	0	0	8	1
Burton Albion (loan)	2022–23	League One	7	1	0	0	0	0	0	0	7	1
Cambridge United (loan)	2023–24	League One	29	11	1	1	1	0	2	1	33	13
Charlton Athletic	2024–25	League One	19	1	3	3	0	0	1	0	23	4
Charlton Athletic	2025–26	Championship	0	0	0	0	0	0	—		0	0
Charlton Athletic	2026–27	Championship	0	0	0	0	0	0	—		0	0
Charlton Athletic	Total		19	1	3	3	0	0	1	0	23	4
Stevenage (loan)	2025–26	League One	13	1	1	0	—		3	3	17	4
Cambridge United (loan)	2026–27	League One	10	3	0	0	1	0	1	1	12	4
Career total			115	23	8	5	4	0	13	9	140	37
