= George Williams (footballer, born 1993) =

English footballer

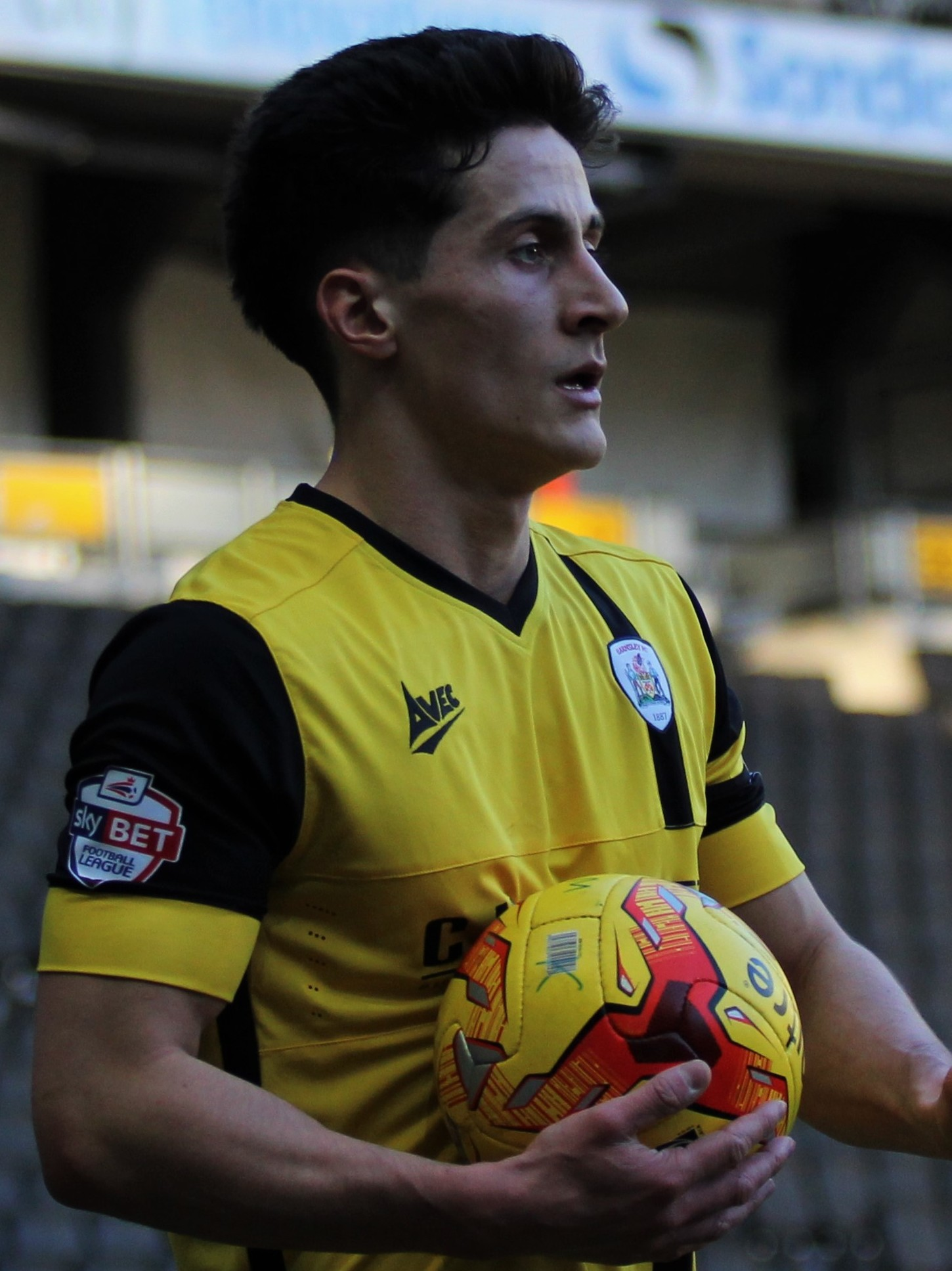
- Williams in 2015

Personal information
- Full name: George Benjamin Williams
- Date of birth: 14 April 1993 (age 33)
- Place of birth: Hillingdon, England
- Height: 5 ft 10 in (1.78 m)
- Position: Defender

Team information
- Current team: Hednesford Town

Youth career
- 2010–2012: Milton Keynes Dons

Senior career*
Years	Team	Apps	(Gls)
- Loughborough University
2013–2014	Worcester City	55	(2)
2014–2016	Barnsley	23	(1)
2015	→ Barrow (loan)	15	(0)
2016–2021	Milton Keynes Dons	142	(4)
2021	Bristol Rovers	26	(0)
2021–2023	Cambridge United	69	(1)
2023–2025	Mansfield Town	32	(0)
2026–	Hednesford Town	0	(0)
- * Club domestic league appearances and goals as of 18:51, 17 March 2026 (UTC)

George Benjamin Williams (born 14 April 1993) is an English professional footballer who plays as a defender for National League North club Hednesford Town.

== Career ==
=== Worcester City ===
Williams began his career as an academy scholar with Milton Keynes Dons before leaving to play for Midland Football League side Loughborough University, where he was studying. He joined Worcester City in the Conference North in August 2013, and on 9 November 2014 was a member of the team that infamously defeated League One side Coventry City 2–1 in an FA Cup first round tie.

=== Barnsley ===
Williams joined Barnsley on 22 December 2014. He made his professional debut on 26 December 2014 in a 1–0 defeat to Preston North End. On 29 May 2016, Williams featured in Barnsley's 3–1 League One play-off final victory over Millwall, achieving promotion to the EFL Championship. However, on 15 June 2016, Williams was released by the club.

=== Milton Keynes Dons ===
On 28 June 2016, Williams returned to Milton Keynes Dons on a two-year deal having previously played for the club's academy side. He made his debut for the club on 6 August 2016 away to Shrewsbury Town, coming on as a 90th-minute substitute, and on 18 October 2016 scored his first goal for the club with a 23rd-minute header in a 3–3 home draw with Bristol Rovers. At the end of his first season back at the club, Williams was awarded both the club's 2016–17 Player of the Year and Players' Player of the Year awards, and in July 2017 signed a new long-term deal keeping him at the club until June 2020.

=== Bristol Rovers ===
On 21 January 2021 with just six months remaining on his contract, Williams joined Bristol Rovers for an undisclosed fee. He made his debut that weekend in a 2–0 away defeat to Oxford United, coming off of the bench to replace Abu Ogogo in the 67' minute.

=== Cambridge United ===
On 25 June 2021, Williams joined League One side Cambridge United on a free transfer, returning to the division following Bristol Rovers' relegation. He made his Cambridge debut against Oxford United in a 1-1 draw.

He was released at the end of the 2022–23 season.

=== Mansfield Town ===
On 17 July 2023, Williams signed for League Two club Mansfield Town on an initial one-year deal with the option for a further year.

=== Hednesford Town ===
On 17 March 2026, Williams joined Northern Premier League Premier Division club Hednesford Town.

== Career statistics ==
As of end of 2024–25 season

Appearances and goals by club, season and competition
Club	Season	League			FA Cup		League Cup		Other		Total	
Club	Season	Division	Apps	Goals	Apps	Goals	Apps	Goals	Apps	Goals	Apps	Goals
Worcester City	2013–14	Conference North	38	1	0	0	—		3 (Note: Appearances in FA Trophy)	0	41	1
Worcester City	2014–15	Conference North	17	1	4	0	—		0	0	21	1
Worcester City	Total		55	2	4	0	—		3	0	62	2
Barnsley	2014–15	League One	4	0	0	0	0	0	0	0	4	0
Barnsley	2015–16	League One	19	1	0	0	0	0	4 (Note: Appearances in Football League Trophy.) (Note: 3 appearances in Football League One play-offs.)	0	24	1
Barnsley	Total		23	1	0	0	0	0	4	0	28	1
Barrow (loan)	2015–16	National League	15	0	0	0	—		—		15	0
Milton Keynes Dons	2016–17	League One	33	2	3	0	2	0	4 (Note: Appearance(s) in EFL Trophy)	0	42	2
Milton Keynes Dons	2017–18	League One	43	1	4	0	1	0	4	0	52	1
Milton Keynes Dons	2018–19	League Two	30	0	1	0	2	0	1	0	34	0
Milton Keynes Dons	2019–20	League One	28	1	0	0	2	0	4	0	34	1
Milton Keynes Dons	2020–21	League One	8	0	2	0	0	0	2	0	12	0
Milton Keynes Dons	Total		142	4	10	0	7	0	15	0	174	4
Bristol Rovers	2020–21	League One	26	0	—		—		0	0	26	0
Cambridge United	2021–22	League One	40	1	5	0	2	1	2	0	49	2
Cambridge United	2022–23	League One	29	0	2	0	2	0	2	0	35	0
Cambridge United	Total		69	1	7	0	4	1	4	0	84	2
Mansfield Town	2023–24	League Two	21	0	0	0	1	0	3	0	25	0
Mansfield Town	2024–25	League One	11	0	1	0	1	0	1	0	14	0
Mansfield Town	Total		32	0	1	0	2	0	4	0	39	0
Career total			362	8	22	0	13	1	24	0	428	9

== Honours ==
Barnsley

- Football League One play-offs: 2016
- Football League Trophy: 2015–16

Milton Keynes Dons

- EFL League Two third-place promotion: 2018–19

Mansfield Town

- EFL League Two third-place promotion: 2023–24

Individual

- Milton Keynes Dons Player of the Year: 2016–17
- Milton Keynes Dons Players' Player of the Year: 2016–17
