= 2026–27 Cambridge United F.C. season =

Cambridge United
2026–27 season
- Owner: Paul Barry (75.01%), Mark Green (24.99%)
- Chairman: Shaun Grady
- Manager: Neil Harris
- Stadium: Abbey Stadium
- League One: 8th
- FA Cup: First round (eliminated by Bristol Rovers
- EFL Cup: Second round (eliminated by Millwall)
- Top goalscorer: League: Ben Knight (4); All: Ben Knight (5)
- Highest home attendance: 7,819 (vs AFC Wimbledon, 26 September 2026, EFL League One)
- Lowest home attendance: 888 (vs Northampton Town, 6 October 2026, EFL Trophy)
- Average home league attendance: 7,189
| Home colours | Away colours |

The 2026–27 season is the 115th season in the history of Cambridge United Football Club, and their first season back in League One since the 2024–25 season following promotion from League Two in the preceding season. In addition to the domestic league, the club also participate in the FA Cup, the EFL Cup and the EFL Trophy.

== Transfers and contracts ==
=== In ===
| Date | Pos. | Player | From | Fee | Ref. |
|---|---|---|---|---|---|
| 15 June 2026 | LW | (England) Isaac Heath | (England) Everton | Undisclosed | |
| 1 July 2026 (Note: The transfer was announced on 10 June, and would become official on July 1 once Stead's contract at Barnet expired.) | CF | (England) Callum Stead | (England) Barnet | Free | |
| 3 July 2026 | CB | (Germany) Patrick Bauer | (England) AFC Wimbledon | Free | |
| 12 August 2026 | GK | (England) Gabriel Breeze | (England) Carlisle United | Undisclosed | |
| 27 August 2026 | CB | (Republic of Ireland) Cathal Heffernan | (England) Harrogate Town | Undisclosed | |

=== Loaned in ===
| Date | Pos. | Player | From | Loaned until | Ref. |
|---|---|---|---|---|---|
| 1 July 2026 | CF | (Morocco) Gassan Ahadme | (England) Charlton Athletic | End of Season | |
| 21 July 2026 | CB | (England) Callum Perry | (England) Coventry City | End of Season | |
| 27 August 2026 | RW | (England) Ra'ees Bangura-Williams | (England) Millwall | End of Season | |
| 28 August 2026 | CM | (England) Owen Moxon | (England) Stockport County | End of Season | |
| 1 September 2026 | RB | (Republic of Ireland) Sam Curtis | (England) Sheffield United | End of Season | |

=== Loaned out ===
| Date | Pos. | Player | To | Loaned until | Ref. |
|---|---|---|---|---|---|
| 19 September 2026 | GK | (England) JJ Briggs | (England) Cray Wanderers | 2 January 2027 | |
| 2 October 2026 | GK | (Japan) Zakariah Takagi | (England) St Ives Town | 31 October 2026 | |
| 2 October 2026 | CB | (England) Jordan Yakubu | (England) St Ives Town | 31 October 2026 | |
| 6 October 2026 | CF | (England) Ryan Loft | (England) Hornchurch | 6 January 2027 | |
| 10 October 2026 | GK | (Wales) Ben Hughes | (England) Braintree Town | 3 January 2027 | |
| 22 October 2026 | CF | (England) Dan Efobi | (England) Enfield Town | 3 January 2027 | |
| 21 November 2026 | CB | (England) Jamie Murefu | (England) Newmarket Town | 21 December 2026 | |

=== Out ===
| Date | Pos. | Player | To | Fee | Ref. |
|---|---|---|---|---|---|
| 19 June 2026 | CF | (England) George Munday | (England) Brighton & Hove Albion | Undisclosed | |
| 28 August 2026 | CB | (England) Mamadou Jobe | (England) Stockport County | Undisclosed | |

=== Released / Out of Contract ===
| Date | Pos. | Player | Subsequent club | Join date | Ref. |
|---|---|---|---|---|---|
| 30 June 2026 | LWB | (England) James Brophy | (England) Gillingham | 1 July 2026 | |
| 30 June 2026 | RB | (England) James Gibbons | (England) Notts County | 1 July 2026 | |
| 30 June 2026 | LB | (England) Ben Purrington | (England) Bristol Rovers | 1 July 2026 | |
| 30 June 2026 | CF | (England) Jahrel McKoy | (England) Wycombe Wanderers | 2 July 2026 | |
| 30 June 2026 | GK | (England) Blade Earley | (England) Aston Villa | 9 July 2026 | |
| 30 June 2026 | CF | (England) Jahkyah Ebanks-Blake | (England) Huddersfield Town | 28 July 2026 | |
| 30 June 2026 | CB | (England) Michael Morrison | Retired | | |
| 30 June 2026 | CB | (England) Dempsey Crace | | | |
| 30 June 2026 | RB | (England) Harry Dawson | | | |
| 30 June 2026 | CAM | (England) Ryan Gray | | | |
| 30 June 2026 | CF | (Democratic Republic of the Congo) Elias Kachunga | | | |
| 30 June 2026 | CM | (England) Lennon King | | | |
| 30 June 2026 | CF | (Seychelles) Samuel Okolie | | | |
| 30 June 2026 | CM | (England) Korey Smith | | | |
| 30 June 2026 | CB | (England) Zak Sowden-Fletcher | | | |
| 9 July 2026 | CB | (England) Zeno Ibsen Rossi | (Northern Ireland) Glentoran | 9 July 2026 | |

=== New Contract ===
| Date | Pos. | Player | Contract until | Ref. |
|---|---|---|---|---|
| 6 May 2026 | GK | (England) JJ Briggs | 30 June 2027 | |
| 6 May 2026 | GK | (England) Jake Eastwood | 30 June 2027 | |
| 6 May 2026 | CF | (England) George Munday | 30 June 2027 | |
| 30 June 2026 | CF | (Northern Ireland) Shayne Lavery | 30 June 2027 | |
| 1 July 2026 | RB | (Republic of Ireland) Shane McLoughlin | 30 June 2027 | |
| 25 September 2026 | CF | (England) Daniel Efobi | Undisclosed (Note: First professional contract) | |
| 10 November 2026 | CM | (England) Daniel Herd | Undisclosed | |

== Pre-season and friendlies ==
On 18 May, Cambridge announced a five-day pre-season training camp in Murcia, Spain between 21–25 July with a friendly against Preston North End. Four days later, two UK based friendlies were confirmed against cross-city rivals Cambridge City and Northampton Town. Also added to the schedule were behind closed doors matches against Southend United, Braintree Town and Norwich City.

Win Draw Loss Fixtures

| 11 July 2026 Friendly | Cambridge City | 1–3 | Cambridge United | Sawston |
| 13:00 BST | Randell 6' | Report | Appéré 23'; McDermott 45'; Knight 80' | Stadium: FWD-IP Community Stadium |

| 14 July 2026 Friendly | Cambridge United | 2-1 | Southend United | Cambridge |
| TBC BST | | | | Stadium: Clare College Sports Ground; Attendance: 0 (BCD) |

| 24 July 2026 Friendly | Preston North End | 0–1 | Cambridge United | San Pedro del Pinatar, Murcia, Spain |
| 11:00 CEST | | Report | Bauer (yellow card) 21'; Heath 30' | Stadium: Pinatar Arena |

| 28 July 2026 Friendly | Cambridge United | 0–0 | Northampton Town | Cambridge |
| 19:30 BST | | Report | | Stadium: Cledara Abbey Stadium; Attendance: 1,705 (103 away fans); Referee: Neil Hair |

| 4 August 2026 Friendly | Norwich City | 0–0 | Cambridge United | Colney |
| 16:00 BST | | Report | | Stadium: Lotus Training Centre; Attendance: 0 (BCD) |

== Competitions ==
=== Overall record ===
| Competition | First match | Last match | Starting round | Final position | Record | | | | | | | |
| Competition | First match | Last match | Starting round | Final position | Pld | W | D | L | GF | GA | GD | Win % |
|---|---|---|---|---|---|---|---|---|---|---|---|---|
| League One | 15 August 2026 | TBD | Matchday 1 | TBD | 14 | 5 | 6 | 3 | 21 | 21 | +0 | 35.71 |
| FA Cup | 6 November 2026 | 6 November 2026 | First round | First round | 1 | 0 | 0 | 1 | 0 | 2 | −2 | 0.00 |
| EFL Cup | 8 August 2026 | 25 August 2026 | First round | Second round | 2 | 1 | 0 | 1 | 2 | 2 | +0 | 50.00 |
| EFL Trophy | 22 September 2026 | TBD | Group stage | TBD | 3 | 3 | 0 | 0 | 12 | 2 | +10 | 100.00 |
| Total | | | | | 20 | 9 | 6 | 5 | 35 | 27 | +8 | 45.00 |

Last updated: 7 November 2026
Source: Soccerway

=== League One ===
==== League table ====
| Pos | Team | Pld | W | D | L | GF | GA | GD | Pts |
|---|---|---|---|---|---|---|---|---|---|
| 9 | Milton Keynes Dons | 15 | 5 | 7 | 3 | 29 | 23 | +6 | 22 |
| 10 | Leicester City | 14 | 6 | 4 | 4 | 23 | 19 | +4 | 22 |
| 11 | Cambridge United | 15 | 5 | 6 | 4 | 21 | 24 | −3 | 21 |
| 12 | Leyton Orient | 14 | 6 | 2 | 6 | 23 | 15 | +8 | 20 |
| 13 | Mansfield Town | 14 | 5 | 5 | 4 | 21 | 19 | +2 | 20 |

Updated to match(es) played on 21 November 2026. Source: EFL Official Website
Rules for classification: 1) Points; 2) Goal difference; 3) Number of goals scored; 4) Head-to-head results; 5) Wins; 6) Away goals; 7) Penalty points (sec 9.5); 8) 12-point sending off offences

==== Results summary ====
| Overall | | | | | | | | Home | | | | | | Away | | | | | |
| Pld | W | D | L | GF | GA | GD | Pts | W | D | L | GF | GA | GD | W | D | L | GF | GA | GD |
|---|---|---|---|---|---|---|---|---|---|---|---|---|---|---|---|---|---|---|---|
| 15 | 5 | 6 | 4 | 21 | 24 | −3 | 21 | 3 | 2 | 3 | 12 | 14 | −2 | 2 | 4 | 1 | 9 | 10 | −1 |

Last updated: 21 November 2026.
Source: Soccerway

==== Results by round ====
| Round | 1 | 2 | 3 | 4 | 5 | 6 | 7 | 8 | 10 | 11 | 12 | 13 | 9^{1} | 14 | 16 | 17 | 18 | 19 | 20 | 21 | 22 | 23 | 24 | 25 | 26 | 27 | 28 | 15^{2} | 29 | 30 | 31 | 32 | 33 |
|---|---|---|---|---|---|---|---|---|---|---|---|---|---|---|---|---|---|---|---|---|---|---|---|---|---|---|---|---|---|---|---|---|---|
| Ground | H | A | H | A | A | H | A | H | H | A | H | H | A | A | H | A | H | A | H | A | H | H | A | H | A | A | H | A | A | H | H | A | H |
| Result | W | D | L | W | D | W | D | D | W | W | D | L | D | L | L | | | | | | | | | | | | | | | | | | |
| Position | 5 | 5 | 10 | 6 | 6 | 4 | 5 | 5 | 5 | 5 | 4 | 6 | 7 | 8 | 11 | | | | | | | | | | | | | | | | | | |
| Points | 3 | 4 | 4 | 7 | 8 | 11 | 12 | 13 | 16 | 19 | 20 | 20 | 21 | 21 | 21 | | | | | | | | | | | | | | | | | | |

Source: EFL
A = Away; H = Home; W = Win; D = Draw; L = Loss; P = Postponed
Notes:
- ^{1} Matchday 9 (vs. Sheffield Wednesday) was postponed due to international call-ups.
- ^{1} Matchday 15 (vs. Luton Town) was postponed due to international call-ups.

==== Matches ====
On 25 June, the League One fixtures were revealed.

Win Draw Loss Fixtures

| 15 August 2026 1 | Cambridge United | 3–2 | Wigan Athletic | Cambridge |
| 15:00 BST | Watts 3'; Appéré 34'; Heath 52'; Bradshaw (yellow card) 90+5' | Report | Perkins 69'; Higgins 73' | Stadium: Cledara Abbey Stadium; Attendance: 7,506; Referee: Alex Chilowicz |

| 22 August 2026 2 | Bromley | 1–1 | Cambridge United | Bromley |
| 15:00 BST | Adeboyejo 81'; Headman (yellow card) 90+4' | Report | Ball (yellow card) 61'; Knight 67'; Lavery (yellow card) 90+4' | Stadium: Copperjax Community Stadium; Attendance: 4,938; Referee: Kirsty Dowle |

| 29 August 2026 3 | Cambridge United | 1–2 | Huddersfield Town | Cambridge |
| 15:00 BST | Bradshaw (yellow card) 54', (goal) 80'; Bennett (yellow card) 89' | Report | Taylor 82', 89' (pen.) | Stadium: Cledara Abbey Stadium; Attendance: 7,041; Referee: Harrison Blair |

| 1 September 2026 4 | Bradford City | 1–2 | Cambridge United | Bradford |
| 15:00 BST | Pointon 76'; Connolly (yellow card) 79' | Report | Kaikai 58'; Knight 86' | Stadium: University of Bradford Stadium; Attendance: 18,098; Referee: Scott Oldham |

| 5 September 2026 5 | Burton Albion | 2–2 | Cambridge United | Burton upon Trent |
| 15:00 BST | Delap 19'; Krubally (yellow card) 31'; Tilt 90' | Report | Ball (yellow card) 16'; Ahadme 43', 65'; Perry (yellow card) 90+2' | Stadium: Pirelli Stadium; Attendance: 3,549; Referee: Elliott Swallow |

| 12 September 2026 6 | Cambridge United | 2–1 | Reading | Cambridge |
| 15:00 BST | Bennett 52'; Watts 62'; Ahadme (yellow card) 66'; Perry (yellow card) 80' | Report | Marriott 38'; Williams (yellow card) 90' | Stadium: Cledara Abbey Stadium; Attendance: 7,129 (1,086 away); Referee: Oliver Yates |

| 19 September 2026 7 | Oxford United | 1–1 | Cambridge United | Littlemore |
| 15:00 BST | Dembélé 15'; Brannagan (yellow card) 45+8' | Report | Curtis (yellow card) 50'; Knight 57', (yellow card) 63'; Lavery (yellow card) 66'; Heffernan (yellow card) 71'; Watts (yellow card) 87' | Stadium: Kassam Stadium; Attendance: 10,474; Referee: Thomas Kirk |

| 26 September 2026 8 | Cambridge United | 1–1 | AFC Wimbledon | Cambridge |
| 15:00 BST | Mpanzu (yellow card) 59'; Watts (yellow card) 62'; Bradshaw 90+1' | Report | Stockley 30'; Yiadom (yellow card) 52'; Seddon (yellow card) 90+5' | Stadium: Cledara Abbey Stadium; Attendance: 7,819 (1,031 away fans); Referee: Ben Toner |

| 10 October 2026 10 | Cambridge United | 1–0 | Blackpool | Cambridge |
| 15:15 BST | Ahadme 82'; Kaikai (yellow card) 86' | Report | Honeyman (red card) 6'; Casey (yellow card) 31'; Munroe (yellow card) 90+4' | Stadium: Cledara Abbey Stadium; Attendance: 7,295 (559 away fans); Referee: Lewis Sandoe |
Note: Kick-off was delayed fifteen minutes due to delays affecting supporters entering the stadium.

| 17 October 2026 11 | Barnsley | 1–2 | Cambridge United | Barnsley |
| 15:00 BST | Cleary (yellow card) 38'; Yoganathan 41'; Kay (yellow card) 43'; O'Riordan (yellow card) 46'; Adeyemo (yellow card) 76'; Shepherd (yellow card) 90+5' | Report | Bangura-Williams (yellow card) 48'; Lavery (yellow card) 50', (goal) 90+1'; Knight 52', (yellow card) 79' | Stadium: Oakwell; Referee: David Rock |

| 20 October 2026 12 | Cambridge United | 2–2 | Wycombe Wanderers | Cambridge |
| 19:45 BST | Lavery 78'; Bangura-Williams (yellow card) 84'; Taylor 90+2' (o.g.) | Report | Wareham 44', 61', (yellow card) 51'; Harvie (yellow card) 66'; Henderson (yellow card) 90+5' | Stadium: Cledara Abbey Stadium; Attendance: 5,776; Referee: Andrew Humphries |

| 24 October 2026 13 | Cambridge United | 2–3 | Plymouth Argyle | Cambridge |
| 15:00 BST | Kaikai (yellow card) 14', (goal) 57'; Lavery 87'; Heffernan (yellow card) 90+5' | Report | Mitchell (yellow card) 12'; Bakinson (yellow card) 29'; Appéré 41' (o.g.); Amaechi 50'; Pepple 74' (pen.) | Stadium: Cledara Abbey Stadium; Attendance: 7,756; Referee: Michael Barlow |

| 27 October 2026 9 | Sheffield Wednesday | 1–1 | Cambridge United | Owlerton |
| 19:45 GMT | Burstow 50'; James (yellow card) 65' | Report | Kaikai 67'; Lavery (yellow card) 90+5' | Stadium: Hillsborough; Attendance: 30,701; Referee: Dean Whitestone |
Note: Fixture was initially scheduled for 3 October, but was rearranged due to international call-ups.

| 31 October 2026 14 | Leyton Orient | 3–0 | Cambridge United | Leyton |
| 12:30 GMT | Edmonds-Green 32'; Kabia 50'; Connolly 62'; El Mizouni (yellow card) 78' | Report | Mpanzu (yellow card) 44'; Bradshaw (yellow card) 45+2'; Watts (yellow card) 70' | Stadium: BetWright Stadium; Attendance: 8,639; Referee: George Laflin |
Note: Fixture was initially scheduled for a 15:00 kick-off, but was brought forward for live Sky Sports broadcasting.

| 21 November 2026 16 | Cambridge United | 0–3 | Stockport County | Cambridge |
| 15:00 GMT | Bradshaw (yellow card) 49'; Ball (yellow card) 71'; Bennett (yellow card) 77' | Report | Pye (yellow card) 21'; Norwood 49'; Ennis 71'; Ahadme 80' (o.g.) | Stadium: Cledara Abbey Stadium; Attendance: 7,602; Referee: Simon Mather |

| 28 November 2026 17 | Peterborough United | v | Cambridge United | Peterborough |
| 12:30 GMT | | | | Stadium: Weston Homes Stadium |
Note: Fixture was initially scheduled for a 15:00 kick-off, but was brought forward for live Sky Sports broadcasting.

| 1 December 2026 18 | Cambridge United | v | Leicester City | Cambridge |
| 19:45 GMT | | | | Stadium: Cledara Abbey Stadium |

| 12 December 2026 19 | Milton Keynes Dons | v | Cambridge United | Denbigh |
| 15:00 GMT | | | | Stadium: Stadium MK |

| 18 December 2026 20 | Cambridge United | v | Stevenage | Cambridge |
| 19:45 GMT | | | | Stadium: Cledara Abbey Stadium |
Note: Fixture was initially scheduled for 19 December, but was brought forward to the evening prior.

| 26 December 2026 21 | Notts County | v | Cambridge United | Nottingham |
| 15:00 GMT | | | | Stadium: Meadow Lane |

| 29 December 2026 22 | Cambridge United | v | Doncaster Rovers | Cambridge |
| 19:45 GMT | | | | Stadium: Cledara Abbey Stadium |

| 2 January 2027 23 | Cambridge United | v | Mansfield Town | Cambridge |
| 15:00 GMT | | | | Stadium: Cledara Abbey Stadium |
Note: Fixture was initially scheduled for 1 January, but was rescheduled for the day after.

| 9 January 2027 24 | Stevenage | v | Cambridge United | Stevenage |
| 12:30 GMT | | | | Stadium: Stevenage FC Stadium |
Note: Fixture was initially scheduled for a 15:00 kick-off, but was brought forward for live Sky Sports broadcasting.

| 16 January 2027 25 | Cambridge United | v | Barnsley | Cambridge |
| 15:00 GMT | | | | Stadium: Cledara Abbey Stadium |

| 19 January 2027 26 | Wycombe Wanderers | v | Cambridge United | High Wycombe |
| 19:45 GMT | | | | Stadium: Adams Park |

| 25 January 2027 27 | Plymouth Argyle | v | Cambridge United | Plymouth |
| 20:00 GMT | | | | Stadium: Home Park |
Note: Fixture was initially scheduled for 23 January, but was pushed back to the Monday night for live Sky Sports broadcasting.

| 30 January 2027 28 | Cambridge United | v | Leyton Orient | Cambridge |
| 15:00 GMT | | | | Stadium: Cledara Abbey Stadium |

| 2 February 2027 15 | Luton Town | v | Cambridge United | Luton |
| 19:45 GMT | | | | Stadium: Kenilworth Road |
Note: Fixture was initially scheduled for 14 November, but was rearranged due to international call-ups.

| 6 February 2027 29 | Huddersfield Town | v | Cambridge United | Huddersfield |
| 15:00 GMT | | | | Stadium: Accu Stadium |

| 9 February 2027 30 | Cambridge United | v | Bradford City | Cambridge |
| 19:45 GMT | | | | Stadium: Cledara Abbey Stadium |

| 13 February 2027 31 | Cambridge United | v | Burton Albion | Cambridge |
| 15:00 GMT | | | | Stadium: Cledara Abbey Stadium |

| 20 February 2027 32 | Reading | v | Cambridge United | Reading |
| 15:00 GMT | | | | Stadium: Select Car Leasing Stadium |

| 27 February 2027 33 | Cambridge United | v | Peterborough United | Cambridge |
| 12:30 GMT | | | | Stadium: Cledara Abbey Stadium |
Note: Fixture was initially scheduled for a 15:00 kick-off, but was brought forward.

=== FA Cup ===
Cambridge were drawn away to Bristol Rovers in the first round.

Win Draw Loss Fixtures

| 6 November 2026 First round | Bristol Rovers | 2–0 | Cambridge United | Horfield |
| 19:30 GMT | Kilgour (yellow card) 40'; Russell-Denny 57'; Leigh (yellow card) 71'; Cavegn 72'; Purrington (yellow card) 74'; Mola (yellow card) 79' | Report | Bennett (yellow card) 51'; Kaikai (penalty missed) | Stadium: Memorial Stadium; Attendance: 3,657; Referee: Jamie O'Connor |

=== EFL Cup ===
The U's were drawn at home to Barnet in the first round and to Millwall in the second round.

Win Draw Loss Fixtures

| 8 August 2026 First round | Cambridge United | 2–1 | Barnet | Cambridge |
| 13:00 BST | Knight 52'; Heath 57'; Watts (yellow card) 86'; Eastwood (yellow card) 88' | | Tshimanga 49'; Kanu (yellow card) 86'; Williams (yellow card) 88' | Stadium: Cledara Abbey Stadium; Attendance: 3,521; Referee: Carl Brook |

| 25 August 2026 Second round | Cambridge United | 0–1 | Millwall | Cambridge |
| 19:45 BST | Bauer (yellow card) 50'; McConnell (yellow card) 87' | Report | Cooper 9' | Stadium: Cledara Abbey Stadium; Attendance: 5,363 (1,433 away fans); Referee: Paul Howard |

=== EFL Trophy ===
==== Group stage ====
Cambridge were drawn against Northampton Town, Gillingham and Brighton & Hove Albion U21 into Southern Group G.

| Pos | Div | Team | Pld | W | PW | PL | L | GF | GA | GD | Pts | Qualification |
|---|---|---|---|---|---|---|---|---|---|---|---|---|
| 1 | L1 | Cambridge United | 3 | 3 | 0 | 0 | 0 | 12 | 2 | +10 | 9 | Advance to Round 2 |
| 2 | L2 | Gillingham | 3 | 2 | 0 | 0 | 1 | 7 | 8 | −1 | 6 | Advance to Round 2 |
| 3 | ACA | Brighton & Hove Albion U21 | 3 | 1 | 0 | 0 | 2 | 6 | 10 | −4 | 3 | |
| 4 | L2 | Northampton Town | 3 | 0 | 0 | 0 | 3 | 2 | 7 | −5 | 0 | |

Source: EFL

Win Draw Loss Fixtures

| 22 September 2026 Group stage | Gillingham | 1–4 | Cambridge United | Gillingham |
| 19:00 BST | Dayal 31'; Daley (yellow card) 64' | Report | Bradshaw 24'; Mpanzu 34', (yellow card) 59'; Appéré 57'; Herd (yellow card) 78'; Heath 87' (pen.) | Stadium: MEMS Priestfield Stadium; Attendance: 911 (109 away); Referee: George Laflin |

| 6 October 2026 Group stage | Cambridge United | 2–1 | Northampton Town | Cambridge |
| 19:00 BST | Mpanzu 29'; Ahadme 62' (pen.); Watts (yellow card) 73' | Report | Warhurst 51'; Powell (yellow card) 72'; Evans (yellow card) 82' | Stadium: Cledara Abbey Stadium; Attendance: 888 (100 away); Referee: Aaron Farmer |

| 3 November 2026 Group stage | Cambridge United | 6–0 | Brighton & Hove Albion U21 | Cambridge |
| 19:00 GMT | Heath 40' (pen.); Bangura-Williams 43'; Efobi 50'; Stead 54', 68'; Ferdinand 50' (o.g.) | Report | Barclay (red card) 38'; Alakiu (yellow card) 57' | Stadium: Cledara Abbey Stadium; Attendance: 566; Referee: Craig Hicks |

== Statistics ==
=== Appearances and goals ===
As of match played 21 November 2026

Players with no appearances are not included on the list

| No. | Pos | Nat | Player | Total | | League One | | FA Cup | | EFL Cup | | EFL Trophy | |
| No. | Pos | Nat | Player | Apps | Goals | Apps | Goals | Apps | Goals | Apps | Goals | Apps | Goals |
|---|---|---|---|---|---|---|---|---|---|---|---|---|---|
| 1 | GK | (England) ENG | Jake Eastwood | 18 | 0 | 15+0 | 0 | 1+0 | 0 | 2+0 | 0 | 0+0 | 0 |
| 2 | DF | (England) ENG | Liam Bennett | 16 | 1 | 13+0 | 1 | 1+0 | 0 | 2+0 | 0 | 0+0 | 0 |
| 3 | DF | (England) ENG | Callum Perry | 14 | 0 | 10+0 | 0 | 0+1 | 0 | 1+1 | 0 | 1+0 | 0 |
| 4 | MF | (England) ENG | Dominic Ball | 15 | 0 | 11+0 | 0 | 0+0 | 0 | 2+0 | 0 | 0+2 | 0 |
| 5 | DF | (Germany) GER | Patrick Bauer | 7 | 0 | 0+3 | 0 | 1+0 | 0 | 1+0 | 0 | 2+0 | 0 |
| 6 | DF | (England) ENG | Kell Watts | 20 | 2 | 15+0 | 2 | 1+0 | 0 | 2+0 | 0 | 2+0 | 0 |
| 7 | FW | (England) ENG | Isaac Heath | 17 | 4 | 8+3 | 1 | 0+1 | 0 | 2+0 | 1 | 3+0 | 2 |
| 8 | MF | (England) ENG | Owen Moxon | 16 | 0 | 6+6 | 0 | 1+0 | 0 | 0+0 | 0 | 1+2 | 0 |
| 9 | FW | (Scotland) SCO | Louis Appéré | 19 | 2 | 7+7 | 1 | 1+0 | 0 | 1+1 | 0 | 1+1 | 1 |
| 10 | FW | (England) ENG | Ben Knight | 19 | 5 | 14+1 | 4 | 1+0 | 0 | 1+0 | 1 | 1+1 | 0 |
| 11 | FW | (Sierra Leone) SLE | Sullay Kaikai | 16 | 3 | 7+5 | 3 | 1+0 | 0 | 1+1 | 0 | 1+0 | 0 |
| 12 | FW | (England) ENG | Callum Stead | 4 | 2 | 1+1 | 0 | 0+1 | 0 | 0+0 | 0 | 1+0 | 2 |
| 13 | GK | (England) ENG | Gabriel Breeze | 3 | 0 | 0+0 | 0 | 0+0 | 0 | 0+0 | 0 | 3+0 | 0 |
| 14 | FW | (Morocco) MAR | Gassan Ahadme | 12 | 4 | 8+2 | 3 | 0+0 | 0 | 1+0 | 0 | 1+0 | 1 |
| 15 | DF | (Republic of Ireland) IRL | Cathal Heffernan | 17 | 0 | 13+0 | 0 | 0+1 | 0 | 0+0 | 0 | 3+0 | 0 |
| 17 | MF | (Democratic Republic of the Congo) COD | Pelly Ruddock Mpanzu | 20 | 2 | 11+4 | 0 | 1+0 | 0 | 1+1 | 0 | 2+0 | 2 |
| 19 | FW | (Northern Ireland) NIR | Shayne Lavery | 18 | 3 | 0+14 | 3 | 0+1 | 0 | 0+2 | 0 | 0+1 | 0 |
| 21 | MF | (Republic of Ireland) IRL | Shane McLoughlin | 6 | 0 | 3+1 | 0 | 0+0 | 0 | 1+0 | 0 | 1+0 | 0 |
| 22 | DF | (England) ENG | Zak Bradshaw | 21 | 3 | 11+4 | 2 | 1+0 | 0 | 1+1 | 0 | 2+1 | 1 |
| 27 | FW | (Republic of Ireland) IRL | Glenn McConnell | 6 | 0 | 1+1 | 0 | 0+0 | 0 | 2+0 | 0 | 1+1 | 0 |
| 29 | DF | (Republic of Ireland) IRL | Sam Curtis | 5 | 0 | 2+2 | 0 | 0+0 | 0 | 0+0 | 0 | 1+0 | 0 |
| 30 | MF | (England) ENG | Lohan McDougald | 3 | 0 | 0+0 | 0 | 0+0 | 0 | 0+1 | 0 | 0+2 | 0 |
| 32 | FW | (England) ENG | Daniel Efobi | 2 | 1 | 0+0 | 0 | 0+0 | 0 | 0+0 | 0 | 1+1 | 1 |
| 33 | MF | (England) ENG | Daniel Herd | 2 | 0 | 0+0 | 0 | 0+0 | 0 | 0+0 | 0 | 1+1 | 0 |
| 34 | MF | (Scotland) SCO | Daniel Fraser | 1 | 0 | 0+0 | 0 | 0+0 | 0 | 0+1 | 0 | 0+0 | 0 |
| 38 | MF | (England) ENG | George Hoddle | 8 | 0 | 4+2 | 0 | 0+0 | 0 | 0+0 | 0 | 2+0 | 0 |
| 41 | DF | (England) ENG | Jamie Murefu | 1 | 0 | 0+0 | 0 | 0+0 | 0 | 0+0 | 0 | 0+1 | 0 |
| 44 | MF | (England) ENG | Raees Bangura-Williams | 16 | 1 | 3+9 | 0 | 1+0 | 0 | 0+1 | 0 | 2+0 | 1 |
Player(s) who featured but departed the club permanently during the season:
| 23 | DF | (England) ENG | Mamadou Jobe | 3 | 0 | 2 | 0 | 0 | 0 | 1 | 0 | 0+0 | 0 |
