= George Hoddle =

English footballer (born 2005)

- Hoddle with Cambridge United in 2026

Personal information
- Full name: George David Hoddle
- Date of birth: 6 September 2005 (age 21)
- Place of birth: Harlow, Essex
- Height: 1.83 m (6 ft 0 in)
- Position: Midfielder

Team information
- Current team: Cambridge United
- Number: 38

Youth career
- 20??–2020: Bishop's Stortford
- 2020–2023: Cambridge United

Senior career*
Years	Team	Apps	(Gls)
2023–	Cambridge United	24	(0)
2022–2023	→ St Neots Town (loan)	5	(0)
2023	→ Royston Town (loan)	7	(0)
2023–2024	→ St Albans City (loan)	25	(4)
2025	→ Bedford Town (loan)	2	(0)
- * Club domestic league appearances and goals as of 08:22, 4 November 2026 (UTC)

George David Hoddle (born 06 September 2005) is an English professional footballer who plays as a midfielder for EFL League One club Cambridge United. He has played on loan at St Neots Town, Royston Town, St Albans City and Bedford Town.

== Early life ==
Hoddle grew up in and around Bishop’s Stortford and attended The Bishop's Stortford High School. He is a second cousin of former England manager Glenn Hoddle.

== Career ==
On 19 August 2022, Hoddle joined Northern Premier League Division One Midlands club St Neots Town on a work experience loan. On 11 February 2023, he was named on the substitute bench by Cambridge whilst ineligible due to being on loan at St. Neots following what CEO Alex Tunbridge described as "our own fault and oversight"; Cambridge were fined £12,000 by the FA. On 2 March 2023, he joined Southern League Premier Division Central club Royston Town on loan.

In July 2023, he signed his first professional contract, a three-year deal, after being named the Terry Baker Scholar of the Year and helping the youth team to reach the quarter-finals of the FA Youth Cup. On 5 August 2023, he joined St Albans City in the National League South on loan until the end of the season. He was recalled by newly appointed Cambridge manager Garry Monk on 6 March 2024, having scored four goals, made four assists and won one Player of the Month award at St Albans. On 16 April 2024, he made his league debut for Cambridge in a 1–0 away defeat to Bristol Rovers.

In September 2025, Hoddle joined National League North club Bedford Town on loan.

== Career statistics ==
As of match played 3 November 2026

Appearances and goals by club, season and competition
Club	Season	League			FA Cup		EFL Cup		Other		Total	
Club	Season	Division	Apps	Goals	Apps	Goals	Apps	Goals	Apps	Goals	Apps	Goals
Cambridge United	2022–23	League One	0	0	0	0	0	0	0	0	0	0
Cambridge United	2023–24	League One	1	0	0	0	0	0	0	0	1	0
Cambridge United	2024–25	League One	2	0	0	0	0	0	0	0	2	0
Cambridge United	2025–26	League Two	15	0	3	0	1	0	4	0	23	0
Cambridge United	2026–27	League One	6	0	0	0	0	0	2	0	8	0
Cambridge United	Total		24	0	3	0	1	0	6	0	34	0
St Neots Town (loan)	2022–23	Northern Premier League; Division One Midlands	5	0	2	1	0	0	0	0	7	1
Royston Town (loan)	2022–23	Southern League; Premier Division Central	7	0	0	0	0	0	0	0	7	0
St Albans City (loan)	2023–24	National League South	25	4	0	0	0	0	3 (Note: 1 appearance in the FA Trophy, 1 appearance in the Herts Charity Cup and 1 appearance in the Herts Senior Cup)	0	28	4
Bedford Town (loan)	2025–26	National League North	2	0	0	0	0	0	0	0	2	0
Career total			63	4	5	1	1	0	9	0	78	4
