= Ben Knight (footballer) =

English footballer (born 2002)

Personal information
- Full name: Benjamin Leo Knight
- Date of birth: 14 June 2002 (age 24)
- Place of birth: Cambridge, England
- Height: 1.70 m (5 ft 7 in)
- Position: Forward

Team information
- Current team: Cambridge United
- Number: 10

Youth career
- 2009–2010: Burwell Tigers
- 2010–2018: Ipswich Town
- 2018–2021: Manchester City

Senior career*
Years	Team	Apps	(Gls)
2021–2024	Manchester City	0	(0)
2021–2022	→ Crewe Alexandra (loan)	6	(0)
2024	→ Stockport County (loan)	0	(0)
2024–2025	Real Murcia	4	(0)
2025–	Cambridge United	50	(15)

International career^{‡}
2018–2019	England U17	11	(0)
2019	England U18	1	(0)
- * Club domestic league appearances and goals as of 08:29, 7 November 2026 (UTC) ‡ National team caps and goals as of 21:11, 11 June 2022 (UTC)

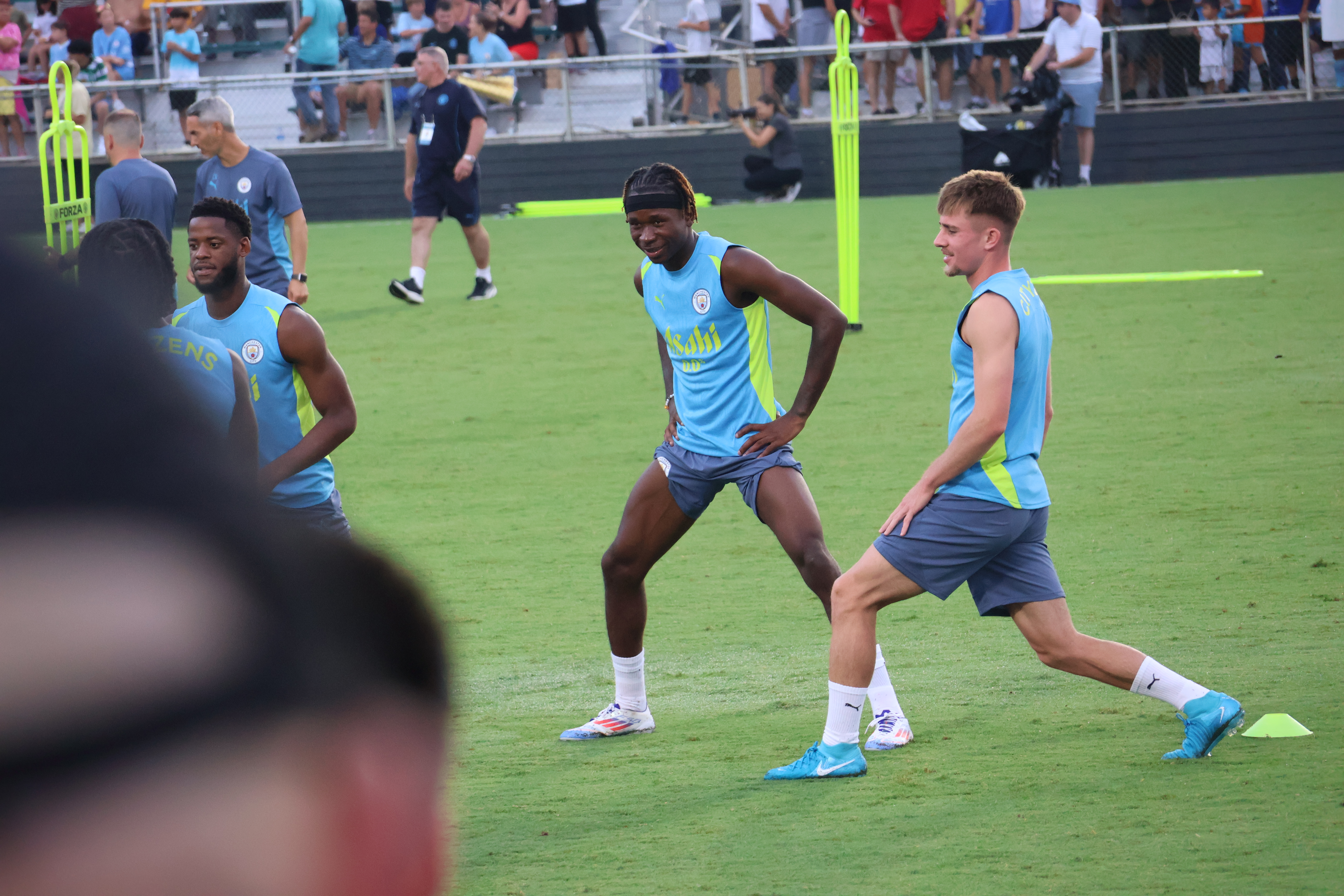
Knight (right) at Manchester City open practice for the FC Series in Cary, North Carolina, 2024

Benjamin Leo Knight (born 14 June 2002) is an English professional footballer who plays as a Forward for EFL League One club Cambridge United.

== Club career ==
=== Early career ===
Born in Cambridge, Knight started his career with local side Burwell Tigers, joining at under-7s level, before joining Ipswich Town. After eight years with Ipswich Town, Knight joined Premier League side Manchester City in July 2018.

=== Manchester City ===
Knight made his debut for Manchester City in the 2021 FA Community Shield at Wembley Stadium on the 7th August 2021, coming on as a substitute in the 74th minute for Ferran Torres during the 0–1 defeat to Leicester City.

==== Crewe Alexandra (loan) ====
On 16 August 2021, Knight joined Crewe Alexandra on a season-long loan, and made his Crewe debut the following day in a 1–0 defeat at Oxford United. He scored his first Crewe goal on his fifth appearance, the winner in a 1–0 victory at Shrewsbury Town in an EFL Trophy group tie on 31 August 2021, but then picked up an injury that ruled him out until 30 October 2021. He played five further games, scoring once, before being sidelined again with a foot injury.

==== Stockport County (loan) ====
On 12 March 2024, it was announced that Knight had moved to Stockport County on loan until the end of the season.The move had been agreed during the previous transfer window but had only been announced once the player had recovered from injury and completed his rehabilitation.

On 12 August 2024, Knight joined Primera Federación side Real Murcia on a permanent deal. On 3 February 2025, he left the club after just four substitute appearances.

=== Cambridge United ===
On 2 June 2025, Knight joined Cambridge United on a free transfer. He was named EFL League Two Player of the Month for January 2026 having scored five goals in five matches.

== Personal life ==
Knight is the nephew of former England international cricketer Nick Knight.

== Career statistics ==
As of match played 6 November 2026

Club	Season	League			National cup (Note: Includes FA Cup)		League cup (Note: Includes EFL Cup)		Other		Total	
Club	Season	Division	Apps	Goals	Apps	Goals	Apps	Goals	Apps	Goals	Apps	Goals
Manchester City U23	2018–19	—			—		—		1 (Note: Appearance(s) in EFL Trophy)	0	1	0
Manchester City U23	2019–20	—			—		—		4	0	4	0
Manchester City U23	2020–21	—			—		—		4	2	4	2
Manchester City U23	Total		—		—		—		9	2	9	2
Manchester City	2021–22	Premier League	—		—		—		1 (Note: Appearance in FA Community Shield)	0	1	0
Crewe Alexandra (loan)	2021–22	League One	6	0	—		1	0	3	2	10	2
Real Murcia	2024–25	Primera Federación	4	0	—		—		—		4	0
Cambridge United	2025–26	League Two	36	11	3	0	3	0	4	0	46	11
Cambridge United	2026–27	League One	14	4	1	0	1	1	2	0	18	5
Cambridge United	Total		50	15	4	0	4	1	6	0	64	16
Career total			60	15	4	0	5	1	19	4	88	20

== Honors ==
Stockport County

- EFL League Two: 2023–24

Individual

- EFL League Two Player of the Month: January 2026
