= Jake Eastwood =

English footballer (born 1996)

Personal information
- Full name: Jake Eastwood
- Date of birth: 3 October 1996 (age 30)
- Place of birth: Sheffield, England
- Position: Goalkeeper

Team information
- Current team: Cambridge United
- Number: 1

Youth career
- Sheffield United

Senior career*
Years	Team	Apps	(Gls)
2016–2023	Sheffield United	1	(0)
2014–2015	→ Sheffield (loan)	35	(0)
2016	→ Gainsborough Trinity (loan)	3	(0)
2016–2017	→ Mickleover Sports (loan)	30	(0)
2017–2018	→ Chesterfield (loan)	4	(0)
2019–2020	→ Scunthorpe United (loan)	11	(0)
2020	→ Kilmarnock (loan)	1	(0)
2021	→ Grimsby Town (loan)	7	(0)
2021	→ Portsmouth (loan)	0	(0)
2022	→ Rochdale (loan)	2	(0)
2022–2023	→ Ross County (loan)	0	(0)
2023	→ Rochdale (loan)	6	(0)
2023–2025	Grimsby Town	28	(0)
2025–	Cambridge United	59	(0)
- * Club domestic league appearances and goals as of 08:23, 7 November 2026 (UTC)

Jake Eastwood (born 3 October 1996) is an English footballer who plays as a goalkeeper for EFL League One club Cambridge United.

Having come through the Sheffield United academy, he signed professional terms and made three first team appearances over a seven year period. He spent time on loan with Sheffield, Gainsborough Trinity, Mickleover Sports, Chesterfield, Scunthorpe United, Kilmarnock, Grimsby Town, Portsmouth and Rochdale. He joined Grimsby permanently ahead of the 2023–24 season.

== Career ==
=== Sheffield United ===
Born in Sheffield, South Yorkshire, Eastwood joined Sheffield United's youth academy at the age of 10. In his youth, he has spent time on loan with Sheffield, Gainsborough Trinity and Mickleover Sports for first team experience.

In April 2016, Eastwood was one of four youth players to sign professional terms with Sheffield United. He started the 2017–18 season as deputy to loanee Jamal Blackman, who himself was signed to cover for injured first team keeper Simon Moore. On 9 August 2017, Eastwood made his senior first-team debut in the Football League Cup in a 3–2 home victory over Walsall at Bramall Lane. He started again in the Blades' next tie in the League Cup which ended in a 4–1 home defeat to the visitors Leicester City of the Premier League, which knocked the Blades out of the competition.

In November 2017, Eastwood signed a new long-term contract, committing to the Blades until 2020. He then joined Chesterfield on an emergency loan. Eastwood made his league debut for Sheffield United on 3 February 2018 against Wolverhampton Wanderers, replacing Simon Moore who was sent off in the 73rd minute.

On 5 July 2019, Eastwood joined Scunthorpe United on a season-long loan deal. After injuries to Sheffield United goalkeepers Simon Moore and Michael Verrips, he was recalled by his parent club in January 2020. As a result, he was on the bench for their Premier League game against West Ham United.

On 30 July 2020, Eastwood signed for Scottish Premiership club Kilmarnock on a six-month loan. He made his debut on 1 August 2020, in Kilmarnock's opening game of the season, away to Hibernian, however he had to be substituted at half-time due to injury. On 11 January 2021, he returned to Sheffield United after making two appearances in all competitions.

On 1 February 2021, Eastwood joined League Two side Grimsby Town on loan for the remainder of the 2020–21 season. Eastwood temporarily took over as first choice keeper having been favoured to regular James McKeown but an injury suffered in March limited him to 7 appearances.

On 7 September 2021, Eastwood signed for League One side Portsmouth on a seven-day emergency loan in order to play in an EFL Trophy tie against AFC Wimbledon. Portsmouth's first choice keeper Gavin Bazunu was on international duty with the Republic of Ireland, whilst his understudy Alex Bass was isolating due to COVID-19, Portsmouth lost the game 5–3.

Eastwood returned to Scotland by joining Scottish Premiership side Ross County on loan for the 2022-23 season. In January, Eastwood returned to Rochdale on loan until the end of the season having failed to make a league appearance in Scotland.

=== Grimsby Town ===
On 4 July 2023, Eastwood returned to Grimsby Town signing a two-year contract for an undisclosed fee. Although signed as first choice goalkeeper, Eastwood found himself playing deputy to young loanee Harvey Cartwright for most of the season.

On 13 August 2024, in his first EFL Cup appearance for Grimsby Town, Eastwood saved twice and scored in a penalty shoot out, as they defeated Bradford City 1–1 (9–8 on penalties) in the first round of the tournament. In September 2024, Eastwood ruptured his patellar tendon after colliding with a goal post in a 3–2 victory over Carlisle United. Following surgery, he was ruled out for a period of six months. Eastwood served as the number 2 keeper for most of the season under Jordan Wright, however eventually he would take his place in the final several months of the season

On 7 May 2025, Grimsby announced the player would leave in June when his contract expired.

=== Cambridge United ===
Following his release from Grimsby, Eastwood signed a one-year deal with Cambridge United.

== Career statistics ==
As of match played 6 November 2026

Club	Season	League			Cup		League Cup		Other		Total	
Club	Season	Division	Apps	Goals	Apps	Goals	Apps	Goals	Apps	Goals	Apps	Goals
Sheffield United	2016–17	League One	0	0	0	0	0	0	0	0	0	0
Sheffield United	2017–18	Championship	1	0	0	0	2	0	0	0	3	0
Sheffield United	2018–19	Championship	0	0	0	0	0	0	0	0	0	0
Sheffield United	2019–20	Premier League	0	0	0	0	0	0	0	0	0	0
Sheffield United	2020–21	Premier League	0	0	0	0	0	0	0	0	0	0
Sheffield United	Total		1	0	0	0	2	0	0	0	3	0
Gainsborough Trinity (loan)	2016–17	National League North	3	0	0	0	0	0	0	0	3	0
Chesterfield (loan)	2017–18	League Two	4	0	0	0	0	0	0	0	4	0
Scunthorpe United (loan)	2019–20	League Two	11	0	1	0	0	0	4 (Note: Appearance(s) in EFL Trophy)	0	16	0
Kilmarnock (loan)	2020–21	Scottish Premiership	1	0	0	0	1	0	0	0	2	0
Grimsby Town (loan)	2020–21	League Two	7	0	0	0	0	0	0	0	7	0
Portsmouth (loan)	2021–22	League One	0	0	0	0	0	0	1	0	1	0
Rochdale (loan)	2021–22	League Two	2	0	0	0	0	0	0	0	2	0
Ross County (loan)	2022–23	Scottish Premiership	0	0	0	0	2	0	0	0	2	0
Grimsby Town	2023–24	League Two	22	0	0	0	0	0	0	0	22	0
Grimsby Town	2024–25	League Two	6	0	0	0	2	0	0	0	8	0
Grimsby Town	Total		28	0	0	0	2	0	0	0	30	0
Cambridge United	2025–26	League Two	45	0	3	0	3	0	0	0	51	0
Cambridge United	2026–27	League One	14	0	1	0	2	0	0	0	17	0
Cambridge United	Total		59	0	4	0	5	0	0	0	68	0
Career total			116	0	5	0	12	0	5	0	138	0
