= Glenn McConnell (footballer) =

Irish footballer (born 2005)

Personal information
- Full name: Felipe Glenn Nascimento McConnell
- Date of birth: 26 April 2005 (age 21)
- Place of birth: Salvador, Brazil
- Height: 1.73 m (5 ft 8 in)
- Position: Forward

Team information
- Current team: Cambridge United
- Number: 27

Youth career
- –2022: Cambridge United

Senior career*
Years	Team	Apps	(Gls)
2022–	Cambridge United	11	(0)
2022	→ St Neots Town (loan)	10	(3)
2022–2023	→ St Albans City (loan)	17	(5)
2024–2025	→ Chelmsford City (loan)	6	(0)

International career^{‡}
2022	Republic of Ireland U18	1	(0)
- * Club domestic league appearances and goals as of 08:27, 4 November 2026 (UTC) ‡ National team caps and goals as of 23 May 2024

Felipe Glenn Nascimento McConnell (born 26 April 2005) is an Irish professional footballer playing as a forward for EFL League One club Cambridge United.

== Career ==
Having joined the Cambridge United academy at under-9's level, McConnell progressed through the ranks, signing a first professional contract in May 2022 having finished the previous season on a youth-loan with St Neots Town.

On 30 December 2022, McConnell joined National League South club St Albans City on an initial one-month loan, later extended until the end of the season.

On 26 August 2023, McConnell made his senior debut for Cambridge United, replacing Jack Lankester in a 2–0 defeat to Leyton Orient. In December 2023, he suffered an ankle ligament injury that ultimately ruled him out for the remainder of the season. Following the conclusion of the 2023–24 season, McConnell signed a new three-year contract.

On 23 November 2024, McConnell signed for Chelmsford City on loan.

== International career ==
In November 2022, McConnell was called up to the Republic of Ireland under-18 squad.

== Career statistics ==
=== Club ===
As of match played 3 November 2026.

Appearances and goals by club, season and competition
Club	Season	League			FA Cup		EFL Cup		Other		Total	
Club	Season	Division	Apps	Goals	Apps	Goals	Apps	Goals	Apps	Goals	Apps	Goals
St Neots Town (loan)	2021–22	Southern Football League Division One Central	10	3	0	0	—		0	0	10	3
St Albans City (loan)	2022–23	National League South	17	5	0	0	—		3 (Note: Appearance in National League South play-offs)	0	20	5
Cambridge United	2023–24	League One	3	0	1	0	0	0	3 (Note: Appearance(s) in EFL Trophy)	0	7	0
Cambridge United	2024–25	League One	0	0	0	0	0	0	1	0	1	0
Cambridge United	2025–26	League Two	6	0	2	0	1	0	4	1	13	1
Cambridge United	2026–27	League One	2	0	0	0	2	0	2	0	6	0
Cambridge United	Total		11	0	2	0	3	0	10	1	26	1
Chelmsford City (loan)	2024–25	National League South	3	0	0	0	0	0	0	0	3	0
Career total			41	8	3	0	3	0	13	1	60	9
