= Sullay Kaikai =

Sierra Leonean footballer (born 1995)

Personal information
- Full name: Sulaiman Borbor Kaikai
- Date of birth: 26 August 1995 (age 31)
- Place of birth: Southwark, London, England
- Height: 6 ft 0 in (1.82 m)
- Position: Winger

Team information
- Current team: Cambridge United
- Number: 11

Youth career
- 2010–2013: Crystal Palace

Senior career*
Years	Team	Apps	(Gls)
2013–2019	Crystal Palace	3	(0)
2014	→ Crawley Town (loan)	5	(0)
2014–2015	→ Cambridge United (loan)	25	(5)
2015	→ Shrewsbury Town (loan)	14	(5)
2016	→ Shrewsbury Town (loan)	12	(7)
2016–2017	→ Brentford (loan)	18	(3)
2018	→ Charlton Athletic (loan)	14	(0)
2019	NAC Breda	6	(0)
2019–2021	Blackpool	58	(11)
2021–2023	Wycombe Wanderers	24	(2)
2023	Milton Keynes Dons	14	(2)
2023–	Cambridge United	119	(19)

International career^{‡}
2021–	Sierra Leone	21	(1)
- * Club domestic league appearances and goals as of 08:29, 7 November 2026 (UTC) ‡ National team caps and goals as of 11:16, 28 September 2024 (UTC)

Sulaiman Borbor "Sullay" Kaikai (born 26 August 1995) is a professional footballer who plays as a winger for EFL League One club Cambridge United. Born in England, he plays for the Sierra Leone national team.

A youth product of Crystal Palace, he made his senior debut on loan at Crawley Town in 2014, and later that year scored on his Palace debut. He was loaned to Cambridge United, Shrewsbury Town, Brentford and Charlton Athletic. After eleven total appearances for Palace, he was signed by NAC Breda in January 2019 and moved to Blackpool that July.

== Club career ==
=== Crystal Palace ===
==== Youth ====
Kaikai started his career at Crystal Palace when he was fifteen. In May 2013, his goal against Liverpool the previous August won the League Football Education Goal of the Season award.

==== 2013–14: Crawley (loan) ====
On 7 February 2014, Kaikai joined League One side Crawley Town on an initial one-month loan along with Hiram Boateng. He made his senior debut on 25 February when he came on as a substitute for Andy Drury in the 33rd minute of a 1–1 draw at Swindon Town. On 7 March, he extended his loan with Crawley until 5 April. After making five appearances for the club, two being starts, Kaikai returned to his parent club upon expiry of his loan spell.

==== 2014–15: Debut and Cambridge (loan) ====
On 24 September 2014, Kaikai made his Crystal Palace debut in the third round of the League Cup, replacing Jonathan Williams in the 80th minute of the match against Newcastle United at Selhurst Park. He equalised in added time to send the game into extra time, which the Eagles lost 2–3.

On 27 November 2014, Kaikai joined League Two club Cambridge United, on loan until 3 January 2015. Two days later, Kaikai made his debut for the club, assisting Liam Hughes in a 2–1 win over AFC Wimbledon at the Kingsmeadow Stadium. Kaikai scored his first goal of his loan on 16 December in the FA Cup second round replay, the only goal of a win at Mansfield Town. He signed his first professional contract with Palace on 29 December 2014.

On 16 January 2015, Kaikai's loan at Cambridge was extended until the end of the season. The next day, he scored his first league goal, in a 4–0 win over Newport County at the Abbey Stadium. Kaikai scored a brace on 18 April, in a 3–1 home win over Mansfield. He returned to Palace in the first week of May. He won Palace's Vice-President's Young Player or the Year Award, and the Development Player of the Year Award on 13 May. Ahead of the Premier League match against Liverpool three days later, Kaikai was among several youngsters to make a trip, but was not included either in the starting line-up or substitution bench.

==== 2015–16: League debut and Shrewsbury (loan) ====
The following season, on 17 September 2015, Kaikai joined League One side Shrewsbury Town on a four-month loan deal. He made his debut as a 67th-minute substitute for Mat Sadler in a 1–0 home defeat to Crewe Alexandra two days later, and got his first goals for the club in a home victory against Colchester United on 10 October, scoring twice to put his team 3–2 and then eventually 4–2 ahead after they had trailed by two goals at half time. After scoring in subsequent matches against Scunthorpe United and Bury, giving him four goals in five appearances, he won the PFA Fans Player of the Month award for October 2015 for League One.

Kaikai was recalled to cover for injuries at his parent club on 23 December, rejoining Shrewsbury for a further loan deal until the end of the season in March 2016. He scored four times in the first four games of his second loan, including two first-half strikes in a 2–1 draw at Bury on 19 March which earned him a place in The Football League's Team of the Week. He finished the season as Shrewsbury's top scorer, with 12 goals, before being recalled again by his parent club on 3 May.

Kaikai made his Premier League debut on 15 May in the last game of the season, replacing Jordon Mutch at half time in a 4–1 loss at Southampton. He took the corner kick from which Jason Puncheon scored the Eagles' goal. He was handed the number 25 shirt to wear for the 2016–17 season, switching from his previous squad number 43.

==== 2016–17: Brentford (loan) ====
On deadline day, 31 August 2016, Kaikai joined Brentford on a season-long loan and was given the number 25 shirt. He made his debut against Palace's fierce rivals Brighton & Hove Albion replacing Lewis Macleod in the 80th minute of a 2–0 away victory on 10 September. Four days later he provided an 88th-minute assist for John Egan as Brentford drew 1–1 with Aston Villa. Kaikai scored his first goal for the Bees in a 3–1 loss at Wolverhampton Wanderers on 24 September. He scored both of Brentford's goals a 2–2 draw with Cardiff City on Boxing Day, after coming on as a second-half substitute, before being recalled by Crystal Palace on 2 January 2017.

==== 2017–18: Charlton (loan) ====
On 26 January 2018, following four appearances for Palace in the first half of the season, Kaikai moved across South London to join Charlton Athletic on loan until the end of the season. He made his league debut for them on 3 February in a 3–2 loss against Oxford United as a 69th-minute substitute for Stephy Mavididi.

=== NAC Breda ===
On 21 January 2019, Kaikai joined Dutch club NAC Breda on a permanent transfer. He made his Eredivisie debut four days later, as a 65th-minute substitute for Giovanni Korte in a 1–1 home draw with ADO Den Haag. He made six appearances in the Netherlands, all but one from the bench.

=== Blackpool ===
In July 2019, Kaikai terminated his contract with Breda and signed for League One side Blackpool on an initial two-year contract with an option of a further year. He was given a starting debut in their 2–0 victory over Bristol Rovers at Bloomfield Road on 3 August, and his first goal in a 2–2 draw away at Gillingham 17 days later. It was his first goal since 26 December 2016, when he scored both of Brentford's goals in a home draw with Cardiff City in the Championship.

=== Wycombe Wanderers ===
On 15 July 2021, Kaikai joined League One side Wycombe Wanderers on a free transfer, signing a two-year deal.

=== Milton Keynes Dons ===
On 26 January 2023, Kaikai joined Milton Keynes Dons on a free transfer until the end of the season. After making 14 appearances and scoring 2 goals, and despite the offer of a new contract, Kaikai was one of nine players released by Milton Keynes Dons following their relegation to EFL League Two.

=== Cambridge United ===
On 24 July 2023, Kaikai returned to League One, joining Cambridge United on a one-year deal. On 28 June 2024, Kaikai signed a new one-year contract. On 10 June 2025, the club announced he had signed a new two-year contract.

== International career ==
On 15 June 2021, Kaikai made his debut for Sierra Leone in a 1–0 victory over Benin in a 2021 Africa Cup of Nations qualification match. In December 2021, he was named in the Sierra Leone squad for the upcoming 2021 Africa Cup of Nations as the nation prepared for their first appearance at the competition since 1996.

== Personal life ==
Kaikai was born in the London Borough of Southwark to parents hailing from Sierra Leone.

== Career statistics ==
As of match played 6 November 2026

Appearances and goals by club, season and competition
Club	Season	League			FA Cup		League Cup		Other		Total	
Club	Season	Division	Apps	Goals	Apps	Goals	Apps	Goals	Apps	Goals	Apps	Goals
Crystal Palace	2013–14	Premier League	0	0	0	0	0	0	—		0	0
Crystal Palace	2014–15	Premier League	0	0	—		1	1	—		1	1
Crystal Palace	2015–16	Premier League	1	0	—		0	0	—		1	0
Crystal Palace	2016–17	Premier League	1	0	2	0	—		—		3	0
Crystal Palace	2017–18	Premier League	1	0	1	0	2	0	—		4	0
Crystal Palace	2018–19	Premier League	0	0	0	0	2	0	—		2	0
Crystal Palace	Total		3	0	3	0	5	1	0	0	11	1
Crawley Town (loan)	2013–14	League One	5	0	—		—		—		5	0
Cambridge United (loan)	2014–15	League Two	25	5	5	1	—		—		30	6
Shrewsbury Town (loan)	2015–16	League One	26	12	2	0	—		1 (Note: One appearance in Football League Trophy)	0	29	12
Brentford (loan)	2016–17	Championship	18	3	—		—		—		18	3
Charlton Athletic (loan)	2017–18	League One	14	0	—		—		1 (Note: One appearance in the League One play-offs)	0	15	0
NAC Breda	2018–19	Eredivisie	6	0	0	0	0	0	0	0	6	0
Blackpool	2019–20	League One	22	4	2	1	1	0	3 (Note: Three appearances in EFL Trophy)	1	28	6
Blackpool	2020–21	League One	36	7	3	0	1	0	0	0	40	7
Blackpool	Total		58	11	5	1	2	0	3	1	68	13
Wycombe Wanderers	2021–22	League One	17	2	1	0	3	0	1 (Note: Appearances in EFL Trophy)	0	22	2
Wycombe Wanderers	2022–23	League One	7	0	1	0	0	0	2	0	10	0
Wycombe Wanderers	Total		24	2	2	0	3	0	3	0	32	2
Milton Keynes Dons	2022–23	League One	14	2	—		—		—		14	2
Cambridge United	2023–24	League One	39	3	3	1	0	0	1	0	43	4
Cambridge United	2024–25	League One	25	4	2	0	1	0	1	0	29	4
Cambridge United	2025–26	League Two	43	9	3	2	3	0	3	1	52	12
Cambridge United	2026–27	League One	12	3	1	0	2	0	1	0	16	3
Cambridge United	Total		119	19	9	3	6	0	6	1	140	23
Career total			311	54	26	5	16	1	14	3	367	62

=== International goals ===
Scores and results list Sierra Leone's goal tally first.

No.	Date	Venue	Opponent	Score	Result	Competition
1.	6 October 2021	Stade El Abdi, El Jadida, Morocco	South Sudan	1–0	1–1	Friendly
