= Kelland Watts =

English association football player

- Watts with Cambridge United in 2026

Personal information
- Full name: Kelland John William James Watts
- Date of birth: 3 November 1999 (age 27)
- Place of birth: Alnwick, England
- Height: 6 ft 4 in (1.92 m)
- Position: Centre-back

Team information
- Current team: Cambridge United
- Number: 6

Youth career
- 2008–2018: Newcastle United

Senior career*
Years	Team	Apps	(Gls)
2018–2024	Newcastle United	1	(0)
2019–2020	→ Stevenage (loan)	16	(0)
2020	→ Mansfield Town (loan)	7	(1)
2020–2021	→ Plymouth Argyle (loan)	44	(2)
2021–2022	→ Wigan Athletic (loan)	26	(0)
2022–2023	→ Peterborough United (loan)	7	(0)
2023–2024	→ Wigan Athletic (loan)	14	(0)
2024–	Cambridge United	89	(8)

International career
2018	England U19	2	(0)
- * Club domestic league appearances and goals as of 08:25, 7 November 2026 (UTC)

Kelland John William James Watts (born 3 November 1999) is an English professional footballer who plays as a centre-back for EFL League One side Cambridge United.

A product of the Newcastle United academy, Watts signed his first professional contract with the club in the summer of 2018. He joined League Two club Stevenage on loan in August 2019 and then spent two months on loan at fellow League Two club Mansfield Town from January 2020. Watts made his first-team debut for Newcastle in the Premier League in July 2020, before being loaned out to Plymouth Argyle for the 2020–21 season. He joined Wigan Athletic on a season-long loan in August 2021.

== Early life ==
Born in Alnwick, Northumberland, Watts grew up in Seahouses. He has three siblings. When he signed for Newcastle United's academy at the age of eight, the family relocated to Newcastle. He attended Ponteland High School.

== Club career ==
=== Newcastle United ===
Watts began playing football for Cramlington Juniors before joining Newcastle United's academy in 2008. He progressed through the youth academy at Newcastle, signing his first professional contract with the club in the summer of 2018. Having played in all 41 matches for Newcastle's under-23 team during the 2018–19 season, scoring six times, Watts appeared on the substitutes' bench in Newcastle's final Premier League game of the season, a 4–0 away victory at Fulham on 12 May 2019, although was an unused substitute in the match.

==== Loans to Stevenage and Mansfield Town ====
Having been included in Newcastle's 2019 Premier League Asia Trophy squad ahead of the 2019–20 season, Watts joined League Two club Stevenage on a season-long loan agreement on 16 August 2019. He made his professional debut the following day, playing the whole match in a 0–0 draw away at Leyton Orient. He made 20 appearances for Stevenage during the first half of the season, before Newcastle recalled him from the loan spell earlier than agreed on 10 January 2020. Watts subsequently joined League Two club Mansfield Town on 28 January 2020, on loan for the remainder of the 2019–20 season. He made seven appearances during the loan spell, scoring his first goal in professional football in the club's 2–1 away defeat to Leyton Orient on 11 February 2020.

==== Return to Newcastle United ====
The League Two regular season was curtailed due to the COVID-19 pandemic and Watts returned to Newcastle upon the conclusion of his loan contract at Mansfield. Newcastle applied to the Premier League for permission for Watts to be eligible to play in their remaining matches for the 2019–20 season, with Watts having already played for two different teams that season. The application was successful and Watts made his first-team debut for Newcastle in the club's 3–1 defeat to Liverpool at St James' Park on 26 July 2020, coming on as a 74th-minute substitute in the match.

==== Further loan spells ====
Watts joined League One club Plymouth Argyle on loan for the 2020–21 season on 24 August 2020. He debuted for Plymouth in a 3–2 home victory against Queens Park Rangers in the EFL Cup on 5 September 2020. Watts scored his first goal for Plymouth in an away defeat to Leyton Orient on 15 September 2020. He was stretchered off after a collision with Gillingham striker Vadaine Oliver on 9 May 2021; he received 12 minutes of treatment on the pitch before being taken to hospital where he was assessed and discharged later that night. Watts made 50 appearances for Plymouth during the season-long loan, scoring three goals.

Watts signed for Wigan Athletic of League One on loan for the 2021–22 season on 9 August 2021. He made his Wigan debut a day after joining the club, playing the first 74 minutes in the club's 1–1 draw, and subsequent 8–7 penalty shootout victory, against Hull City in the EFL Cup.

On 1 September 2022 Watts joined Peterborough United on loan until January 2023. However, he had to wait until he recovered from a knee injury before making his debut in October. At the end of January 2023, the loan deal was extended until the end of the season. However, just days after extending his loan spell, Watts picked up a hamstring injury, which could hold him out for the remainder of the season. At the end of the season, Watts returned to Newcastle.

On 29 May 2024, Newcastle announced the player would be released in the summer when his contract expired.

=== Cambridge United ===
On 12 June 2024, Watts signed a two-year deal with League One side Cambridge United.

On 8 January 2026, Watts extended his contract for an extra year until June 2027. He was named in the League Two Team of the Season for the 2025–26 season.

== International career ==
Watts was called up to the England under-19 team for the 2018 UEFA European under-19 Championship. He made his England under-19 debut in a 3–2 victory against Turkey under-19s on 17 July 2018, playing the whole match. He played twice during the tournament as England under-19s finished third in their group.

== Style of play ==
Watts began his career playing as a midfielder, before later being deployed in defence. He is left-footed and plays primarily as a left-sided central defender. Watts has been described as having "a strong eye for goal", emphasised by scoring two hat-tricks during the 2017–18 season when he briefly played as a striker, as well as being praised for being "quick, focused and strong in the air".

== Personal life ==
On 13 November 2025 it was revealed that Watts picks up milk on his way home from work from Bar Hill Tesco.

== Career statistics ==
As of match played 6 November 2026

Club	Season	League			FA Cup		EFL Cup		Other		Total	
Club	Season	Division	Apps	Goals	Apps	Goals	Apps	Goals	Apps	Goals	Apps	Goals
Newcastle United U23	2018–19	—			—		—		5 (Note: Appearance(s) in EFL Trophy)	0	5	0
Newcastle United	2018–19	Premier League	0	0	0	0	0	0	0	0	0	0
Newcastle United	2019–20	Premier League	1	0	0	0	0	0	0	0	1	0
Newcastle United	2020–21	Premier League	0	0	0	0	0	0	0	0	0	0
Newcastle United	2021–22	Premier League	0	0	0	0	0	0	0	0	0	0
Newcastle United	2022–23	Premier League	0	0	0	0	0	0	0	0	0	0
Newcastle United	Total		1	0	0	0	0	0	0	0	1	0
Stevenage (loan)	2019–20	League Two	16	0	1	0	0	0	3	0	20	0
Mansfield Town (loan)	2019–20	League Two	7	1	0	0	0	0	0	0	7	1
Plymouth Argyle (loan)	2020–21	League One	44	2	4	0	2	1	0	0	50	3
Wigan Athletic (loan)	2021–22	League One	26	0	5	0	2	0	2	0	35	0
Peterborough United (loan)	2022–23	League One	7	0	2	0	0	0	2	0	11	0
Wigan Athletic (loan)	2023–24	League One	14	0	0	0	1	0	4	0	19	0
Cambridge United	2024–25	League One	29	0	2	0	0	0	2	0	33	0
Cambridge United	2025–26	League Two	46	6	2	0	2	0	2	1	52	7
Cambridge United	2026–27	League One	14	2	1	0	2	0	2	0	19	2
Cambridge United	Total		89	8	5	0	4	0	6	1	104	9
Career total			203	11	17	0	9	0	22	1	251	13

== Honours ==
Wigan Athletic

- EFL League One: 2021–22

Individual

- EFL League Two Team of the Season: 2025–26
- PFA Team of the Year: 2025–26 League Two
