= 2025–26 Cambridge United F.C. season =

Cambridge United
2025–26 season
- Owner: Paul Barry (75.01%), Mark Green (24.99%)
- Chairman: Shaun Grady
- Head Coach: Neil Harris
- Stadium: Abbey Stadium
- League Two: 3rd (promoted)
- FA Cup: Third round (eliminated by Birmingham City)
- EFL Cup: Third round (eliminated by Fulham)
- EFL Trophy: Second round (eliminated by Bristol Rovers)
- Top goalscorer: League: Ben Knight (11); All: Sullay Kaikai (12)
- Highest home attendance: 7,983 (vs Notts County, 11 April 2026, EFL League Two)
- Lowest home attendance: 1,767 (vs Luton Town, 7 October 2025, EFL Trophy)
- Average home league attendance: 6,599
- Biggest win: 5–0 vs Gillingham (H) (14 March 2026); EFL League Two
Home colours	Away colours	Third colours

The 2025–26 season was the 114th season in the history of Cambridge United Football Club, and their first season back in League Two since the 2020–21 season following relegation from League One in the preceding season. In addition to the domestic league, the club also participated in the FA Cup, the EFL Cup and the EFL Trophy.

== Transfers and contracts ==
=== In ===
Date	Pos.	Player	From	Fee	Ref.
23 June 2025 (Note: The transfer was announced on 2 June, and would become official on June 23 when the squad returns for pre-season)	RW	(England) Ben Knight	Free agent	—N/a	
1 July 2025 (Note: The transfer was announced on 23 June, and would become official on July 1 when his contract at Leyton Orient had expired)	DM	(England) Dominic Ball	(England) Leyton Orient	Bosman	
1 July 2025 (Note: The transfer was announced on 26 June, and would become official on July 1 when his contract at Lincoln City had expired)	CB	(England) Zak Bradshaw	(England) Lincoln City	Bosman	
1 July 2025 (Note: The transfer was announced on 20 June, and would become official on July 1 when his contract at Swansea City had expired)	GK	(Wales) Ben Hughes	(Wales) Swansea City	Bosman	
1 July 2025 (Note: The transfer was announced on 23 June, and would become official on July 1 when his contract at Exeter City had expired)	LB	(England) Ben Purrington	(England) Exeter City	Bosman	
10 July 2025	GK	(England) Jake Eastwood	(England) Grimsby Town	Bosman	
24 July 2025	DM	(Democratic Republic of the Congo) Pelly Ruddock Mpanzu	(England) Luton Town	Bosman	
28 July 2025	RB	(Republic of Ireland) Shane McLoughlin	(Wales) Newport County	Bosman	
29 July 2025	CF	(Scotland) Louis Appéré	(England) Stevenage	Undisclosed	

=== Out ===
Date	Pos.	Player	To	Fee	Ref.

=== Loaned in ===
Date	Pos.	Player	From	Date until	Ref.
18 August 2025	CF	(England) Kylian Kouassi	(England) Blackpool	31 May 2026	
1 September 2025	LW	(England) Adam Mayor	(England) Millwall	31 May 2026	
23 January 2026	CF	(England) Elliott Nevitt	(England) Gillingham	31 May 2026	
2 February 2026	CB	(England) Sean Raggett	(England) Rotherham United	31 May 2026	
15 April 2026	GK	(England) Jack Walton	(England) Preston North End	22 April 2026	

=== Loaned out ===
Date	Pos.	Player	To	Date until	Ref.
1 September 2025	CF	(England) Ryan Loft	(England) Crawley Town	End of season	
5 September 2025	CB	(England) Harry Dawson	(England) Peterborough Sports		
5 September 2025	CF	(England) George Munday	(England) St Ives Town		
12 September 2025	GK	(England) JJ Briggs	(England) Downham Town		
12 September 2025	CM	(England) George Hoddle	(England) Bedford Town		
23 September 2025	CM	(England) Jahrel McKoy	(England) St Ives Town		
14 November 2025	LB	(England) Jamie Murefu	(England) Cheshunt	13 December 2025	
21 November 2025	CF	(England) Daniel Efobi	(England) St Ives Town	Work Experience	
12 December 2025	CF	(England) Ryan Gray	(England) Wroxham		
12 January 2026	CF	(England) George Munday	(England) Bedford Town	7 February 2026	
14 February 2026	GK	(England) JJ Briggs	(England) Chichester City		
14 February 2026	CF	(England) George Munday	(England) Hereford	31 May 2026	
22 February 2026	CB	(England) Zeno Ibsen Rossi	(Republic of Ireland) Shelbourne	30 June 2026	
21 March 2026	CF	(England) Daniel Efobi	(England) Real Bedford	31 May 2026	

=== Released / Out of Contract ===
Date	Pos.	Player	Subsequent club	Join date	Ref.
30 June 2025	GK	(England) Louis Chadwick	(England) King's Lynn Town	1 July 2025	
30 June 2025	DM	(England) Paul Digby	(Scotland) Dundee	1 July 2025	
30 June 2025	GK	(Slovakia) Marko Maroši	(England) Port Vale	1 July 2025	
30 June 2025	GK	(England) Jack Stevens	(England) Reading	1 July 2025	
30 June 2025	CM	(Jamaica) Jordan Cousins	(England) Eastleigh	15 July 2025	
30 June 2025	CF	(England) Brandon Njoku	(England) Sutton United	29 July 2025	
30 June 2025	LB	(England) Danny Andrew	(England) Stockport County	2 August 2025	
30 June 2025	LB	(England) Scott Malone	(England) Crawley Town	29 August 2025	
30 June 2025	CB	(Malawi) Jubril Okedina	(Republic of Ireland) Bohemian	31 August 2025	
30 June 2025	CAM	(Wales) George Thomas	(England) Morecambe	11 September 2025	
30 June 2025	CM	(England) Ben Stevenson	(England) Cheltenham Town	4 October 2025	
30 June 2025	CAM	(England) Dan Barton			
30 June 2025	CM	(England) Gary Gardner			
30 June 2025	CF	(England) Amaru Kaunda			

=== New Contract ===
Date	Pos.	Player	Contract until	Ref.
10 June 2025	LW	(Sierra Leone) Sullay Kaikai	30 June 2027	
10 June 2025	LB	(England) Liam Bennett	30 June 2027	
22 December 2025	CM	(England) George Hoddle	30 June 2028	
8 January 2026	CB	(England) Kelland Watts	30 June 2027	
9 February 2026	LW	(England) Ben Knight	30 June 2028	
17 February 2026	CAM	(Republic of Ireland) Glenn McConnell	30 June 2028	

== Pre-season and friendlies ==
On 15 May, Cambridge United announced their initial pre-season schedule, with games against Cambridge City, Northampton Town (BCD), Braintree Town and Cardiff City (BCD). A fifth friendly was later added against Charlton Athletic.

Win Draw Loss Fixtures

5 July 2025 Friendly	Cambridge City	1–3	Cambridge United	Sawston
13:00 BST	Salako 22'	Report	Morrison 15'; Rossi 49'; Kachunga 88'	Stadium: FWD-IP Community Stadium; Attendance: 2,640

8 July 2025 Friendly	Northampton Town	0–3	Cambridge United	Moulton
12:00 BST		Report	Kaikai; Brophy; Kachunga	Stadium: Moulton College; Attendance: 0 (Behind closed doors)

15 July 2025 Friendly	Braintree Town	0–3	Cambridge United	Braintree
19:45 BST		Report	Kaikai 13'; Watts 48'; Knight 67'	Stadium: Cressing Road

18 July 2025 Friendly	Cardiff City	5–1	Cambridge United	Vale of Glamorgan
13:00 BST	Davies; Robinson; Willock; Salech; Ashford	Report	Lavery	Stadium: Cardiff City Training Ground; Attendance: 0 (Behind-closed-doors)

26 July 2025 Friendly	Cambridge United	1–1	Charlton Athletic	Cambridge
15:00 BST	Hoddle 68'	Report	Leaburn 30'	Stadium: Abbey Stadium; Attendance: 2,003 (330 away fans); Referee: Neil Hair

== Competitions ==
=== Overall record ===
Competition	First match	Last match	Starting round	Final position	Record							
Competition	First match	Last match	Starting round	Final position	Pld	W	D	L	GF	GA	GD	Win %
League Two	2 August 2025	2 May 2026	Matchday 1	3rd	46	22	16	8	66	33	+33	47.83
FA Cup	1 November 2025	10 January 2026	First round	Third round	3	1	1	1	5	3	+2	33.33
EFL Cup	12 August 2025	23 September 2025	First round	Third round	3	2	0	1	5	2	+3	66.67
EFL Trophy	7 October 2025	2 December 2025	Group stage	Second round	4	2	1	1	8	6	+2	50.00
Total					56	27	18	11	84	44	+40	48.21

Last updated: 3 May 2026
Source: Soccerway

=== League Two ===
==== League table ====
Pos	Team	Pld	W	D	L	GF	GA	GD	Pts	Promotion, qualification or relegation
1	Bromley (C, P)	46	24	15	7	71	46	+25	87	Promotion to EFL League One
2	Milton Keynes Dons (P)	46	24	14	8	86	45	+41	86	Promotion to EFL League One
3	Cambridge United (P)	46	22	16	8	66	33	+33	82	Promotion to EFL League One
4	Salford City	46	25	6	15	61	51	+10	81	Qualification for League Two play-offs
5	Notts County (O, P)	46	24	8	14	74	52	+22	80	Qualification for League Two play-offs

Source: EFL Official Website
Rules for classification: 1) Points; 2) Goal difference; 3) Number of goals scored; 4) Head-to-head results; 5) Wins; 6) Away goals; 7) Penalty points (sec 9.5); 8) 12-point sending off offences
(C) Champions; (O) Play-off winners; (P) Promoted

==== Results summary ====
Overall								Home						Away					
Pld	W	D	L	GF	GA	GD	Pts	W	D	L	GF	GA	GD	W	D	L	GF	GA	GD
46	22	16	8	66	33	+33	82	15	6	2	43	15	+28	7	10	6	23	18	+5

Last updated: 3 May 2026.
Source: Soccerway

==== Results by round ====
Round	1	2	3	4	5	6	7	8	9	10	11	12	13	14	15	16	17	18	19	20	21	22	23	24	27	28	29	30	31	26^{2}	32	33	34	35	36	37	38	39	40	41	42	43	44	25^{1}	45	46
Ground	H	A	H	A	A	H	H	A	H	A	H	A	H	A	A	H	A	H	H	A	H	A	A	H	A	H	H	A	A	A	H	H	A	H	A	H	A	H	A	H	A	H	A	H	H	A
Result	W	L	D	W	L	W	L	D	W	D	W	L	W	L	D	D	W	W	D	D	W	D	W	W	W	W	W	W	L	W	W	D	W	D	D	W	D	W	L	D	D	W	D	L	W	D
Position	5	12	15	9	13	10	12	13	9	10	7	11	8	13	12	12	10	6	6	9	8	8	8	5	6	4	3	2	5	3	2	3	2	2	3	3	3	3	4	4	4	3	3	3	3	3
Points	3	3	4	7	7	10	10	11	14	15	18	18	21	21	22	23	26	29	30	31	34	35	38	41	44	47	50	53	53	56	59	60	63	64	65	68	69	72	72	73	74	77	78	78	81	82

Source: EFL
A = Away; H = Home; W = Win; D = Draw; L = Loss; P = Postponed
Notes:
- ^{1} Matchday 25 (vs. Grimsby Town) was postponed due to a frozen pitch. Then again due to international call-ups.
- ^{2} Matchday 26 (vs. Crawley Town) was postponed due to FA Cup involvements.

==== Matches ====
On 26 June, the League Two fixtures were announced, with Cambridge hosting Cheltenham Town on the opening day.

Win Draw Loss Fixtures

2 August 2025 1	Cambridge United	1–0	Cheltenham Town	Cambridge
15:00 BST	Appéré 59'	Report	Power (yellow card) 34'; Young (yellow card) 39'	Stadium: Abbey Stadium; Attendance: 6,673 (301 away fans); Referee: Craig Hicks

9 August 2025 2	Swindon Town	3–2	Cambridge United	Swindon
15:00 BST	Drinan 32'; Smith 34'; Oldaker 53'; Munroe (yellow card) 82'; Butterworth (yellow card) 90+6'	Report	Brophy 4' (yellow card) 90+6'; Kaikai 64'	Stadium: County Ground; Attendance: 8,862; Referee: Edward Duckworth

16 August 2025 3	Cambridge United	1–1	Harrogate Town	Cambridge
15:00 BST	Appéré 18'; Knight (yellow card) 70'	Report	Evans (yellow card) 17'; Duke-McKenna 52'	Stadium: Abbey Stadium; Attendance: 5,737; Referee: Kirsty Dowle

19 August 2025 4	Colchester United	1–2	Cambridge United	Colchester
19:45 BST	Read 13'; Payne (yellow card) 44'; Tovide (yellow card) 67'	Report	Jobe (yellow card) 39' (goal) 45+2'; Brophy 45'; Ball (yellow card) 56'; Watts (yellow card) 68'; Bennett (yellow card) 90+3'	Stadium: Colchester Community Stadium; Attendance: 6,834 (1,501 away fans); Referee: Richard Eley

23 August 2025 5	Bristol Rovers	1–0	Cambridge United	Horfield
15:00 BST	Hutchinson (yellow card) 5'; Harrison 34'; Southwood (yellow card) 41'	Report	Gibbons (yellow card) 15'; Jobe (yellow card) 80' (yellow-red card) 90+10'	Stadium: Memorial Stadium; Attendance: 6,809; Referee: Paul Marsden

30 August 2025 6	Cambridge United	2–0	Newport County	Cambridge
15:00 BST	Watts 38'; Brophy 75'	Report	Glennon (yellow card) 60'	Stadium: Abbey Stadium; Attendance: 5,887 (293 away fans); Referee: Garreth Rhodes

6 September 2025 7	Cambridge United	0–1	Oldham Athletic	Cambridge
15:00 BST	Purrington (yellow card) 40'; Lavery (yellow card) 80'; Kachunga (yellow card) 82'	Report	Mellon 21'; Hudson (yellow card) 44'; Caprice (yellow card) 78'	Stadium: Abbey Stadium; Attendance: 6.570 (740 away); Referee: Ben Atkinson

13 September 2025 8	Grimsby Town	1–1	Cambridge United	Cleethorpes
15:00 BST	McEachran (yellow card) 39'; Kabia (yellow card) 45+4'; Sweeney (yellow card) 54'; Amaluzor 90+7'	Report	Purrington (yellow card) 16'; Mayor 31'; Mpanzu (yellow card) 50'; Gibbons (yellow card) 84'; Brophy (yellow card) 90+4'	Stadium: Blundell Park; Attendance: 7,147; Referee: Greg Rollason

20 September 2025 9	Cambridge United	2–1	Fleetwood Town	Cambridge
12:30 BST	Ball (yellow card) 38'; Mayor 67'; Lavery 69'	Report	Davies 62'	Stadium: Abbey Stadium; Attendance: 5,069 (98 away fans); Referee: Lee Swabey
Note: Fixture was originally scheduled for a 15:00 kick-off, but was moved live Sky Sports broadcasting.

27 September 2025 10	Tranmere Rovers	0–0	Cambridge United	Birkenhead
15:00 BST	Ironside (yellow card) 53'	Report	Mayor (yellow card) 32'; Ball (yellow card) 90+2'	Stadium: Prenton Park; Attendance: 7,319; Referee: Adam Herczeg

4 October 2025 11	Cambridge United	3–1	Crawley Town	Cambridge
15:00 BST	Lavery 13'; Mpanzu 50'; Kouassi 57'; Bennett (yellow card) 88'; Eastwood (yellow card) 90+2'	Report	Holohan (yellow card) 6'; Barker (yellow card) 49'; Tshimanga 66'; Scott (yellow card) 72'; Brown (yellow card) 87'; Roles (yellow card) 90+2'	Stadium: Abbey Stadium; Attendance: 6,607; Referee: Carl Brook

11 October 2025 12	Shrewsbury Town	2–0	Cambridge United	Shrewsbury
15:00 BST	Lloyd 12'; Boyle 36'; Sang (yellow card) 54'; Scully (yellow card) 57'	Report	Smith (yellow card) 55'	Stadium: New Meadow; Attendance: 4,827; Referee: Matthew Russell

18 October 2025 13	Cambridge United	2–1	Bromley	Cambridge
12:30 BST	Lavery 2' (yellow card) 62'; Kouassi 41'; Mpanzu (yellow card) 62'	Report	Samuel (yellow card) 17'; Cheek 50'	Stadium: Abbey Stadium; Attendance: 5,839; Referee: Declan Bourne
Note: Fixture was originally scheduled for a 15:00 kick-off, but was rescheduled for live Sky Sports broadcasting.

25 October 2025 14	Notts County	2–0	Cambridge United	Nottingham
15:00 BST	Jatta 72', 90'	Report	Lavery (yellow card) 30'; Kaikai (yellow card) 53'; Mpanzu (yellow card) 54'; Morrison (yellow card) 90+1'	Stadium: Meadow Lane; Attendance: 10,996; Referee: Ross Joyce

8 November 2025 15	Salford City	0–0	Cambridge United	Kersal
15:00 GMT	Garbutt (yellow card) 5'; Udoh (yellow card) 55'; N'mai (yellow card) 70'; Borini (yellow card) 82'	Report	Bennett (yellow card) 15'; Mayor (yellow card) 90+2'	Stadium: Moor Lane; Referee: Ollie Yates

15 November 2025 16	Cambridge United	0–0	Barnet	Cambridge
15:00 GMT	Mpanzu (yellow card) 63'; Morrison (yellow card) 89'	Report		Stadium: Abbey Stadium; Attendance: 7,572; Referee: Simon Mather

22 November 2025 17	Barrow	0–2	Cambridge United	Barrow-in-Furness
15:00 GMT	Gordon (yellow card) 85'	Report	Smith (yellow card) 37'; Mpanzu 49', 90+1' (yellow card) 90'	Stadium: Holker Street; Attendance: 3,024; Referee: Scott Oldham

29 November 2025 18	Cambridge United	2–1	Crewe Alexandra	Cambridge
15:00 GMT	Smith (yellow card) 37'; Jobe 82'; Knight 90+7' (pen.)	Report	Tezgel 54'; Lunt (yellow card) 90+5'; March (yellow card) 90+6'	Stadium: Abbey Stadium; Attendance: 5,947; Referee: Martin Woods

9 December 2025 19	Cambridge United	1–1	Chesterfield	Cambridge
19:45 GMT	Watts 13'	Report	McFadzean 90+3'	Stadium: Abbey Stadium; Attendance: 5,192; Referee: Elliot Swallow

13 December 2025 20	Milton Keynes Dons	1–1	Cambridge United	Denbigh
15:00 GMT	Maguire (yellow card) 15'; Paterson 42'; Thompson-Sommers (yellow card) 50'	Report	Knight (yellow card) 52'; Kaikai 66'	Stadium: Stadium MK; Attendance: 8,151; Referee: James Oldham

19 December 2025 21	Cambridge United	2–0	Accrington Stanley	Cambridge
19:45 GMT	Watts (yellow card) 32'; Gibbons 45+5'; Kaikai 60'	Report		Stadium: Abbey Stadium; Attendance: 5,788; Referee: Richie Watkins
Note: Fixture was originally scheduled for 20 December, but was moved following an agreement between the two sides.

26 December 2025 22	Gillingham	1–1	Cambridge United	Gillingham
15:00 GMT	Clark 72'; Rowe (yellow card) 85'	Report	Appéré 10'	Stadium: Priestfield Stadium; Attendance: 7,344; Referee: Neil Hair

29 December 2025 23	Chesterfield	0–1	Cambridge United	Chesterfield
19:45 GMT	Hemming (yellow card) 76'	Report	Hoddle (yellow card) 16'; McLoughlin 44'; Lavery (yellow card) 72'; Gibbons (yellow card) 76'; Eastwood (yellow card) 82'	Stadium: SMH Group Stadium; Attendance: 8,589; Referee: Scott Jackson

1 January 2026 24	Cambridge United	2–0	Walsall	Cambridge
15:00 GMT	Knight 45+2', 53'	Report	Browne (yellow card) 90+2'	Stadium: Abbey Stadium; Attendance: 7,277; Referee: Wayne Cartmel

17 January 2026 27	Fleetwood Town	1–2	Cambridge United	Fleetwood
15:00 GMT	Evans (yellow card) 39'; Helm (yellow card) 53'; Ennis 74' (pen.); Mullarkey (yellow card) 90+6'	Report	Kaikai 31'; Gibbons 82'	Stadium: Highbury Stadium; Attendance: 2,666; Referee: Craig Hicks

24 January 2026 28	Cambridge United	4–2	Tranmere Rovers	Cambridge
15:00 GMT	Hoddle (yellow card) 19'; Brophy (yellow card) 35'; Lavery 58'; Watts 67', 77'; Knight 90+6'	Report	Smith (yellow card) 15'; Jones 45'; Blacker (yellow card) 54'; Whitaker 63'; McGowan (yellow card) 86'	Stadium: Abbey Stadium; Attendance: 6,800; Referee: Ross Martin

27 January 2026 29	Cambridge United	1–0	Shrewsbury Town	Cambridge
19:45 GMT	Appéré (yellow card) 59'; Knight 90+1' (pen.)	Report	Clucas (yellow card) 90+1'	Stadium: Abbey Stadium; Attendance: 5,347; Referee: Abigail Byrne

31 January 2026 30	Oldham Athletic	0–3	Cambridge United	Oldham
15:00 GMT	Drummond (yellow card) 45+2'; Quigley (yellow card) 46'	Report	Ball (yellow card) 41'; Knight 55' (pen.); Appéré 60', 67'; Lavery (yellow card) 87'	Stadium: Boundary Park; Attendance: 7,012; Referee: Ruebyn Ricardo

7 February 2026 31	Harrogate Town	2–1	Cambridge United	Harrogate
15:00 GMT	Morris 8'; Sutton 24'; Acquah (yellow card) 30'; Taylor (yellow card) 36'; Evans (yellow card) 74'; Gray (yellow card) 87'	Report	Bennett 29'	Stadium: Wetherby Road; Attendance: 3,370 (1,054 away fans); Referee: Edward Duckworth

10 February 2026 26	Crawley Town	0–3	Cambridge United	Crawley
19:45 GMT	Darcy (yellow card) 37'; Gordon (yellow card) 88'; Williams (yellow card) 90+4'	Report	McLoughlin 44'; Kaikai 76', 90+5'	Stadium: Broadfield Stadium; Attendance: 2,961; Referee: Alex Chilowicz
Note: Fixture was originally scheduled for 10 January, but was postponed due to FA Cup involvements.

14 February 2026 32	Cambridge United	3–1	Bristol Rovers	Cambridge
15:00 GMT	Knight 34', 56' (pen.); Purrington (yellow card) 44'; Watts 79'	Report	Quigley 45+3' (pen.); Sparkes (yellow card) 59'; Harrison (yellow card) 72'	Stadium: Abbey Stadium; Attendance: 6,424; Referee: Thomas Parsons

17 February 2026 33	Cambridge United	1–1	Colchester United	Cambridge
19:45 GMT	Watts 3'; Purrington (yellow card) 43'; Gibbons (yellow card) 84'	Report	Bishop (yellow card) 22'; Payne 30'; Read (yellow card) 90+5'	Stadium: Abbey Stadium; Attendance: 6,764; Referee: Declan Brown

21 February 2026 34	Newport County	0–2	Cambridge United	Newport
15:00 GMT	Lloyd (yellow card) 41'; Sprangler (yellow card) 50'	Report	Mpanzu (yellow card) 13'; Ball (yellow card) 56'; Bennett 73'; Kaikai 76'	Stadium: Rodney Parade; Attendance: 4,155; Referee: Lewis Sandoe

28 February 2026 35	Cambridge United	1–1	Milton Keynes Dons	Cambridge
12:30 GMT	Lavery 75'; Nevitt (yellow card) 83'	Report	Mellish (yellow card) 54'; Sanders (yellow card) 55'; Collins 90+6' (pen.)	Stadium: Abbey Stadium; Attendance: 7,538; Referee: Declan Bourne
Note: Fixture was originally scheduled for a 15:00 kick-off, but was rescheduled for live Sky Sports broadcasting.

7 March 2026 36	Accrington Stanley	1–1	Cambridge United	Accrington
15:00 GMT	Rawson 25'; Grant (yellow card) 67'; Sass (yellow card) 84'	Report	Appéré 81'	Stadium: Crown Ground; Attendance: 2,322 (463 away fans); Referee: Jamie O'Connor

14 March 2026 37	Cambridge United	5–0	Gillingham	Cambridge
15:00 GMT	Ball 2'; Appéré 36'; Cirino 50' (o.g.); Kaikai 54'; Lavery 90+1'	Report	Cirino (yellow card) 28'; Smith (yellow card) 42'; Dack (yellow card) 84'	Stadium: Abbey Stadium; Attendance: 7,490; Referee: Michael Barlow

17 March 2026 38	Walsall	0–0	Cambridge United	Bescot
19:45 GMT		Report	Kaikai (yellow card) 24'; Ball (yellow card) 59'	Stadium: Bescot Stadium; Attendance: 5,311; Referee: Simon Mather

21 March 2026 39	Cambridge United	1–0	Salford City	Cambridge
12:30 GMT	Gibbons 49' (yellow card) 83'; Mpanzu (yellow card) 71'	Report	Mnoga (yellow card) 22'; Grant (yellow card) 62'; Borini (yellow card) 81'; Graydon (yellow card) 83'	Stadium: Abbey Stadium; Attendance: 6,633; Referee: Alan Dale
Note: Fixture was initially scheduled for a 15:00 kick-off, but was brought forward for Sky Sports broadcasting.

28 March 2026 40	Barnet	1–0	Cambridge United	Edgware
15:00 GMT	Collinge 49'	Report		Stadium: The Hive Stadium; Attendance: 4,410; Referee: Martin Woods

2 April 2026 41	Cambridge United	1–1	Swindon Town	Cambridge
20:00 BST	Knight 21'	Report	Nichols (yellow card) 16'; Borland (yellow card) 83'; Gibbons 90' (o.g.)	Stadium: Abbey Stadium; Attendance: 7,366 (1,034 away fans); Referee: Matt Corlett
Note: Fixture was initially scheduled for 3 April, but was moved for Sky Sports broadcasting.

6 April 2026 42	Cheltenham Town	1–1	Cambridge United	Cheltenham
15:00 BST	Eastwood 90+1' (o.g.)	Report	Kaikai 34'; Ball (yellow card) 59'	Stadium: Whaddon Road; Attendance: 4,149; Referee: James Oldham

11 April 2026 43	Cambridge United	4–0	Notts County	Cambridge
15:00 BST	Ball 2'; Lavery 28'; Gibbons 33', 55'; Eastwood (red card) 40'	Report	Bedeau (yellow card) 37'; Enoru (yellow card) 77'	Stadium: Abbey Stadium; Attendance: 7,983; Referee: Ben Speedie

16 April 2026 44	Bromley	0–0	Cambridge United	Bromley
20:00 BST	Sowunmi (yellow card) 90+3'	Report	Ball (yellow card) 47'; Smith (yellow card) 90+1'	Stadium: Hayes Lane; Referee: Sam Mulhall
Note: Fixture was initially scheduled for 18 April, but was brought forward two-days for Sky Sports broadcasting.

21 April 2026 25	Cambridge United	1–2	Grimsby Town	Cambridge
19:45 BST	Knight 41', (penalty missed) 59'	Report	Green 23'; Turi (yellow card) 42'; Kacurri (yellow card) 58'; McJannett 90+4'	Stadium: Abbey Stadium; Attendance: 7,779; Referee: Thomas Parsons
Note: Fixture was originally scheduled for 4 January, but it was postponed due to a frozen pitch. Then again on 24 March due to international call-ups.

25 April 2026 45	Cambridge United	3–0	Barrow	Cambridge
15:00 BST	Knight 34'; Gibbons 57'; Stanway 74' (o.g.)	Report	Williams (yellow card) 48'; Stanway (yellow card) 74'	Stadium: Abbey Stadium; Attendance: 7,512; Referee: Stephen Parkinson

2 May 2026 46	Crewe Alexandra	0–0	Cambridge United	Crewe
15:00 BST	Dancey (yellow card) 53'	Report	Knight (penalty missed) 25'; Kaikai (yellow card) 32'; Gibbons (yellow card) 53'; Mpanzu (yellow card) 84'	Stadium: Gresty Road; Attendance: 7,335; Referee: Neil Hair

=== FA Cup ===
Cambridge were drawn at home to Chester in the first round, away to Stockport County in the second round and home to Birmingham City in the third round.

Win Draw Loss Fixtures

1 November 2025 First round	Cambridge United	3–0	Chester	Cambridge
15:00 GMT	Kouassi 10', 35'; Watts (yellow card) 30'; Brophy 45+3'; Purrington (yellow card) 48'		Woodthorpe (yellow card) 9'; Bainbridge (yellow card) 39'	Stadium: Abbey Stadium; Attendance: 4,329; Referee: David Rock

6 December 2025 Second round	Stockport County	0–0 (a.e.t.) (4–5 p)	Cambridge United	Edgeley
15:00 GMT	Hunt (yellow card) 26'; Edun (yellow card) 104'		Watts (yellow card) 109'; Hoddle (yellow card) 117'	Stadium: Edgeley Park; Attendance: 5,105; Referee: Richard Eley
	Penalties
	Moxon (penalty missed); Osborn (penalty scored); Diamond (penalty scored); Wootton (penalty scored); O'Keeffe (penalty scored)		Smith (penalty scored); Watts (penalty scored); McConnell (penalty scored); Mayor (penalty scored); Gibbons (penalty scored)

10 January 2026 Third round	Cambridge United	2–3	Birmingham City	Cambridge
17:45 GMT	Kaikai 80', 89'; Hoddle (yellow card) 88'		Wagner 31'; Furuhashi 42'; Ducksch 78'	Stadium: Abbey Stadium; Attendance: 6,241; Referee: Matthew Corlett

=== EFL Cup ===
Cambridge were drawn away to Bristol Rovers in the first round, at home to Charlton Athletic in the second round and back away to Fulham in the third round.

Win Draw Loss Fixtures

12 August 2025 First round	Bristol Rovers	0–2	Cambridge United	Horfield
19:45 BST	Conteh (yellow card) 23'		Appéré 29'; Brophy (yellow card) 68'; Loft 75'	Stadium: Memorial Stadium; Attendance: 2,681; Referee: Oliver Mackey

26 August 2025 Second round	Cambridge United	3–1	Charlton Athletic	Cambridge
19:30 BST	Brophy 15'; Kouassi 29'; Bradshaw 55'		Olaofe (yellow card) 33'; Fullah 44'; Gillesphey (yellow card) 45+2'; Hobden (yellow card) 57'; Anderson (yellow card) 60' (yellow-red card) 90+12'	Stadium: Abbey Stadium; Attendance: 3,231; Referee: David Rock

23 September 2025 Third round	Fulham	1–0	Cambridge United	Fulham
19:45 BST	Reed (yellow card) 44'; Smith Rowe 66'	Report	Smith (yellow card) 45+2'	Stadium: Craven Cottage; Attendance: 16,254; Referee: Ruebyn Ricardo

=== EFL Trophy ===
Cambridge were drawn against Barnet, Luton Town and Brighton & Hove Albion U21 in the group stage. After finishing second in the group stage, The U's were drawn away to Bristol Rovers in the round of 32.

Pos	Div	Team	Pld	W	PW	PL	L	GF	GA	GD	Pts	Qualification
1	L1	Luton Town	3	2	0	0	1	8	5	+3	6	Advance to Round 2
2	L2	Cambridge United	3	2	0	0	1	6	4	+2	6	Advance to Round 2
3	L2	Barnet	3	1	1	0	1	5	7	−2	5	
4	ACA	Brighton & Hove Albion U21	3	0	0	1	2	2	5	−3	1	

Source: EFL

Win Draw Loss Fixtures

7 October 2025 Sou. Group H	Cambridge United	3–1	Luton Town	Cambridge
19:00 BST	McConnell 33'; Kachunga 46', 80'		Andersen 15'; Morris (yellow card) 44'	Stadium: Abbey Stadium; Attendance: 1,767; Referee: Jacob Miles

21 October 2025 Sou. Group H	Barnet	3–2	Cambridge United	Edgware
19:00 GMT	Ndlovu 2'; Osadebe (yellow card) 31' (goal) 90'; Crichlow (yellow card) 51'; Assombalonga 72'		Hawkins 20' (o.g.); Kachunga 33'; Bradshaw (yellow card) 45+4'	Stadium: The Hive Stadium; Attendance: 692; Referee: Sam Mulhall

5 November 2025 Sou. Group H	Cambridge United	1–0	Brighton & Hove Albion U21	Cambridge
19:00 GMT	Mayor 6'		Brett (yellow card) 90+5'	Stadium: Abbey Stadium; Attendance: 599; Referee: Alan Young
Note: Fixture was originally scheduled for 23 September, but was postponed due to EFL Cup involvements.

2 December 2025 Round of 32	Bristol Rovers	2–2 (4–2 p)	Cambridge United	Horfield
19:00 GMT	Harrison 9' (pen.), 18'; Chang (yellow card) 51'; Conteh (yellow card) 77'; Howley (yellow card) 84'; Mola (yellow card) 87'; Southwood (yellow card) 90+1'	Report	Hoddle (yellow card) 66'; Watts 68'; Kaikai 90+4' (pen.)	Stadium: Memorial Stadium; Attendance: 878; Referee: James Durkin
	Penalties
	Cavegn (penalty scored); Sparkes (penalty scored); Thomas (penalty scored); Morton (penalty missed); Conteh (penalty scored)		Kaikai (penalty missed); Brophy (penalty scored); Munday (penalty missed); Ruddock Mpanzu (penalty scored)

== Statistics ==
=== Appearances and goals ===
As of match played 2 May 2026

Players with no appearances are not included on the list

No.	Pos	Nat	Player	Total		League Two		FA Cup		EFL Cup		EFL Trophy	
No.	Pos	Nat	Player	Apps	Goals	Apps	Goals	Apps	Goals	Apps	Goals	Apps	Goals
1	GK	(England) ENG	Jake Eastwood	51	0	45+0	0	3+0	0	3+0	0	0+0	0
2	DF	(England) ENG	Liam Bennett	49	2	37+3	2	2+1	0	2+1	0	2+1	0
3	DF	(England) ENG	Ben Purrington	38	0	18+16	0	1+2	0	0+0	0	1+0	0
4	MF	(England) ENG	Dominic Ball	40	2	30+5	2	2+0	0	0+3	0	0+0	0
5	DF	(England) ENG	Michael Morrison	18	0	14+3	0	1+0	0	0+0	0	0+0	0
6	DF	(England) ENG	Kelland Watts	52	7	46+0	6	2+0	0	2+0	0	0+2	1
7	MF	(England) ENG	James Brophy	53	5	34+9	3	3+0	1	2+1	1	2+2	0
8	MF	(England) ENG	Korey Smith	28	0	8+15	0	1+1	0	1+0	0	2+0	0
9	FW	(Scotland) SCO	Louis Appéré	44	8	34+6	7	1+0	0	1+1	1	0+1	0
10	FW	(Democratic Republic of the Congo) COD	Elias Kachunga	26	3	4+13	0	1+1	0	2+1	0	4+0	3
11	FW	(Sierra Leone) SLE	Sullay Kaikai	52	12	34+9	9	2+1	2	1+2	0	1+2	1
12	GK	(England) ENG	Jack Walton	1	0	1+0	0	0+0	0	0+0	0	0+0	0
14	FW	(England) ENG	Ben Knight	46	11	29+7	11	3+0	0	1+2	0	4+0	0
15	FW	(England) ENG	Adam Mayor	34	3	24+3	2	0+2	0	1+0	0	1+3	1
16	DF	(England) ENG	Zeno Ibsen Rossi	12	0	1+4	0	1+0	0	2+0	0	4+0	0
17	MF	(Democratic Republic of the Congo) COD	Pelly Ruddock Mpanzu	55	3	38+7	3	2+1	0	3+0	0	2+2	0
18	FW	(England) ENG	Ryan Loft	4	1	0+3	0	0+0	0	0+1	1	0+0	0
19	FW	(Northern Ireland) NIR	Shayne Lavery	32	7	6+24	7	0+1	0	1+0	0	0+0	0
20	FW	(England) ENG	Kylian Kouassi	19	5	8+6	2	1+0	2	1+1	1	0+2	0
21	DF	(Republic of Ireland) IRL	Shane McLoughlin	26	2	13+9	2	0+1	0	3+0	0	0+0	0
22	DF	(England) ENG	Zak Bradshaw	9	1	2+0	0	1+0	0	3+0	1	3+0	0
23	DF	(England) ENG	Mamadou Jobe	49	2	34+7	2	2+0	0	2+0	0	4+0	0
24	FW	(England) ENG	Elliott Nevitt	16	0	1+15	0	0+0	0	0+0	0	0+0	0
25	GK	(Wales) WAL	Ben Hughes	5	0	0+1	0	0+0	0	0+0	0	4+0	0
26	DF	(England) ENG	James Gibbons	45	6	33+6	6	2+0	0	2+0	0	2+0	0
27	FW	(Republic of Ireland) IRL	Glenn McConnell	13	1	3+3	0	0+2	0	0+1	0	4+0	1
28	DF	(England) ENG	Sean Raggett	3	0	0+3	0	0+0	0	0+0	0	0+0	0
29	FW	(England) ENG	George Munday	2	0	0+0	0	0+1	0	0+0	0	0+1	0
38	MF	(England) ENG	George Hoddle	24	0	9+7	0	2+1	0	0+1	0	4+0	0
39	MF	(England) ENG	Lohan Mcdougald	1	0	0+0	0	0+0	0	0+0	0	0+1	0
