= Louis Appéré =

Scottish footballer (born 1999)

- Appéré with Cambridge United in 2026

Personal information
- Full name: Louis George Pierre Appéré
- Date of birth: 26 March 1999 (age 27)
- Place of birth: Perth, Scotland
- Height: 6 ft 1 in (1.85 m)
- Position: Forward

Team information
- Current team: Cambridge United
- Number: 9

Youth career
- East Fife Junior Supporters' Club
- Dunfermline Athletic
- 2015–2016: AM Soccer

Senior career*
| Years | Team | Apps | (Gls) |
| 2016–2022 | Dundee United | 61 | (6) |
| 2019 | → Broughty Athletic (loan) | 20 | (22) |
| 2022–2024 | Northampton Town | 98 | (17) |
| 2024–2025 | Stevenage | 17 | (0) |
| 2025– | Cambridge United | 53 | (8) |
- * Club domestic league appearances and goals as of 08:30, 7 November 2026 (UTC)

Louis George Pierre Appéré (born 26 March 1999) is a Scottish footballer who plays as a forward for EFL League One club Cambridge United. He made his senior debut in August 2017.

== Early life ==
Louis Appéré was born in Perth on 26 March 1999. He grew up in Cupar, Fife, where he attended Bell Baxter High School. He started playing football for East Fife Junior Supporters' Club at the age of 9 and later spent two years as a youth player with Dunfermline Athletic. He then joined Cupar-based AM Soccer, progressing through from the youth system.

== Club career ==
Appéré began the 2015–16 season playing youth football, before progressing to AM Soccer's adult amateur team as well as appearing as a trialist for Raith Rovers' under-20 development team. In May 2016 he went to Italy for a trial with A.S. Roma after AM Soccer owner Austin MacPhee brought a YouTube video of the player to Roma's attention. In July 2016, Appéré signed for Scottish Championship club Dundee United, whose manager Ray McKinnon had previously had him on trial at Raith.

Appéré made his first team debut for Dundee United as a substitute in a Scottish Challenge Cup tie against Cowdenbeath on 15 August 2017. He signed a new two-year contract with the club in May 2018.

In January 2019, Appéré joined Scottish Junior Football East Region Super League club Broughty Athletic on loan until the end of the 2018–19 season. After scoring 22 goals in 20 appearances for Broughty, he returned to Dundee United and was able to break into the first team squad on a regular basis.

He scored his first goal for Dundee United on 19 July 2019 in a Scottish League Cup tie against Cowdenbeath. His first league goal came on 30 August 2019, the second goal in a 6–2 victory in the Dundee derby against Dundee. On 17 October 2019, the club announced that Appéré had extended his contract with Dundee United until the summer of 2022. He went on to score 6 goals in 33 appearances during the 2019-20 season as Dundee United won the Championship title.

Following United's promotion to the Scottish Premiership, Appéré initially struggled for playing time. He scored his first top-flight goal against St Johnstone on 12 January 2021, and also assisted Lawrence Shankland to score from 53 yards in the same match.

=== Northampton Town ===
On 31 January 2022, Appéré joined EFL League Two club Northampton Town for an undisclosed fee, signing a two-and-a-half-year deal.

Following the conclusion of the 2023–24 season, he was offered a new contract which he subsequently rejected.

=== Stevenage ===
On 24 May 2024, Appéré agreed to join League One side Stevenage upon the expiration of his Northampton Town contract.

=== Cambridge United ===
Appéré joined League Two club Cambridge United in July 2025 on a two-year deal for an undisclosed fee. He made his debut in the opening game of the 2025-26 season, scoring the only goal in a 1-0 win at home to Cheltenham Town.

== International career ==
Appéré was born in Scotland and is of French descent, and holds both passports. He received his first call-up to the Scotland under-21 team for scheduled fixtures in March 2020 against Croatia and Greece, only for the matches to be postponed due to the COVID-19 pandemic.

== Career statistics ==
As of match played 6 November 2026

| Club | Season | League | | | National cup (Note: Includes Scottish Cup, FA Cup) | | League cup (Note: Includes Scottish League Cup, EFL Cup) | | Other | | Total | |
| Club | Season | Division | Apps | Goals | Apps | Goals | Apps | Goals | Apps | Goals | Apps | Goals |
|---|---|---|---|---|---|---|---|---|---|---|---|---|
| Dundee United | 2017–18 | Scottish Championship | 0 | 0 | 0 | 0 | 0 | 0 | 1 (Note: Appearances in the Scottish Challenge Cup) | 0 | 1 | 0 |
| Dundee United | 2018–19 | Scottish Championship | 0 | 0 | 0 | 0 | 1 | 0 | 2 | 0 | 3 | 0 |
| Dundee United | 2019–20 | Scottish Championship | 26 | 4 | 2 | 1 | 4 | 1 | 1 | 0 | 33 | 6 |
| Dundee United | 2020–21 | Scottish Premiership | 22 | 1 | 2 | 0 | 4 | 0 | 0 | 0 | 28 | 1 |
| Dundee United | 2021–22 | Scottish Premiership | 13 | 1 | 1 | 0 | 1 | 0 | 0 | 0 | 15 | 1 |
| Dundee United | Total | | 61 | 6 | 5 | 1 | 10 | 1 | 4 | 0 | 80 | 8 |
| Northampton Town | 2021–22 | League Two | 18 | 3 | 0 | 0 | 0 | 0 | 2 (Note: Appearances in League Two play-offs) | 0 | 20 | 3 |
| Northampton Town | 2022–23 | League Two | 43 | 8 | 0 | 0 | 1 | 1 | 1 (Note: Appearances in EFL Trophy) | 0 | 45 | 9 |
| Northampton Town | 2023–24 | League One | 37 | 6 | 1 | 0 | 1 | 0 | 2 | 0 | 41 | 6 |
| Northampton Town | Total | | 98 | 17 | 1 | 0 | 2 | 1 | 5 | 0 | 106 | 18 |
| Stevenage | 2024–25 | League One | 17 | 0 | 0 | 0 | 1 | 1 | 2 | 0 | 20 | 1 |
| Cambridge United | 2025–26 | League Two | 40 | 7 | 1 | 0 | 2 | 1 | 1 | 0 | 44 | 8 |
| Cambridge United | 2026–27 | League One | 13 | 1 | 1 | 0 | 2 | 0 | 2 | 1 | 18 | 2 |
| Cambridge United | Total | | 53 | 8 | 2 | 0 | 4 | 1 | 3 | 1 | 62 | 10 |
| Career total | | | 229 | 31 | 8 | 1 | 17 | 4 | 12 | 1 | 268 | 37 |

== Honours ==
Northampton Town

- EFL League Two promotion: 2022–23
