= Zak Bradshaw =

English footballer (born 2003)

- Bradshaw with Cambridge United in 2026

Personal information
- Full name: Zak Dominic Bradshaw
- Date of birth: 22 September 2003 (age 23)
- Place of birth: Hatfield, England
- Height: 1.85 m (6 ft 1 in)
- Positions: Centre-back; left-back; left midfielder

Team information
- Current team: Cambridge United
- Number: 22

Youth career
- Ipswich Town

Senior career*
Years	Team	Apps	(Gls)
2020–2024	Ipswich Town	0	(0)
2021	→ Bury Town (loan)	7	(0)
2022	→ Chelmsford City (loan)	14	(1)
2022–2023	→ Bromley (loan)	1	(0)
2023	→ Braintree Town (loan)	7	(2)
2023–2024	→ Woking (loan)	19	(1)
2024–2025	Lincoln City	0	(0)
2024	→ Dundalk (loan)	18	(0)
2024–2025	→ Tranmere Rovers (loan)	27	(0)
2025–	Cambridge United	16	(2)
- * Club domestic league appearances and goals as of 08:26, 7 November 2025 (UTC)

Zak Dominic Bradshaw (born 22 September 2003) is an English professional footballer who plays as a centre-back for EFL League One club Cambridge United.

== Club career ==
=== Ipswich Town ===
Bradshaw progressed through the academy at Ipswich Town before loan spells at Bury Town, Chelmsford City, Bromley, Braintree Town and Woking, where he gained regular first-team football. On 1 July 2022, Bradshaw signed his first professional contract with Ipswich.

=== Lincoln City ===
On 2 February 2024, Bradshaw signed for Lincoln City on two-and-a-half year contract on a free transfer, before being loaned out to Irish club Dundalk.

The following season, he was loaned to League Two side Tranmere Rovers on a season-long loan. He made his English Football League debut on the opening day of the season coming off the bench to replace Lee O'Connor against Notts County.

=== Cambridge United ===
On 26 June 2025, Bradshaw joined Cambridge United on a two-year deal for a free transfer, with Lincoln City holding a future interest in the player. He made his debut in the EFL Cup, starting the game in a 2–0 win away to Bristol Rovers. He scored his first goal in the next round, scoring the third goal in a 3–1 win against Charlton Athletic.

== Career statistics ==
As of match played 6 November 2026

Appearances and goals by club, season and competition
Club	Season	League			National Cup		League Cup		Other		Total	
Club	Season	Division	Apps	Goals	Apps	Goals	Apps	Goals	Apps	Goals	Apps	Goals
Ipswich Town	2021–22	League One	0	0	0	0	0	0	0	0	0	0
Chelmsford City (loan)	2021–22	National League South	14	1	0	0	—		—		14	1
Bromley (loan)	2022–23	National League	1	0	0	0	—		—		1	0
Braintree Town (loan)	2022–23	National League South	7	2	0	0	—		1 (Note: Appearance(s) in National League South Playoffs)	0	8	2
Woking (loan)	2023–24	National League	19	1	1	0	—		—		20	1
Lincoln City	2023–24	League One	0	0	0	0	0	0	—		0	0
Lincoln City	2024–25	League One	0	0	0	0	0	0	—		0	0
Lincoln City	Total		0	0	0	0	0	0	0	0	0	0
Dundalk (loan)	2024	League of Ireland Premier Division	18	0	0	0	0	0	1 (Note: Appearance(s) in Leinster Senior Cup)	0	19	0
Tranmere Rovers (loan)	2024–25	League Two	27	0	0	0	2	0	4 (Note: Appearance(s) in EFL Trophy)	0	33	0
Cambridge United	2025–26	League Two	2	0	1	0	3	1	3 (Note: Appearance(s) in EFL Trophy)	0	9	1
Cambridge United	2026–27	League One	14	2	1	0	2	0	3	1	20	3
Cambridge United	Total		16	2	2	0	5	1	6	1	29	4
Career total			102	6	3	0	7	1	12	1	124	8
