= Mamadou Jobe =

English footballer (born 2003)

Personal information
- Full name: Mamadou Ousmane Jobe
- Date of birth: 2 March 2003 (age 23)
- Place of birth: Harlow, England
- Height: 1.85 m (6 ft 1 in)
- Position: Centre-back

Team information
- Current team: Stockport County
- Number: 25

Youth career
- Cambridge United

Senior career*
Years	Team	Apps	(Gls)
2021–2026	Cambridge United	48	(2)
2021	→ St Neots Town (loan)	8	(1)
2021–2022	→ Concord Rangers (loan)	19	(2)
2022–2023	→ St Albans City (loan)	4	(1)
2023	→ Maidstone United (loan)	13	(0)
2023–2024	→ Gateshead (loan)	20	(2)
2026–	Stockport County	0	(0)
- * Club domestic league appearances and goals as of 17:29, 22 August 2026 (UTC)

Mamadou Ousmane Jobe (born 2 March 2003) is an English professional footballer who plays as a centre-back for EFL League One club Stockport County.

He has also played on loan at St Neots Town, Concord Rangers, Maidstone United and Gateshead.

== Career ==
=== Cambridge United ===
Jobe came through the Cambridge United youth team and impressed manager Mark Bonner during pre-season training enough to start the 2021–22 campaign as the senior team's third-choice centre-back. He his first-team debut on 31 August 2021, in a 4–1 victory over Oxford United at the Abbey Stadium in the EFL Trophy.

Ahead of the 2024–25 season, Jobe ruptured his anterior cruciate ligament while doing physical conditioning work prior to pre-season.

==== Loan to St Neots Town ====
On 3 September 2021, he joined St Neots Town of the Southern League Division One Central on loan.

==== Loan to Concord Rangers ====
On 4 December 2021, he joined National League South club Concord Rangers on loan.

==== Loan to St Albans City ====
On 16 December 2022, Jobe joined National League South side St Albans City on loan for the remainder of the 2022-23 season.

==== Loan to Maidstone United ====
In January 2023, he joined National League club Maidstone United on loan.

==== Loan to Gateshead ====
In November 2023, he joined National League club Gateshead on loan until 2 January 2024. With his initial deal having expired, the deal was extended until 14 February 2024. His deal was extended to the end of the season on 17 February 2024, scoring his first goal for Gateshead on the same day, opening the scoring in a 4–2 win away at Wealdstone. On 23 March 2024, Jobe was recalled by Cambridge.

==== Stockport County ====
On 28 August 2026, Jobe joined Stockport County on a three-year deal for an undisclosed fee.

== Career statistics ==
As of match played 22 August 2026

Appearances and goals by club, season and competition
Club	Season	League			FA Cup		League Cup		Other		Total	
Club	Season	Division	Apps	Goals	Apps	Goals	Apps	Goals	Apps	Goals	Apps	Goals
Cambridge United	2021–22	League One	0	0	0	0	0	0	1 (Note: Appearance(s) in EFL Trophy)	0	1	0
Cambridge United	2022–23	League One	0	0	0	0	0	0	0	0	0	0
Cambridge United	2023–24	League One	5	0	0	0	0	0	3	0	8	0
Cambridge United	2024–25	League One	0	0	0	0	0	0	0	0	0	0
Cambridge United	2025–26	League Two	41	2	2	0	2	0	4	0	49	2
Cambridge United	2026–27	League One	2	0	0	0	1	0	0	0	3	0
Cambridge United	Total		48	2	2	0	3	0	8	0	61	2
St. Neots Town (loan)	2021–22	Southern League; Division One Central	8	1	0	0	3	0	0	0	11	1
Concord Rangers (loan)	2021–22	National League South	19	2	0	0	0	0	2	1	21	3
St Albans City (loan)	2022–23	National League South	4	1	0	0	0	0	0	0	4	1
Maidstone United (loan)	2022–23	National League	13	0	0	0	0	0	1	0	14	0
Gateshead (loan)	2023–24	National League	20	2	0	0	0	0	2	0	22	2
Career total			111	8	2	0	6	0	13	1	132	9
