= Samuel Okolie =

Seychelles footballer

Personal information
- Full name: Samuel Ebube Henrie Okolie
- Date of birth: 22 March 2008 (age 18)
- Place of birth: Australia
- Position: Forward

Team information
- Current team: Bishop's Stortford
- Number: 19

Youth career
- –2024: Wingate & Finchley
- 2024–2026: Cambridge United

Senior career*
Years	Team	Apps	(Gls)
2026	Cambridge United	0	(0)
2026	→ Newmarket Town (loan)	3	(1)
2026	→ St Neots Town (loan)	7	(0)
2026–	Bishop's Stortford	1	(0)

International career^{‡}
2025–	Seychelles	3	(0)
- * Club domestic league appearances and goals ‡ National team caps and goals as of 17:35, 13 January 2026 (UTC)

Samuel Okolie (born 22 March 2008) is a footballer who plays as a forward for Bishop's Stortford and the Seychelles national team.

== Club career ==
Based in Finchley, Okolie began playing football at age four or five and joined his first club at age eight. He played for his school team and several local clubs including Wingate & Finchley before being invited to trial at Cambridge United. He signed for the club's academy and joined the under-16 side in November 2024. After impressing team management during his first season, he was signed to a full scholarship and promoted to the under-18 team for the following year.

In January 2026, Okolie went on a short-term loan to Newmarket Town of the Isthmian League North Division. He debuted for the club on 31 January 2026 in a league match against Whitby Town. He scored the only goal of the game on his debut, giving Newmarket Town a 1–0 victory. The following month, he went on short-term loan again, this time to St Neots Town of the Northern Premier League Division One Midlands.

Okolie was released by Cambridge United in Summer 2026. Soon thereafter, he signed for Bishop's Stortford of the Southern League Premier Division Central. He debuted for the club on 8 August in its opening match against Banbury United.

== International career ==
Okolie was born in Australia and is of Nigerian descent. In 2025, he spent a month in training camp with the Seychelles national under-17 team in France. He played in seven matches against academies and senior clubs from the lower divisions, scoring nine or ten goals, during the camp. The following week he rejoined the team for an international youth tournament and was one of the best players in the competition with two goals in four matches against other national under-17 teams.

Following his experience with the national under-17 team, Okolie earned a senior call-up for 2026 FIFA World Cup qualifiers against Gabon and Kenya in September of that year. He made his senior international debut on 3 September 2025 in the match against Gabon.

=== International career statistics ===
As of match played 10 October 2025

Seychelles national team
Year	Apps	Goals
2025	3	0
Total	3	0

== Club statistics ==
As of match played 21 March 2026

Appearances and goals by club, season and competition
Club	Season	League			FA Cup		League Cup		Other		Total	
Club	Season	Division	Apps	Goals	Apps	Goals	Apps	Goals	Apps	Goals	Apps	Goals
Newmarket Town	2025–26	Isthmian League North Division	3	1	0	0	0	0	0	0	3	1
St Neots Town	2025–26	Northern Premier League Division One Midlands	6	0	0	0	0	0	0	0	6	0
Bishop's Stortford	2026–27	Southern League Premier Division Central	0	0	0	0	0	0	0	0	0	0
Career total			9	1	0	0	0	0	0	0	9	1
