= Matthew Hudson =

American football player (born 2000)

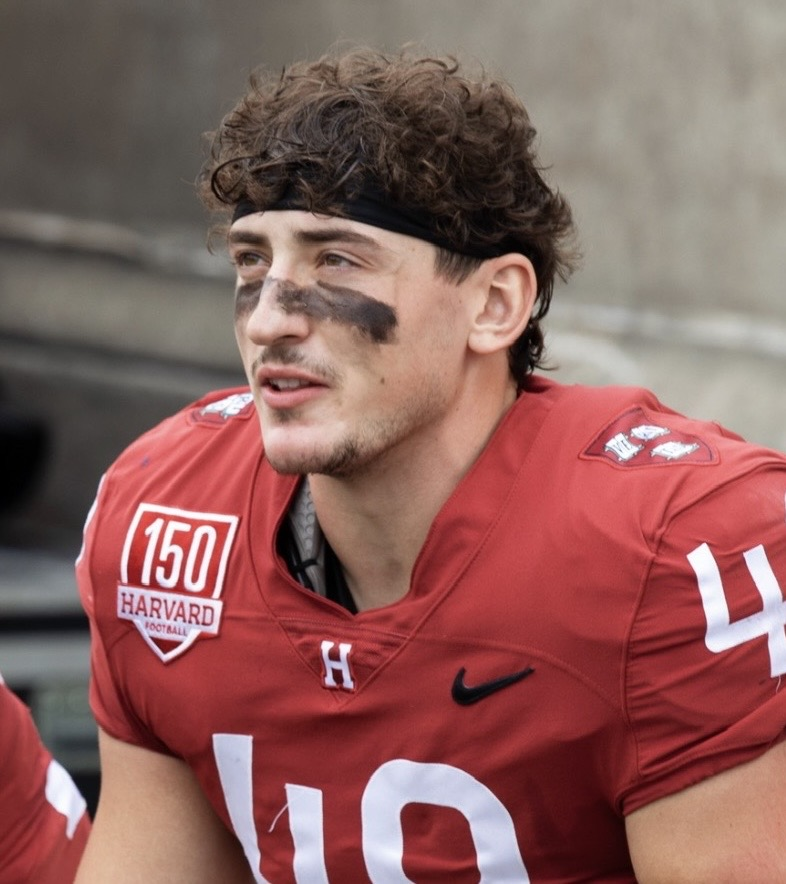
- Hudson with Harvard in 2023

No. 49
- Position: Linebacker

Personal information
- Born: October 19, 2000 (age 26); Boise, Idaho, U.S.
- Listed height: 6 ft 3 in (1.91 m)
- Listed weight: 230 lb (104 kg)

Career information
- High school: Eagle (Idaho); Fork Union Military Academy
- College: Harvard (2020–2023); Memphis (2024)

Awards and highlights
- Second-team All-Ivy League (2023); CSC Academic All-District Team (2022, 2023)
- Stats at ESPN

Matthew Hudson (born October 19, 2000), also listed as Matt Hudson, is an American football linebacker who played college football for the Harvard Crimson and Memphis Tigers.

== Early life ==
Hudson attended Eagle High School in Eagle, Idaho, and later spent a postgraduate year at Fork Union Military Academy in Virginia.

== College career ==
=== Harvard ===
Hudson joined Harvard in 2020. He played in 10 games in 2021, and ranked second on the team in tackles in both 2022 (50) and 2023 (66). In 2023, he earned second-team All-Ivy League honors and was named Harvard's most valuable player, receiving the Frederick Greeley Crocker Award.

=== Memphis ===
Hudson transferred to Memphis for the 2024 season and became a starter on defense. He recorded an interception against North Alabama in the season opener. In a win over Florida State, he totaled 1.5 tackles for loss and 0.5 sack. He finished the 2024 season with 65 tackles, one sack, one interception, and one fumble recovery.

== Professional career ==
Hudson participated in Cleveland Browns rookie minicamp in May 2025.
