= James Brophy (footballer) =

English footballer (born 1994)

Personal information
- Full name: James Robert Brophy
- Date of birth: 25 July 1994 (age 32)
- Place of birth: Brent, England
- Height: 5 ft 11 in (1.80 m)
- Position: Forward

Team information
- Current team: Gillingham
- Number: 16

Youth career
- –2010: Headstone Manor
- 2010–2012: Harrow Borough

Senior career*
Years	Team	Apps	(Gls)
2012–2013	Woodlands United		
2013	Belstone		
2013–2015	Broadfields United	45	(7)
2015	Edgware Town	7	(1)
2015–2018	Swindon Town	64	(0)
2017	→ Leyton Orient (loan)	9	(0)
2018–2021	Leyton Orient	121	(9)
2021–2026	Cambridge United	222	(7)
2026–	Gillingham	10	(3)
- * Club domestic league appearances and goals as of 10:40, 14 October 2026 (UTC)

James Robert Brophy (born 25 July 1994) is an English professional footballer who played as a winger for EFL League Two club Gillingham.

== Career ==
=== Swindon Town ===
Brophy joined Swindon Town in the summer of 2015 after several years playing in non-League football, with numerous clubs including Woodlands United, Belstone, Broadfields United and Edgware Town. The defender made his professional football debut as a second-half substitute in the League Cup game against Exeter City. He scored his first goal for the club against Queens Park Rangers in an EFL Cup tie on 10 August 2016.

=== Leyton Orient ===
On 21 September 2017, Brophy joined National League side Leyton Orient on a three-month loan deal until January 2018. Two days later, he made his Orient debut during their 2–2 away draw with Aldershot Town, featuring for the entire 90 minutes. On 24 November 2017, Brophy was recalled by parent club, Swindon, following increasing injury problems. He rejoined Leyton Orient on a permanent basis on 31 January 2018, signing a 2 1/2-year deal. Brophy was offered a new deal as his contract was due to be up at the end of June 2021 however he decided to turn down the offer to join Cambridge United F.C. He left the club making 149 appearances.

=== Cambridge United ===
On 11 June 2021, Brophy joined newly promoted EFL League One side Cambridge United F.C. on a three-year deal.

Having helped the club achieve an immediate promotion back to League One, he departed the club upon he expiry of his deal at the end of the 2025–26 season.

=== Gillingham ===
On 28 May 2026, Brophy agreed to return to League Two, joining Gillingham on a two-year deal. Brophy had a positive start to his life at The Gills and was nominated for the League Two player of the month award for September 2026 after scoring three goals during the month.

== Career statistics ==
As of match played 19 September 2026

Appearances and goals by club, season and competition
Club	Season	League			FA Cup		EFL Cup		Other		Total	
Club	Season	Division	Apps	Goals	Apps	Goals	Apps	Goals	Apps	Goals	Apps	Goals
Edgware Town	2014–15	Spartan South Midlands League Division One	7	1	0	0	—		0	0	7	1
Swindon Town	2015–16	League One	28	0	0	0	1	0	2 (Note: Appearance(s) in EFL Trophy)	0	31	0
Swindon Town	2016–17	League One	30	0	0	0	1	1	2	0	33	1
Swindon Town	2017–18	League Two	6	0	1	0	1	0	1	0	9	0
Swindon Town	Total		64	0	1	0	3	1	5	0	73	1
Leyton Orient (loan)	2017–18	National League	9	0	0	0	—		0	0	9	0
Leyton Orient	2017–18	National League	14	2	0	0	—		3 (Note: Appearance(s) in FA Trophy)	1	17	3
Leyton Orient	2018–19	National League	37	3	1	0	—		7	1	45	4
Leyton Orient	2019–20	League Two	34	2	1	0	1	0	2	0	38	2
Leyton Orient	2020–21	League Two	36	2	1	0	2	0	3	0	42	2
Leyton Orient	Total		130	9	3	0	3	0	15	2	151	11
Cambridge United	2021–22	League One	43	1	5	0	0	0	5	0	53	1
Cambridge United	2022–23	League One	44	0	3	0	1	0	3	0	51	0
Cambridge United	2023–24	League One	46	0	2	0	1	0	0	0	49	0
Cambridge United	2024–25	League One	46	3	2	1	1	0	4	0	53	4
Cambridge United	2025–26	League Two	43	3	3	1	3	1	4	0	53	5
Cambridge United	Total		222	7	15	2	6	1	16	0	259	10
Gillingham	2026–27	League Two	10	3	0	0	1	0	1	0	12	3
Gillingham	Total		10	3	0	0	1	0	1	0	12	3
Career total			432	20	19	2	13	2	37	2	501	26

== Honours ==
Leyton Orient

- National League: 2018–19
- FA Trophy runner-up: 2018–19
