= Ben Purrington =

English footballer (born 1996)

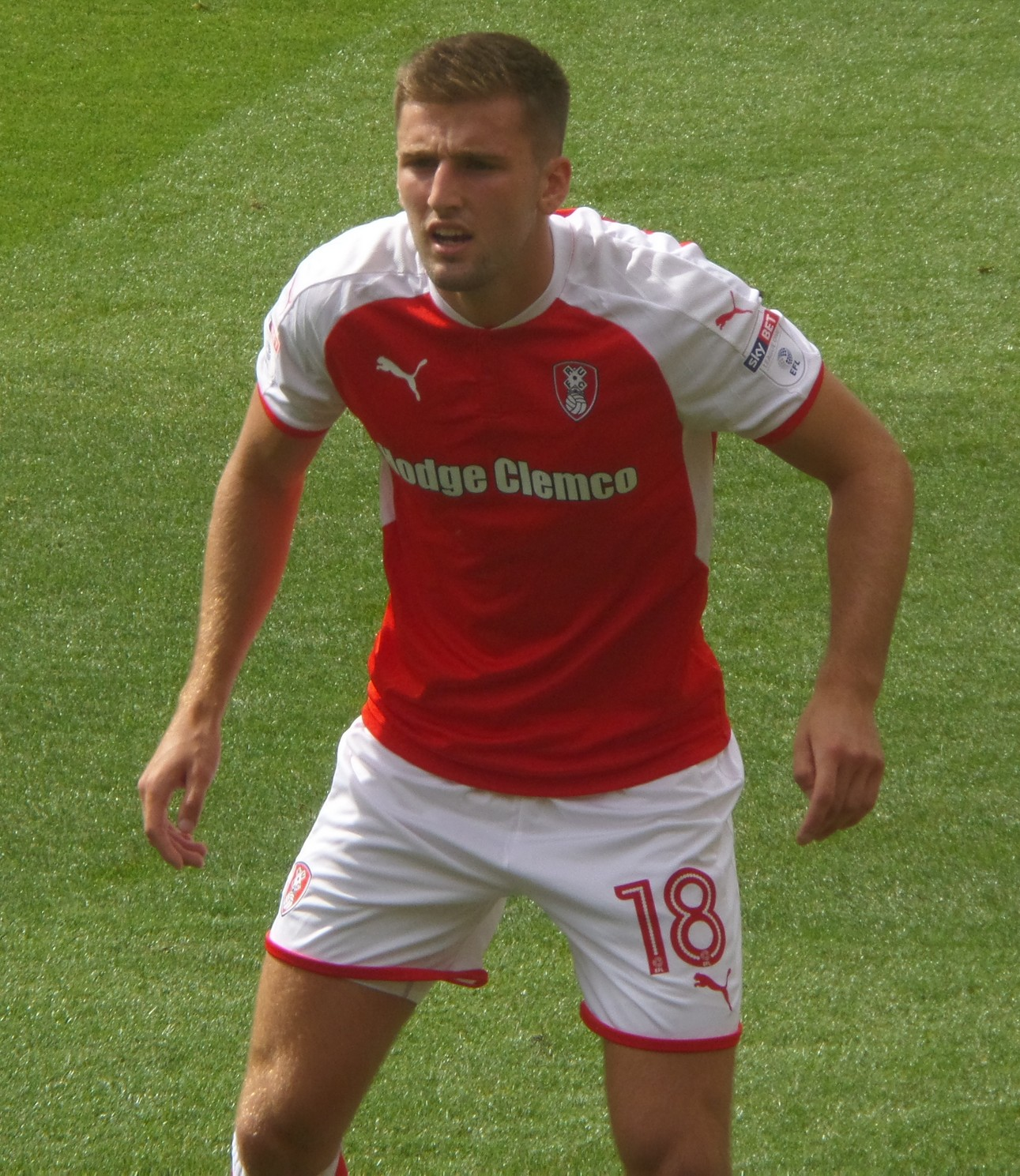
- Purrington playing for Rotherham United in 2017

Personal information
- Full name: Ben Purrington
- Date of birth: 20 May 1996 (age 30)
- Place of birth: Exeter, England
- Height: 5 ft 10 in (1.79 m)
- Positions: Left back; left wing-back; left midfielder; left winger

Team information
- Current team: Bristol Rovers
- Number: 14

Youth career
- 2005–2013: Plymouth Argyle

Senior career*
Years	Team	Apps	(Gls)
2013–2017	Plymouth Argyle	52	(0)
2017–2019	Rotherham United	20	(0)
2018–2019	→ AFC Wimbledon (loan)	26	(0)
2019	→ Charlton Athletic (loan)	18	(0)
2019–2022	Charlton Athletic	86	(7)
2022–2024	Ross County	23	(1)
2024–2025	Exeter City	33	(1)
2025–2026	Cambridge United	34	(0)
2026–	Bristol Rovers	5	(1)
- * Club domestic league appearances and goals as of 17:10, 12 September 2026 (UTC)

Ben Purrington (born 20 May 1996) is an English professional footballer who plays as a left back, left wing-back, left midfielder or left winger for EFL League Two club Bristol Rovers.

== Career ==
=== Plymouth Argyle ===
Purrington was born in Exeter, Devon. He joined the Plymouth Argyle youth academy in September 2005 when he was nine. He signed his first professional contract in May 2013. Seven months later, Purrington made his first-team debut in a League Two match against Oxford United, and scored his first senior goal in his fourth match; an FA Cup tie with Port Vale.

He soon became a regular in the side after an injury suffered to teammate Gary Sawyer at the beginning of the 2016–17 season.

=== Rotherham United ===
On 30 January 2017, Purrington completed a move to Championship side Rotherham United for a reported £300,000 fee, signing a three-and-a-half-year contract. He made his debut in a 1–0 away defeat to Bristol City on 4 February 2017.

==== Loans to AFC Wimbledon and Charlton Athletic ====
Purrington joined League One club AFC Wimbledon on 1 August 2018 on loan for the 2018–19 season. He scored his first goal for Wimbledon in an FA Cup tie against FC Halifax Town on 1 December 2018. He was recalled to Rotherham United on 10 January 2019.

On the same day as his recall, Purrington joined League One club Charlton Athletic on loan until the end of the season.

=== Charlton Athletic ===
On 2 July 2019, Purrington joined Charlton Athletic on a three-year contract.

On 13 June 2022, it was confirmed that Purrington would be leaving Charlton Athletic following the expiration of his contract.

=== Ross County ===
On 29 June 2022, Purrington signed a two-year deal at Ross County.

=== Exeter City ===
On 11 January 2024, Purrington signed an 18-month contract at Exeter City.

On 5 May 2025, Exeter announced the player would leave the club in June when his contract expired.

=== Cambridge United ===
On 23 June 2025, Purrington agreed to join League Two side Cambridge United on a one-year deal upon the expiration of his contract with Exeter City. On 6 May 2026 the club announced he was being released.

=== Bristol Rovers ===
On 11 June 2026, Purrington agreed to return to League Two following promotion the previous season, joining Bristol Rovers on a one-year deal.

== Personal life ==
Purrington's uncle is former England rugby union player Richard Hill. Purrington is the older brother of Tom Purrington, who also plays football semi-professionally as a midfielder for Taunton Town.

== Career statistics ==
As of match played 12 September 2026

Appearances and goals by club, season and competition
Club	Season	League			National Cup		League Cup		Other		Total	
Club	Season	Division	Apps	Goals	Apps	Goals	Apps	Goals	Apps	Goals	Apps	Goals
Plymouth Argyle	2013–14	League Two	12	0	2	1	0	0	0	0	14	1
Plymouth Argyle	2014–15	League Two	8	0	1	0	0	0	0	0	9	0
Plymouth Argyle	2015–16	League Two	13	0	0	0	0	0	3 (Note: Two appearances in Football League Trophy, one in League Two play-offs)	0	16	0
Plymouth Argyle	2016–17	League Two	19	0	3	0	0	0	3 (Note: Three appearances in the EFL Trophy)	0	25	0
Plymouth Argyle	Total		52	0	6	1	0	0	6	0	64	1
Rotherham United	2016–17	Championship	10	0	—		—		—		10	0
Rotherham United	2017–18	League One	10	0	0	0	1	0	1 (Note: One appearance in the EFL Trophy)	0	12	0
Rotherham United	2018–19	Championship	0	0	—		—		—		0	0
Rotherham United	Total		20	0	0	0	1	0	1	0	22	0
AFC Wimbledon (loan)	2018–19	League One	26	0	3	1	0	0	1 (Note: One appearance in the EFL Trophy)	0	30	1
Charlton Athletic (loan)	2018–19	League One	18	0	—		—		3 (Note: Three appearances in the League One play-offs)	1	21	1
Charlton Athletic	2019–20	Championship	31	2	0	0	0	0	—		31	2
Charlton Athletic	2020–21	League One	28	2	1	0	2	0	1 (Note: One appearance in the EFL Trophy)	0	32	2
Charlton Athletic	2021–22	League One	27	3	2	0	0	0	2 (Note: Two appearances in the EFL Trophy)	1	31	4
Charlton Athletic	Total		104	7	3	0	2	0	6	2	115	9
Ross County	2022–23	Scottish Premiership	11	0	0	0	5	1	2 (Note: Two appearances in the Scottish Premiership play-offs)	0	18	1
Ross County	2023–24	Scottish Premiership	12	1	0	0	2	0	—		14	1
Ross County	Total		23	1	0	0	7	1	2	0	32	2
Exeter City	2023–24	League One	12	1	—		—		—		12	1
Exeter City	2024–25	League One	21	0	1	0	1	0	4 (Note: Three appearances in the EFL Trophy)	0	27	0
Exeter City	Total		33	1	1	0	1	0	4	0	39	1
Cambridge United	2025–26	League Two	34	0	3	0	0	0	1	0	38	0
Bristol Rovers	2026–27	League Two	5	1	0	0	1	0	0	0	6	1
Career total			292	10	16	2	12	1	20	2	340	15

== Honours ==
Rotherham United

- EFL League One play-offs: 2018

Charlton Athletic

- EFL League One play-offs: 2019

Cambridge United

- EFL League Two third-place promotion: 2025–26
