= 2024–25 Cambridge United F.C. season =

Cambridge United
2024–25 season
- Owner: Paul Barry (70%), Mark Green (20%), Adam Webb (10%)
- Chairman: Shaun Grady
- Head Coach: Garry Monk (until 16 February); Neil Harris (from 19 February)
- Stadium: Abbey Stadium
- League One: 23rd (relegated)
- FA Cup: Second Round (eliminated by Wigan Athletic)
- EFL Cup: First round (eliminated by Queens Park Rangers)
- EFL Trophy: Second Round (eliminated by Cheltenham Town)
- Top goalscorer: League: Josh Stokes; Elias Kachunga (7); All: Josh Stokes (8)
- Highest home attendance: 7,414 (vs Leyton Orient, 21 April 2025, EFL League One)
- Lowest home attendance: 1,028 (vs Charlton Athletic, 17 September 2024, EFL Trophy)
- Average home league attendance: 6,640
- Biggest win: 4–1 vs Shrewsbury Town (H) (7 December 2024); EFL League One
- Biggest defeat: 6-1 vs Peterborough United (A) (9 November 2024); EFL League One

The 2024–25 season is the 113th season in the history of Cambridge United Football Club, and their fourth consecutive season in League One. In addition to the domestic league, the club will also participate in the FA Cup, the EFL Cup and the EFL Trophy.

== Transfers ==
=== In ===
Date	Pos	Player	From	Fee	Ref
1 July 2024 (Note: The transfer was announced on 25 June, and would become official on July 1 once his Bristol Rovers contract expired)	RB	James Gibbons (ENG)	Bristol Rovers	Free	
1 July 2024	CF	Shayne Lavery (NIR)	Blackpool	Free	
1 July 2024 (Note: The transfer was announced on 12 June, and would become official on July 1 once his Newcastle United contract expired)	CB	Kelland Watts (ENG)	Newcastle United	Free	
10 July 2024	CF	Ryan Loft (ENG)	Port Vale	Undisclosed	
15 July 2024	CM	Gary Gardner (ENG)	Birmingham City	Free	
17 July 2024	CM	Korey Smith (ENG)	Derby County	Free	
14 January 2025	GK	Marko Maroši (SVK)	Plymouth Argyle	Free	
30 January 2025	CM	Ben Stevenson (ENG)	Portsmouth	Free	
4 March 2025	LB	Scott Malone (ENG)	Crawley Town	Free	

=== Out ===
Date	Pos.	Player	To	Fee	Ref.
27 June 2024	RW	Jack Lankester (ENG)	Crewe Alexandra	Undisclosed	
27 June 2024	CM	Lewis Simper (ENG)	Sutton United	Undisclosed	
3 July 2024	CM	Adam May (ENG)	Forest Green Rovers	Free	

=== Loaned in ===
Date	Pos.	Player	From	Date until	Ref.
2 July 2024	GK	Vicente Reyes (CHI)	Norwich City	8 January 2025 (Note: On 8 January, Reyes was recalled to Norwich.)	
13 July 2024	CM	Taylor Richards (ENG)	Queens Park Rangers	End of season	
12 August 2024	CB	Connor O'Riordan (IRL)	Blackburn Rovers	9 January 2025 (Note: On 9 January, O'Riordan was recalled to Blackburn.)	
21 August 2024	AM	Josh Stokes (ENG)	Bristol City	End of season	
22 August 2024	LB	Emmanuel Longelo (ENG)	Birmingham City	End of season	
30 August 2024	CF	Dan Nlundulu (ENG)	Bolton Wanderers	End of season	
27 January 2025	CF	Esapa Osong (ENG)	Nottingham Forest	End of season	
27 January 2025	CF	Dom Ballard (ENG)	Southampton	End of season	
3 February 2025	GK	Nathan Bishop (ENG)	Sunderland	End of season	

=== Loaned out ===
Date	Pos	Player	To	Date until	Ref
23 November 2024	AM	Glenn McConnell (IRL)	Chelmsford City	21 December 2024	
3 January 2025	AM	Amaru Kaunda (ENG)	Enfield Town	31 January 2025	
3 February 2025	AM	Amaru Kaunda (ENG)	Dulwich Hamlet	3 March 2025	

=== Released / Out of Contract ===
Date	Pos.	Player	Subsequent club	Join date	Ref.
30 June 2024	CB	Harvey Beckett (ENG)	Royston Town	1 July 2024	
30 June 2024	GK	Will Mannion (ENG)	Charlton Athletic	1 July 2024	
30 June 2024	CF	Lyle Taylor (MSR)	Colchester United	2 July 2024	
30 June 2024	GK	Tom Finch (ENG)	Norwich City	3 July 2024	
30 June 2024	RB	Greg Sandiford (ENG)	Coventry City	3 July 2024	
30 June 2024	AM	Kai Yearn (ENG)	Coventry City	3 July 2024	
30 June 2024	LB	Brandon Haunstrup (ENG)	Gateshead	13 August 2024	
30 June 2024	CF	Fejiri Okenabirhie (NGA)	Modern Sport (EGY)	6 September 2024	
30 June 2024	CF	Saleem Akanbi (ENG)	Hemel Hempstead Town	5 October 2024	
30 June 2024	CB	Ryan Bennett (ENG)	Retired		
30 June 2024	LB	Harrison Dunk (ENG)	Retired		
30 June 2024	GK	James Holden (ENG)			
30 June 2024	CF	Saikou Janneh (GAM)			

== Pre-season and friendlies ==
On 24 May, Cambridge confirmed their initial pre-season plans, with matches against West Bromwich Albion, Braintree Town, Ebbsfleet United along with a training camp in Portugal. A week later, a fourth friendly was added to the pre-season schedule, versus Colchester United.

Win Draw Loss Fixtures

17 July 2024 Friendly	Marítimo	2–0	Cambridge United	Parchal, Portugal
19:00 WEST	André Rodrigues; Martim Tavares	Report		Stadium: Estádio Municipal Bela Vista

20 July 2024 Friendly	Bromley	2–2	Cambridge United	Parchal, Portugal
11:00 WEST		Report	Munday; Lavery	Stadium: Estádio Municipal Bela Vista

26 July 2024 Friendly	Braintree Town	0–3	Cambridge United	Braintree
19:45 BST		Report	Kaunda 62', 64'; Andrew 87'	Stadium: Cressing Road

27 July 2024 Friendly	Ebbsfleet United	1–3	Cambridge United	Northfleet
15:00 BST	Samuel 13'	Report	Cousins 44' (o.g.); Kaikai 63' , 73'	Stadium: Stonebridge Road

2 August 2024 Friendly	Cambridge United	1–0	West Bromwich Albion	Cambridge
19:45 BST	Lavery 11' (pen.)	Report		Stadium: Abbey Stadium; Attendance: 3,203; Referee: Neil Hair

3 August 2024 Friendly	Colchester United	6–0	Cambridge United	St Neots
15:00 BST	Ihionvien (x2); Iandolo; Payne; Hopper; Tovide	Report		Stadium: Rowley Park

== Competitions ==
=== Overall record ===
Competition	First match	Last match	Starting round	Final position	Record							
Competition	First match	Last match	Starting round	Final position	Pld	W	D	L	GF	GA	GD	Win %
League One	10 August 2024	3 May 2025	Matchday 1	23rd	46	9	11	26	45	73	−28	19.57
FA Cup	2 November 2024	30 November 2024	First round	Second round	2	1	0	1	2	2	+0	50.00
EFL Cup	13 August 2024	13 August 2024	First round	First round	1	0	0	1	1	2	−1	0.00
EFL Trophy	3 September 2024	10 December 2024	Group stage	Second round	4	1	1	2	6	7	−1	25.00
Total					53	11	12	30	54	84	−30	20.75

Last updated: 3 May 2025
Source: Soccerway

=== League One ===
==== League table ====
Pos	Team	Pld	W	D	L	GF	GA	GD	Pts	Promotion, qualification or relegation
20	Burton Albion	46	11	14	21	49	66	−17	47	
21	Crawley Town (R)	46	12	10	24	57	83	−26	46	Relegation to EFL League Two
22	Bristol Rovers (R)	46	12	7	27	44	76	−32	43	Relegation to EFL League Two
23	Cambridge United (R)	46	9	11	26	45	73	−28	38	Relegation to EFL League Two
24	Shrewsbury Town (R)	46	8	9	29	41	79	−38	33	Relegation to EFL League Two

Source: EFL Official Website
Rules for classification: 1) Points; 2) Goal difference; 3) Number of goals scored; 4) Head-to-head results; 5) Wins; 6) Away goals; 7) Penalty points (sec 9.5); 8) 12-point sending off offences
(R) Relegated

==== Results summary ====
Overall								Home						Away					
Pld	W	D	L	GF	GA	GD	Pts	W	D	L	GF	GA	GD	W	D	L	GF	GA	GD
46	9	11	26	45	73	−28	38	5	6	12	25	33	−8	4	5	14	20	40	−20

Last updated: 3 May 2025.
Source: Soccerway

==== Results by round ====
Round	1	2	3	4	6	7	8	9	10	12	13	14	15	16	17	5^{1}	18	19	20	21	22	23	24	25	27	28	29	30	31	11^{2}	32	33	34	35	36	26^{3}	37	38	39	40	41	42	43	44	45	46
Ground	A	H	H	A	A	A	H	H	A	H	A	H	A	H	A	H	A	H	A	H	A	A	H	H	A	H	A	H	A	A	H	H	A	H	A	A	H	A	H	H	A	H	A	H	A	H
Result	L	L	D	L	L	L	L	L	L	W	W	W	L	D	D	D	L	W	D	L	L	L	L	L	D	W	L	D	D	L	L	W	W	L	L	L	L	D	D	D	W	L	W	L	L	L
Position	23	21	20	23	24	24	24	24	24	23	23	21	22	22	22	22	22	22	22	22	22	22	23	23	23	22	23	24	24	24	24	24	22	22	23	23	23	23	23	23	23	23	22	23	23	23
Points	0	0	1	1	1	1	1	1	1	4	7	10	10	11	12	13	13	16	17	17	17	17	17	17	18	21	21	22	23	23	23	26	29	29	29	29	29	30	31	32	35	35	38	38	38	38

Source: EFL
A = Away; H = Home; W = Win; D = Draw; L = Loss; P = Postponed
Notes:
- ^{1} Matchday 5 (vs. Bolton Wanderers) was postponed due to international call-ups.
- ^{2} Matchday 11 (vs. Birmingham City) was postponed due to international call-ups.
- ^{3} Matchday 26 (vs. Blackpool) was postponed due to a frozen pitch.

==== Matches ====
On 26 June, the League One fixtures were announced.

Win Draw Loss Fixtures

10 August 2024 1	Stockport County	2–0	Cambridge United	Stockport
17:30 BST	Barry 5'; Pye (yellow card) 25'; Touray (yellow card) 49'; Camps (yellow card) 67'; Horsfall (yellow card) 70'; Wootton 76'	Report	Kaikai (yellow card) 39'; Rossi (yellow card) 58'	Stadium: Edgeley Park; Attendance: 9,457; Referee: Seb Stockbridge

17 August 2024 2	Cambridge United	0–1	Crawley Town	Cambridge
15:00 BST	Andrew (yellow card) 9'; Kaikai (yellow card) 49'; Lavery (yellow card) 53'; Gibbons (yellow card) 83'	Report	Williams (yellow card) 14'; Anderson (yellow card) 45+1'; Mullarkey (yellow card) 50'; Quitirna (yellow card) 60'; Adeyemo 86'	Stadium: Abbey Stadium; Attendance: 6,720; Referee: David Rock

24 August 2024 3	Cambridge United	4–4	Blackpool	Cambridge
15:00 BST	Brophy (yellow card) 19'; Lavery 28', 75'; Bennett (yellow card) 45+2'; Andrew 59'; Njoku 72'	Report	Husband 5', 38'; Joseph 39'; Ballard 53'; Baggott (yellow card) 58'; Norburn (yellow card) 76'; Coulson (yellow card) 80'; Casey (yellow card) 84'	Stadium: Abbey Stadium; Attendance: 7,083; Referee: Jacob Miles

31 August 2024 4	Bristol Rovers	2–0	Cambridge United	Horfield
15:00 BST	Moore (yellow card) 29'; Omochere 30', 48'	Report	Andrew (yellow card) 55'	Stadium: Memorial Stadium; Attendance: 7,893; Referee: Craig Hicks

14 September 2024 6	Mansfield Town	2–1	Cambridge United	Mansfield
12:30 BST	Gregory 39', 68', (yellow card) 44'	Report	Smith (yellow card) 45'; Longelo 50'; Rossi (yellow card) 70'; Digby (yellow card) 89'	Stadium: Field Mill; Attendance: 7,294; Referee: Martin Coy
Note: Fixture was initially scheduled for a 15:00 kick-off, but was moved for live Sky Sports broadcast.

21 September 2024 7	Wycombe Wanderers	2–1	Cambridge United	High Wycombe
15:00 BST	McCleary 8'; Humphreys 85'; Scowen (yellow card) 88'	Report	Kaikai (yellow card) 7'; Nlundulu 19'; Ibsen Rossi (yellow card) 78'	Stadium: Adams Park; Attendance: 4,189; Referee: Scott Oldham

28 September 2024 8	Cambridge United	0–2	Lincoln City	Cambridge
15:00 BST	Nlundulu (yellow card) 38'	Report	Draper 26'; Makama (yellow card) 37'; Cadamarteri 68' (yellow card) 71'; Jackson (yellow card) 87'	Stadium: Abbey Stadium; Attendance: 6,969; Referee: Adam Herczeg

1 October 2024 9	Cambridge United	0–1	Rotherham United	Cambridge
19:45 BST	Digby (yellow card) 32'; Brophy (yellow card) 64'; Nlundulu (yellow card) 76'; Loft (yellow card) 90+4'	Report	Nombe 90+2'; Hugill (yellow card) 90+4'	Stadium: Abbey Stadium; Attendance: 5,085; Referee: Darren Drysdale

5 October 2024 10	Exeter City	1–0	Cambridge United	Exeter
15:00 BST	Woods 23' (yellow card) 74'; Yfeko (yellow card) 45+2'	Report	Loft (yellow card) 19'; Andrew (yellow card) 79'	Stadium: St James Park; Attendance: 6,406; Referee: Scott Tallis

19 October 2024 12	Cambridge United	2–0	Wigan Athletic	Cambridge
15:00 BST	Kachunga 5' (yellow card) 74'; Tickle 22' (o.g.); Andrew (yellow card) 47'; Bennett (yellow card) 61'; Reyes (yellow card) 85'; Smith (yellow card) 86'	Report	Smith (yellow card) 73'; Miller (yellow card) 83'	Stadium: Abbey Stadium; Attendance: 7,000; Referee: Ruebyn Ricardo

22 October 2024 13	Stevenage	0–2	Cambridge United	Stevenage
19:45 BST	Piergianni (yellow card) 26'; Thompson (yellow card) 40'	Report	Digby (yellow card) 26'; Smith 31' (yellow card) 45+4'; Kaikai 90'	Stadium: Broadhall Way; Attendance: 4,574; Referee: Ben Atkinson

26 October 2024 14	Cambridge United	1–0	Burton Albion	Cambridge
15:00 BST	Bennett (yellow card) 39'; Cousins 84'; Andrew (yellow card) 90+3'	Report	Bennett (yellow card) 5'; Watt (yellow card) 23'; Bodin (yellow card) 34'	Stadium: Abbey Stadium; Attendance: 6,706; Referee: Declan Bourne

9 November 2024 15	Peterborough United	6–1	Cambridge United	Peterborough
15:00 GMT	Jones 25', (yellow card) 30'; Poku 32', 39', 90'; Mothersille 44' (pen.); de Havilland 50'; Dornelly (yellow card) 61'	Report	Kaikai 84'	Stadium: London Road Stadium; Attendance: 12,370; Referee: Edward Duckworth

16 November 2024 16	Cambridge United	1–1	Barnsley	Cambridge
15:00 GMT	Nlundulu 4'; Njoku (yellow card) 49'; Bennett (yellow card) 71'; Loft (yellow card) 75'	Report	Humphrys (yellow card) 16' (goal) 17'; Gent (yellow card) 17'; Russell (yellow card) 51'	Stadium: Abbey Stadium; Attendance: 6,817; Referee: Seb Stockbridge

23 November 2024 17	Northampton Town	0–0	Cambridge United	Sixfields
15:00 GMT		Report	Lavery (yellow card) 75'	Stadium: Sixfields Stadium; Attendance: 6,654; Referee: Alan Young

26 November 2024 5	Cambridge United	1–1	Bolton Wanderers	Cambridge
19:45 GMT	Njoku (yellow card) 44'; Okedina (red card) 49'; Smith (yellow card) 59'; Kaikai 89'	Report	Thomason (yellow card) 17'; Sheehan (yellow card) 54'; Collins 59'; Osei-Tutu (yellow card) 77'; Baxter (yellow card) 88'; Jones (yellow card) 90+4'	Stadium: Abbey Stadium; Attendance: 5,266; Referee: Paul Howard
Note: Fixture was originally scheduled for 7 September, but was postponed due to international call-ups from both teams.

3 December 2024 18	Reading	3–0	Cambridge United	Reading
20:00 GMT	Camará (yellow card) 9' (goal) 60'; Wing 49', 63'; Elliott (yellow card) 56'	Report	Cousins (yellow card) 54'	Stadium: Madejski Stadium; Attendance: 8,333; Referee: Sam Allison

7 December 2024 19	Cambridge United	4–1	Shrewsbury Town	Cambridge
15:00 GMT	Lavery 1', 30'; Nlundulu 46'; Kachunga 53'; Reyes (yellow card) 70'; Loft (yellow card) 80'	Report	Marquis 70' (pen.); Shipley (yellow card) 70'	Stadium: Abbey Stadium; Attendance: 6,167; Referee: Alex Chilowicz

14 December 2024 20	Wrexham	2–2	Cambridge United	Wrexham
15:00 GMT	Lee (yellow card) 2'; McClean 27' (yellow card) 41'; Fletcher 66'; Brunt (yellow card) 88'	Report	Kachunga 20' (yellow card) 44'; Nlundulu 89' (pen.); Smith (yellow card) 90+1'	Stadium: Racecourse Ground; Attendance: 11,698; Referee: Scott Oldham

20 December 2024 21	Cambridge United	0–4	Huddersfield Town	Cambridge
19:45 GMT	Brophy (yellow card) 40'	Report	Kasumu 12' (yellow card) 16'; Spencer 32'; Marshall 38', 72'; Turton (yellow card) 47'	Stadium: Abbey Stadium; Attendance: 6,949; Referee: Andrew Kitchen
Note: Fixture was initially scheduled for 21 December, but was moved following agreement between the two sides.

26 December 2024 22	Charlton Athletic	2–1	Cambridge United	Charlton
15:00 GMT	Campbell 1'; Leaburn 20'	Report	Kachunga 51'; Morrison (yellow card) 73'	Stadium: The Valley; Attendance: 14,369; Referee: David Rock

29 December 2024 23	Leyton Orient	2–0	Cambridge United	Leyton
15:00 GMT	O'Neill 32'; Brown (yellow card) 46'; Donley 70'; Keeley (yellow card) 90+2'	Report	Kachunga (yellow card) 32'; Andrew (yellow card) 75'	Stadium: Brisbane Road; Attendance: 8,914; Referee: James Oldham

1 January 2025 24	Cambridge United	1–3	Reading	Cambridge
15:00 GMT	Kachunga 48'; Brophy (yellow card) 71'	Report	Knibbs 40', 53'; Holzman (yellow card) 81'; Smith; Wing (yellow card) 90+3'	Stadium: Abbey Stadium; Attendance: 6,878; Referee: Jacob Miles

4 January 2025 25	Cambridge United	0–1	Bristol Rovers	Cambridge
12:30 GMT	Smith (yellow card) 45+6'; Morrison (yellow card) 45+9' (yellow-red card) 90+4'; Stokes (yellow card) 90+7'	Report	Ward (yellow card) 8'; Thomas 26'; Sotiriou (yellow card) 45+9'; Wilson (yellow card) 90+4'; Hutchinson (yellow card) 90+7'	Stadium: Abbey Stadium; Attendance: 6,467; Referee: Sam Mulhall
Note: Fixture was initially scheduled for a 15:00 kick-off, but was moved for live Sky Sports broadcast.

18 January 2025 27	Bolton Wanderers	2–2	Cambridge United	Horwich
15:00 GMT	McAtee 34' (yellow card) 43'; Collins (yellow card) 35'; Sheehan (yellow card) 77'; Ibsen Rossi 90' (o.g.)	Report	Stokes 4'; Kachunga 36' (yellow card) 40'; Andrew (yellow card) 68'	Stadium: Toughsheet Community Stadium; Attendance: 19,946; Referee: Tom Nield

25 January 2025 28	Cambridge United	3–2	Mansfield Town	Cambridge
12:30 GMT	Morrison 1'; Stokes 7' (pen.); Loft 47'; Digby (yellow card) 72'; Stevens (yellow card) 90+1'	Report	Hewitt (yellow card) 45+2'; Maris 61'; Gregory 90+1' (pen.); Blake-Tracy (yellow card) 90+2'	Stadium: Abbey Stadium; Attendance: 6,687; Referee: Thomas Parsons
Note: Fixture was initially scheduled for a 15:00 kick-off, but was moved for live Sky Sports broadcasting.

28 January 2025 29	Rotherham United	2–1	Cambridge United	Rotherham
19:45 GMT	Wilks 53'; Sibley (yellow card) 59'; Odoffin 70'	Report	Kachunga (yellow card) 4'; Loft 49'; Gibbons (yellow card) 83'	Stadium: New York Stadium; Attendance: 8,162; Referee: Ross Joyce

1 February 2025 30	Cambridge United	1–1	Wycombe Wanderers	Cambridge
15:00 GMT	Digby (yellow card) 1'; Bennett (yellow card) 39'; Stokes 83'; Kachunga (yellow card) 83'	Report	Humphreys 35'; Bradley (red card) 64'	Stadium: Abbey Stadium; Attendance: 6,866; Referee: Martin Woods

8 February 2025 31	Lincoln City	1–1	Cambridge United	Lincoln
15:00 GMT	Draper 17'; Roughan (yellow card) 35'; McGrandles (yellow card) 82'; Jackson (yellow card) 84'; Gardner (red card) 86'; House (yellow card) 87'	Report	Gibbons 42'; Okedina (yellow card) 90+3'	Stadium: Sincil Bank; Attendance: 8,606; Referee: Steven Copeland

11 February 2025 11	Birmingham City	4–0	Cambridge United	Bordesley
19:45 GMT	Stansfield 23'; Bennett 39' (o.g.); Dowell 40'; Harris 80'; Laird (yellow card) 90+4'	Report	Bishop (yellow card) 57'; Gibbons (yellow card) 84'; Njoku (yellow card) 90'	Stadium: St Andrew's; Referee: Darren Drysdale
Note: Fixture was originally scheduled for 12 October, but was postponed due to international call-ups.

15 February 2025 32	Cambridge United	0–1	Exeter City	Cambridge
12:30 GMT	Morrison (yellow card) 90+7'	Report	Harper (yellow card) 41'; A. MacDonald (yellow card) 44'; Watts (yellow card) 54'; Magennis 73'; Whitworth (yellow card) 90+4'	Stadium: Abbey Stadium; Attendance: 5,455; Referee: Carl Brook
Note: Fixture was initially scheduled for a 15:00 kick-off, but was moved for live Sky Sports broadcasting.

22 February 2025 33	Cambridge United	2-0	Stockport County	Cambridge
15:00 GMT	Stokes 9', 43'; Digby (yellow card) 84'	Report	Connolly (yellow card) 49' (yellow-red card) 90+3'	Stadium: Abbey Stadium; Attendance: 6,905; Referee: Scott Oldham

1 March 2025 34	Crawley Town	0–2	Cambridge United	Crawley
15:00 GMT	Quitirna (yellow card) 47'; Hepburn-Murphy (red card) 60'; Barker (yellow card) 90+7'	Report	Digby (yellow card) 9' (goal) 64'; Doyle 33' (o.g.); Loft (yellow card) 46'; Gibbons (red card) 66'; Bishop (yellow card) 90+3'	Stadium: Broadfield Stadium; Referee: James Oldham

4 March 2025 35	Cambridge United	0–1	Stevenage	Cambridge
19:45 GMT	Loft (yellow card) 41'; Stevenson (yellow card) 89'	Report	Sweeney (yellow card) 8'; Reid 64'; Phillips (yellow card) 83'	Stadium: Abbey Stadium; Attendance: 6,338; Referee: Scott Jackson

8 March 2025 36	Wigan Athletic	1–0	Cambridge United	Wigan
15:00 GMT	Norburn (yellow card) 29'; Carragher (yellow card) 37'; Robinson 77'	Report	Watts (yellow card) 45'; Okedina (yellow card) 90'; Morrison (yellow card) 90+2'	Stadium: Brick Community Stadium; Attendance: 10,052; Referee: Matthew Corlett

11 March 2025 26	Blackpool	2–1	Cambridge United	Blackpool
19:45 GMT	Fletcher 17'; Carey 54'; Beesley (yellow card) 71'	Report	Ballard 3'; Stokes (yellow card) 84'	Stadium: Bloomfield Road; Referee: Scott Tallis
Note: Fixture was originally scheduled for 11 January, but was postponed due to a frozen pitch.

15 March 2025 37	Cambridge United	0–1	Peterborough United	Cambridge
12:30 GMT	Gibbons (yellow card) 35'; Watts (yellow card) 71'	Report	Odoh (yellow card) 35'; Ihionvien (yellow card) 54'; Edun (yellow card) 62' (yellow-red card) 90+5' (goal) 62'; Hughes (yellow card) 85'	Stadium: Abbey Stadium; Attendance: 7,359; Referee: Edward Duckworth
Note: Fixture was initially scheduled for a 15:00 kick-off, but was moved following consultation with Cambridgeshire Constabulary.

22 March 2025 38	Barnsley	1–1	Cambridge United	Barnsley
15:00 GMT	de Gevigney (yellow card) 55'; Lewis 90+2'; Nwakali (yellow card) 90+4'; Russell (yellow card) 90+5'	Report	Brophy 9'; Malone (yellow card) 45+1'; Stevenson (yellow card) 49'; Gibbons (yellow card) 77'; Morrison (yellow card) 90+5'	Stadium: Oakwell; Attendance: 10,790; Referee: Richard Eley

29 March 2025 39	Cambridge United	1–1	Northampton Town	Cambridge
15:00 GMT	Brophy 52'; Stevenson (yellow card) 72'; Stokes (yellow card) 74'	Report	Hoskins 26'	Stadium: Abbey Stadium; Attendance: 7,252; Referee: Matthew Russell

1 April 2025 40	Cambridge United	2–2	Wrexham	Cambridge
19:45 BST	Bennett (yellow card) 24' (goal) 40'; Loft (yellow card) 39'; Stokes 47' (pen.)	Report	Dobson 4'; Cleworth (yellow card) 7'; Smith 57' (yellow card) 89'	Stadium: Abbey Stadium; Attendance: 6,871; Referee: Thomas Parsons

5 April 2025 41	Shrewsbury Town	0–1	Cambridge United	Shrewsbury
15:00 BST	Ojo (yellow card) 72'	Report	Ballard 76'; Stevenson (yellow card) 82'	Stadium: New Meadow; Attendance: 5,952; Referee: Ollie Yates

12 April 2025 42	Cambridge United	0–1	Charlton Athletic	Cambridge
15:00 BST	Loft (yellow card) 59'	Report	Campbell 14' (yellow card) 19'; Coventry (yellow card) 42'; Berry (yellow card) 56'; Small (yellow card) 74'; Docherty (yellow card) 88'	Stadium: Abbey Stadium; Attendance: 6,707; Referee: James Durkin

18 April 2025 43	Huddersfield Town	1–2	Cambridge United	Huddersfield
15:00 BST	Koroma 89'; Evans (yellow card) 90+4'	Report	Morrison (yellow card) 23'; Digby (yellow card) 54'; Brophy 69'; Stevens (yellow card) 73'; Gibbons (yellow card) 76'; Kaikai 90+2'	Stadium: Kirklees Stadium; Referee: Sam Allison

21 April 2025 44	Cambridge United	1–2	Leyton Orient	Cambridge
15:00 BST	Stokes 19'; Brophy (yellow card) 70'; Loft (yellow card) 83'	Report	Kelman 67'; Abdulai (yellow card) 70'; Donley 78'	Stadium: Abbey Stadium; Attendance: 7,414; Referee: Anthony Backhouse

26 April 2025 45	Burton Albion	2–1	Cambridge United	Burton upon Trent
15:00 BST	McKiernan (yellow card) 27' (yellow-red card) 45+4'; Böðvarsson 48'; Williams 90+3'	Report	Kaikai (yellow card) 33'; Loft (red card) 45+3'; Kachunga 84'	Stadium: Pirelli Stadium; Attendance: 3,540; Referee: Will Finnie

3 May 2025 46	Cambridge United	1–2	Birmingham City	Cambridge
15:00 BST	Kachunga (yellow card) 34' (yellow-red card) 68'; Lavery 36'; Watts (yellow card) 77'; Stokes (yellow card) 88'		Klarer 25'; Gardner-Hickman (yellow card) 75'; Watts 82' (o.g.)	Stadium: Abbey Stadium; Attendance: 6,764; Referee: Charles Breakspear

=== FA Cup ===
Cambridge United were drawn away to Woking in the first round and at home to Wigan Athletic in the second round.

Win Draw Loss Fixtures

2 November 2024 First round	Woking	0–1	Cambridge United	Woking
15:00 GMT	Moss (yellow card) 16'; Lewis (yellow card) 22'; Conte (yellow card) 41'; Kelly-Evans (yellow card) 66'		Kachunga (yellow card) 42'; Brophy 73'; Andrew (yellow card) 90+4'	Stadium: Kingfield Stadium; Attendance: 3,105; Referee: Jamie O'Connor

30 November 2024 Second round	Cambridge United	1–2 (a.e.t.)	Wigan Athletic	Cambridge
15:00 GMT	Loft (yellow card) 21'; Nlundulu (yellow card) 27'; Njoku 77'; Lavery (yellow card) 81'	Report	Aasgaard 85'; Asamoah (yellow card) 90'; Smith 119'	Stadium: Abbey Stadium; Attendance: 3,830; Referee: Zac Kennard-Kettle

=== EFL Cup ===
On 27 June, the draw for the first round was made, with Cambridge being drawn at home against Queens Park Rangers.

Win Draw Loss Fixtures

13 August 2024 First round	Cambridge United	1–2	Queens Park Rangers	Cambridge
19:45 BST	Brophy (yellow card) 9'; Digby 57'; Kaikai (yellow card) 68'		Frey 13'; Smyth 36'; Andersen (yellow card) 45+1'; Bennie (yellow card) 81'	Stadium: Abbey Stadium; Attendance: 4,529; Referee: Paul Howard

=== EFL Trophy ===
In the group stage, Cambridge were drawn into Southern Group C alongside Bromley, Charlton Athletic and Chelsea U21. In the round of 32, Cambridge were drawn away to Cheltenham Town.

==== Group stage ====
Pos	Div	Team	Pld	W	PW	PL	L	GF	GA	GD	Pts	Qualification
1	L1	Charlton Athletic	3	3	0	0	0	6	1	+5	9	Advance to Round 2
2	L1	Cambridge United	3	1	0	1	1	5	5	0	4	Advance to Round 2
3	ACA	Chelsea U21	3	1	0	0	2	3	6	−3	3	
4	L2	Bromley	3	0	1	0	2	5	7	−2	2	

Source: EFL

Win Draw Loss Fixtures

3 September 2024 1	Bromley	3–3 (5–4 p)	Cambridge United	Bromley
19:45 BST	Dinanga 1', 23'; Sowunmi (yellow card) 78'; Olomola 90'	Report	Njoku (yellow card) 26'; Bennett 38'; Barton 60'; Longelo 68'	Stadium: Hayes Lane; Attendance: 1,120; Referee: James Durkin
	Penalties
	Arthurs (penalty scored); Charles (penalty scored); Topalloj (penalty scored); Odutayo (penalty scored); Olomola (penalty scored)		(penalty missed) Andrew; (penalty scored) Nlundulu; (penalty scored) Stokes; (penalty scored) Digby; (penalty scored) Okedina

17 September 2024 2	Cambridge United	1–2	Charlton Athletic	Cambridge
19:00 BST	Nlundulu 44' (pen.); O'Riordan (yellow card) 66'; Longelo (yellow card) 77'; Digby (yellow card) 80'	Report	Edun (yellow card) 16', (goal) 24'; Godden 30', (yellow card) 31'; Anderson (yellow card) 43' (yellow-red card) 84'	Stadium: Abbey Stadium; Attendance: 1,028; Referee: Carl Brook

5 November 2024 3	Cambridge United	1–0	Chelsea U21	Cambridge
19:00 GMT	Andrew (penalty missed) 48'; Kaunda 74'; Bennett (yellow card) 90+3'	Report	Dyer (yellow card) 51'	Stadium: Abbey Stadium; Attendance: 1,340; Referee: Sam Mulhall

==== Knockout stages ====
10 December 2024 Second Round	Cheltenham Town	2–1	Cambridge United	Cheltenham
19:45 GMT	Taylor 54'; Jude-Boyd 57'	Report	Stokes 45' (pen.); Watts (yellow card) 60'; Rossi (yellow card) 67'; O'Riordan (yellow card) 78'	Stadium: Whaddon Road; Attendance: 847; Referee: Dale Baines

== Statistics ==
=== Appearances and goals ===
As of match played 26 April 2025

Players with no appearances are not included on the list
Italics indicate a loaned in player

No.	Pos	Nat	Player	Total		League One		FA Cup		EFL Cup		EFL Trophy	
No.	Pos	Nat	Player	Apps	Goals	Apps	Goals	Apps	Goals	Apps	Goals	Apps	Goals
1	GK	(England) ENG	Jack Stevens	16	0	11+1	0	0+0	0	1+0	0	3+0	0
2	DF	(England) ENG	Liam Bennett	48	2	35+6	1	2+0	0	1+0	0	4+0	1
3	DF	(England) ENG	Danny Andrew	38	1	26+6	1	1+1	0	1+0	0	3+0	0
4	MF	(England) ENG	Paul Digby	36	2	27+4	1	1+0	0	1+0	1	1+2	0
5	DF	(England) ENG	Michael Morrison	46	1	40+1	1	1+1	0	1+0	0	1+1	0
6	DF	(England) ENG	Kelland Watts	33	0	26+3	0	1+1	0	0+0	0	2+0	0
7	MF	(England) ENG	James Brophy	53	4	43+3	3	2+0	1	1+0	0	2+2	0
9	FW	(England) ENG	Dan Nlundulu	30	5	17+8	4	2+0	0	0+0	0	1+2	1
10	FW	(Democratic Republic of the Congo) COD	Elias Kachunga	47	7	31+12	7	2+0	0	1+0	0	1+0	0
11	FW	(Sierra Leone) SLE	Sullay Kaikai	29	4	11+14	4	2+0	0	0+1	0	1+0	0
13	GK	(England) ENG	Nathan Bishop	14	0	13+1	0	0+0	0	0+0	0	0+0	0
14	MF	(England) ENG	Korey Smith	29	1	23+0	1	1+1	0	0+1	0	2+1	0
15	DF	(Malawi) MAW	Jubril Okedina	32	0	23+4	0	1+0	0	0+1	0	2+1	0
16	DF	(England) ENG	Zeno Ibsen Rossi	21	0	12+3	0	1+0	0	1+0	0	3+1	0
17	MF	(England) ENG	Taylor Richards	5	0	0+5	0	0+0	0	0+0	0	0+0	0
18	MF	(England) ENG	Ryan Loft	34	3	18+14	3	1+0	0	0+0	0	1+0	0
19	FW	(Northern Ireland) NIR	Shayne Lavery	17	5	10+5	5	0+1	0	0+1	0	0+0	0
21	FW	(England) ENG	Esapa Osong	2	0	0+2	0	0+0	0	0+0	0	0+0	0
22	MF	(England) ENG	Josh Stokes	34	8	26+6	7	0+0	0	0+0	0	2+0	1
24	MF	(Jamaica) JAM	Jordan Cousins	32	1	23+5	1	1+1	0	0+0	0	2+0	0
26	DF	(England) ENG	James Gibbons	30	1	23+6	1	1+0	0	0+0	0	0+0	0
27	GK	(Slovakia) SVK	Marko Maroši	2	0	2+0	0	0+0	0	0+0	0	0+0	0
28	MF	(England) ENG	Ben Stevenson	17	0	11+6	0	0+0	0	0+0	0	0+0	0
29	FW	(England) ENG	Dom Ballard	17	2	11+6	2	0+0	0	0+0	0	0+0	0
30	MF	(Republic of Ireland) IRL	Glenn McConnell	1	0	0+0	0	0+0	0	0+0	0	1+0	0
33	DF	(England) ENG	Scott Malone	8	0	6+2	0	0+0	0	0+0	0	0+0	0
34	FW	(England) ENG	Brandon Njoku	32	2	8+17	1	0+2	1	1+0	0	3+1	0
36	FW	(England) ENG	Daniel Barton	20	1	6+10	0	0+0	0	1+0	0	3+0	1
37	MF	(England) ENG	Amaru Kaunda	4	1	0+1	0	0+0	0	0+1	0	2+0	1
38	MF	(England) ENG	George Hoddle	2	0	0+2	0	0+0	0	0+0	0	0+0	0
39	MF	(England) ENG	Peter Holmes	1	0	0+0	0	0+0	0	0+0	0	0+1	0
41	FW	(England) ENG	Randy Bulakio	1	0	0+0	0	0+0	0	0+0	0	1+0	0
45	DF	(England) ENG	Emmanuel Longelo	19	2	3+12	1	0+1	0	0+0	0	3+0	1
Player(s) who featured whilst on loan but returned to parent club during the season:
27	GK	(Chile) CHI	Vicente Reyes	23	0	20+0	0	2+0	0	0+0	0	1+0	0
29	DF	(Republic of Ireland) IRL	Connor O'Riordan	8	0	3+1	0	0+0	0	1+0	0	3+0	0
