= Harvey Bunker =

English footballer

Personal information
- Full name: Harvey James Bunker
- Date of birth: 15 April 2003 (age 23)
- Place of birth: Portsmouth, England
- Height: 1.93 m (6 ft 4 in)
- Position: Midfielder

Team information
- Current team: Carlisle United
- Number: 4

Youth career
- Southampton
- –2019: Forest Green Rovers

Senior career*
Years	Team	Apps	(Gls)
2019–2026	Forest Green Rovers	124	(10)
2021	→ Chippenham Town (loan)	12	(2)
2022	→ Weymouth (loan)	6	(0)
2023	→ Scunthorpe United (loan)	7	(0)
2026–	Carlisle United	3	(3)
- * Club domestic league appearances and goals as of 23:03, 3 May 2026 (UTC)

Harvey James Bunker (born 15 April 2003) is an English professional footballer who plays as a midfielder for National League club Carlisle United.

== Career ==
On 12 November 2019, Bunker made his debut for Forest Green Rovers in a 6–0 EFL Trophy defeat against Walsall. On 12 February 2022, he signed for National League side Weymouth on a one-month loan deal, with the side struggling in the relegation zone.

In January 2022, Bunker signed a new contract that would keep him at the club until the end of the 2022–23 season. On 6 September 2022, he made his league debut as a substitute in a 2–1 League One victory over Accrington Stanley. On 25 October, Bunker scored a first senior goal for Forest Green when he opened the scoring in an eventual 1–1 draw with Fleetwood Town. In February 2023, he signed for National League club Scunthorpe United on loan until the end of the season with a view to getting more first-team minutes.

On 8 May 2026, Forest Green announced it was releasing the player.

== Career statistics ==
As of end of 2025–26 season

Appearances and goals by club, season and competition
Club	Season	League			FA Cup		EFL Cup		Other		Total	
Club	Season	Division	Apps	Goals	Apps	Goals	Apps	Goals	Apps	Goals	Apps	Goals
Forest Green Rovers	2019–20	League Two	0	0	0	0	0	0	1 (Note: Appearance(s) in EFL Trophy)	0	1	0
Forest Green Rovers	2020–21	League Two	0	0	0	0	0	0	2	0	2	0
Forest Green Rovers	2021–22	League Two	0	0	0	0	0	0	2	0	2	0
Forest Green Rovers	2022–23	League One	20	1	1	0	1	0	4	0	26	1
Forest Green Rovers	2023–24	League Two	42	1	3	1	1	0	4	0	50	2
Forest Green Rovers	2024–25	National League	35	5	2	0	—		5 (Note: Two appearances in FA Trophy, two appearances and one goal in National League Cup, one appearance in National League play-offs)	1	42	6
Forest Green Rovers	2025–26	National League	27	3	2	1	—		5 (Note: Three appearances in FA Trophy, two appearances in National League Cup)	0	34	4
Forest Green Rovers	Total		124	10	8	2	2	0	23	1	157	13
Chippenham Town (loan)	2021–22	National League South	12	2	3	1	—		—		15	3
Weymouth (loan)	2021–22	National League	6	0	—		—		—		6	0
Scunthorpe United (loan)	2022–23	National League	7	0	—		—		—		7	0
Career total			149	12	11	3	2	0	23	1	185	16

== Honours ==
Individual

- Forest Green Rovers Young Player of the Season: 2022–23
