= Ben Stevenson (footballer) =

English footballer (born 1997)

Personal information
- Full name: Ben Edward Stevenson
- Date of birth: 23 March 1997 (age 29)
- Place of birth: Leicester, England
- Height: 6 ft 0 in (1.83 m)
- Position: Midfielder

Team information
- Current team: Cheltenham Town
- Number: 7

Youth career
- 2005–2015: Coventry City

Senior career*
Years	Team	Apps	(Gls)
2015–2018	Coventry City	33	(2)
2018–2019	Wolverhampton Wanderers	0	(0)
2018	→ Colchester United (loan)	13	(2)
2018	→ Jumilla (loan)	15	(0)
2019–2021	Colchester United	74	(4)
2021–2023	Forest Green Rovers	70	(0)
2023–2025	Portsmouth	5	(0)
2025	Cambridge United	17	(0)
2025–	Cheltenham Town	45	(0)
- * Club domestic league appearances and goals as of 16:43, 22 November 2026 (UTC)

Ben Edward Stevenson (born 23 March 1997) is an English professional footballer who plays as a midfielder for EFL League Two club Cheltenham Town.

Stevenson is a graduate of the Coventry City Academy. He spent 13 years with the club, joining at the age of eight. He made his professional debut in August 2016 and made 48 appearances for the club. In January 2018, he was sold to Championship side Wolverhampton Wanderers. He was immediately loaned out to Colchester United, and then joined Wolves' Spanish affiliate club Jumilla on loan for the first-half of 2018–19. In January 2019, he rejoined Colchester United on a permanent basis.

== Career ==
Born in Leicester, Stevenson joined the Coventry City Academy at the age of eight. He signed on as a scholar in July 2013, and signed his first professional contract in 2015.

Stevenson made his professional debut on 9 August 2016, playing 120 minutes in Coventry's 3–2 extra time win over Portsmouth in the League Cup. He scored his first professional goal on 18 October 2016 during a 2–1 win over Oxford United. He scored his second goal for Coventry in their 2–1 home defeat by Milton Keynes Dons on 26 November 2016, but was sent off for the first time in his career after 74-minutes for a high challenge on Dean Lewington. He helped the club to the EFL Trophy and played in the final at Wembley Stadium as City beat Oxford United 2–1.

After making 36 appearances in his debut season, Stevenson was limited to twelve appearances in the first-half of the 2017–18 season through both injury and falling down the pecking order at the club.

On 31 January 2018, Stevenson signed a 2 1/2-year deal with Championship side Wolverhampton Wanderers for an undisclosed fee. He was immediately loaned out to Coventry's League Two rivals Colchester United for the remainder of the 2017–18 season.

Stevenson made his Colchester United debut on 3 February 2018, coming on as a substitute for Sean Murray before scoring the game's opening goal ten minutes after his arrival on the pitch. Colchester went on to win the match against Newport County 2–0. He made 13 appearances for the U's, scoring twice.

On 31 August 2018, Stevenson was one of nine Wolves players sent to their Spanish affiliate club Jumilla on loan until the end of the 2018–19 season. He made 15 appearances for the club.

Colchester United re-signed Stevenson on a permanent basis on 30 January 2019, signing a 2 1/2-year deal from Wolves. He made his second debut for the club on 2 February, starting in their 4–0 win at Northampton Town.

An excellent Carabao Cup run with some notable wins against Premiership teams Crystal Palace and Tottenham Hotspur took them to the quarter-finals against Manchester United at Old Trafford eventually losing 3-0.

On 7 June 2021, Stevenson announced he would be leaving Colchester at the end of his contract after making almost 100 appearances for the U's.

Stevenson signed for Forest Green Rovers on a two-year deal on 21 June 2021 Forest Green won promotion to League One as champions in the 21/22 season. Following their relegation back to League Two at the end of the 2022–23 season, Stevenson departed the club on a free transfer.

On 21 June 2023, Stevenson returned to League One when he signed for Portsmouth on a two-year contract with the option for a further year. Stevenson's debut for Portsmouth came in an EFL Cup tie against Forest Green Rovers, and his league debut followed against Port Vale on 7 October 2023. He scored his first goal for Portsmouth on 10 October 2023 in an EFL Trophy tie against Gillingham.

On 8 May 2025, Cambridge announced he would be leaving in June when his contract expired.

On 4 October 2025, Stevenson signed for League Two club Cheltenham Town on a deal until the end of the season, with the option to extend.

On 5 May 2026, Stevenson signed a new contract to remain with the club for the 2026–27 season.

== Career statistics ==
As of match played 21 November 2026

Appearances and goals by club, season and competition
Club	Season	League			National Cup		League Cup		Other		Total	
Club	Season	Division	Apps	Goals	Apps	Goals	Apps	Goals	Apps	Goals	Apps	Goals
Coventry City	2016–17	League One	28	2	2	0	2	0	4 (Note: Appearance(s) in EFL Trophy)	0	36	2
Coventry City	2017–18	League Two	5	0	3	0	1	0	3	1	12	1
Coventry City	Total		33	2	5	0	3	0	7	1	48	3
Wolverhampton Wanderers	2017–18	Championship	0	0	–		–		0	0	0	0
Wolverhampton Wanderers	2018–19	Premier League	0	0	0	0	0	0	–		0	0
Wolverhampton Wanderers	Total		0	0	0	0	0	0	0	0	0	0
Colchester United (loan)	2017–18	League Two	13	2	–		–		0	0	13	2
Jumilla (loan)	2018–19	Segunda División B – Group IV	15	0	0	0	–		0	0	15	0
Colchester United	2018–19	League Two	14	0	–		–		0	0	14	0
Colchester United	2019–20	League Two	28	2	1	0	5	0	2 (Note: Appearances in EFL League Two play-offs)	0	36	2
Colchester United	2020–21	League Two	32	2	0	0	1	0	1	0	34	2
Colchester United	Total		74	4	1	0	6	0	3	0	97	4
Forest Green Rovers	2021–22	League Two	41	0	1	0	1	0	1	0	44	0
Forest Green Rovers	2022–23	League One	29	0	2	1	2	0	2	1	35	2
Forest Green Rovers	Total		70	0	3	1	3	0	3	1	79	2
Portsmouth	2023–24	League One	4	0	0	0	2	0	4	1	10	1
Portsmouth	2024–25	Championship	1	0	0	0	1	0	0	0	2	0
Portsmouth	Total		5	0	0	0	3	0	4	1	12	1
Cambridge United	2024–25	League One	17	0	–		–		–		17	0
Cheltenham Town	2025–26	League Two	30	0	3	0	–		0	0	33	0
Cheltenham Town	2026–27	League Two	15	0	1	0	1	0	1	0	18	0
Cheltenham Town	Total		45	0	4	0	1	0	1	0	51	0
Career total			272	8	13	1	16	0	18	3	319	12

== Honours ==
Coventry City

- EFL Trophy: 2016–17

Forest Green Rovers

- EFL League Two: 2021–22

Portsmouth

- EFL League One: 2023–24
