= Oliver Casey =

English footballer

Personal information
- Full name: Oliver Joseph Casey
- Date of birth: 19 December 2000 (age 25)
- Place of birth: Leeds, England
- Height: 6 ft 2 in (1.88 m)
- Position: Centre-back

Team information
- Current team: Blackpool
- Number: 4

Youth career
- 2017–2019: Leeds United

Senior career*
Years	Team	Apps	(Gls)
2019–2021	Leeds United	1	(0)
2021–	Blackpool	122	(6)
2022–2023	→ Forest Green Rovers (loan)	39	(0)
- * Club domestic league appearances and goals as of 17:09, 12 May 2026 (UTC)

Oliver Joseph Casey (born 19 December 2000) is an English professional footballer who plays as a centre-back for EFL League One side Blackpool. He has previously played for Leeds United.

Casey began his career at Leeds United, moving up the youth ranks before making his senior debut in the Championship in 2019. After 10 years with the club, he moved to Blackpool in 2021. He struggled for gametime in his first season however, and consequently moved to League One club Forest Green Rovers on loan in 2022. He had a successful loan with Forest Green Rovers, making 48 appearances and winning Players' Player of the Season despite being relegated. On his return to Blackpool, he made 29 league appearances in his first season. The following season, he established himself as a key player under manager Steve Bruce.

== Career ==
=== Leeds United ===
Born in Leeds, Casey came through the academy at Leeds United, joining at the age of 10. After impressing for Leeds' under 18s, winning the 2017–18 Professional Development League North in the process, and under 23s, he signed a two-year professional contract with the club in November 2018, making his professional debut on 7 December 2019 as an 85th-minute substitute for Mateusz Klich in a 2–0 victory at Huddersfield Town. With Leeds promoted to the Premier League as Championship champions, and Casey receiving a Championship winners medal, he signed a new three-year contract with the club on 14 July 2020. He made two appearances for Leeds' first team across the 2020–21 season, both in cup competitions, and made 21 appearances for the under-23 side as they won the Premier League 2 Division Two for the 2020–21 season. He looked to leave at the start of the 2021–22 season however in search of more gametime, and signed for Blackpool after 10 years with Leeds.

=== Blackpool ===
==== 2021–2022 season ====
On 22 June 2021, Casey signed a three-year contract with Championship club Blackpool, which went through on 1 July, for an undisclosed fee. It included the option to extend by an additional year. He made his Blackpool debut on 11 August in a 3–0 win in the EFL Cup over Middlesbrough. Once again with limited gametime, he looked to go on loan but ultimately stayed at Blackpool. His league debut came on 12 February 2022 in a 2–1 defeat to Bournemouth. He made his first start on 23 February in a 2–1 defeat to Queens Park Rangers. Casey also scored his first goal that season in a 2–0 victory against Barnsley on 26 April. He played in Blackpool's last three league games, the team eventually finishing 16th. He totalled 6 league appearances in his debut Blackpool campaign that season, 8 in all competitions. With limited gametime however, he departed on loan for the following season to League One side Forest Green Rovers.

==== 2022–2023 season: Loan to Forest Green Rovers ====
Casey made his Forest Green Rovers debut on 30 July 2022 in a 2–1 win over Bristol Rovers, coming on for Corey O'Keeffe. His first start came on 13 August in a 1–1 draw against Lincoln City. He scored his first goal for the club on 30 August in a 3–1 win over the Southampton U21 in the EFL Trophy. Casey was sent off in a 2–1 loss against Accrington Stanley on 4 March 2023. Following 48 appearances in all competitions in the 2023–24 season, he won the Forest Green Rovers Players' Player of the Season award. However, he was unable to prevent Forest Green Rovers from being relegated.

==== 2023–2024 season ====
Casey started the season with a 2–0 win over Burton Albion on 5 August 2023, coming in for injured Matthew Pennington. He started regularly for Neil Critchley's side, displacing 2021/22 Blackpool Player of the Year Marvin Ekpiteta. He credited this to his loan at Forest Green Rovers, saying, "My time on loan with Forest Green helped me a lot—they were lower down the table so there was a lot of defending and a lot of hard work." Casey was rewarded with a new three-year contract in November 2023 with an option to extend for a further year. He was sent off on 28 October in a 4–2 defeat to Peterborough United. As a result, he had to serve a match ban, but this was later extended to three. He made his return on 14 November 2023 when he captained Blackpool in their 2–1 victory over Morecambe in the EFL Trophy. Following his suspension, he was briefly unable to regain his spot in the first-team, being limited to cup matches. His league return came on 26 December in a 1–0 defeat to Burton Albion. On 1 January 2024, Casey scored his first goal of the season in a 2–0 victory against Lincoln City. He finished the season with 29 league appearances.

==== 2024–2025 season ====
On 10 August 2024, Casey started the season opener, a 2–1 loss against Crawley Town. On 3 September, Steve Bruce was hired as manager, signing a two-year contract to replace Neil Critchley. Casey started Bruce's debut match on 14 September, which finished in a 2–1 win against Exeter City. He also started the next match, a 1–0 defeat against Sheffield Wednesday on 17 September in the EFL Cup. This made him the only player to start both of Bruce's first two matches. He scored his first goal of the season in a 2–1 defeat to Barnsley on 19 October. Casey became a key player under Bruce, being praised for his consistency and his defensive partnerships with Matthew Pennington and Odeluga Offiah, with Bruce stating, "Big Olly [Casey] has been our most consistent performer." On 26 November, Blackpool beat Bristol Rovers 2–0; but Casey picked up his fifth yellow card of the campaign, meaning he was suspended for a league match. He made his league return on 14 December in a 3–0 victory against Reading. He won both December and January Player of the Month awards for Blackpool.

== Career statistics ==
As of end of 2025–26 season

Appearances and goals by club, season and competition
Club	Season	League			FA Cup		EFL Cup		Other		Total	
Club	Season	Division	Apps	Goals	Apps	Goals	Apps	Goals	Apps	Goals	Apps	Goals
Leeds United	2019–20	Championship	1	0	0	0	0	0	–		1	0
Leeds United	2020–21	Premier League	0	0	1	0	1	0	–		2	0
Leeds United	Total		1	0	1	0	1	0	–		3	0
Leeds United U21	2020–21	—			—		—		2 (Note: Appearance(s) in EFL Trophy)	0	2	0
Blackpool	2021–22	Championship	6	1	0	0	2	0	–		8	1
Blackpool	2022–23	Championship	0	0	0	0	0	0	–		0	0
Blackpool	2023–24	League One	29	1	2	0	1	0	4	0	36	1
Blackpool	2024–25	League One	43	3	2	0	3	0	1	0	49	3
Blackpool	2025–26	League One	44	1	3	0	1	0	0	0	48	1
Blackpool	Total		122	6	7	0	7	0	5	0	141	6
Forest Green Rovers (loan)	2022–23	League One	39	0	3	0	2	0	4	1	48	1
Career total			162	6	11	0	10	0	11	1	194	7

== Honours ==
Leeds United

- EFL Championship: 2019–20

Individual

- Forest Green Rovers Players' Player of the Season: 2022–23
