= Brandon Njoku =

English footballer (born 2004)

Personal information
- Full name: Brandon Chimere Njoku
- Date of birth: 16 November 2004 (age 21)
- Place of birth: Brent, England
- Position: Forward

Team information
- Current team: Sutton United
- Number: 16

Youth career
- 2020-2021: West Ham United
- 2021–2023: Cambridge United

Senior career*
Years	Team	Apps	(Gls)
2023–2025	Cambridge United	28	(1)
2022–2023	→ St Neots Town (loan)	11	(4)
2023	→ Cheshunt (loan)	1	(1)
2023	→ Braintree Town (loan)	3	(0)
2023	→ St Ives Town (loan)	19	(13)
2024	→ Peterborough Sports (loan)	5	(1)
2025–	Sutton United	48	(10)
- * Club domestic league appearances and goals as of 19:21, 21 September 2026 (UTC)

Brandon Chimere Njoku (born 16 November 2004) is an English professional footballer who plays as a forward for National League club Sutton United.

== Club career ==
=== Cambridge United ===
Njoku joined Cambridge United's academy in the summer of 2021 following time at West Ham. He was part of the United side who reached the quarter-finals of the FA Youth Cup during the 2022–23 season, scoring in multiple rounds, including a late winner in the Fifth Round tie against Sheffield Wednesday. As well as this, Njoku spent time on loan at St Neots Town, Cheshunt, and Braintree Town.

He signed professional terms with Cambridge in June 2023, and appeared for the club in pre-season, scoring in a friendly at St Albans City. Njoku went on to spend the first half of the 2023–24 season at St Ives Town before being recalled on 1 January 2024, making his debut for Cambridge United the same day, coming off the bench in a 2–0 defeat to Leyton Orient. He was again named in the squad for the clubs next league game against Fleetwood Town and came off the bench to help the U's win 2–1, with manager Neil Harris praising his impact. On 29 March 2024, Njoku was loaned out to Peterborough Sports.

On 8 May 2025, Cambridge announced he would be leaving in June when his contract expired.

=== Sutton United ===
On 29 July 2025, Njoku joined National League side Sutton United.

== Career statistics ==
=== Club ===
As of match played 12 April 2025.

Appearances and goals by club, season and competition
Club	Season	League			FA Cup		EFL Cup		Other		Total	
Club	Season	Division	Apps	Goals	Apps	Goals	Apps	Goals	Apps	Goals	Apps	Goals
St Neots Town (loan)	2022–23	Northern Premier League Division One Midlands	11	4	0	0	—		0	0	11	4
Cheshunt (loan)	2022–23	National League South	1	1	0	0	—		0	0	1	1
Braintree Town (loan)	2022–23	National League South	3	0	0	0	—		0	0	3	0
Cambridge United	2023–24	League One	3	0	—		0	0	0	0	3	0
Cambridge United	2024–25	League One	25	1	2	1	1	0	4	0	32	2
Cambridge United	Total		28	1	2	1	1	0	4	0	35	2
St Ives Town (loan)	2023–24	Southern Football League Premier Division Central	19	13	1	0	—		1 (Note: Appearances in FA Trophy)	0	21	13
Peterborough Sports (loan)	2023-24	National League North	5	1	0	0	0	0	0	0	5	1
Career total			67	20	3	1	1	0	5	0	76	21
