= Christian Marques =

Portuguese footballer (born 2003)

Personal information
- Full name: Christian Fernandes Marques
- Date of birth: 15 January 2003 (age 23)
- Place of birth: Uster, Switzerland
- Height: 1.88 m (6 ft 2 in)
- Position: Centre-back

Team information
- Current team: Tondela
- Number: 4

Youth career
- –2018: Grasshoppers
- 2019–2020: Wolverhampton Wanderers

Senior career*
| Years | Team | Apps | (Gls) |
| 2020–2023 | Wolverhampton Wanderers | 0 | (0) |
| 2021–2022 | → Belenenses SAD (loan) | 0 | (0) |
| 2022 | → Forest Green Rovers (loan) | 13 | (0) |
| 2023–2025 | Yverdon-Sport | 52 | (1) |
| 2025– | Tondela | 31 | (0) |

International career^{‡}
| 2017–2018 | Switzerland U15 | 8 | (0) |
| 2018–2019 | Switzerland U16 | 8 | (0) |
| 2019 | Switzerland U17 | 5 | (0) |
| 2021 | Portugal U19 | 3 | (0) |
| 2022 | Portugal U20 | 1 | (0) |
| 2024–2025 | Portugal U21 | 4 | (0) |
- * Club domestic league appearances and goals as of 18 May 2026 ‡ National team caps and goals as of 24 March 2025

Christian Fernandes Marques (born 15 January 2003) is a professional footballer who plays as a centre-back for Primeira Liga club Tondela. Born in Switzerland, he is a Portugal youth international.

== Career ==
Before the second half of 2018–19, Marques joined the youth academy of English Premier League side Wolves. In 2021, he was sent on loan to B-SAD in Portugal. However due to a lack of game time at the Portuguese club, Marques was recalled by Wolves and given more game time in their U23 setup for the remaining season.

On 1 September 2022, Wolves loaned out Marques to newly promoted League One side, Forest Green Rovers for the 2022–23 season. On 6 September 2022, Marques made his English Football League debut playing 90 minutes for Forest Green in a 2–1 victory over Accrington Stanley. Having suffered a "long-term injury", Marques returned to his parent club on 12 December 2022.

On 7 September 2023, Marques signed a two-year contract with Yverdon-Sport.

On 21 July 2025, Marques joined Primeira Liga team Tondela.

== Career statistics ==
=== Club ===
As of 12 December 2022

Appearances and goals by club, season and competition
| Club | Season | League | | | National cup (Note: Includes FA Cup, Taça de Portugal and Swiss Cup) | | League cup (Note: Includes EFL Cup and Taça da Liga) | | Other | | Total | |
| Club | Season | Division | Apps | Goals | Apps | Goals | Apps | Goals | Apps | Goals | Apps | Goals |
|---|---|---|---|---|---|---|---|---|---|---|---|---|
| Wolverhampton Wanderers U21 | 2019–20 | — | | | — | | — | | 2 (Note: Appearance(s) in EFL Trophy) | 0 | 2 | 0 |
| Wolverhampton Wanderers U21 | 2020–21 | — | | | — | | — | | 3 | 0 | 3 | 0 |
| Wolverhampton Wanderers U21 | Total | | — | | — | | — | | 5 | 0 | 5 | 0 |
| Wolverhampton Wanderers | 2021–22 | Premier League | 0 | 0 | 0 | 0 | 0 | 0 | — | | 0 | 0 |
| Wolverhampton Wanderers | 2022–23 | Premier League | 0 | 0 | 0 | 0 | 0 | 0 | — | | 0 | 0 |
| Wolverhampton Wanderers | Total | | 0 | 0 | 0 | 0 | 0 | 0 | — | | 0 | 0 |
| B-SAD (loan) | 2021–22 | Primeira Liga | 0 | 0 | 0 | 0 | 0 | 0 | — | | 0 | 0 |
| Forest Green Rovers (loan) | 2022–23 | League One | 13 | 0 | 0 | 0 | — | | 0 | 0 | 13 | 0 |
| Yverdon-Sport | 2023–24 | Swiss Super League | 15 | 0 | 0 | 0 | — | | — | | 15 | 0 |
| Yverdon-Sport | 2024–25 | Swiss Super League | 37 | 1 | 2 | 0 | — | | — | | 39 | 1 |
| Yverdon-Sport | Total | | 52 | 1 | 2 | 0 | — | | — | | 54 | 1 |
| Tondela | 2025–26 | Primeira Liga | 19 | 0 | 2 | 0 | 1 | 0 | — | | 22 | 0 |
| Career total | | | 84 | 1 | 4 | 0 | 1 | 0 | 5 | 0 | 94 | 1 |
