= Jacob Jones (footballer) =

Welsh footballer (born 2001)

Personal information
- Full name: Jacob Alexander Jones
- Date of birth: 5 September 2001 (age 25)
- Position: Defender

Team information
- Current team: Briton Ferry Llansawel
- Number: 21

Youth career
- Swansea City

Senior career*
| Years | Team | Apps | (Gls) |
| 2022–2023 | Forest Green Rovers | 2 | (0) |
| 2022 | → Bath City (loan) | 4 | (0) |
| 2023 | → King's Lynn Town (loan) | 10 | (0) |
| 2023–2024 | Cove Rangers | 26 | (0) |
| 2024–2025 | Woking | 11 | (0) |
| 2025–2026 | Penybont | 21 | (0) |
| 2026– | Briton Ferry Llansawel | 12 | (0) |

International career
| 2020 | Wales U20 | 1 | (0) |
- * Club domestic league appearances and goals as of 07:44, 8 November 2026 (UTC)

Jacob Alexander Jones (born 5 September 2001) is a Welsh professional footballer who plays as a defender for Cymru Premier club Briton Ferry Llansawel.

== Club career ==
Jones began his career at Swansea City, before moving to Forest Green Rovers in July 2022. In October 2022, Jones joined National League South club Bath City on a one-month loan deal. On 2 February 2023, Jones joined National League North club King's Lynn Town on loan until the end of the season. Jones left Rovers at the end of the season.

Following a brief trial with Dundee, Jones joined Scottish League One club Cove Rangers on a two-year deal in July 2023.

In May 2024, Jones returned to England, joining National League side Woking. On 6 May 2025, it was announced that Jones would leave the club upon the expiry of his contract in June. He departed having made 16 appearances.

Jones joined Cymru Premier club Penybont on a free transfer on 20 June 2025. The following close season he moved to Briton Ferry Llansawel.

== International career ==
Jones is a Wales national under-20 youth international. He made his debut as a substitute against England U20s in October 2020.

== Career statistics ==
As of match played 26 April 2025.

Appearances and goals by club, season and competition
| Club | Season | League | | | FA Cup | | EFL Cup | | Other | | Total | |
| Club | Season | Division | Apps | Goals | Apps | Goals | Apps | Goals | Apps | Goals | Apps | Goals |
|---|---|---|---|---|---|---|---|---|---|---|---|---|
| Swansea City U21 | 2018–19 | — | | | — | | — | | 1 (Note: Appearances in the EFL Trophy) | 0 | 1 | 0 |
| Forest Green Rovers | 2022–23 | League One | 2 | 0 | 0 | 0 | 1 | 0 | 3 | 0 | 6 | 0 |
| Bath City (loan) | 2022–23 | National League South | 4 | 0 | — | | — | | 0 | 0 | 4 | 0 |
| King's Lynn Town (loan) | 2022–23 | National League North | 10 | 0 | — | | — | | — | | 10 | 0 |
| Cove Rangers | 2023–24 | Scottish League One | 26 | 0 | 1 | 0 | 2 | 0 | 0 | 0 | 29 | 0 |
| Woking | 2024–25 | National League | 11 | 0 | 0 | 0 | — | | 5 (Note: Three appearances in FA Trophy; two appearances in National League Cup) | 0 | 16 | 0 |
| Career total | | | 53 | 0 | 1 | 0 | 3 | 0 | 9 | 0 | 66 | 0 |
