= Daniel Barton (footballer) =

English footballer (born 2005)

Personal information
- Date of birth: 28 January 2005 (age 21)
- Place of birth: England
- Position: Forward

Team information
- Current team: Spalding United

Youth career
- ????–2023: Cambridge United

Senior career*
Years	Team	Apps	(Gls)
2023–2025	Cambridge United	16	(0)
2022	→ Dereham Town (loan)		
2022–2023	→ St Neots Town (loan)		
2023–2024	→ St Ives Town (loan)		
2026	The New Saints	7	(1)
2026–	Spalding United		
- * Club domestic league appearances and goals as of 11:25, 20 April 2026 (UTC)

Daniel Barton (born 28 January 2005) is an English professional footballer who plays as a forward for Spalding United. He has English Football League appearances for this first club, Cambridge United.

== Club career ==
Barton signed professional terms with Cambridge in June 2023 and made his first appearance for the club, coming on as a substitute in an EFL League One match against Stockport County. Whilst with the club he spent time on loan at Dereham Town, St Neots Town and St Ives Town. Having broken into the first team, in October 2024 he suffered a knee injury which led to missing much of the 2024–25 season.

On 8 May 2025, Cambridge announced he would be leaving in June when his contract expired.

On 5 February 2026, Cymru Premier club The New Saints announced he had signed a contract with them. He made his club debut two days later as a substitute in a 6–0 league win against Penybont.

In September 2026 he joined Spalding United

== Career statistics ==
=== Club ===
As of match played 8 March 2025.

Appearances and goals by club, season and competition
Club	Season	League			FA Cup		EFL Cup		Other		Total	
Club	Season	Division	Apps	Goals	Apps	Goals	Apps	Goals	Apps	Goals	Apps	Goals
Cambridge United	2024–25	League One	16	0	0	0	1	0	3	1	20	1
Career total			16	0	0	0	1	0	3	1	20	1
