= 2022–23 Forest Green Rovers F.C. season =

Forest Green Rovers
2022–23 season
- Owner: Dale Vince
- Chairman: Dale Vince
- Head Coach: Ian Burchnall (until 25 January); Duncan Ferguson (from 26 January)
- Stadium: The New Lawn
- League One: 24th (relegated to League Two)
- FA Cup: Third round
- EFL Cup: Second round
- EFL Trophy: Second round

The 2022–23 season was the 134th season in the existence of Forest Green Rovers Football Club and the club's first ever season in League One following their promotion from League Two in the previous season. In addition to the league, they also competed in the 2022–23 FA Cup, the 2022–23 EFL Cup and the 2022–23 EFL Trophy.

== Transfers ==
=== In ===
Date	Pos	Player	Transferred from	Fee	Ref
1 July 2022 (Note: The transfer was announced on 30 June, and would become official on July 1, once his Huddersfield Town contract expired)	CM	(England) Reece Brown	(England) Huddersfield Town	Free Transfer	
1 July 2022 (Note: The transfer was announced on 17 June, and would become official on July 1, once his Rotherham United contract expired)	GK	(England) Alfie Burnett	(England) Rotherham United	Free Transfer	
1 July 2022 (Note: The transfer was announced on 17 June, and would become official on July 1, once his Shrewsbury Town contract expired)	CM	(England) David Davis	(England) Shrewsbury Town	Free Transfer	
1 July 2022 (Note: The transfer was announced on 8 June, and would become official on July 1, once his Torquay United contract expired)	AM	(England) Armani Little	(England) Torquay United	Free Transfer	
1 July 2022 (Note: The transfer was announced on 17 June, and would become official on July 1, once his St Mirren contract expired)	RW	(Scotland) Kyle McAllister	(Scotland) St Mirren	Free Transfer	
1 July 2022 (Note: The transfer was announced on 7 June, and would become official on July 1, once his Rochdale contract expired)	RB	(Republic of Ireland) Corey O'Keeffe	(England) Rochdale	Free Transfer	
19 July 2022	LB	(Wales) Jacob Jones	(Wales) Swansea City	Free Transfer	
3 August 2022	CF	(England) Connor Wickham	(England) Milton Keynes Dons	Free Transfer	
4 August 2022	RB	(England) Sean Robertson	(England) Crystal Palace	Free Transfer	
7 September 2022	FW	(Republic of Ireland) Sean O'Brien	(England) Millwall	Free Transfer	
22 November 2022	CM	(Scotland) Dylan McGeouch	(Scotland) Aberdeen	Free Transfer	
3 January 2023	GK	(Republic of Ireland) Fiachra Pagel	(Republic of Ireland) Drogheda United	Undisclosed	
5 January 2023	RW	(England) Jordon Garrick	(Wales) Swansea City	Undisclosed	
6 January 2023	LB	(Scotland) Jamie Robson	(England) Lincoln City	Undisclosed	
10 January 2023	GK	(Scotland) Ross Doohan	(England) Tranmere Rovers	Undisclosed	
12 January 2023	CF	(Sierra Leone) Amadou Bakayoko	(England) Bolton Wanderers	Undisclosed	
23 January 2023	CF	(Belgium) Tyrese Omotoye	(England) Norwich City	Undisclosed	
24 January 2023	DM	(Northern Ireland) Charlie McCann	(Scotland) Rangers	Undisclosed	

=== Out ===
Date	Pos	Player	Transferred to	Fee	Ref
10 June 2022	RB	(England) Kane Wilson	(England) Bristol City	Compensation	
10 June 2022 (Note: The transfer was announced on 20 May, and would become official on June 10, once the transfer window opened)	CF	(England) Jake Young	(England) Bradford City	Undisclosed	
30 June 2022 (Note: The transfer was announced on 13 May, and would become official, once his contract at the club expired)	CM	(The Gambia) Ebou Adams	(Wales) Cardiff City	Free Transfer	
30 June 2022	CM	(England) Taylor Allen	(England) Walsall	Released	
30 June 2022	LM	(Scotland) Nicky Cadden	(England) Barnsley	Free Transfer	
30 June 2022	RW	(United States) Vaughn Covil	(England) Hull City	Released	
30 June 2022	LB	(England) Jack Evans	(England) Hereford	Released	
30 June 2022	RW	(England) Opi Edwards	(United States) Rochester New York	Released	
30 June 2022	DF	(England) Luke Hallett	(England) AFC Totton	Released	
30 June 2022 (Note: The transfer was announced on 18 June, and would become official, once his contract at the club expired)	CB	(England) Dan Sweeney	(England) Stevenage	Free Transfer	
30 June 2022	CM	(England) Elliott Whitehouse	(England) Scunthorpe United	Released	
15 July 2022	DM	(England) Sadou Diallo	(Northern Ireland) Derry City	Undisclosed	
3 January 2023	CF	(England) Connor Wickham	Free agent	Released	
13 January 2023	CF	(Jamaica) Jamille Matt	(England) Walsall	Undisclosed	
30 January 2023	CF	(England) Josh March	(England) Stevenage	Undisclosed	

=== Loans in ===
Date	Pos	Player	Loaned from	On loan until	Ref
27 June 2022	LB	(England) Harry Boyes	(England) Sheffield United	2 January 2023 (Note: On 2 January, Boyes was recalled back to Sheffield United)	
5 July 2022	CB	(England) Oliver Casey	(England) Blackpool	End of Season	
22 August 2022	AM	(England) Myles Peart-Harris	(England) Brentford	End of Season (Note: On 3 January, Peart-Harris' loan was extended until the end of the season)	
1 September 2022	CF	(Norway) Bryan Fiabema	(England) Chelsea	31 January 2023 (Note: On 31 January, Fiabema was recalled back to Chelsea)	
1 September 2022	CB	(Portugal) Christian Marques	(England) Wolverhampton Wanderers	12 December 2022 (Note: On 12 December, Marques returned to Wolves due to a long-term injury.)	
3 January 2023	CB	(Wales) Brandon Cooper	(Wales) Swansea City	End of Season	
27 January 2023	CM	(England) Tyler Onyango	(England) Everton	End of Season	
27 January 2023	DM	(Wales) Charlie Savage	(England) Manchester United	End of Season	
31 January 2023	CF	(Jamaica) Jahmari Clarke	(England) Reading	End of Season	

=== Loans out ===
Date	Pos	Player	Loaned to	On loan until	Ref
13 October 2022	LB	(Wales) Jacob Jones	(England) Bath City		
8 November 2022	CF	(Republic of Ireland) Sean O'Brien	(England) Gloucester City	8 December 2022	
3 January 2023	GK	(Republic of Ireland) Fiachra Pagel	(Republic of Ireland) Drogheda United	End of Season	
12 January 2023	CM	(England) Armani Little	(England) AFC Wimbledon	End of Season	
29 January 2023	GK	(England) Luke McGee	(England) Derby County	End of Season	
30 January 2023	CM	(England) David Davis	(England) Solihull Moors	End of Season	
31 January 2023	CM	(Scotland) Regan Hendry	(England) Tranmere Rovers	End of Season	
31 January 2023	RB	(England) Sean Robertson	(England) Crewe Alexandra	End of Season	
31 January 2023	CF	(England) Matty Stevens	(England) Walsall	End of Season	
2 February 2023	DM	(England) Harvey Bunker	(England) Scunthorpe United	9 March 2023 (Note: On 9 March, Bunker was recalled back from his loan at Scunthorpe)	
2 February 2023	LB	(Wales) Jacob Jones	(England) King's Lynn Town	End of Season	

== Pre-season and friendlies ==
On June 14, FGR announced three pre-season friendlies against Melksham Town, Swindon Supermarine and Newport County.

Win Draw Loss Fixtures

28 June 2022 Friendly	Melksham Town	0–3	Forest Green Rovers	Melksham
19:45 BST		Report	Little 27'; Matt 38'; March 61'	Stadium: Oakfield Stadium

9 July 2022 Friendly	Swansea City	3–2	Forest Green Rovers	Upper Killay
13:00 BST	Obafemi 12'; Naughton 43'; Cullen 86'	Report	Brown (?); Little (?)	Stadium: Fairwood Training Ground; Attendance: 0 (behind-closed-doors)

12 July 2022 Friendly	Coventry City	1–0	Forest Green Rovers	Newport
13:00 BST	Sheaf 11'	Report		Stadium: Lilleshall Sports Centre; Attendance: 0 (behind-closed-doors)

16 July 2022 Friendly	Swindon Supermarine	1–2	Forest Green Rovers	South Marston
13:00 BST	Harding 21'		March 19'; Little 71'	Stadium: Hunts Copse

19 July 2022 Friendly	Bristol City	3–1	Forest Green Rovers	Failand
14:00 BST	Martin 24'; Weimann 46'; Sykes 51'	Report	March 75'	Stadium: Robins High Performance Centre

23 July 2022 Friendly	Forest Green Rovers	1–1	Newport County	Nailsworth
15:00 BST	Matt 47' (pen.)	Report	Zanzala 59'	Stadium: The New Lawn

== Competitions ==
=== Overall record ===
Competition	First match	Last match	Starting round	Record							
Competition	First match	Last match	Starting round	Pld	W	D	L	GF	GA	GD	Win %
League One	August 2022	May 2023	Matchday 1	38	6	8	24	29	71	−42	15.79
FA Cup	TBC	TBC	First round	3	2	0	1	5	3	+2	66.67
EFL Cup	TBC	TBC	First round	2	1	0	1	2	3	−1	50.00
EFL Trophy	TBC	TBC	Group stage	4	3	1	0	10	4	+6	75.00
Total				47	12	9	26	46	81	−35	25.53

Last updated: 28 Mar 2023
Source: [ Soccerway]

=== League One ===
==== League table ====
Pos	Team	Pld	W	D	L	GF	GA	GD	Pts	Promotion, qualification or relegation
19	Oxford United	46	11	14	21	49	56	−7	47	
20	Cambridge United	46	13	7	26	41	68	−27	46	
21	Milton Keynes Dons (R)	46	11	12	23	44	66	−22	45	Relegation to EFL League Two
22	Morecambe (R)	46	10	14	22	47	78	−31	44	Relegation to EFL League Two
23	Accrington Stanley (R)	46	11	11	24	40	77	−37	44	Relegation to EFL League Two
24	Forest Green Rovers (R)	46	6	9	31	31	89	−58	27	Relegation to EFL League Two

Source: EFL Official Website
Rules for classification: 1) Points; 2) Goal difference; 3) Number of goals scored; 4) Head-to-head results; 5) Wins; 6) Away goals; 7) Penalty points (sec 9.5); 8) 12-point sending off offences
(R) Relegated

==== Results summary ====
Overall								Home						Away					
Pld	W	D	L	GF	GA	GD	Pts	W	D	L	GF	GA	GD	W	D	L	GF	GA	GD
46	6	9	31	31	89	−58	27	5	2	16	15	42	−27	1	7	15	16	47	−31

Last updated: complete.
Source: [ Soccerway]

==== Results by round ====
Round	1	2	3	4	5	6	7	8	9	10	11	12	13	14	15	16	17	18	19	20	21	22	23	24	25	26	27	28	29	30	31	32	33	34	35	36	37	38	39	40	41	42	43	44	45	46
Ground	A	H	A	A	A	H	H	A	H	H	A	H	A	A	H	A	A	H	A	H	H	A	A	H	H	A	H	A	A	H	A	H	A	H	A	H	A	H	A	H	A	H	H	A	H	A
Result	W	L	D	L	L	L	W	D	L	L	L	W	L	D	L	D	L	L	D	W	W	L	L	L	L	D	L	L	L	L	D	L	L	D	L	L	L	W	L	L	L	L	D	L	L	L
Position	3	10	13	20	22	23	21	20	22	22	22	21	21	21	22	22	22	24	24	21	21	21	22	23	24	24	24	24	24	24	24	24	24	24	24	24	24	24	24	24	24	24	24	24	24	24

Source: [ Soccerway]
A = Away; H = Home; W = Win; D = Draw; L = Loss; P = Postponed

==== Matches ====
Win Draw Loss Fixtures

On 23 June, the league fixtures were announced.

30 July 2022 1	Bristol Rovers	1–2	Forest Green Rovers	Horfield
15:00 BST	Collins 71'; Evans (yellow card) 80'	Report	Stevenson (yellow card) 28'; Moore-Taylor 55'; O'Keeffe (yellow card) 61'; Hendry 89'; Matt (yellow card) 90+3'; Cargill (yellow card) 90+5'	Stadium: Memorial Stadium; Attendance: 9,064; Referee: Robert Lewis

6 August 2022 2	Forest Green Rovers	1–2	Ipswich Town	Nailsworth
15:00 BST	Stevenson (yellow card) 50'; March 64'; Brown (yellow card) 78'	Report	Harness 37'; Morsy 45+4'; Burgess (yellow card) 90+1'	Stadium: The New Lawn; Attendance: 4,015; Referee: Craig Hicks

13 August 2022 3	Lincoln City	1–1	Forest Green Rovers	Lincoln
15:00 BST	Bishop (yellow card) 15'; Robson (yellow card) 54'; Cargill 63' (o.g.); Eyoma (yellow card) 75'	Report	Brown (yellow card) 42'; Little (yellow card) 45'; Wickham 73'; Davis (yellow card) 90+2'	Stadium: Sincil Bank; Attendance: 7,374; Referee: Ben Toner

16 August 2022	Forest Green Rovers	Postponed	Accrington Stanley	Nailsworth
19:45 BST				Stadium: The New Lawn
Note: Match was postponed due to a waterlogged pitch.

20 August 2022 4	Forest Green Rovers	0–3	Plymouth Argyle	Nailsworth
15:00 BST	Hendry (yellow card) 74'	Report	Azaz 18'; Mumba 27', (yellow card) 84'; Ennis 61'	Stadium: The New Lawn; Attendance: 3,404; Referee: Darren Drysdale

27 August 2022 5	Sheffield Wednesday	5–0	Forest Green Rovers	Owlerton
15:00 BST	Windass 12'; Bannan 19'; Palmer 31'; Johnson (yellow card) 37'; Gregory 45+1'; Bernard 56' (o.g.)	Report	O'Keeffe (yellow card) 37'; Cargill (yellow card) 73'; Davis (yellow card) 85'	Stadium: Hillsborough; Attendance: 22,300; Referee: Simon Mather

3 September 2022 6	Forest Green Rovers	0–2	Shrewsbury Town	Nailsworth
15:00 BST	O'Keeffe (yellow card) 44'; Stevenson (yellow card) 45+9'; McGee (yellow card) 72'	Report	Pyke 10'; Shipley 48'; Bayliss (yellow card) 72'; Moore (yellow card) 83'	Stadium: The New Lawn; Attendance: 2,468; Referee: Peter Wright

6 September 2022 7	Forest Green Rovers	2–1	Accrington Stanley	Nailsworth
19:45 BST	Brown 37', (yellow card) 63'; Peart-Harris (yellow card) 39'; March 81'; Bernard (yellow card) 90+3'	Report	Coyle (yellow card) 38'; Leigh 76'	Stadium: The New Lawn; Attendance: 2,007; Referee: Andy Woolmer

10 September 2022	Peterborough United	Postponed	Forest Green Rovers	Peterborough
15:00 BST				Stadium: London Road Stadium
Note: Fixture was postponed as a mark of respect following the passing of Queen Elizabeth II.

13 September 2022 8	Charlton Athletic	1–1	Forest Green Rovers	Charlton
19:45 BST	Blackett-Taylor 9'; McGrandles (yellow card) 37'; Clare (yellow card) 58'; Inniss (yellow card) 59' (yellow-red card) 90+7'	Report	Davis (yellow card) 42'; Wickham 45'; Bernard (yellow card) 90+4'; O'Keeffe (yellow card) 90+7'	Stadium: The Valley; Attendance: 10,579; Referee: John Busby

17 September 2022 9	Forest Green Rovers	1–2	Morecambe	Nailsworth
15:00 BST	O'Keeffe (yellow card) 27'; Wickham 30', (yellow card) 63'	Report	Phillips 44'; Cooney (yellow card) 52'; Rawson 90+3'	Stadium: The New Lawn; Attendance: 2,601; Referee: Ollie Yates

24 September 2022 10	Forest Green Rovers	0–4	Exeter City	Nailsworth
12:30 BST	Stevenson (yellow card) 25'; March (yellow card) 67'; Fiabema (yellow card) 80'	Report	Nombe 6'; Brown 26' (pen.), 41', 83' (pen.); Stansfield (yellow card) 75'	Stadium: The New Lawn; Attendance: 2,623; Referee: Ben Speedie

1 October 2022 11	Burton Albion	3–2	Forest Green Rovers	Burton upon Trent
15:00 BST	Adeboyejo 6' 82' 90+2'; Hamer (red card) 68'; Oshilaja (yellow card) 90+6'	Report	Brown 52'; Wickham 69' (pen.)	Stadium: Pirelli Stadium; Attendance: 2,620; Referee: Sunny Gill

8 October 2022 12	Forest Green Rovers	1–0	Bolton Wanderers	Nailsworth
15:00 BST	McAllister (yellow card) 19'; Wickham 32'; Marques (yellow card) 58'; Hendry (yellow card) 66'; Cargill (yellow card) 83'	Report		Stadium: The New Lawn; Attendance: 3,419; Referee: Marc Edwards

11 October 2022 13	Peterborough United	4–1	Forest Green Rovers	Peterborough
19:45 BST	Thompson 30'; Clarke-Harris 39'; Jones 46'; Burrows 58'; Taylor (yellow card) 90+2'	Report	March 35'; Boyes (yellow card) 75'	Stadium: London Road Stadium; Attendance: 6,750; Referee: Darren Handley

15 October 2022 14	Port Vale	2–2	Forest Green Rovers	Burslem
15:00 BST	Garrity (yellow card) 27'; Forrester (yellow card) 36'; Odubeko 78'; Harrison 88' (pen.); Wilson (yellow card) 90+1'	Report	Peart-Harris 14'; Hendry (yellow card) 26'; Cargill 37'; Wickham (yellow card) 45'; O'Keeffe (yellow card) 74'; Moore-Taylor (yellow card) 76'; McGee (yellow card) 88'	Stadium: Vale Park; Attendance: 7,092; Referee: Martin Woods

22 October 2022 15	Forest Green Rovers	0–1	Portsmouth	Nailsworth
15:00 BST	Hendry (yellow card) 21'; Little (yellow card) 74'; Cargill (yellow card) 90+2'	Report	Tunnicliffe (yellow card) 14'; Raggett 17'; Scarlett (yellow card) 65'	Stadium: The New Lawn; Attendance: 4,011; Referee: Will Finnie

25 October 2022 16	Fleetwood Town	1–1	Forest Green Rovers	Fleetwood
19:45 BST	Holgate (yellow card) 22'; Morton 70'; Andrew (yellow card) 85'	Report	Bunker 23' (yellow card) 36'; Peart-Harris (yellow card) 50'	Stadium: Highbury Stadium; Attendance: 2,370; Referee: Anthony Backhouse

29 October 2022 17	Barnsley	2–0	Forest Green Rovers	Barnsley
15:00 BST	Cole 15'; Kitching (yellow card) 33'; Martin 83'	Report		Stadium: Oakwell Stadium; Attendance: 9,551; Referee: Bobby Madden

12 November 2022 18	Forest Green Rovers	0–2	Wycombe Wanderers	Nailsworth
15:00 GMT	Thomas (yellow card) 7'; Hendry 62'; Bunker (yellow card) 62'; March (yellow card) 62'	Report	Wheeler 14'; McCleary 27'; Mawson (yellow card) 31'; Grimmer (yellow card) 62'; Mehmeti (yellow card) 62'	Stadium: The New Lawn; Attendance: 2,468; Referee: Sam Purkiss

19 November 2022 19	Oxford United	1–1	Forest Green Rovers	Littlemore
15:00 GMT	Boyes 14' (o.g.); Long (yellow card) 45+3'	Report	Bernard (yellow card) 38'; March (yellow card) 51'; Matt 60', (yellow card) 74'; Peart-Harris (yellow card) 88'; Casey (yellow card) 90+9'; Marques (yellow card) 90+9'	Stadium: The Kassam Stadium; Attendance: 7,813; Referee: Simon Mather

3 December 2022 20	Forest Green Rovers	2–1	Cambridge United	Nailsworth
13:00 GMT	March 37'; Casey (yellow card) 45+1'; Boyes (yellow card) 78'; O'Keeffee (yellow card) 89' (yellow-red card) 90+3'; Wickham 90+3' (pen.); McGeouch (yellow card) 90+6'	Report	Janneh 89'; Smith (yellow card) 90+2'	Stadium: The New Lawn; Attendance: 2,257; Referee: James Oldham

10 December 2022 21	Forest Green Rovers	1–0	Cheltenham Town	Nailsworth
14:00 GMT	Peart-Harris 75'	Report	Williams (yellow card) 16'; Sercombe (yellow card) 45+1'; Freestone (yellow card) 54'	Stadium: The Bolt New Lawn; Attendance: 4,077; Referee: Tom Reeves

17 December 2022 22	Derby County	4–0	Forest Green Rovers	Derby
15:00 GMT	Mendez-Laing 5'; McGoldrick 21', 69', 87'; Collins (yellow card) 43'; Barkhuizen (yellow card) 54'; Sibley (yellow card) 63'	Report		Stadium: Pride Park; Attendance: 24,334; Referee: Ross Joyce

26 December 2022 23	Milton Keynes Dons	1–0	Forest Green Rovers	Denbigh
15:00 GMT	O'Hora (yellow card) 19'; Harvie 58'; McEachran (yellow card) 64'; Tucker (yellow card) 77'; Johnson (yellow card) 84'	Report	Little (yellow card) 76'; Casey (yellow card) 90+2'	Stadium: Stadium MK; Attendance: 6,516; Referee: Ollie Yates

29 December 2022 24	Forest Green Rovers	1–2	Burton Albion	Nailsworth
19:45 GMT	Matt (penalty missed) 67'; Peart-Harris 90+3'; Hendry (yellow card) 90+7'	Report	Brayford 45+2'; Garratt (yellow card) 82'; Oshilaja (yellow card) 86'; Taylor (yellow card) 88'; Kamwa 89'	Stadium: The New Lawn; Attendance: 2,584; Referee: Thomas Kirk

1 January 2023 25	Forest Green Rovers	1–3	Port Vale	Nailsworth
15:00 GMT	McAllister 2'; O'Keeffe (yellow card) 27'; Cargill (yellow card) 43'; Casey (yellow card) 90+15'	Report	Pett (yellow card) 25'; Massey (yellow card) 55'; Benning (yellow card) 70'; Odubeko 86'; Harrison 90+8' (pen.); Politic 90+12'	Stadium: The New Lawn; Attendance: 3,041; Referee: Lee Swabey

14 January 2023 26	Exeter City	1–1	Forest Green Rovers	Exeter
15:00 GMT	Nombe (yellow card) 51'; Brown 75'; White (yellow card) 87'	Report	Garrick 54'; Stevenson (yellow card) 79'	Stadium: St James Park; Attendance: 7,008; Referee: David Rock

21 January 2023 27	Forest Green Rovers	1–2	Milton Keynes Dons	Nailsworth
15:00 GMT	Bakayoko (yellow card) 14'; Peart-Harris 29', (yellow card) 56'	Report	Eisa 43', 51'; Johnson (yellow card) 48'; McEachran (yellow card) 55'; Cumming (yellow card) 86'; Grant (yellow card) 90+9'	Stadium: The New Lawn; Attendance: 2,919; Referee: Anthony Backhouse

24 January 2023 28	Bolton Wanderers	1–0	Forest Green Rovers	Horwich
19:45 GMT	Charles 6', (red card) 28'; Morley (yellow card) 46'	Report	Cooper (yellow card) 45+4'	Stadium: University of Bolton Stadium; Attendance: 16,329; Referee: Tom Nield

28 January 2023 29	Shrewsbury Town	2–1	Forest Green Rovers	Shrewsbury
15:00 GMT	Flanagan (yellow card) 64'; Pyke 90+4'; Saydee (yellow card) 90+6'; Bowman 90+8'	Report	Godwin-Malife (yellow card) 2'; Bakayoko (yellow card) 12'; Garrick 18'	Stadium: New Meadow; Attendance: 6,310; Referee: Andrew Kitchen

4 February 2023 30	Forest Green Rovers	0–2	Peterborough United	Nailsworth
15:00 GMT	Godwin-Malife (yellow card) 32'; O'Keeffe (yellow card) 39'; Cooper (yellow card) 51'; Onyango (yellow card) 84'	Report	Thompson (yellow card) 50'; Clarke-Harris 72' (pen.); Norris (yellow card) 90'; Kyprianou 90+5'	Stadium: The New Lawn; Attendance: 3,273; Referee: Ben Toner

11 February 2023 31	Morecambe	1–1	Forest Green Rovers	Morecambe
15:00 GMT	Stockton 89'	Report	Omotoye (yellow card) 79'; Clarke 81'; Peart-Harris (yellow card) 88'	Stadium: The Mazuma Stadium; Attendance: 4,563; Referee: Martin Coy

14 February 2023 32	Forest Green Rovers	0–1	Charlton Athletic	Nailsworth
19:45 GMT		Report	Blackett-Taylor 12'; Bonne (yellow card) 90+8'	Stadium: The New Lawn; Attendance: 2,680 (871 away); Referee: Christopher Pollard

18 February 2023 33	Ipswich Town	4–0	Forest Green Rovers	Ipswich
15:00 GMT	Chaplin 3', 60'; Broadhead 41'; Ladapo 79'		Stevenson (yellow card) 78'; Cooper (yellow card) 90+3'	Stadium: Portman Road; Attendance: 24,804; Referee: Carl Brook

25 February 2023 34	Forest Green Rovers	1–1	Lincoln City	Nailsworth
15:00 GMT	Garrick 58'; Robson (yellow card) 63'; Stevenson (yellow card) 90+6'; Peart-Harris (yellow card) 90+6'	Report	House 4'; O'Connor (yellow card) 61'; Plange (yellow card) 85'	Stadium: The New Lawn; Attendance: 2,707; Referee: Craig Hicks

5 March 2023 35	Accrington Stanley	2–1	Forest Green Rovers	Accrington
15:00 GMT	Rodgers (yellow card) 12'; Pressley 44'; Longelo 64'		Peart-Harris 22'; Casey (red card) 43'; O'Keeffe (yellow card) 45'; Robson (yellow card) 85'; Omotoye (yellow card) 90+2'	Stadium: Crown Ground; Attendance: 2,224; Referee: Declan Bourne

11 March 2023 36	Forest Green Rovers	1–3	Bristol Rovers	Nailsworth
15:00 GMT	Savage 12'; Bernard (yellow card) 81'; O'Keeffe (penalty missed) 85'		Marquis 19', 61', (yellow card) 69'; Sinclair 26'; Bogarde (yellow card) 54'; McCormick (yellow card) 81'	Stadium: The New Lawn; Attendance: 4,788; Referee: Scott Oldham

18 March 2023 37	Plymouth Argyle	2–0	Forest Green Rovers	Plymouth
15:00 GMT	Bolton 8'; Mumba 47'		O'Keeffe (yellow card) 60'	Stadium: Home Park; Attendance: 16,307; Referee: Ben Speedie

26 March 2023 38	Forest Green Rovers	1–0	Sheffield Wednesday	Nailsworth
13:00 GMT	Garrick 35'; Bunker (yellow card) 67'		James (yellow card) 48'	Stadium: The New Lawn; Attendance: 3,837; Referee: David Rock

1 April 2023 39	Portsmouth	1–0	Forest Green Rovers	Milton
15:00 BST	Lowery (yellow card) 38'; Dale (yellow card) 44', (goal) 51'; Towler (yellow card) 85'		Garrick (yellow card) 44'; Godwin-Malife (yellow card) 75'	Stadium: Fratton Park; Attendance: 17,968; Referee: Paul Howard

7 April 2023 40	Forest Green Rovers	0–2	Derby County	Nailsworth
15:00 BST	Cooper (yellow card) 7'	Report	Collins 2' (pen.); Knight (yellow card) 69'; McGoldrick 82'	Stadium: The New Lawn; Attendance: 4,117 (1,225 away); Referee: Will Finnie

10 April 2023 41	Wycombe Wanderers	2–0	Forest Green Rovers	High Wycombe
15:00 BST	Campbell 9'; Savage 52' (o.g.)		McGeouch (yellow card) 75'; Bunker (yellow card) 88'	Stadium: Adams Park; Attendance: 5,153; Referee: Carl Boyeson

15 April 2023 42	Forest Green Rovers	1–5	Barnsley	Nailsworth
15:00 BST	Brown 74'	Report	Tedić 8'; Phillips 29', (penalty missed) 52', 53'; Norwood 37', (yellow card) 50'; Cole 90'	Stadium: The New Lawn; Attendance: 3,335; Referee: Craig Hicks

18 April 2023 43	Forest Green Rovers	0–0	Fleetwood Town	Nailsworth
19:45 BST	Garrick (yellow card) 90'	Report	Rooney (yellow card) 37'; Vela (yellow card) 62'; Stockley (yellow card) 90'	Stadium: The New Lawn; Attendance: 1,716 (113 away); Referee: Sunny Gill

22 April 2023 44	Cheltenham Town	3–1	Forest Green Rovers	Cheltenham
15:00 BST	May 14', 38', (yellow card) 74'; Keena 32'; Long (yellow card) 50'; Bonds (yellow card) 71'; Freestone (yellow card) 76'	Report	Cooper (yellow card) 26'; Garrick 48'; McGeouch (yellow card) 55'	Stadium: Whaddon Road; Attendance: 5,901; Referee: Neil Hair

29 April 2023 45	Forest Green Rovers	0–3	Oxford United	Nailsworth
15:00 BST			Joseph 11'; Goodrham 46'; Bodin 68'	Stadium: The New Lawn; Attendance: 4,070 (1,224 away); Referee: Tom Reeves

7 May 2023 46	Cambridge United	2–0	Forest Green Rovers	Cambridge
12:30 BST	Dunk 25'; Smith 37'		Bunker (yellow card) 74'; Cooper (yellow card) 79'	Stadium: Abbey Stadium; Attendance: 7,493; Referee: Ben Toner

=== FA Cup ===
FGR were drawn at home to Birmingham City in the third round.

Win Draw Loss Fixtures

5 November 2022 First round	South Shields	0–2	Forest Green Rovers	Jarrow
12:00	Heaney (yellow card) 78'	Report	Wickham 28', 90+6'; Bernard (yellow card) 78'; Cagill (yellow card) 80'; Bunker (yellow card) 89'	Stadium: Mariners Park; Attendance: 3,800; Referee: Scott Oldham

26 November 2022 Second round	Forest Green Rovers	2–1	Alvechurch	Nailsworth
15:00 GMT	Bernard (yellow card) 21' (yellow-red card) 72'; Wickham 24' (pen.); Hendry (yellow card) 45'; March 51'	Report	Abbey 49' (yellow card) 90'	Stadium: The New Lawn; Attendance: 2,758; Referee: Martin Coy

7 January 2023 Third round	Forest Green Rovers	Postponed	Birmingham City	Nailsworth
15:00 GMT				Stadium: The New Lawn
Note: Fixture was postponed due to a waterlogged pitch

17 January 2023 Third round	Forest Green Rovers	1–2	Birmingham City	Nailsworth
19:45 GMT	Stevenson 8'; Peart-Harris (yellow card) 38'	Report	Longelo (yellow card) 38'; Jutkiewicz 50'; Bielik (yellow card) 57'; Mejbri (yellow card) 59'; Long 65'; Trusty (yellow card) 69'	Stadium: The New Lawn; Attendance: 3,701; Referee: Sam Allison

=== EFL Cup ===
Win Draw Loss Fixtures

FGR were drawn at home to Leyton Orient in the first round and to Brighton & Hove Albion in the second round.

9 August 2022 First round	Forest Green Rovers	2–0	Leyton Orient	Nailsworth
19:45 BST	Bernard (yellow card) 6'; Little 17', 50'; Bunker (yellow card) 78'	Report	Sweeney (yellow card) 5'; Moncur (yellow card) 34'	Stadium: The New Lawn; Attendance: 1,055; Referee: James Oldham

24 August 2022 Second round	Forest Green Rovers	0–3	Brighton & Hove Albion	Nailsworth
19:45 BST	Casey (yellow card) 64'; Stevenson (yellow card) 66'; O'Keeffe (yellow card) 77'	Report	Undav 38'; Alzate 45+1' van Hecke (yellow card) 61'; Ferguson 90+4'	Stadium: The New Lawn Stadium; Attendance: 3,812; Referee: Tim Robinson

=== EFL Trophy ===
On 20 June, the initial Group stage draw was made, grouping Forest Green Rovers with Exeter City and Newport County.

Pos	Div	Team	Pld	W	PW	PL	L	GF	GA	GD	Pts	Qualification
1	L1	Forest Green Rovers	3	3	0	0	0	9	3	+6	9	Advance to Round 2
2	L2	Newport County	3	2	0	0	1	5	4	+1	6	Advance to Round 2
3	L1	Exeter City	3	1	0	0	2	4	7	−3	3	
4	ACA	Southampton U21	3	0	0	0	3	3	7	−4	0	

Source: EFL.com

Win Draw Loss Fixtures

30 August 2022 Group stage	Forest Green Rovers	3–1	Southampton U21	Nailsworth
19:00 BST	Davis (yellow card) 19'; Cargill (yellow card) 31', (goal) 37'; Bernard 45+3'; Stevenson (yellow card) 53'; Casey 59'; Little (red card) 72'; March (yellow card) 75'	Report	Lancashire 32'; Carson (yellow card) 33'; Bellis (yellow card) 45+1'; Payne (yellow card) 90+2'	Stadium: The New Lawn; Attendance: 726; Referee: Charles Breakspear

20 September 2022 Group stage	Newport County	1–2	Forest Green Rovers	Newport
19:45 BST (UTC+1)	Collins (yellow card) 77'; Evans 90+2'	Report	Brown (yellow card) 39'; Stevenson 69'; Fiabema 79'; O'Keeffe (yellow card) 90+3'	Stadium: Rodney Parade; Attendance: 946; Referee: Lee Swabey

18 October 2022 Group stage	Forest Green Rovers	4–1	Exeter City	Nailsworth
19:00 BST	Bunker (yellow card) 7'; Matt 12'; Peart-Harris 51' (pen.); Billington 54' (o.g.); O'Keeffe 63'; Hendry (yellow card) 69'	Report	Jay 41'; King (yellow card) 68'	Stadium: The New Lawn; Attendance: 729; Referee: Sam Allison

22 November 2022 Second round	Forest Green Rovers	1–1 (3–4 p)	Cheltenham Town	Nailsworth
19:00 GMT	Peart-Harris (yellow card) 17'; March 24' (yellow card) 32'	Report	Taylor (yellow card) 32'; Broom 69'	Stadium: The New Lawn; Attendance: 1,425; Referee: Sunny Gill
	Penalties
	Peart-Harris (penalty scored); Wickham (penalty missed); O'Keeffe (penalty scored); Bunker (penalty scored); March (penalty missed)		Sercombe (penalty scored); Bonds (penalty scored); Brown (penalty scored); Broom (penalty scored)
