= Myles Peart-Harris =

English footballer

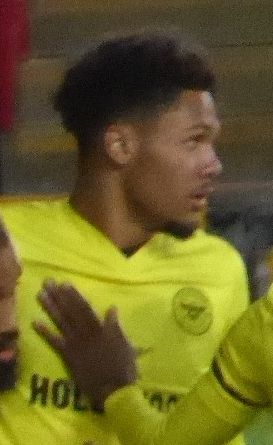
- Peart-Harris playing for Brentford in 2021

Personal information
- Full name: Myles Spencer Peart-Harris
- Date of birth: 18 September 2002 (age 24)
- Place of birth: Isleworth, England
- Height: 1.87 m (6 ft 2 in)
- Position: Attacking midfielder

Team information
- Current team: Middlesbrough
- Number: 14

Youth career
- –2010: Bedfont Green
- 2010–2021: Chelsea

Senior career*
Years	Team	Apps	(Gls)
2021–2026	Brentford	4	(0)
2022–2023	→ Forest Green Rovers (loan)	40	(5)
2024	→ Portsmouth (loan)	12	(2)
2024–2025	→ Swansea City (loan)	29	(3)
2026	Oxford United	19	(3)
2026–	Middlesbrough	6	(0)

International career
2017–2018	England U16	6	(0)
- * Club domestic league appearances and goals as of 18:15, 16 September 2026 (UTC)

Myles Spencer Peart-Harris (born 18 September 2002) is an English professional footballer who plays as an attacking midfielder for EFL Championship club Middlesbrough.

Peart-Harris is a graduate of the Chelsea Academy and transferred to Brentford in 2021. A fringe member of the first team squad until his departure in 2026, he gained experience with loans to EFL clubs Forest Green Rovers, Portsmouth and Swansea City. After a half-season spell with Oxford United, Peart-Harris transferred to Middlesbrough in 2026 . He was capped by England at U16 level.

== Club career ==
=== Chelsea ===
Peart-Harris started out in cage football and began his organised youth career with Bedfont Green at age six, before moving into the Chelsea Academy at the age of eight. He began his career as a "quick" winger or forward, before a growth spurt at age 11 led to him moving to centre back. At age 14, the Chelsea academy staff recognised Peart-Harris' potential on the ball and moved him into the midfield. Peart-Harris progressed to sign a scholarship deal at the end of the 2018–19 season and signed a professional contract in September 2019. He progressed to the Development Squad and finished the 2020–21 season as the team's joint-top scorer. Peart-Harris turned down a new contract and departed Cobham in July 2021.

=== Brentford ===
==== 2021–22 season ====
On 23 July 2021, Peart-Harris transferred to Premier League club Brentford and signed a four-year contract, with the option of a further year, for an undisclosed fee, reported to be £1.4 million. Named as a substitute in 8 matchday squads during the 2021–22 season, Peart-Harris made two appearances in cup matches. He was a part of the B team's 2021–22 London Senior Cup-winning squad and spent much of the season with the team.

==== 2022–23 season and loan to Forest Green Rovers ====
Well down the midfield pecking order following the 2022–23 pre-season, Peart-Harris joined League One club Forest Green Rovers on loan until January 2023. Following 25 appearances and four goals during the first half of the 2022–23 season, Peart-Harris' loan was extended until the end of the campaign. In the absence of captain Baily Cargill, Peart-Harris took the armband for two matches in February 2023. Peart-Harris finished the 2022–23 season (which culminated in relegation to League Two) with 47 appearances and six goals.

==== 2023–24 season and loan to Portsmouth ====
During the 2023–24 pre-season, Peart-Harris was named in Brentford's 2023 Premier League Summer Series squad and made two appearances at the tournament. Following surgery on an ankle injury, he returned to match play with the B team on 31 October 2023. During a period in which the club was suffering an injury crisis, Peart-Harris was called into 11 matchday squads between November 2023 and January 2024. He made five substitute appearances prior to his departure on loan to League One club Portsmouth for the remainder of the 2023–24 season on 22 January 2024. Peart-Harris was deployed in a variety of roles (including left midfield, defensive midfield and number 10) and ended the club's League One championship-winning season with 12 appearances and two goals.

==== 2024–25 season and loan to Swansea City ====
Ahead of the 2024–25 pre-season, Peart-Harris worked with a strength and conditioning coach and he then had a full involvement in the pre-season match programme. He made just one EFL Cup substitute appearance early in the regular season, prior to joining Championship club Swansea City on a season-long loan. Peart-Harris was predominantly deployed as a winger during his spell and by early March 2025, when he suffered a season-ending back injury, he had made 30 appearances and scored three goals. Earlier in the season, Brentford triggered the one-year option on Peart-Harris' contract.

==== 2025–26 season ====
Peart-Harris was included in the first team squad for its 2025–26 pre-season training camp in Portugal and he made two appearances during the pre-season period. He was an unused substitute on six occasions during the first half of the regular season and made what would be his final Brentford appearance as a substitute late in a 4–2 win over Everton on 4 January 2026. Five days later, Peart-Harris transferred out of the club.

=== Oxford United ===
On 9 January 2026, Peart-Harris transferred to Championship club Oxford United and signed a contract running until the end of the 2025–26 season. He made 20 appearances and scored three goals during the remainder of the season, which culminated in relegation. Peart-Harris departed the club when his contract expired.

=== Middlesbrough ===
On 3 July 2026, Peart-Harris signed a four-year contract with Championship club Middlesbrough on a free transfer.

== International career ==
Peart-Harris won six caps for England at U16 level during the 2017–18 season and he was part of the squad which finished third at the 2018 Montaigu Tournament. He was an unused substitute during England's three 2019 European U17 Championship elite round qualifying matches in March 2019, but was not named in the squad for the tournament finals. Peart-Harris was called into an U19 training camp in November 2020. He was called up to a Jamaica U23 training camp in March 2024.

== Style of play ==
Thomas Frank described Peart-Harris as "a dynamic midfield player and he drives forward with the ball. He has great quality on the ball. He can score goals and deliver assists. He is great at arriving in the penalty area at the right time". He is "comfortable receiving the ball from deep to help build up play, operating as a box-to-box midfielder or behind the striker". In 2026, Peart-Harris stated his "preference is playing as like a running number eight, a high number eight".

== Personal life ==
Peart-Harris is of Jamaican descent. He grew up in Isleworth and attended Isleworth and Syon School. As of July 2024, Peart-Harris was living in Surrey.

== Career statistics ==
As of match played 15 August 2026

Appearances and goals by club, season and competition
Club	Season	League			FA Cup		EFL Cup		Other		Total	
Club	Season	Division	Apps	Goals	Apps	Goals	Apps	Goals	Apps	Goals	Apps	Goals
Chelsea U21	2020–21	―							3 (Note: Appearances in EFL Trophy)	0	3	0
Brentford	2021–22	Premier League	0	0	1	0	1	0	―		2	0
Brentford	2023–24	Premier League	3	0	2	0	0	0	―		5	0
Brentford	2024–25	Premier League	0	0	―		1	0	―		1	0
Brentford	2025–26	Premier League	1	0	―		0	0	―		1	0
Brentford	Total		4	0	3	0	2	0	―		9	0
Forest Green Rovers (loan)	2022–23	League One	40	5	2	0	1	0	4	1	47	6
Portsmouth (loan)	2023–24	League One	12	2	―		―		―		12	2
Swansea City (loan)	2024–25	Championship	29	3	1	0	―		―		30	3
Oxford United	2025–26	Championship	19	3	1	0	―		―		20	3
Middlesbrough	2026–27	Championship	1	0	0	0	0	0	―		1	0
Career total			105	13	7	0	3	0	7	1	122	14

== Honours ==
Brentford B

- London Senior Cup: 2021–22

Portsmouth

- EFL League One: 2023–24
