= Corey O'Keeffe =

English-Irish footballer (born 1998)

Personal information
- Full name: Corey James John O'Keeffe
- Date of birth: 5 June 1998 (age 28)
- Place of birth: Birmingham, England
- Height: 1.84 m (6 ft 0 in)
- Positions: Full-back; wing-back; wide midfielder

Team information
- Current team: Bradford City
- Number: 27

Youth career
- 200?–2008: Cadbury Athletic
- 2008–2016: Birmingham City

Senior career*
Years	Team	Apps	(Gls)
2016–2020	Birmingham City	1	(0)
2018	→ Solihull Moors (loan)	13	(0)
2019–2020	→ Macclesfield Town (loan)	31	(0)
2020–2022	Mansfield Town	13	(0)
2021–2022	→ Rochdale (loan)	21	(1)
2022	Rochdale	22	(1)
2022–2023	Forest Green Rovers	41	(0)
2023–2026	Barnsley	103	(3)
2025–2026	→ Stockport County (loan)	16	(0)
2026–	Bradford City	8	(0)

International career
- Republic of Ireland U16
2014–2015	Republic of Ireland U17	8	(1)
2015–2016	Republic of Ireland U18	3	(0)
2016–2017	Republic of Ireland U19	7	(0)
- * Club domestic league appearances and goals as of 7 November 2026 (UTC)

Corey James John O'Keeffe (born 5 June 1998) is a professional footballer who plays as a full back, wing-back or wide midfielder for EFL League One club Bradford City.

O'Keeffe began his career with Birmingham City, made his senior debut in 2016, and spent time on loan at Solihull Moors of the National League in 2018 and at League Two club Macclesfield Town in 2019–20. He was released by Birmingham in 2020 and signed for Mansfield Town. After a season in which he played little, he joined another League Two club, Rochdale, initially on loan and then on a short-term contract, where he was a first-team regular. He signed for Forest Green Rovers, newly promoted to League One, in June 2022, but after they were relegated, returned to League One with Barnsley in July 2023.

O'Keeffe was born in England and represented the Republic of Ireland at levels from under-16 to under-19.

== Club career ==
=== Early life and career ===
O'Keeffe was born in Birmingham, where he attended Stirchley Primary School and Baverstock School in the Druids Heath area. He was noticed by representatives of Birmingham City when playing for Cadbury Athletic, and joined their Academy in 2008. He took up a scholarship with the club in July 2014. Interviewed later that year, he assessed his strengths as attacking and heading, and felt he needed to improve his weaker foot. O'Keeffe signed his first professional contract, of two years, in May 2016, and was an unused substitute for the Birmingham reserve team that lost the 2016 Birmingham Senior Cup final to National League North champions Solihull Moors.

=== First-team football with Birmingham City and on loan ===
After impressing both for Birmingham's under-23 side and when training with the first team, O'Keeffe was given squad number 30 in December 2016. He made his senior debut in the Championship visit to Newcastle United on 10 December, as a 74th-minute substitute in a 4–0 defeat. That was his only first-team appearance in 2016–17.

O'Keeffe signed a new three-year contract in August 2017. Having made no first-team appearances in 2017–18, he joined National League club Solihull Moors on loan until 17 February 2018. He went straight into the starting eleven for the following day's match, playing the whole of a 2–2 draw at home to Sutton United, but was not a regular selection, and was recalled in December having made only eight starts in National League matches.

An unused substitute in Birmingham's EFL Cup defeat on 6 August 2019, O'Keeffe joined League Two club Macclesfield Town three days later on loan for the rest of the season. He was a first-team regular throughout his stay, and had made 36 appearances in all competitions by the time the League Two season was first suspended and then ended early because of the COVID-19 pandemic. He was released by Birmingham when his contract expired at the end of June 2020.

=== Mansfield Town ===
O'Keeffe signed a two-year contract with League Two club Mansfield Town on 13 August 2020. He was in the starting eleven for their opening fixture, an EFL Cup tie away to Preston North End on 29 August, and played the whole of the 4–0 defeat. Playing at wing-back, he was voted man of the match in the first league match, a goalless draw with Tranmere Rovers in which he "was a constant threat down the right-hand side of the pitch with his tricky footwork and dangerous deliveries". He started the first seven league matches of the season, before having to self-isolate because of contact with a team-mate who tested positive for COVID-19. By the time he returned, Graham Coughlan, the manager who signed him, had left; his successor, Nigel Clough, switched to a flat back four, the results improved, and O'Keeffe remained a regular in the matchday squad but did not start another league game. His last appearance of the season in any competition was in the FA Cup third round defeat to Cheltenham Town, in which he played the whole 120 minutes.

=== Rochdale ===
O'Keeffe was transfer-listed at the end of the season, and on 3 August 2021, he joined divisional rivals Rochdale on loan until January 2022. He made his debut in the starting eleven for the opening-day visit to Harrogate Town, which Rochdale lost 3–2 to a stoppage-time goal, and continued as a regular. O'Keeffe scored his first senior goal on 31 August in the group stage of the 2021–22 EFL Trophy after he was fouled in the penalty area and converted the kick himself; 22 minutes later, he scored his second, this time from open play, as Rochdale went on to beat Liverpool U21 4–0. Four days later, he scored a 78th-minute winner in a 3–2 league victory away to Port Vale. O'Keeffe started every match of his loan spell, apart from the fixture against his parent club for which he was ineligible, before returning to Mansfield.

Clough's opinion was that "if we're not going to play the three centre halves then Corey may well move on", and on 28 January 2022, O'Keeffe did so, returning to Rochdale on a short-term contract until the end of the season. He played in every remaining match, although not always a starter, making 51 appearances over the season in all competitions, scoring five goals and finishing well up the League Two assists table, and Rochdale confirmed that they would be offering him a new contract.

=== Forest Green Rovers ===
On 7 June 2022, O'Keeffe became the first summer signing for Forest Green Rovers, newly promoted to League One as 2021–22 League Two champions. He was a regular in the side, playing 50 matches in all competitions as the team were relegated at the end of the season.

=== Barnsley ===
O'Keeffe signed a four-year contract with League One club Barnsley in July 2023. Despite not being fully fit, he started the opening fixture, at home to Port Vale, because Barnsley were short of players. His interception, run and cross set up the opening goal for Devante Cole in what finished as a 7–0 win, but he went off injured after 33 minutes.

On 18 July 2025, O'Keeffe joined fellow League One side Stockport County on a season-long loan deal.

=== Bradford City ===
On 1 September 2026, O'Keefe signed with fellow League One side Bradford City on a two-year contract in exchange for an undisclosed fee.

== International career ==
O'Keeffe played six matches for the Republic of Ireland U17 in qualification for the 2015 UEFA Under-17 Championship, scoring once, and started two matches in the tournament proper as his country were eliminated at the group stage.

O'Keeffe played two Ireland under-18 friendlies, against the Czech Republic in November 2015 and England in March 2016, and played alongside Birmingham teammate Ronan Hale in a 2–2 draw with Germany U18 in May. He appeared in both of Ireland under-19s' friendlies against Austria U19 in September, captaining the side in the second match, and played in two of their three 2017 UEFA Under-19 qualifying-round matches in October. The following March, he played in all three of their elite-round matches; Ireland finished second in their group so failed to qualify.

== Career statistics ==
As of end of 2025–26 season

Appearances and goals by club, season and competition
Club	Season	League			FA Cup		League Cup		Other		Total	
Club	Season	Division	Apps	Goals	Apps	Goals	Apps	Goals	Apps	Goals	Apps	Goals
Birmingham City	2016–17	Championship	1	0	0	0	0	0	—		1	0
Birmingham City	2017–18	Championship	0	0	0	0	0	0	—		0	0
Birmingham City	2018–19	Championship	0	0	—		0	0	—		0	0
Birmingham City	2019–20	Championship	0	0	—		0	0	—		0	0
Birmingham City	Total		1	0	0	0	0	0	—		1	0
Solihull Moors (loan)	2018–19	National League	13	0	2	0	—		1 (Note: Appearance in FA Trophy)	0	16	0
Macclesfield Town (loan)	2019–20	League Two	31	0	1	0	2	0	2 (Note: Appearance(s) in EFL Trophy)	0	36	0
Mansfield Town	2020–21	League Two	13	0	2	0	1	0	2	0	18	0
Mansfield Town	2021–22	League Two	0	0	0	0	—		0	0	0	0
Mansfield Town	Total		13	0	2	0	1	0	2	0	18	0
Rochdale	2021–22	League Two	43	2	3	1	2	0	3	2	51	5
Forest Green Rovers	2022–23	League One	41	0	3	0	2	0	4	1	50	1
Barnsley	2023–24	League One	39	3	2	0	0	0	4 (Note: Two appearances in EFL Trophy, two in League One play-offs)	0	45	3
Barnsley	2024–25	League One	41	0	2	0	2	0	1	0	46	0
Barnsley	2025–26	League One	23	0	1	0	—		—		24	0
Barnsley	Total		103	3	5	0	2	0	5	0	115	3
Stockport County (loan)	2025–26	League One	16	0	2	0	2	0	3	1	23	1
Career total			261	5	18	1	11	0	20	4	310	10
