= Tom Mehew =

English footballer (born 2001)

Personal information
- Full name: Thomas Samuel James Mehew
- Date of birth: 26 May 2001 (age 25)
- Place of birth: Bristol, England
- Height: 1.81 m (5 ft 11 in)
- Position: Midfielder

Team information
- Current team: Penybont
- Number: 4

Youth career
- –2020: Bristol Rovers

Senior career*
Years	Team	Apps	(Gls)
2017–2022	Bristol Rovers	1	(0)
- → Yate Town (loan)
- → Frome Town (loan)
2019–2020	→ Stratford Town (loan)	5	(0)
2020–2021	→ Bath City (loan)	7	(1)
2021	→ Bath City (loan)	2	(0)
2021–2022	→ Gloucester City (loan)	1	(0)
2022	→ Swindon Supermarine (loan)	12	(1)
2022	→ Chippenham Town (loan)	8	(1)
2022–2023	Chippenham Town	40	(0)
2023	Havant & Waterlooville	10	(0)
2023–2026	Chippenham Town	107	(10)
2026–	Penybont	14	(8)
- * Club domestic league appearances and goals as of 08:05, 8 November 2026 (UTC)

Thomas Samuel James Mehew (born 26 May 2001) is an English footballer who plays as a midfielder for Cymru Premier club Penybont.

== Career ==
=== Bristol Rovers ===
During his time in the academy at Bristol Rovers, Mehew earned a lot of praise and was U18 Player of the season for the 2018-19 season.

He made his senior debut for Bristol Rovers on 8 September 2020 against Walsall in the EFL Trophy, and scored his first professional goal in the process. Three days later on 11 September 2020, Mehew signed a new two-year contract extension with an option for a further year. On 6 October, Mehew again started in the EFL Trophy and again he opened the scoring. On 9 May 2021, Mehew came off of the bench to make his league debut in the final match of the season as already-relegated Rovers lost 1–0 to Blackpool.

Mehew was released at the end of the 2021–22 season following Rovers' promotion to League One.

==== Loan Spells ====
On 20 November 2020, Mehew joined National League South side Bath City on loan until early January, joining his young teammate from Bristol Rovers, Lucas Tomlinson. He made his debut the following day as Bath lost 1–0 late on to Hampton & Richmond Borough. On 16 January 2021, Mehew was sent off for a second bookable offence in a 1–0 defeat to league below Peterborough Sports in the FA Trophy Fourth Round, his second dismissal of his loan spell after also being sent off in a league victory over Dorking Wanderers. On 19 January 2021, he scored his first goal for the Romans, opening the scoring in a 2–1 victory over Havant & Waterlooville.

On 26 October 2021, Mehew returned to Bath City on a one-month youth loan deal.

On 10 December 2021, Mehew joined Gloucester City on a one-month loan deal. His move to the National League North side saw him link up with former Development Squad manager at Rovers, Lee Mansell.

On 11 January 2022, Mehew joined Swindon Supermarine on a one-month loan deal. In February, this was extended until the end of the season.

=== Chippenham Town ===
On 24 March 2022, Mehew was recalled from Swindon Supermarine, joining Chippenham Town the following day until the end of the season.

In July 2022, Mehew joined Chippenham Town on a permanent basis following his release from Bristol Rovers.

=== Havant & Waterlooville ===
On 2 June 2023 Havant & Waterlooville signed Mehew on a permanent deal.

=== Return to Chippenham ===
On 3 November 2023, Mehew returned to Chippenham Town.

=== Penybont ===
In May 2026, Mehew joined Cymru Premier club Penybont.

== Personal life ==
Mehew's father David Mehew was a former professional who also played for Bristol Rovers and his brother Olly was formerly in both the Bristol Rovers and Forest Green Rovers youth academy and currently plays for Merthyr Town.

== Career statistics ==
As of match played 15 May 2022

Appearances and goals by club, season and competition
Club	Season	League			National Cup		League Cup		Other		Total	
Club	Season	Division	Apps	Goals	Apps	Goals	Apps	Goals	Apps	Goals	Apps	Goals
Bristol Rovers	2019–20	League One	0	0	0	0	0	0	0	0	0	0
Bristol Rovers	2020–21	League One	1	0	0	0	0	0	2 (Note: Appearances in the EFL Trophy)	2	3	2
Bristol Rovers	2021–22	League Two	0	0	0	0	0	0	1	0	1	0
Bristol Rovers	Total		1	0	0	0	0	0	3	2	4	2
Stratford Town (loan)	2019–20	Southern Division One South	5	0	0	0	–		0	0	5	0
Bath City (loan)	2020–21	National League South	7	1	—		—		1 (Note: Appearance(s) in FA Trophy)	0	8	1
Bath City (loan)	2021–22	National League South	2	0	—		—		0	0	2	0
Gloucester City (loan)	2021–22	National League North	1	0	—		—		1	0	2	0
Swindon Supermarine (loan)	2021–22	Southern Premier Division South	12	1	—		—		3 (Note: 2 appearances in Southern League Challenge Cup and one appearance in Wiltshire Premier Shield)	0	15	1
Chippenham Town (loan)	2021–22	National League South	8	1	—		—		2 (Note: Appearance(s) in National League South play-offs)	0	10	1
Career total			36	3	0	0	0	0	10	2	46	5
