= 2020–21 Bristol Rovers F.C. season =

Bristol Rovers
2020–21 season
- President: Wael al-Qadi
- Manager: Ben Garner (until 14 November); Paul Tisdale (19 November – 10 February); Joey Barton (from 22 February)
- Stadium: Memorial Stadium
- League One: 24th (relegated)
- FA Cup: Third round
- EFL Cup: First round
- EFL Trophy: Third round
- Top goalscorer: League: Luke Leahy (8); All: Luke Leahy (10)
Home colours	Away colours

The 2020–21 Bristol Rovers F.C. season was the 138th edition in Bristol Rovers F.C. history and the fourth consecutive season in EFL League One, Along with League One, the club contested the FA Cup, EFL Cup and EFL Trophy.

The season covered the period from 1 July 2020 to 30 June 2021.

== Transfers ==
=== Transfers in ===
Date	Pos.	Nat.	Name	From	Fee	Ref.
18 July 2020	CB	(England)	Josh Grant	(England) Chelsea	Free transfer	
20 July 2020	CB	(England)	Jack Baldwin	(England) Sunderland	Free transfer	
21 July 2020	CB	(Germany)	Max Ehmer	(England) Gillingham	Free transfer	
22 July 2020	LW	(Scotland)	Sam Nicholson	(United States) Colorado Rapids	Free transfer	
29 July 2020	CF	(Kenya)	Jonah Ayunga	(England) Havant & Waterlooville	Undisclosed	
3 August 2020	CM	(England)	Zain Westbrooke	(England) Coventry City	Undisclosed	
25 August 2020	CB	(Wales)	Pablo Martinez	(England) West Bromwich Albion	Free transfer	
28 August 2020	LB	(Democratic Republic of the Congo)	David Tutonda	(England) Barnet	Free transfer	
10 September 2020	CF	(England)	Brandon Hanlan	(England) Gillingham	Free transfer	
8 October 2020	CM	(England)	Ben Liddle	(England) Middlesbrough	Undisclosed	
16 October 2020	LW	(England)	Ryan Jones	(England) Weston-Super-Mare	Undisclosed	
22 October 2020	LB	(England)	Ali Koiki	(England) Burnley	Free transfer	
21 January 2021	RB	(England)	George Williams	(England) Milton Keynes Dons	Undisclosed	

=== Loans in ===
Date from	Pos.	Nat.	Name	From	Date until	Ref.
8 August 2020	AM	(England)	Jayden Mitchell-Lawson	(England) Derby County	17 December 2020	
21 September 2020	CM	(England)	Luke McCormick	(England) Chelsea	End of season	
15 October 2020	AM	(Turkey)	Erhun Oztumer	(England) Charlton Athletic	End of season	
4 January 2021	GK	(England)	Joe Day	(Wales) Cardiff City	End of season	

=== Loans out ===
Date from	Pos.	Nat.	Name	To	Date until	Ref.
11 September 2020	GK	(England)	Liam Armstrong	(England) Salisbury	21 October 2020	
11 September 2020	CF	(England)	Ollie Hulbert	(Wales) Cardiff Metropolitan University	1 January 2021	
11 September 2020	CF	(England)	Harry Warwick	(Wales) Cardiff Metropolitan University	1 January 2021	
8 October 2020	LW	(England)	Kyle Bennett	(England) Grimsby Town	End of season	
9 October 2020	CF	(England)	Kieran Phillips	(England) Chippenham Town	1 January 2021	
13 October 2020	CM	(England)	Lucas Tomlinson	(England) Bath City	2 January 2021	
16 October 2020	LW	(England)	Ryan Jones	(England) Weston-Super-Mare	End of Season	
21 October 2020	GK	(France)	Alexis André Jr.	(England) Salisbury	9 January 2021	
23 October 2020	CB	(Wales)	Pablo Martinez	(England) Oxford City	23 January 2021	
23 October 2020	CM	(England)	Abu Ogogo	(England) Dagenham & Redbridge	11 January 2021	
24 October 2020	LB	(England)	Sam Heal	(England) Melksham Town		
31 October 2020	DF	(Wales)	Luca Hoole	(England) Taunton Town	December 2020	
20 November 2020	CM	(England)	Tom Mehew	(England) Bath City	9 January 2021	
18 January 2021	CB	(England)	Tom Davies	(England) Barrow	End of Season	
26 January 2021	LB	(Scotland)	Michael Kelly	(England) Yeovil Town	End of Season	
24 April 2021	CM	(England)	Lucas Tomlinson	(England) Torquay United	End of Season	

=== Transfers out ===
Date	Pos.	Nat.	Name	To	Fee	Ref.
1 July 2020	DF	(England)	Josh Bailey	Unattached	Released	
1 July 2020	CM	(England)	Ollie Clarke	(England) Mansfield Town	Free transfer	
1 July 2020	CM	(Wales)	Lewis Clutton	(Wales) Pen-y-Bont	Released	
1 July 2020	CB	(England)	Tony Craig	(England) Crawley Town	Released	
1 July 2020	FW	(England)	Isaiah Crawford	Unattached	Released	
1 July 2020	MF	(England)	George Fowler	Unattached	Released	
1 July 2020	LB	(England)	Tareiq Holmes-Dennis	Retired	Released	
1 July 2020	CF	(England)	Rhys Kavanagh	Retired	Released	
1 July 2020	CM	(England)	Samuel Matthews	(England) Crawley Town	Released	
1 July 2020	DF	(Wales)	Ben Morgan	Unattached	Released	
1 July 2020	CF	(England)	Tom Nichols	(England) Crawley Town	Released	
1 July 2020	DF	(Wales)	Luc Noble	Unattached	Released	
1 July 2020	DF	(England)	Levi Paul	Unattached	Released	
1 July 2020	MF	(England)	Mason Raymond	Unattached	Released	
1 July 2020	CF	(Scotland)	Gavin Reilly	(England) Carlisle United	Released	
1 July 2020	CM	(England)	Liam Sercombe	(England) Cheltenham Town	Released	
1 July 2020	GK	(England)	Harry Thomas-Barker	(Wales) Barry Town United	Released	
1 July 2020	CM	(England)	Theo Widdrington	(England) Lewes	Released	
16 July 2020	RB	(England)	Harry Hodges	(England) Dorchester Town	Free transfer	
28 July 2020	CB	(Wales)	Rollin Menayese	(England) Mansfield Town	Undisclosed	
3 August 2020	CM	(England)	Luke Russe	(England) Chippenham Town	Free transfer	
27 August 2020	CF	(England)	Jonson Clarke-Harris	(England) Peterborough United	Undisclosed	

== Pre-season ==
Rovers announced their first pre-season game on 7 August 2020 that would see the first-team play the following day in a behind closed doors friendly against Bristol Manor Farm. They later announced a second fixture against Exeter City.

8 August 2020 Friendly	Bristol Manor Farm	0–4	Bristol Rovers	Bristol
12:00 BST		Report	Clarke-Harris 5'; Walker 19', 44'; Tomlinson 64'	Stadium: The Creek; Attendance: N/A

15 August 2020 Friendly	Bristol Rovers	2–1	Exeter City	Horfield
14:00 BST	Mitchell-Lawson 3'; Hargreaves 46'	Report	Parkes 50'	Stadium: Memorial Stadium; Attendance: N/A

21 August 2020 Friendly	Newport County	1–1	Bristol Rovers	Newport
	Abrahams	Report	Hare	Stadium: Dragon Park; Attendance: N/A

22 August 2020 Friendly	Forest Green Rovers	4–3	Bristol Rovers	Chippenham
13:00 BST	Cadden 20'; Wilson 34'; Adams 63'; Winchester 67'	Report	Clarke-Harris 56', 85'; Westbrooke 65'	Stadium: Stanley Park Training Ground; Attendance: N/A

25 August 2020 Friendly	Cheltenham Town	0–2	Bristol Rovers	Cheltenham
19:45 BST		Report	Trialist (Tutonda) 45'; Leahy 73' (pen.)	Stadium: Jonny-Rocks Stadium; Attendance: N/A

28 August 2020 Friendly	Bristol Rovers	1–2	Cardiff City	Horfield
18:00 BST	Tomlinson 105'	Report	Flint 88'; Glatzel 125'	Stadium: Memorial Stadium; Attendance: N/A

== Competitions ==
=== EFL League One ===
==== League table ====
Pos	Team	Pld	W	D	L	GF	GA	GD	Pts	Promotion, qualification or relegation
17	Shrewsbury Town	46	13	15	18	50	57	−7	54	
18	Plymouth Argyle	46	14	11	21	53	80	−27	53	
19	AFC Wimbledon	46	12	15	19	54	70	−16	51	
20	Wigan Athletic	46	13	9	24	54	77	−23	48	
21	Rochdale (R)	46	11	14	21	61	78	−17	47	Relegation to EFL League Two
22	Northampton Town (R)	46	11	12	23	41	67	−26	45	Relegation to EFL League Two
23	Swindon Town (R)	46	13	4	29	55	89	−34	43	Relegation to EFL League Two
24	Bristol Rovers (R)	46	10	8	28	40	70	−30	38	Relegation to EFL League Two

Source: EFL Official Website
Rules for classification: 1) Points; 2) Goal difference; 3) Number of goals scored; 4) Head-to-head results; 5) Wins; 6) Away goals; 7) Penalty points (sec 9.5); 8) 12-point sending off offences
(R) Relegated

==== Results summary ====
Overall								Home						Away					
Pld	W	D	L	GF	GA	GD	Pts	W	D	L	GF	GA	GD	W	D	L	GF	GA	GD
46	10	8	28	40	70	−30	38	7	2	14	23	32	−9	3	6	14	17	38	−21

Last updated: 9 May 2021.
Source: BBC

==== Results by matchday ====
Matchday	1	2	3	4	5	6	7	8	9	10	11	12	13	14	15	16	17	18	19	20	21	22	23	24	25	26	27	28	29	30	31	32	33	34	35	36	37	38	39	40	41	42	43	44	45	46
Ground	A	H	A	H	A	H	A	H	A	H	H	A	A	H	A	H	A	H	H	A	A	A	H	A	A	H	H	A	H	H	A	A	H	H	A	A	H	H	A	H	A	H	H	A	H	A
Result	D	L	L	W	W	D	W	L	D	L	L	L	D	L	W	W	L	W	L	L	L	D	L	L	D	L	W	L	L	W	L	L	W	D	L	L	L	L	L	W	D	L	L	L	L	L
Position	11	20	24	15	12	12	10	13	13	15	18	21	21	21	19	15	20	18	19	19	19	19	19	20	20	20	18	19	21	19	20	21	19	19	19	20	21	23	23	21	22	23	24	24	24	24

Updated to match(es) played on 9 May 2021. Source: 11v11 for league tables and fixtures
A = Away; H = Home; W = Win; D = Draw; L = Loss

==== Matches ====
Win Draw Loss Postponed

The 2020–21 season fixtures were released on 21 August.

12 September 2020 1	Sunderland	1–1	Bristol Rovers	Sunderland
15:00 BST	Wright (yellow card) 21'; Maguire 82'; Dobson (red card) 90+6'	Report	Leahy 3' (pen.); Jaakkola (yellow card) 90+5'	Stadium: Stadium of Light; Attendance: 0 Referee: Anthony Backhouse

19 September 2020 2	Bristol Rovers	0–2	Ipswich Town	Horfield
15:00 BST	Upson (yellow card) 42'; Grant (yellow card) 90+1'	Report	Norwood (yellow card) 53'; Edwards (yellow card) 66'; Ehmer 80' (o.g.); Nolan 89'	Stadium: Memorial Stadium; Attendance: 0 Referee: Craig Hicks

26 September 2020 3	Doncaster Rovers	4–1	Bristol Rovers	Doncaster
15:00 BST	James (yellow card) 16'; Wright 23'; Whiteman (yellow card) 28'; Gomes 30'; Richards 57'; Taylor 62'	Report	Harries (yellow card) 22'; Ehmer (yellow card) 29'; Leahy 32'; Tutonda (yellow card) 86'	Stadium: Keepmoat Stadium; Attendance: 0 Referee: Trevor Kettle

3 October 2020 4	Bristol Rovers	2–0	Northampton Town	Horfield
15:00 BST	Grant (yellow card) 23'; Hanlan 54' (pen.); Baldwin 79'	Report	Racic (yellow card) 12'; Martin (yellow card) 36' (yellow-red card) 60'; Watson (yellow card) 82'; Bolger (yellow card) 90+4'	Stadium: Memorial Stadium; Attendance: 0 Referee: Sam Purkiss

10 October 2020 5	Lincoln City	1–2	Bristol Rovers	Lincoln
15:00 BST	Baldwin 46' (o.g.); Jackson (yellow card) 61' (yellow-red card) 83'; Bridcutt (yellow card) 87'	Report	Daly 48'; Hanlan 58' (pen.); Nicholson (yellow card) 90+5'; Tutonda (yellow card) 90+8'	Stadium: Sincil Bank; Attendance: 0 Referee: Jeremy Simpson

17 October 2020 6	Bristol Rovers	1–1	Burton Albion	Horfield
15:00 BST	Daly 52'; Ehmer (yellow card) 72'	Report	O'Toole (yellow card) 18'; Quinn (yellow card) 33'; Fox (yellow card) 35'; Hemmings 79'	Stadium: Memorial Stadium; Attendance: 0 Referee: Charles Breakspear

20 October 2020 7	Shrewsbury Town	0–1	Bristol Rovers	Shrewsbury
18:00 BST	Walker (yellow card) 37'	Report	Hanlan 15'; Grant (yellow card) 57'; Harries (yellow card) 66'	Stadium: New Meadow; Attendance: 0 Referee: Alan Young

24 October 2019	Accrington Stanley	v	Bristol Rovers	Accrington
15:00 GMT		Report		Stadium: Crown Ground
Note: The match was postponed on 22 October 2020 after a number of positive cases for Covid-19 within the Accrington Stanley squad.

27 October 2020 8	Bristol Rovers	1–3	Hull City	Horfield
19:00 BST	Daly 2'; McCormick (yellow card) 26'; Oztumer (yellow card) 89'; Baldwin (yellow card) 90+2'	Report	Emmanuel (yellow card) 18'; Lewis-Potter 63'; Slater 76'; Honeyman (yellow card) 88'; Elder (yellow card) 90+3'; Eaves 90+5'	Stadium: Memorial Stadium; Attendance: 0 Referee: Brett Huxtable

31 October 2020 9	Rochdale	1–1	Bristol Rovers	Rochdale
15:00 BST	Newby 25'; Rathbone (yellow card) 50'; Lund (yellow card) 80'; O'Connell (yellow card) 90'	Report	Nicholson 9'; Grant (yellow card) 34'	Stadium: Spotland Stadium; Attendance: 0 Referee: Stephen Martin

3 November 2020 10	Bristol Rovers	0–2	Peterborough United	Horfield
19:00 GMT	Ehmer (yellow card) 38'; Hare (yellow card) 77'	Report	Taylor 42'; Brown (yellow card) 52'; Butler 64'	Stadium: Memorial Stadium; Attendance: 0 Referee: Lee Swabey

14 November 2020 11	Bristol Rovers	1–4	Fleetwood Town	Horfield
15:00 GMT	Harries (yellow card) 27'; Grant 60'; Ehmer (yellow card) 80'; Hanlan (yellow card) 90+1'	Report	Camps 30', 82'; Madden 39' (yellow card) 70'; Edwards (yellow card) 43'; Evans 86' (pen.); Leutwiler (yellow card) 90'	Stadium: Memorial Stadium; Attendance: 0 Referee: Anthony Coggins

21 November 2020 12	Swindon Town	1–0	Bristol Rovers	Swindon
15:00 GMT	Donohue (yellow card) 38'; Grounds (yellow card) 62'; Odimayo (yellow card) 64'; Pitman 76'	Report	Nicholson (yellow card) 78'; Upson (yellow card) 90+1'	Stadium: County Ground; Attendance: 0 Referee: Thomas Bramall

24 November 2020 13	Wigan Athletic	0–0	Bristol Rovers	Wigan
19:00 GMT	Tilt (yellow card) 61'; Merrie (yellow card) 72'; Perry (yellow card) 88'	Report	Hare (yellow card) 76'	Stadium: DW Stadium; Attendance: 0 Referee: James Bell

2 December 2020 14	Bristol Rovers	0–2	Gillingham	Horfield
19:00 GMT		Report	Oliver 26', 75'	Stadium: Memorial Stadium; Attendance: 0 Referee: Scott Oldham

5 December 2020 15	AFC Wimbledon	2–4	Bristol Rovers	Wimbledon
15:00 GMT	Pigott 5' (pen.); Nightingale (yellow card) 11'; Heneghan 30'; Guinness-Walker (yellow card) 50'	Report	Nicholson 14', 64'; Hanlan 25', 45+1'	Stadium: Plough Lane; Attendance: 0 Referee: Benjamin Speedie

12 December 2020 16	Bristol Rovers	3–0	Plymouth Argyle	Horfield
15:00 GMT	Kilgour 7'; McCormick 26'; Upson (yellow card) 68'; Westbrooke 85'	Report	Watts (yellow card) 40'; Fornah (yellow card) 45+2'	Stadium: Memorial Stadium; Attendance: 0 Referee: Carl Boyeson

15 December 2020	Charlton Athletic	v	Bristol Rovers	Charlton
19:45 GMT		Report		Stadium: The Valley
Note: The match was postponed on 15 December 2020, following a positive test in the Bristol Rovers camp.

19 December 2020	Bristol Rovers	v	Oxford United	Horfield
15:00 GMT		Report		Stadium: Memorial Stadium
Note: The match was postponed on 15 December 2020, following a positive test in the Bristol Rovers camp.

26 December 2020 17	Milton Keynes Dons	2–0	Bristol Rovers	Denbigh, Bletchley
15:00 GMT	Gladwin 45+3' (yellow card) 47'; Fraser 63'	Report	McCormick (yellow card) 85'	Stadium: Stadium MK; Attendance: 0 Referee: James Oldham

29 December 2020	Bristol Rovers	v	Portsmouth	Horfield
19:00 GMT		Report		Stadium: Memorial Stadium
Note: The match was postponed on 23 December 2020, following a number of positive cases in the Portsmouth squad.

2 January 2021 18	Bristol Rovers	2–1	Blackpool	Horfield
15:00 GMT	Hanlan 34'; Nicholson 36'; Ehmer (yellow card) 64'; Leahy (yellow card) 87'	Report	Madine 9'	Stadium: Memorial Stadium; Attendance: 0 Referee: Ollie Yates

16 January 2021 19	Bristol Rovers	0–1	Charlton Athletic	Horfield
15:00 GMT		Report	Oshilaja (yellow card) 61'; Millar 64'; Morgan (yellow card) 74' (yellow-red card) 85'	Stadium: Memorial Stadium; Attendance: 0 Referee: Peter Wright

19 January 2021 20	Crewe Alexandra	3–2	Bristol Rovers	Crewe
19:00 GMT	Kirk 4'; Wintle 23'; Finney (yellow card) 31'; Offord (yellow card) 45'; Lancashire 55'; Johnson (yellow card) 86'	Report	McCormick (yellow card) 45+4' (goal) 51'; Ehmer 47'; Harries (yellow card) 58'	Stadium: Gresty Road; Attendance: 0 Referee: Martin Coy

23 January 2021 21	Oxford United	2–0	Bristol Rovers	Oxford
15:00 GMT	Taylor 32', (yellow card) 60', (goal) 73'; Winnall (yellow card) 90+8'	Report	Leahy (yellow card) 27'; Grant (yellow card) 90+3'	Stadium: The Kassam Stadium; Attendance: 0 Referee: David Rock

26 January 2021 22	Peterborough United	0–0	Bristol Rovers	Peterborough
19:00 GMT	Thompson (yellow card) 52'; Beevers (yellow card) 82'	Report	Kilgour (yellow card) 83'; Ogogo (yellow card) 84'; Leahy (yellow card) 87'	Stadium: London Road Stadium; Attendance: 0 Referee: Graham Salisbury

30 January 2021 23	Bristol Rovers	1–2	Rochdale	Horfield
15:00 GMT	Leahy 34'	Report	Newby 16', 64'; Dooley (yellow card) 75'	Stadium: Memorial Stadium; Attendance: 0 Referee: Declan Bourne

2 February 2021 24	Accrington Stanley	6–1	Bristol Rovers	Accrington
19:30 GMT	Pritchard (yellow card) 7', (goal) 8'; Charles 12', 17', 70'; Bishop 28', 48'; McConville (yellow card) 44'	Report	Nicholson 11'; Williams (yellow card) 61'	Stadium: Crown Ground; Attendance: 0 Referee: Carl Boyeson

6 February 2021 25	Fleetwood Town	0–0	Bristol Rovers	Fleetwood
15:00 GMT	Batty (yellow card) 20'	Report	Ehmer (yellow card) 63'	Stadium: Highbury Stadium; Attendance: 0 Referee: Sebastian Stockbridge

9 February 2021 26	Bristol Rovers	0–2	Oxford United	Horfield
19:00 GMT	Ayunga (yellow card) 90'	Report	Lee 29'; Sykes (yellow card) 82'; Barker 90+2'; Brannagan (yellow card) 90+7'	Stadium: Memorial Stadium; Attendance: 0 Referee: Lee Swabey

13 February 2021	Bristol Rovers	v	Swindon Town	Horfield
15:00 GMT		Report		Stadium: Memorial Stadium; Attendance: 0
Note: Match postponed on morning of 13 February due to a failed pitch inspection on account of a frozen pitch.

16 February 2021 27	Bristol Rovers	3–1	Portsmouth	Horfield
19:00 GMT	McCormick (yellow card) 6'; Williams (yellow card) 27'; Ayunga 34', 44'; Leahy 70' (pen.)	Report	Marquis 26'; Johnson (yellow card) 66'; Raggett (yellow card) 69'	Stadium: Memorial Stadium; Attendance: 0 Referee: Christopher Sarginson

20 February 2021 28	Gillingham	2–0	Bristol Rovers	Gillingham
13:00 GMT	Akinde 67', 90+1'	Report	Hanlan (yellow card) 52'; Ayunga (yellow card) 70'; McCormick (yellow card) 84'; Baldwin (yellow card) 89'	Stadium: Priestfield Stadium; Attendance: 0 Referee: James Oldham

23 February 2021 29	Bristol Rovers	1–2	Wigan Athletic	Horfield
19:00 GMT	McCormick 69'	Report	Wootton (yellow card) 25' (goal) 90+5'; Lang 51'; Robinson (yellow card) 59'; Massey (yellow card) 88'	Stadium: Memorial Stadium; Attendance: 0 Referee: Carl Brook

27 February 2021 30	Bristol Rovers	2–1	Shrewsbury Town	Horfield
15:00 GMT	Leahy 45'; Hanlan 60'	Report	Ebanks-Landell (yellow card) 70'; Udoh 90+2'	Stadium: Memorial Stadium; Attendance: 0 Referee: Paul Howard

2 March 2021 31	Burton Albion	1–0	Bristol Rovers	Burton upon Trent
19:00 GMT	Clare (yellow card) 43'; Smith 55'; Carter (yellow card) 90+3'; Hemmings (yellow card) 90+6'	Report	McCormick (yellow card) 11' (yellow-red card) 52'	Stadium: Pirelli Stadium; Attendance: 0 Referee: Charles Breakspear

6 March 2021 32	Hull City	2–0	Bristol Rovers	Kingston upon Hull
15:00 GMT	Whyte 32', 60'; Honeyman (yellow card) 68'; Greaves (yellow card) 80'; Eaves (yellow card) 85'	Report	Rodman (yellow card) 58'; Leahy (yellow card) 68'	Stadium: KCOM Stadium; Attendance: 0 Referee: Sam Purkiss

9 March 2021 33	Bristol Rovers	4–1	Accrington Stanley	Horfield
19:00 GMT	Leahy 15'; Rodman 45+1'; Nicholson 67'; Westbrooke 68'; McCormick (yellow card) 78'	Report	Barclay (yellow card) 35'; Smyth 77'	Stadium: Memorial Stadium; Attendance: 0 Referee: James Bell

13 March 2021 34	Bristol Rovers	0–0	AFC Wimbledon	Horfield
15:00 GMT	Upson (yellow card) 41'; Daly (yellow card) 90'	Report	Guinness-Walker (yellow card) 22'; Johnson (yellow card) 23'; Woodyard (yellow card) 47'; Pigott (yellow card) 55'	Stadium: Memorial Stadium; Attendance: 0 Referee: Sam Barrott

16 March 2021 35	Charlton Athletic	3–2	Bristol Rovers	Chalton
19:00 GMT	Shinnie 33', (yellow card) 73'; Forster-Caskey 42'; Washington 84'; Morgan (yellow card) 86'	Report	Leahy 18' (pen.); Upson 32', (yellow card) 47'; Hargreaves (yellow card) 78'; Day (red card) 90+3'	Stadium: The Valley; Attendance: 0 Referee: Bobby Madley

20 March 2021 36	Plymouth Argyle	2–0	Bristol Rovers	Plymouth
15:00 GMT	Ennis 7', 45', (yellow card) 18'; Opoku (yellow card) 39'; Lewis (yellow card) 75'	Report		Stadium: Home Park; Attendance: 0 Referee: Trevor Kettle

23 March 2021 37	Bristol Rovers	0–1	Swindon Town	Horfield
19:00 GMT	Upson (yellow card) 21'; Williams (yellow card) 76'	Report	Payne 71'	Stadium: Memorial Stadium; Attendance: 0 Referee: Andy Woolmer

27 March 2021 38	Bristol Rovers	0–1	Sunderland	Horfield
15:00 GMT	Leahy (yellow card) 36'	Report	O'Brien 39'; Scowen (yellow card) 50'; Sanderson (yellow card) 53'; O'Nien (yellow card) 85'	Stadium: Memorial Stadium; Attendance: 0 Referee: Ollie Yates

2 April 2021 39	Ipswich Town	2–1	Bristol Rovers	Ipswich
15:00 BST	Leahy 1' (o.g.); Judge 11'; Holý (yellow card) 23'; Drinan (yellow card) 65'	Report	McCormick 18'; Oztumer (yellow card) 77'	Stadium: Portman Road; Attendance: 0 Referee: Stephen Martin

5 April 2021 40	Bristol Rovers	2–1	Doncaster Rovers	Horfield
15:00 BST	McCormick 37', 56', (yellow card) 87'; Baldwin (yellow card) 67'; Hanlan (yellow card) 90+6'	Report	Coppinger 13'; Bogle (yellow card) 49'; Greaves (yellow card) 90+3'	Stadium: Memorial Stadium; Attendance: 0 Referee: Anthony Coggins

10 April 2021 41	Northampton Town	1–1	Bristol Rovers	Northampton
15:00 BST	Morris (yellow card) 44'; Hoskins 78' (pen.), (yellow card) 83'	Report	Leahy 19'	Stadium: Sixfields Stadium; Attendance: 0 Referee: David Rock

17 April 2021 42	Bristol Rovers	0–1	Lincoln City	Horfield
12:30 BST	Upson (red card) 36'; Jaakkola (yellow card) 51'; Leahy (yellow card) 52'; Baldwin (yellow card) 90+8'	Report	Scully 16'; Edun (yellow card) 37'; Johnson (yellow card) 37'; Poole (yellow card) 90'	Stadium: Memorial Stadium; Attendance: 0 Referee: Will Finnie
Note: Originally scheduled to be played at 3PM, all EFL matches were rearranged away from this time to avoid clashing with the funeral of Prince Philip, Duke of Edinburgh.

20 April 2021 43	Bristol Rovers	0–2	Milton Keynes Dons	Horfield
19:00 BST	Rodman (yellow card) 42'; McCormick (yellow card) 70'; Martinez (yellow card) 85'; Kilgour (yellow card) 90+1'	Report	Fraser 17'; Sorinola (yellow card) 45'; Kasumu (yellow card) 55'; Grigg 60'; Fisher (yellow card) 78'	Stadium: Memorial Stadium; Attendance: 0 Referee: James Oldham

24 April 2021 44	Portsmouth	1–0	Bristol Rovers	Portsmouth
13:00 BST	Curtis 37'	Report		Stadium: Fratton Park; Attendance: 0 Referee: Thomas Bramall
Note: This loss confirmed Rovers' relegation to League Two

1 May 2021 45	Bristol Rovers	0–1	Crewe Alexandra	Horfield
15:00 BST	Baldwin (yellow card) 40'	Report	Ainley 18'	Stadium: Memorial Stadium; Attendance: 0 Referee: Craig Hicks

9 May 2021 46	Blackpool	1–0	Bristol Rovers	Blackpool
12:00 BST	Holmes (yellow card) 18'; Simms 75'	Report	Harries (yellow card) 13'; Hargreaves (yellow card) 25'; Baldwin (yellow card) 31'; Tutonda (yellow card) 55'	Stadium: Bloomfield Road; Attendance: 0 Referee: Charles Breakspear

=== FA Cup ===
The draw for the first round was made on Monday 26, October. The second round draw was revealed on Monday, 9 November by Danny Cowley. The third round draw was made on 30 November, with Premier League and EFL Championship clubs all entering the competition.

Win Draw Loss

7 November 2020 First round	Walsall	1–2	Bristol Rovers	Walsall
15:00 BST	Jules (yellow card) 4'; Lavery 87'	Report	Baldwin 33'; Hanlan 39'; Kilgour (yellow card) 47'; Jaakkola (yellow card) 90+4'	Stadium: Bescot Stadium; Attendance: 0 Referee: Ross Joyce

29 November 2020 Second round	Bristol Rovers	6–0	Darlington	Horfield
13:30 GMT	Daly 29'; Hare 38'; Leahy 44' (pen.), 53' (pen.); Oztumer 45+2'; Nicholson 59'	Report	Rivers (yellow card) 52'; Hatfield (yellow card) 69'	Stadium: Memorial Stadium; Attendance: 0 Referee: Brett Huxtable

9 January 2021 Third round	Bristol Rovers	2–3	Sheffield United	Horfield
15:00 GMT	Kilgour 21'; Leahy (yellow card) 60'; Ehmer 62'	Report	Day 6' (o.g.); Burke 59'; Bogle 63'	Stadium: Memorial Stadium; Attendance: 0 Referee: Keith Stroud

=== EFL Cup ===
On 18 August 2020, the first round was drawn.

Win Draw Loss

5 September 2020 First round	Ipswich Town	3–0	Bristol Rovers	Ipswich
15:00 BST	Dozzell (yellow card) 24'; Sears 29', 68'; Chambers 44'; Woolfenden (yellow card) 73'	Report	Grant (yellow card) 86'	Stadium: Portman Road; Attendance: 0 Referee: Will Finnie

=== EFL Trophy ===
Win Draw Loss

The regional group stage draw was confirmed on 18 August. The second round draw was made by Matt Murray on 20 November, at St Andrew's. The third round was made on 10 December 2020 by Jon Parkin.

Pos	Div	Team	Pld	W	PW	PL	L	GF	GA	GD	Pts	Qualification
1	L1	Oxford United	3	2	1	0	0	4	2	+2	8	Advance to Round 2
2	L1	Bristol Rovers	3	1	0	2	0	7	6	+1	5	Advance to Round 2
3	L2	Walsall	3	0	1	1	1	3	4	−1	3	
4	ACA	Chelsea U21	3	0	1	0	2	5	7	−2	2	

Source: EFL.com

8 September 2020 Group stage	Bristol Rovers	2–2 (2–4 p)	Walsall	Horfield
19:45 BST	Mehew 16'; Ayunga 71'	Report	Jules 29'; Gordon 63'	Stadium: Memorial Stadium; Attendance: 0 Referee: Brett Huxtable
	Penalties
	Kelly (penalty missed); Harries (penalty missed); Ayunga (penalty scored); Hare (penalty scored)		Norman (penalty scored); McDonald (penalty scored); Holden (penalty missed); Lavery (penalty scored); Gordon (penalty scored)

6 October 2020 Group stage	Oxford United	1–1 (4–3 p)	Bristol Rovers	Oxford
19:00 BST	Brannagan (yellow card) 74'; Osei 89'	Report	Mehew 11'; Baldwin (yellow card) 61'	Stadium: Kassam Stadium; Attendance: 0 Referee: Neil Hair
	Penalties
	Osei (penalty scored): Agyei (penalty missed); McGuane (penalty scored); Hall (penalty scored); Brannagan (penalty scored)		Leahy (penalty scored); Upson (penalty missed); Hare (penalty scored); Hargreaves (penalty scored); Baldwin (penalty missed)

18 November 2020 Group stage	Bristol Rovers	4–3	Chelsea U21	Horfield
18:00 BST	Hanlan 9'; Nicholson 15'; Westbrooke 57'; Kilgour (yellow card) 61'; Grant (yellow card) 88'; Hare 90'	Report	Anjorin 10', 68'; Lewis 63'	Stadium: Memorial Stadium; Attendance: 0 Referee: Christopher Pollard

8 December 2020 Second round	Leyton Orient	1–2	Bristol Rovers	Leyton
19:00 GMT	Baldwin 26' (o.g.); Turley (red card) 54'	Report	Koiki 12'; Sargeant 29' (o.g.); Upson (yellow card) 77'	Stadium: Brisbane Road; Attendance: 574; Referee: Alan Young

12 January 2021 Third round	Bristol Rovers	0–1	AFC Wimbledon	Horfield
19:00 GMT	Ogogo (yellow card) 52'	Report	Rudoni 60'; Oksanen (yellow card) 86'	Stadium: Memorial Stadium; Attendance: 0 Referee: John Busby

== Statistics ==
Players with squad numbers struck through and marked † left the club during the playing season.
Players with names in italics and marked * were on loan from another club for the whole of their season with Bristol Rovers.

As of match played 9 May 2021

No.	Pos	Nat	Player	Total		League One		FA Cup		League Cup		League Trophy	
No.	Pos	Nat	Player	Apps	Goals	Apps	Goals	Apps	Goals	Apps	Goals	Apps	Goals
1	GK	(Netherlands) NED	Jordi van Stappershoef	13	0	6+2	0	0+0	0	1+0	0	3+1	0
2	DF	(England) ENG	Mark Little	7	0	2+3	0	0+0	0	1+0	0	1+0	0
3	DF	(England) ENG	Luke Leahy	44	10	37+1	8	2+0	2	1+0	0	2+1	0
4	MF	(England) ENG	Josh Grant	39	1	31+1	1	1+2	0	1+0	0	2+1	0
5	DF	(Germany) GER	Max Ehmer	33	2	27+1	1	3+0	1	1+0	0	1+0	0
6	DF	(England) ENG	Ed Upson	33	1	20+6	1	2+0	0	0+1	0	3+1	0
7	MF	(England) ENG	Ben Liddle	6	0	1+2	0	1+1	0	0+0	0	0+1	0
8	MF	(England) ENG	Zain Westbrooke	49	3	33+9	2	2+1	0	1+0	0	2+1	1
9	FW	(England) ENG	Brandon Hanlan	48	9	40+4	7	2+0	1	0+0	0	2+0	1
~~10~~ †	FW	(England) ENG	Jayden Mitchell-Lawson*	7	0	3+2	0	0+0	0	1+0	0	0+1	0
11	MF	(Scotland) SCO	Sam Nicholson	34	8	22+7	6	2+0	1	1+0	0	2+0	1
13	GK	(England) ENG	Joe Day*	20	0	18+0	0	1+0	0	0+0	0	1+0	0
14	MF	(England) ENG	Luke McCormick *	42	6	36+3	6	3+0	0	0+0	0	0+0	0
15	DF	(England) ENG	Alfie Kilgour	44	2	33+2	1	2+1	1	1+0	0	5+0	0
17	FW	(England) ENG	James Daly	32	4	13+15	3	1+0	1	0+0	0	2+1	0
20	MF	(England) ENG	Cameron Hargreaves	17	0	3+9	0	0+0	0	1+0	0	3+1	0
21	FW	(Kenya) KEN	Jonah Ayunga	35	3	13+17	2	1+0	0	0+1	0	1+2	1
22	DF	(England) ENG	Josh Hare	27	2	14+5	0	1+1	1	0+1	0	3+2	1
23	MF	(England) ENG	Tom Mehew	3	2	0+1	0	0+0	0	0+0	0	2+0	2
24	DF	(Democratic Republic of the Congo) COD	David Tutonda	22	0	10+10	0	0+0	0	0+0	0	2+0	0
25	DF	(Wales) WAL	Cian Harries	32	0	26+2	0	0+1	0	0+0	0	3+0	0
26	DF	(England) ENG	Jack Baldwin	45	2	32+6	1	3+0	1	1+0	0	3+0	0
28	MF	(England) ENG	Zain Walker	15	0	4+7	0	0+0	0	0+0	0	3+1	0
29	FW	(England) ENG	Kieran Phillips	1	0	0+0	0	0+0	0	0+0	0	0+1	0
32	GK	(Finland) FIN	Anssi Jaakkola	24	0	21+0	0	2+0	0	0+0	0	1+0	0
33	MF	(England) ENG	Alex Rodman	18	1	11+5	1	0+1	0	0+0	0	1+0	0
37	DF	(Wales) WAL	Pablo Martinez	8	0	8+0	0	0+0	0	0+0	0	0+0	0
39	MF	(Republic of Ireland) IRL	Josh Barrett	11	0	0+9	0	0+1	0	0+0	0	1+0	0
41	MF	(Turkey) TUR	Erhun Oztumer *	25	1	10+12	0	3+0	1	0+0	0	0+0	0
42	MF	(England) ENG	Abu Ogogo	4	0	3+0	0	0+0	0	0+0	0	1+0	0
43	DF	(England) ENG	George Williams	26	0	26+0	0	0+0	0	0+0	0	0+0	0
47	DF	(England) ENG	Ali Koiki	13	1	3+7	0	1+0	0	0+0	0	2+0	1
51	GK	(England) ENG	Jed Ward	1	0	1+0	0	0+0	0	0+0	0	0+0	0
Players out on loan:
18	DF	(Scotland) SCO	Michael Kelly	3	0	0+0	0	0+0	0	0+0	0	3+0	0

=== Goals record ===
As of match played 9 May 2021

Rank	No.	Nat.	Po.	Name	League One	FA Cup	League Cup	League Trophy	Total
1	3	(England)	LB	Luke Leahy	8	2	0	0	10
2	9	(England)	CF	Brandon Hanlan	7	1	0	1	9
3	11	(Scotland)	LW	Sam Nicholson	6	1	0	1	8
4	14	(England)	CM	Luke McCormick	6	0	0	0	6
5	17	(England)	CF	James Daly	3	1	0	0	4
6	8	(England)	CM	Zain Westbrooke	2	0	0	1	3
6	21	(Kenya)	CF	Jonah Ayunga	2	0	0	1	3
8	5	(Germany)	CB	Max Ehmer	1	1	0	0	2
8	15	(England)	CB	Alfie Kilgour	1	1	0	0	2
8	22	(England)	RB	Josh Hare	0	1	0	1	2
8	23	(England)	CM	Tom Mehew	0	0	0	2	2
8	26	(England)	CB	Jack Baldwin	1	1	0	0	2
12	4	(England)	DM	Josh Grant	1	0	0	0	1
12	6	(England)	DM	Ed Upson	1	0	0	0	1
12	33	(England)	RM	Alex Rodman	1	0	0	0	1
12	41	(Turkey)	AM	Erhun Oztumer	0	1	0	0	1
12	47	(England)	LB	Ali Koiki	0	0	0	1	1
Total					40	10	0	8	58

=== Disciplinary record ===
As of match played 9 May 2021

Rank	No.	Nat.	Po.	Name	League One			FA Cup			League Cup			League Trophy			Total		
Rank	No.	Nat.	Po.	Name	Yellow card	(yellow card) (yellow-red card)	Red card	Yellow card	(yellow card) (yellow-red card)	Red card	Yellow card	(yellow card) (yellow-red card)	Red card	Yellow card	(yellow card) (yellow-red card)	Red card	Yellow card	(yellow card) (yellow-red card)	Red card
1	14	(England)	CM	Luke McCormick	8	1	0	0	0	0	0	0	0	0	0	0	8	1	0
2	6	(England)	CM	Ed Upson	6	0	1	0	0	0	0	0	0	1	0	0	7	0	1
3	3	(England)	LB	Luke Leahy	6	0	0	1	0	0	0	0	0	0	0	0	7	0	0
3	4	(England)	DM	Josh Grant	5	0	0	0	0	0	1	0	0	1	0	0	7	0	0
3	26	(England)	CB	Jack Baldwin	6	0	0	0	0	0	0	0	0	1	0	0	7	0	0
6	5	(Germany)	CB	Max Ehmer	6	0	0	0	0	0	0	0	0	0	0	0	6	0	0
7	25	(Wales)	CB	Cian Harries	5	0	0	0	0	0	0	0	0	0	0	0	5	0	0
8	15	(England)	CB	Alfie Kilgour	2	0	0	1	0	0	0	0	0	1	0	0	4	0	0
8	24	(Democratic Republic of the Congo)	LB	David Tutonda	4	0	0	0	0	0	0	0	0	0	0	0	4	0	0
10	9	(England)	CF	Brandon Hanlan	3	0	0	0	0	0	0	0	0	0	0	0	3	0	0
10	32	(Finland)	GK	Anssi Jaakkola	2	0	0	1	0	0	0	0	0	0	0	0	3	0	0
10	43	(England)	RB	George Williams	3	0	0	0	0	0	0	0	0	0	0	0	3	0	0
13	11	(Scotland)	LW	Sam Nicholson	2	0	0	0	0	0	0	0	0	0	0	0	2	0	0
13	20	(England)	CM	Cameron Hargreaves	2	0	0	0	0	0	0	0	0	0	0	0	2	0	0
13	21	(Kenya)	CF	Jonah Ayunga	2	0	0	0	0	0	0	0	0	0	0	0	2	0	0
13	22	(England)	RB	Josh Hare	2	0	0	0	0	0	0	0	0	0	0	0	2	0	0
13	33	(England)	RM	Alex Rodman	2	0	0	0	0	0	0	0	0	0	0	0	2	0	0
13	41	(Turkey)	AM	Erhun Oztumer	2	0	0	0	0	0	0	0	0	0	0	0	2	0	0
13	42	(England)	CM	Abu Ogogo	1	0	0	0	0	0	0	0	0	1	0	0	2	0	0
20	2	(England)	RB	Mark Little	1	0	0	0	0	0	0	0	0	0	0	0	1	0	0
20	13	(England)	GK	Joe Day	0	0	1	0	0	0	0	0	0	0	0	0	0	0	1
20	17	(England)	CF	James Daly	1	0	0	0	0	0	0	0	0	0	0	0	1	0	0
20	37	(Wales)	CB	Pablo Martinez	1	0	0	0	0	0	0	0	0	0	0	0	1	0	0
Total					72	1	2	3	0	0	1	0	0	5	0	0	81	1	2
