= James Daly (footballer) =

English footballer

- Daly with Yeovil Town in 2026

Personal information
- Full name: James Stanley Daly
- Date of birth: 12 January 2000 (age 26)
- Place of birth: Brighton, England
- Height: 1.78 m (5 ft 10 in)
- Position: Forward

Team information
- Current team: Yeovil Town
- Number: 11

Youth career
- 2014–2018: Crystal Palace

Senior career*
Years	Team	Apps	(Gls)
2018–2020	Crystal Palace	0	(0)
2018–2019	→ Kingstonian (loan)	16	(6)
2020–2021	Bristol Rovers	31	(3)
2021–2022	Stevenage	15	(0)
2022–2023	Woking	35	(7)
2023–2025	Harrogate Town	52	(4)
2024	→ Aldershot Town (loan)	15	(2)
2025–	Yeovil Town	49	(9)
- * Club domestic league appearances and goals as of 22:31, 21 November 2026 (UTC)

James Stanley Daly (born 12 January 2000) is an English footballer who plays as a forward for National League club Yeovil Town.

== Early life ==
Daly was born in Brighton, East Sussex and supports Brighton & Hove Albion. However, upon signing for rivals Crystal Palace, Daly also developed an affinity for the Eagles.

== Club career ==
Daly was invited for a trial at Brighton aged 10 or 11, but was rejected. He subsequently joined the academy of rivals Crystal Palace aged 14. On 7 April 2018, he was named in the first team squad, as a substitute, for an away match against AFC Bournemouth. In May 2018, he was named as the club's "Scholar of the Year" and in July signed a one-year professional deal with the club. In August 2018, Daly joined Isthmian League Premier Division side Kingstonian on loan until the end of the 2018–19 season. In June 2019, Daly signed a contract extension with Crystal Palace. Daly was included as an unused substitute in three first-team squads over the Christmas period in 2019. In the 2019–20 season Daly regularly played as a defender for the Crystal Palace under-23 side.

On 31 January 2020, Daly joined EFL League Two side Bristol Rovers on a two-and-a-half-year deal. He made his debut for Bristol Rovers as a 71st-minute substitute for Liam Sercombe on 29 February in a home 0–1 defeat to Shrewsbury Town. On 10 October 2020, Daly scored his first goal for the club, heading home to equalise as Rovers went on to win 2-1 away at Lincoln City.

Daly joined fellow League Two club Stevenage on a free transfer on 2 June 2021.

On 2 June 2022, Daly agreed to join National League side, Woking on a one-year deal following his release from Stevenage.

On 29 June 2023, Daly signed a two-year contract with Harrogate Town.

In February 2024, Daly joined National League club Aldershot Town on loan until the end of the season.

On 2 July 2025, Daly joined National League side Yeovil Town.

== Personal life ==
James has a twin brother, Joel, who is also a footballer and currently plays for Whitehawk.

== Career statistics ==
As of match played 21 November 2026

Appearances and goals by club, season and competition
Club	Season	League			FA Cup		League Cup		Other		Total	
Club	Season	Division	Apps	Goals	Apps	Goals	Apps	Goals	Apps	Goals	Apps	Goals
Crystal Palace	2017–18	Premier League	0	0	—		—		—		0	0
Crystal Palace	2018–19	Premier League	0	0	—		—		—		0	0
Crystal Palace	2019–20	Premier League	0	0	0	0	—		—		0	0
Crystal Palace	Total		0	0	0	0	0	0	0	0	0	0
Kingstonian (loan)	2018–19	Isthmian League Premier Division	16	6	1	0	0	0	2 (Note: One appearance in each of the FA Trophy and Surrey County Cup)	1 (Note: One goal in Surrey County Cup)	19	7
Bristol Rovers	2019–20	League One	3	0	—		—		0	0	3	0
Bristol Rovers	2020–21	League One	28	3	1	1	0	0	3 (Note: Appearance(s) in EFL Trophy)	0	32	4
Bristol Rovers	Total		31	3	1	1	0	0	3	0	35	4
Stevenage	2021–22	League Two	15	0	0	0	1	0	3	1	19	1
Woking	2022–23	National League	35	7	1	0	0	0	1 (Note: Appearance in National League play offs)	0	37	7
Harrogate Town	2023–24	League Two	14	1	0	0	2	0	1	0	17	1
Harrogate Town	2024–25	League Two	38	3	3	0	2	1	2	0	45	4
Harrogate Town	Total		52	4	3	0	4	1	3	0	62	5
Aldershot Town (loan)	2023–24	National League	15	2	0	0	—		0	0	15	2
Yeovil Town	2025–26	National League	33	6	0	0	—		4 (Note: Three appearances and one goal in FA Trophy, one appearance in Somerset Premier Cup)	1	37	7
Yeovil Town	2026–27	National League	16	3	3	1	—		1 (Note: Appearance in Somerset Premier Cup)	1	20	5
Yeovil Town	Total		49	9	3	1	—		5	2	57	12
Career total			213	31	9	2	5	1	17	4	244	38
