= Jordi van Stappershoef =

Dutch footballer (born 1996)

Personal information
- Date of birth: 10 March 1996 (age 30)
- Place of birth: Amsterdam, Netherlands
- Height: 2.00 m (6 ft 6 1/2 in)
- Position: Goalkeeper

Team information
- Current team: Maidenhead United
- Number: 22

Youth career
- Volendam

Senior career*
Years	Team	Apps	(Gls)
2014–2019	Volendam	23	(0)
2016–2018	Jong Volendam	40	(0)
2019–2021	Bristol Rovers	13	(0)
2021	Jong AZ	0	(0)
2021–2023	AFC	10	(0)
2023–2025	Aldershot Town	45	(0)
2025–	Maidenhead United	46	(0)
- * Club domestic league appearances and goals as of 06:16, 2 May 2026 (UTC)

Jordi van Stappershoef (born 10 March 1996) is a Dutch footballer who plays as a goalkeeper for Maidenhead United. Besides the Netherlands, he has played in England.

== Club career ==
He made his professional debut in the Eerste Divisie for FC Volendam on 29 August 2014 in a game against Sparta Rotterdam.

=== Bristol Rovers ===
On 13 June 2019, van Stappershoef joined League One side Bristol Rovers on a free transfer. He made his debut for the club in the EFL Trophy in a 1–1 draw with Plymouth Argyle, and made his first league start that weekend on the 7 September 2019 in a 3–3 draw with Accrington Stanley due to the fact first-choice ‘keeper Anssi Jaakkola was on international duty. At the end of the 2020–21 season, van Stappershoef was announced to be one of thirteen players who would not be having their contract extended at the club.

=== Return to the Netherlands ===
Following his release from Bristol Rovers, van Stappershoef returned to the Netherlands to join Jong AZ. He subsequently joined AFC in November 2021.

=== Aldershot Town ===
On 6 July 2023, van Stappershoef returned to England with National League club Aldershot Town on a one-year deal having been training with the club. The move saw him reunite with now Aldershot manager, Tommy Widdrington, who had brought the goalkeeper to Bristol Rovers in his previous Director of Football role.

On 6 June 2024, van Stappershoef signed a new one-year deal with the club. He departed the club at the end of the 2024–25 season.

=== Maidenhead United ===
van Stappershoef joined Maidenhead United for the 2025-26 season.

== Career statistics ==
As of end of 2025–26 season

Appearances and goals by club, season and competition
Club	Season	League			National Cup		League Cup		Other		Total	
Club	Season	Division	Apps	Goals	Apps	Goals	Apps	Goals	Apps	Goals	Apps	Goals
FC Volendam	2014–15	Eerste Divisie	1	0	0	0	—		0	0	1	0
FC Volendam	2015–16	Eerste Divisie	0	0	0	0	—		0	0	0	0
FC Volendam	2016–17	Eerste Divisie	2	0	0	0	—		0	0	2	0
FC Volendam	2017–18	Eerste Divisie	0	0	0	0	—		—		0	0
FC Volendam	2018–19	Eerste Divisie	20	0	0	0	—		—		20	0
FC Volendam	Total		23	0	0	0	—		0	0	23	0
Jong Volendam	2016–17	Derde Divisie Zaterdag	18	0	—		—		—		18	0
Jong Volendam	2017–18	Derde Divisie Zaterdag	21	0	—		—		2 (Note: Appearances in Derde Divisie promotion play-offs)	0	23	0
Jong Volendam	2018–19	Derde Divisie Zondag	1	0	—		—		—		1	0
Jong Volendam	Total		40	0	0	0	—		2	0	42	0
Bristol Rovers	2019–20	League One	5	0	3	0	0	0	5 (Note: Appearances in EFL Trophy)	0	13	0
Bristol Rovers	2020–21	League One	8	0	0	0	1	0	4	0	13	0
Bristol Rovers	Total		13	0	3	0	1	0	9	0	26	0
AFC	2022–23	Tweede Divisie	10	0	0	0	—		0	0	10	0
Aldershot Town	2023–24	National League	42	0	5	0	—		2 (Note: Appearance(s) in FA Trophy)	0	49	0
Aldershot Town	2024–25	National League	3	0	1	0	—		7 (Note: Two appearances in FA Trophy, five appearances in National League Cup)	0	11	0
Aldershot Town	Total		45	0	6	0	0	0	9	0	60	0
Maidenhead United	2025–26	National League South	46	0	1	0	—		2 (Note: One appearance in FA Trophy, one appearance in National League South playoffs)	0	49	0
Career total			187	0	10	0	1	0	22	0	210	0

== Honours ==
Aldershot Town

- FA Trophy: 2024–25
