= Russe =

Russe may refer to:

- Ruse, Bulgaria, a city
- Russian language, the official language in Russia
- Luke Russe, an English professional footballer
- Charlotte Russe (clothing retailer)
