= Luke Leahy =

English footballer (born 1992)

Personal information
- Full name: Luke Leahy
- Date of birth: 19 November 1992 (age 33)
- Place of birth: Coventry, England
- Height: 5 ft 10 in (1.78 m)
- Positions: Defender; midfielder

Team information
- Current team: Wycombe Wanderers
- Number: 10

Senior career*
Years	Team	Apps	(Gls)
2011–2012	Rugby Town	31	(2)
2012–2017	Falkirk	127	(11)
2017–2019	Walsall	90	(5)
2019–2021	Bristol Rovers	70	(8)
2021–2023	Shrewsbury Town	88	(17)
2023–	Wycombe Wanderers	125	(15)
- * Club domestic league appearances and goals as of 11 October 2026 (UTC)

Luke Leahy (born 19 November 1992) is an English professional footballer who plays as a defender or midfielder for EFL League One club Wycombe Wanderers. He started his career at Rugby Town and signed for Falkirk in 2012, where he played for five seasons.

== Career ==
Leahy began his career with Rugby Town, affiliated with the Gordon Strachan Football Foundation.

=== Falkirk ===
Leahy signed for Falkirk in the summer of 2012, after trials with Birmingham City, Bradford City and Peterborough United.

He was signed by Steven Pressley originally as an attacking midfielder, despite the fact he had played left-back for Rugby Town the previous season. He made his first team début in the Scottish Challenge Cup against Stirling Albion on 28 July 2012. His league debut came in September against Cowdenbeath at Central Park as a substitute in the 72nd minute of the game. On 10 November 2012, he scored his first goal for The Bairns against Raith Rovers at Stark's Park. However, he would only go on to make three further appearances that season; two of which were from the bench.

Leahy continued to be a peripheral figure under Gary Holt as he struggled to stake a claim for a place in the side; on 7 September 2013, he was even listed as the substitute goalkeeper for Falkirk in their Scottish Challenge Cup Quarter Final against Raith Rovers, as Falkirk didn't have a third choice keeper to put on the bench. He made 23 appearances in all competitions in the 2013–14 season, most of which were from the bench, and managed a solitary goal; an injury time equaliser against Dundee at Dens Park.

Peter Houston became Falkirk manager in the summer of 2014, just after Leahy had signed a new two-year contract extension. Houston was the first manager to give Leahy a chance to hold down a place in the side. He was on the bench for the first four league games of season 2014/15, but started the 1–1 draw with Queen of the South on 13 September 2014 at left-back, and has since made the position his own. Leahy made 41 appearances in all competitions; he also started the 2015 Scottish Cup Final for Falkirk against Inverness Caledonian Thistle, which they lost 2–1. He continued to be a mainstay in the Falkirk team that had a fantastic season finishing 2nd in the 2015/16 Scottish Championship, making 46 appearances across all competitions. On 22 August 2015, he scored what would go on to be voted Falkirk's goal of the season in a 2–1 win against Livingston at Almondvale. On 19 February 2016, Leahy penned a one-year extension with Falkirk, keeping him at the club until the summer of 2017. Leahy left the Bairns in May 2017, following the expiration of his contract.

=== Bristol Rovers ===
He was released by Walsall at the end of the 2018–19 season. On 9 July 2019, Leahy joined League One side Bristol Rovers. He made his debut for the club on 3 August 2019, in an opening 2–0 defeat away at Blackpool. He scored his first goal for the club on 10 November 2019, opening the scoring at the back-post in a 1–1 draw with Bromley in the FA Cup first round.

Leahy scored his first league goal for Rovers on the opening day of the 2020–21, converting a penalty in a 1–1 draw away at Sunderland. With the appointment of Rovers' third manager of the season Joey Barton, Leahy was made captain of the club as Max Ehmer lost his armband. On 10 April 2021, Leahy scored his tenth goal of the season to open the scoring in a vital relegation six-pointer against Northampton Town, a game in which Rovers would go on to draw 1–1. Leahy was out of contract at the end of the 2020–21 season, a season that saw Rovers relegated bottom of the league. Despite an offer of a new contract from the club, Leahy opted to leave instead.

=== Shrewsbury Town ===
On 17 May 2021, Leahy agreed to join Shrewsbury Town, signing a two-year contract from 1 July 2021. He left Shrewsbury Town on 11 July 2023 after handing in a transfer request.

=== Wycombe Wanderers ===
On 11 July 2023, Leahy joined Wycombe Wanderers on a 3 year Contract. On 19 September 2023, Leahy scored his first goal for the club in a 1–0 victory against Crystal Palace's U21 team in the group stage of the EFL Trophy. Later the same month on 30 September, he scored his first regular season goal by converting a penalty in a 2–0 win over Carlisle United. On 11 November 2023, Leahy was knocked unconscious in the penalty area while challenging for the ball at home against Stevenage in a 1–0 defeat. He required hospitalization afterwards.

== Career statistics ==
As of match played 3 May 2025

Appearances and goals by club, season and competition
Club	Season	League			National cup		League cup		Other		Total	
Club	Season	Division	Apps	Goals	Apps	Goals	Apps	Goals	Apps	Goals	Apps	Goals
Rugby Town	2011–12	SL Division One Central	31	2	0	0	—		4 (Note: One appearance in FA Trophy, two appearances in Southern League Cup, one appearance in Birmingham Senior Cup)	0	35	2
Falkirk	2012–13	Scottish First Division	8	1	0	0	1	0	1 (Note: Appearance in the Scottish Challenge Cup)	0	10	1
Falkirk	2013–14	Scottish Championship	19	1	0	0	2	0	2 (Note: One Appearance in the Scottish Challenge Cup, one appearance in Scottish Premiership play-offs)	0	23	1
Falkirk	2014–15	Scottish Championship	33	3	5	0	1	0	2	0	41	3
Falkirk	2015–16	Scottish Championship	36	3	2	0	3	0	5 (Note: Two appearances in the Scottish Challenge Cup, three appearances and one goal in Scottish Premiership play-offs)	1	46	4
Falkirk	2016–17	Scottish Championship	31	3	0	0	4	0	3 (Note: One appearance in the Scottish Challenge Cup, two appearances in Scottish Premiership play-offs)	0	38	3
Falkirk	Total		127	11	7	0	11	0	13	1	158	12
Walsall	2017–18	League One	46	2	1	0	1	0	4 (Note: Appearance(s) in the EFL Trophy)	1	52	3
Walsall	2018–19	League One	44	3	4	0	2	0	3	0	53	3
Walsall	Total		90	5	5	0	3	0	7	1	105	6
Bristol Rovers	2019–20	League One	32	0	6	1	2	0	1	0	41	1
Bristol Rovers	2020–21	League One	38	8	2	2	1	0	3	0	44	10
Bristol Rovers	Total		70	8	8	3	3	0	4	0	85	11
Shrewsbury Town	2021–22	League One	42	8	3	1	2	0	3	0	50	9
Shrewsbury Town	2022–23	League One	46	9	3	2	2	1	0	0	51	12
Shrewsbury Town	Total		88	17	6	2	4	1	3	0	101	21
Wycombe Wanderers	2023–24	League One	44	11	1	0	2	0	7	1	54	12
Wycombe Wanderers	2024–25	League One	39	4	4	2	2	0	3	1	48	7
Wycombe Wanderers	Total		83	15	5	2	4	0	10	2	102	19
Career total			489	58	31	8	25	1	41	4	586	71

== Honours ==
Wycombe Wanderers

- EFL Trophy runner-up: 2023–24

Individual

- EFL League One Player of the Month: January 2023
