= 2019–20 Bristol Rovers F.C. season =

Bristol Rovers
2019–20 season
- President: Wael al-Qadi
- Chairman: Steve Hamer (until 21 November)
- Manager: Graham Coughlan (until 17 December); Ben Garner (from 23 December)
- Stadium: Memorial Stadium
- League One: 14th
- FA Cup: Third round
- EFL Cup: Second round
- EFL Trophy: Third round
- Top goalscorer: League: Jonson Clarke-Harris (13); All: Jonson Clarke-Harris (16)
- Highest home attendance: 9,096 vs. AFC Wimbledon (26 December 2019)
- Lowest home attendance: 865 vs. Leyton Orient (4 December 2019, EFL Trophy second round
- Average home league attendance: 7,348
Home colours	Away colours	Third colours

The 2019-20 season was the 137th season in Bristol Rovers' existence and their 92nd in the English Football League. Rovers contested in the third tier of English football, the League One; and three cup competitions: FA Cup, EFL Cup and EFL Trophy.

== Transfers ==
=== Transfers in ===
Date	Position	Nationality	Name	From	Fee	Ref.
1 July 2019	CB	(England)	Tom Davies	(England) Coventry City	Free transfer	
1 July 2019	RB	(England)	Josh Hare	(England) Eastleigh	Free transfer	
1 July 2019	GK	(Finland)	Anssi Jaakkola	(England) Reading	Free transfer	
1 July 2019	RB	(England)	Mark Little	(England) Bolton Wanderers	Free transfer	
1 July 2019	GK	(Netherlands)	Jordi van Stappershoef	(Netherlands) Volendam	Free transfer	
9 July 2019	LB	(England)	Luke Leahy	(England) Walsall	Free transfer	
14 August 2019	RB	(England)	Harry Hodges	(England) Plymouth Argyle	Free transfer	
7 January 2020	AM	(Republic of Ireland)	Josh Barrett	(England) Reading	Undisclosed	
31 January 2020	FW	(England)	James Daly	(England) Crystal Palace	Undisclosed	
31 January 2020	CB	(Wales)	Cian Harries	(Wales) Swansea City	Free transfer	

=== Loans in ===
Date from	Position	Nationality	Name	From	Date until	Ref.
10 July 2019	CF	(England)	Tyler Smith	(England) Sheffield United	15 January 2020	
26 July 2019	CF	(Nigeria)	Victor Adeboyejo	(England) Barnsley	24 January 2020	
6 January 2020	AM	(England)	Jayden Mitchell-Lawson	(England) Derby County	30 June 2020	
16 January 2020	LW	(England)	Josh Ginnelly	(England) Preston North End	30 June 2020	
22 January 2020	GK	(England)	Jamal Blackman	(England) Chelsea	30 June 2020	
30 January 2020	CF	(England)	Timmy Abraham	(England) Fulham	30 June 2020	

=== Loans out ===
Date from	Position	Nationality	Name	To	Date until	Ref.
25 July 2019	RW	(England)	Bernard Mensah	(England) Maidenhead United	30 June 2020	
1 August 2019	CF	(Scotland)	Gavin Reilly	(England) Cheltenham Town	January 2020	
15 August 2019	MF	(England)	Luke Russe	(England) Gloucester City	4 January 2020	
13 September 2019	MF	(England)	Theo Widdrington	(England) Welling United	January 2020	
24 September 2019	GK	(England)	Liam Armstrong	(England) Mangotsfield United	October 2019	
25 October 2019	CF	(England)	Harry Warwick	(England) Gosport Borough	November 2019	
31 October 2019	RB	(England)	Harry Hodges	(England) Gloucester City	December 2019	
12 November 2019	CF	(England)	Deon Moore	(England) Billericay Town	December 2019	
10 December 2019	GK	(England)	Liam Armstrong	(England) Salisbury	17 December 2019	
12 December 2019	MF	(England)	Tom Mehew	(England) Stratford Town	January 2020	
16 December 2019	GK	(Morocco)	Alexis André Jr.	(England) Salisbury	January 2020	
9 January 2020	DF	(Wales)	Luc Noble	(England) Mangotsfield United	Work experience	
9 January 2020	GK	(England)	Harry Thomson-Barker	(England) Frome Town	Work experience	
9 January 2020	CF	(England)	Harry Warwick	(England) Dorchester Town	February 2020	
10 January 2020	MF	(Wales)	Lewis Clutton	(England) Salisbury	February 2020	
16 January 2020	MF	(England)	Luke Russe	(England) Chippenham Town	February 2020	
31 January 2020	CF	(England)	Tom Nichols	(England) Cheltenham Town	30 June 2020	
6 March 2020	GK	(Morocco)	Alexis André Jr.	(England) Gloucester City	April 2020	
6 March 2020	CM	(England)	Theo Widdrington	(England) Hemel Hempstead Town	April 2020	

=== Transfers out ===
Date	Position	Nationality	Name	To	Fee	Ref.
1 July 2019	DF	(England)	Alfie Clarke	Free agent	Released	
1 July 2019	CB	(England)	James Clarke	(England) Walsall	Free transfer	
1 July 2019	MF	(England)	Connor Jones	Free agent	Released	
1 July 2019	RB	(England)	Daniel Leadbitter	(Wales) Newport County	Released	
1 July 2019	MF	(England)	Lewis Leigh-Gilchrist	Free agent	Released	
1 July 2019	CM	(England)	Chris Lines	(England) Northampton Town	Released	
1 July 2019	CB	(Wales)	Tom Lockyer	(England) Charlton Athletic	Released	
1 July 2019	RB	(Wales)	Joe Partington	(England) Eastleigh	Free transfer	
1 July 2019	CF	(England)	Stefan Payne	(England) Tranmere Rovers	Mutual consent	
1 July 2019	CM	(England)	Stuart Sinclair	(England) Walsall	Released	
1 July 2019	GK	(England)	Sam Slocombe	(England) Notts County	Released	
1 July 2019	GK	(England)	Adam Smith	(England) Forest Green Rovers	Released	
1 July 2019	FW	(Wales)	James Spruce	(England) Gloucester City	Released	
10 August 2019	LB	(England)	Kris Owens	(Wales) Connah's Quay Nomads	Free transfer	
8 January 2020	CF	(England)	Deon Moore	(England) Hemel Hempstead Town	Released	
23 January 2020	RW	(England)	Bernard Mensah	(England) Gloucester City	Free Transfer	

== Pre-season ==
On 16 May, The Gas confirmed their pre-season schedule. The Cheltenham Town friendly had to be replaced at a later date and replaced with a match against Plymouth Argyle.

6 July 2019 Friendly	Yate Town	1–10	Bristol Rovers	Yate
13:00 BST	Pearce 28'	Report	Moore 12'; Bennett 17'; Nichols 38'; Clarke 47', 82'; Rodman 58'; Reilly 59', 62', 69'; Mensah 74'	Stadium: Lodge Road; Attendance: 1,100

10 July 2019 Friendly	St Mochta’s	0–7	Bristol Rovers	Dublin
19:45 BST		Report	Nichols 3', 26', 27'; Moore 52'; Smith 71'; Hare 73'; Tomlinson 86'	Stadium: Porterstown Road

13 July 2019 Friendly	Kidderminster Harriers	1–1	Bristol Rovers	Kidderminster
15:00 BST	Chambers 36'	Report	Nichols 51'	Stadium: Aggborough Stadium

16 July 2019 Friendly	Bath City	0–2	Bristol Rovers	Bath
19:45 BST		Report	Rodman 7'; Little 77'	Stadium: Twerton Park; Attendance: 1,102

20 July 2019 Friendly	Bristol Rovers	1–2	Birmingham City	Horfield
13:00 BST	Bennett 6'	Report	Pedersen 13'; Jutkiewicz 48'	Stadium: Memorial Stadium; Attendance: 2,743

23 July 2019 Friendly	Bristol Rovers	0–3	Swansea City	Horfield
19:45 BST		Report	Fulton 12'; Bastón 83'; Asoro 90'	Stadium: Memorial Stadium; Attendance: 2,076; Referee: Kevin Johnson

27 July 2019 Friendly	Plymouth Argyle	0–1	Bristol Rovers	Plymouth
15:00 BST		Report	Adeboyejo 83'	Stadium: Home Park; Attendance: 5,099

== Competitions ==
=== League One ===
==== League table ====
Pos	Team	Pld	W	D	L	GF	GA	GD	Pts	PPG
10	Gillingham	35	12	15	8	42	34	+8	51	1.46
11	Ipswich Town	36	14	10	12	46	36	+10	52	1.44
12	Burton Albion	35	12	12	11	50	50	0	48	1.37
13	Blackpool	35	11	12	12	44	43	+1	45	1.29
14	Bristol Rovers	35	12	9	14	38	49	−11	45	1.29
15	Shrewsbury Town	34	10	11	13	31	42	−11	41	1.21
16	Lincoln City	35	12	6	17	44	46	−2	42	1.20
17	Accrington Stanley	35	10	10	15	47	53	−6	40	1.14
18	Rochdale	34	10	6	18	39	57	−18	36	1.06

Source: EFL Official Website
Rules for classification: 1) Points per game; 2) Goal difference; 3) Number of goals scored; 4) Head-to-head results; 5) Wins; 6) Away goals; 7) Penalty points (sec 9.5); 8) 12-point sending-off offences

==== Results summary ====
Overall								Home						Away					
Pld	W	D	L	GF	GA	GD	Pts	W	D	L	GF	GA	GD	W	D	L	GF	GA	GD
35	12	9	14	38	49	−11	45	7	6	5	23	19	+4	5	3	9	15	30	−15

Last updated: 29 February 2020.
Source: BBC

==== Results by matchday ====
Matchday	1	2	3	4	5	6	7	8	9	10	11	12	13	14	15	16	17	18	19	20	21	22	23	24	25	26	27	28	29	30	31	32	33	34	35
Ground	A	H	H	H	H	A	H	A	H	A	H	H	A	H	H	A	A	H	A	H	H	A	A	H	A	H	A	H	A	A	H	A	H	A	H
Result	L	D	L	W	W	L	D	W	D	W	W	W	L	L	D	W	W	W	W	D	L	D	L	L	L	D	D	L	L	D	W	L	L	L	W
Position	22	17	21	17	12	14	13	12	12	8	7	6	7	11	10	9	9	5	4	4	6	8	8	12	13	13	12	13	13	13	13	13	14	15	14

Updated to match(es) played on 29 February 2020. Source: Statto.com
A = Away; H = Home; W = Win; D = Draw; L = Loss

==== Matches ====
On Thursday, 20 June 2019, the EFL League One fixtures were revealed.

3 August 2019 1	Blackpool	2–0	Bristol Rovers	Blackpool
15:00 BST	Spearing 28' (pen.); Gnanduillet 46'; Turton (yellow card) 65'	Report	Smith (yellow card) 72'	Stadium: Bloomfield Road; Attendance: 11,359; Referee: Seb Stockbridge

10 August 2019 2	Bristol Rovers	0–0	Wycombe Wanderers	Horfield
15:00 BST	Ogogo (yellow card) 80'	Report	Smyth (yellow card) 47'; El-Abd (yellow card) 77'	Stadium: Memorial Stadium; Attendance: 7,668; Referee: Paul Marsden

17 August 2019 3	Coventry City	2–0	Bristol Rovers	Bordesley
15:00 BST	Shipley 45+1'; Godden (yellow card) 74'; Kastaneer 82'	Report	Bennett (yellow card) 31'; Davies (yellow card) 65'; Clarke (yellow card) 84'	Stadium: St Andrew's Trillion Trophy Stadium; Attendance: 6,976; Referee: Ross Joyce

20 August 2019 4	Bristol Rovers	2–0	Tranmere Rovers	Horfield
19:45 BST	Clarke-Harris 38'; Smith (yellow card) 88' (goal) 88' (pen.)	Report	Monthé (yellow card) 13'; Banks (yellow card) 29' (yellow-red card) 57'; Blackett-Taylor (red card) 48'; Ray (yellow card) 68'	Stadium: Memorial Stadium; Attendance: 6,802; Referee: Gavin Ward

24 August 2019 5	Bristol Rovers	3–1	Oxford United	Horfield
15:00 BST	Clarke (yellow card) 10'; Upson (yellow card) 22' (goal) 37'; Clarke-Harris 45'; Davies (yellow card) 56'; Nichols 77'	Report	Taylor (yellow card) 15'; Woodburn 27'; Hanson (yellow card) 41'; Fosu (yellow card) 45+4'	Stadium: Memorial Stadium; Attendance: 7,871; Referee: Charles Breakspear

31 August 2019 6	Burton Albion	2–0	Bristol Rovers	Burton upon Trent
15:00 BST	Edwards (yellow card) 33' (goal) 90+5'; Akins 87'	Report	Craig (yellow card) 10'; Clarke (yellow card) 60'; Davies (yellow card) 81'	Stadium: Pirelli Stadium; Attendance: 2,831; Referee: Peter Wright

7 September 2019 7	Bristol Rovers	3–3	Accrington Stanley	Horfield
15:00 BST	Rodman 4'; Clarke-Harris 41', 63' (yellow card) 73'; Clarke (yellow card) 52'	Report	Conneely (yellow card) 10' (yellow-red card) 49'; Clark 18'; Finley 20'; Charles 77' (pen.)	Stadium: Memorial Stadium; Attendance: 6,524; Referee: Neil Hair

14 September 2019 8	Lincoln City	0–1	Bristol Rovers	Lincoln
15:00 BST	Morrell (yellow card) 59'; O'Connor (yellow card) 79'; Bolger (yellow card) 83'	Report	Clarke-Harris 66' (pen.); Upson (yellow card) 69'	Stadium: Sincil Bank; Attendance: 8,712; Referee: Carl Boyeson

17 September 2019 9	Bristol Rovers	1–1	Gillingham	Horfield
19:45 BST	Smith 38'; Sercombe (yellow card) 90+5'	Report	O'Connor 83'	Stadium: Memorial Stadium; Attendance: 6,370; Referee: Kevin Johnson

21 September 2019 10	AFC Wimbledon	1–3	Bristol Rovers	Norbiton
15:00 BST	Forss 20' (yellow card) 21' (yellow-red card) 66'; Folivi (yellow card) 61'; Delaney (yellow card) 64'	Report	Ogogo 29'; Davies (yellow card) 64'; Clarke-Harris 75'; Craig 87'	Stadium: The Cherry Red Records Stadium; Attendance: 4,268; Referee: Nick Kinseley

28 September 2019 11	Bristol Rovers	1–0	Rotherham United	Horfield
15:00 BST	Clarke-Harris 48'	Report		Stadium: Memorial Stadium; Attendance: 7,321; Referee: Michael Salisbury

12 October 2019 12	Bristol Rovers	1–0	Milton Keynes Dons	Horfield
15:00 BST	Rodman (yellow card) 30'; Davies 49'	Report	Martin (yellow card) 20'; Cargill (yellow card) 60'	Stadium: Memorial Stadium; Attendance: 7,864; Referee: Anthony Backhouse

19 October 2019 13	Doncaster Rovers	2–0	Bristol Rovers	Doncaster
15:00 BST	Sadlier 39'; Taylor 56'	Report		Stadium: Keepmoat Stadium; Attendance: 7,659; Referee: David Rock

22 October 2019 14	Bristol Rovers	0–2	Bolton Wanderers	Horfield
19:45 BST	Nichols (yellow card) 51'; Ogogo (yellow card) 53'	Report	L. Murphy 15' (yellow card) 61'; D. Murphy 68'	Stadium: Memorial Stadium; Attendance: 7,244; Referee: Trevor Kettle

26 October 2019 15	Bristol Rovers	2–2	Portsmouth	Horfield
15:00 BST	Upson (yellow card) 29'; Rodman 78'; Ogogo (yellow card) 83'; MacGillivray 90+3' (o.g.)	Report	Raggett (yellow card) 1'; Evans 9' (pen.); McCrorie (yellow card) 39'; Curtis (yellow card) 69' (goal) 70'; Burgess (yellow card) 80'	Stadium: Memorial Stadium; Attendance: 8,648; Referee: Darren Handley

2 November 2019 16	Rochdale	1–2	Bristol Rovers	Spotland
15:00 GMT	Camps 43'	Report	Adeboyejo 8'; O'Connell 11' (o.g.); Kilgour (yellow card) 37'; Ogogo (yellow card) 87'	Stadium: Crown Oil Arena; Attendance: 3,038

16 November 2019	Bristol Rovers	v	Sunderland	Horfield
15:00 GMT		Report		Stadium: Memorial Stadium
Note: On 7 November, the match was postponed due to international call-ups.

23 November 2019 17	Shrewsbury Town	3–4	Bristol Rovers	Shrewsbury
15:00 GMT	Thompson (yellow card) 20'; Laurent (yellow card) 20' (goal) 37', 67'; Norburn (yellow card) 22' (goal) 62'	Report	Craig 11'; Jaakkola (yellow card) 20'; Adeboyejo (yellow card) 21'; Clarke 28' (yellow card) 36'; Sercombe 47'; Ogogo 87'	Stadium: Montgomery Waters Meadow; Attendance: 6,235; Referee: Graham Salisbury

7 December 2019 18	Bristol Rovers	4–2	Southend United	Horfield
15:00 GMT	Little (yellow card) 25'; Craig (yellow card) 27'; Ogogo (yellow card) 42' (goal) 56'; Clarke-Harris 48' (pen.); Upson 75'; Kilgour 81'	Report	Hopper 13'; Goodship 36'; Kiernan (yellow card) 45'; Taylor (yellow card) 85'	Stadium: Memorial Stadium; Attendance: 6,797; Referee: James Oldham

14 December 2019 19	Ipswich Town	1–2	Bristol Rovers	Ipswich
15:00 GMT	Norwood 37'; Downes (yellow card) 45+1'; Woolfenden (yellow card) 51'	Report	Smith 4'; Upson (yellow card) 14'; Nichols 23'; Clarke (yellow card) 45+1' (yellow-red card) 77'; Jaakkola (yellow card) 49'	Stadium: Portman Road; Attendance: 18,806; Referee: James Adcock

21 December 2019 20	Bristol Rovers	0–0	Peterborough United	Horfield
15:00 GMT	Kilgour (yellow card) 52'; Clarke (yellow card) 68'; Craig (yellow card) 82'	Report	Butler (yellow card) 47'	Stadium: Memorial Stadium; Attendance: 8,030; Referee: John Busby

26 December 2019 21	Bristol Rovers	1–2	AFC Wimbledon	Horfield
15:00 GMT	Craig (yellow card) 35'; Clarke-Harris 43' (pen.); Menayese (yellow card) 77'	Report	O'Neill (yellow card) 66'; Forss 70'; Rudoni (yellow card) 80'; McLoughlin (yellow card) 82'; Pigott 84'	Stadium: Memorial Stadium; Attendance: 9,096; Referee: Robert Lewis

29 December 2019 22	Fleetwood Town	0–0	Bristol Rovers	Fleetwood
15:00 GMT	Madden (yellow card) 42'; Andrew (yellow card) 45+1'; Coutts (yellow card) 85'	Report	Leahy (yellow card) 15'; Ogogo (yellow card) 29'; Clarke-Harris (yellow card) 89'	Stadium: Highbury Stadium; Attendance: 2,848; Referee: Paul Marsden

1 January 2020 23	Milton Keynes Dons	3–0	Bristol Rovers	Milton Keynes
15:00 GMT	Healey 16'; Nombe 60'; Agard 84'	Report		Stadium: Stadium MK; Attendance: 8,236; Referee: Sam Purkiss

11 January 2020 24	Bristol Rovers	0–2	Doncaster Rovers	Horfield
15:00 GMT	Sercombe (yellow card) 67'; Upson (yellow card) 81'	Report	Anderson (yellow card) 67'; Whiteman 86'; Bingham 90+3'	Stadium: Memorial Stadium; Attendance: 6,834; Referee: Brett Huxtable

18 January 2020 25	Rotherham United	3–0	Bristol Rovers	Rotherham
15:00 GMT	Crooks (yellow card) 33'; Vassell 51'; Smith 53'; Ogbene 88'	Report	Leahy (yellow card) 90+1'; Rodman (yellow card) 90+4'	Stadium: New York Stadium; Attendance: 8,287; Referee: Leigh Doughty

25 January 2020 26	Bristol Rovers	0–0	Fleetwood Town	Horfield
15:00 GMT	Davies (yellow card) 69'; Clarke-Harris (yellow card) 82' (penalty missed) 87'	Report	Madden (yellow card) 86'	Stadium: Memorial Stadium; Attendance: 6,469; Referee: Christopher Pollard

28 January 2020 27	Bolton Wanderers	1–1	Bristol Rovers	Horwich
20:00 GMT	Darcy (yellow card) 24'; Murphy 82'	Report	Upson (yellow card) 31'; Clarke-Harris 63'; Leahy (yellow card) 84'	Stadium: University of Bolton Stadium; Attendance: 10,657; Referee: Andy Haines

1 February 2020 28	Bristol Rovers	1–2	Coventry City	Horfield
15:00 GMT	Upson (yellow card) 3'; Davies (yellow card) 6'; Clarke-Harris 23'; Kilgour (yellow card) 65'; Ogogo (yellow card) 76'	Report	Walsh (yellow card) 22' (goal) 45+1'; Allen 38'	Stadium: Memorial Stadium; Attendance: 7,859; Referee: Craig Hicks

8 February 2020 29	Wycombe Wanderers	3–1	Bristol Rovers	High Wycombe
15:00 GMT	Akinfenwa 9' (yellow card) 59'; Charles 39'; Bloomfield 41'; Thompson (yellow card) 71'	Report	Mitchell-Lawson 27'; Clarke-Harris (yellow card) 46'; Clarke (yellow card) 65'; Craig (yellow card) 78'; Kilgour (yellow card) 87'	Stadium: Adams Park; Attendance: 5,769; Referee: Tom Nield

11 February 2020 30	Tranmere Rovers	0–0	Bristol Rovers	Birkenhead
19:45 GMT	Ferrier (yellow card) 82'; Nelson (yellow card) 88'	Report	Ogogo (yellow card) 88'; Upson (yellow card) 89'	Stadium: Prenton Park; Attendance: 5,026; Referee: Neil Hair

15 February 2020 31	Bristol Rovers	2–1	Blackpool	Horfield
15:00 GMT	Upson (yellow card) 54'; Kilgour 73'; Ginnelly 84'	Report	Madine 2'; Husband (yellow card) 30'; Heneghan (red card) 43'	Stadium: Memorial Stadium; Attendance: 6,631; Referee: Brett Huxtable

22 February 2020 32	Sunderland	3–0	Bristol Rovers	Sunderland
15:00 GMT	Gooch (yellow card) 31' (goal) 71'; Ozturk (yellow card) 58'; Wyke 73'; O'Nien 82'	Report	Leahy (yellow card) 8'; Craig (yellow card) 55'; Ogogo (red card) 59'	Stadium: Stadium of Light; Attendance: 31,541; Referee: Ben Toner

29 February 2020 33	Bristol Rovers	0–1	Shrewsbury Town	Horfield
15:00 GMT	Menayese (yellow card) 29'; Kilgour (yellow card) 84'	Report	Pierre (yellow card) 43'; Udoh 69'; Williams (yellow card) 74'; Cummings (yellow card) 87'; Lang (yellow card) 90'; Edwards (yellow card) 90'	Stadium: Memorial Stadium; Attendance: 6,954; Referee: Alan Young

7 March 2020 34	Southend United	3–1	Bristol Rovers	Southend-on-Sea
15:00 GMT	Kelman 18'; Egbri 55'; Demetriou (yellow card) 70'; Kilgour 79' (o.g.)	Report	Mitchell-Lawson 46'; Upson (yellow card) 64'; Harries (yellow card) 86'	Stadium: Roots Hall; Attendance: 5,449; Referee: James Oldham

10 March 2020 35	Bristol Rovers	2–0	Sunderland	Horfield
19:45 GMT	Leahy (yellow card) 30'; Clarke-Harris 39' 75' (pen.); Hargreaves (yellow card) 45+1'; Clarke (yellow card) 68'	Report	Lafferty (yellow card) 38'; Ozturk (yellow card) 42'; Flanagan (yellow card) 45+6'	Stadium: Memorial Stadium; Attendance: 7,281; Referee: Charles Breakspear

14 March 2020	Bristol Rovers	v	Ipswich Town	Horfield
15:00 GMT		Report		Stadium: Memorial Stadium
Note: On 13 March 2020, all EFL matches were postponed until the 3 April due to the COVID-19 pandemic

21 March 2020	Peterborough United	v	Bristol Rovers	Peterborough
15:00 GMT		Report		Stadium: London Road Stadium
Note: On 13 March 2020, all EFL matches were postponed until the 3 April due to the COVID-19 pandemic

28 March 2020	Bristol Rovers	v	Rochdale	Horfield
15:00 GMT		Report		Stadium: Memorial Stadium
Note: On 13 March 2020, all EFL matches were postponed until the 3 April due to the COVID-19 pandemic

4 April 2020	Portsmouth	v	Bristol Rovers	Milton
15:00 GMT				Stadium: Fratton Park
Note: On 3 April, the English Football League decided to postpone all football until safe to do so due to the COVID-19 pandemic.

10 April 2020	Oxford United	v	Bristol Rovers	Oxford
13:00 BST				Stadium: Kassam Stadium
Note: On 3 April, the English Football League decided to postpone all football until safe to do so due to the COVID-19 pandemic.

13 April 2020	Bristol Rovers	v	Burton Albion	Horfield
13:00 BST				Stadium: Memorial Stadium
Note: On 3 April, the English Football League decided to postpone all football until safe to do so due to the COVID-19 pandemic.

18 April 2020	Accrington Stanley	v	Bristol Rovers	Accrington
15:00 BST				Stadium: Wham Stadium
Note: On 3 April, the English Football League decided to postpone all football until safe to do so due to the COVID-19 pandemic.

25 April 2020	Bristol Rovers	v	Lincoln City	Horfield
15:00 BST				Stadium: Memorial Stadium
Note: On 3 April, the English Football League decided to postpone all football until safe to do so due to the COVID-19 pandemic.

3 May 2020	Gillingham	v	Bristol Rovers	Gillingham
15:00 BST				Stadium: Priestfield Stadium
Note: On 3 April, the English Football League decided to postpone all football until safe to do so due to the COVID-19 pandemic.

=== FA Cup ===
The first round draw was made on 21 October 2019. The second round draw was made live on 11 November from Chichester City's stadium, Oaklands Park. The third round draw was made live on BBC Two from Etihad Stadium, Micah Richards and Tony Adams conducted the draw.

10 November 2019 First round	Bristol Rovers	1–1	Bromley	Horfield
12:45 GMT	Kilgour (yellow card) 67'; Leahy 78'	Report	Kizzi (yellow card) 62'; Bush 83'	Stadium: Memorial Stadium; Attendance: 3,649; Referee: Daniel Middleton

19 November 2019 First round replay	Bromley	0–1	Bristol Rovers	Bromley
19:45 GMT	Raymond (yellow card) 65'	Report	Clarke-Harris 3' (yellow card) 90+3'; Menayese (yellow card) 70'	Stadium: The H2T Group Stadium; Attendance: 4,558; Referee: Christopher Pollard

1 December 2019 Second round	Bristol Rovers	1–1	Plymouth Argyle	Horfield
14:00 GMT	Upson (yellow card) 8'; Sercombe 74'; Clarke (yellow card) 81'; Kilgour (yellow card) 84'; Menayese (red card) 90+5'	Report	Grant (yellow card) 64'; Sarcevic 84' (pen.) (penalty missed) 90+6'; Telford (yellow card) 90+6'	Stadium: Memorial Stadium; Attendance: 6,215; Referee: Will Finnie

17 December 2019 Second round replay	Plymouth Argyle	0–1	Bristol Rovers	Plymouth
19:30 GMT		Report	Upson (yellow card) 60'; Rodman 68' (yellow card) 70'; Bennett (yellow card) 90+5'	Stadium: Home Park; Attendance: 5,685; Referee: Andy Woolmer

4 January 2020 Third round	Bristol Rovers	2–2	Coventry City	Horfield
15:00 GMT	Clarke-Harris 6' (pen.) (yellow card) 44'; Craig 32'; Nichols (yellow card) 36'; Kilgour (yellow card) 76'; Sercombe (yellow card) 78'	Report	McFadzean (yellow card) 5'; Walsh 31'; Dabo (yellow card) 45+2'; Craig 53' (o.g.)	Stadium: Memorial Stadium; Attendance: 7,000; Referee: Gavin Ward

14 January 2020 Third round replay	Coventry City	3–0	Bristol Rovers	Birmingham
19:45 GMT	Biamou 4', 56'; Pask 50'	Report	Craig (yellow card) 22'; Menayese (yellow card) 69'; Clarke (yellow card) 90+4'	Stadium: St Andrew's; Attendance: 2,693; Referee: Anthony Backhouse

=== EFL Cup ===
The first round draw was made on 20 June. The second round draw was made on 13 August 2019 following the conclusion of all but one first-round matches.

13 August 2019 First round	Bristol Rovers	3–0	Cheltenham Town	Horfield
19:45 BST	Smith 38', 49'; Clarke-Harris 67'	Report		Stadium: Memorial Stadium; Attendance: 2,909; Referee: Graham Salisbury

27 August 2019 Second round	Bristol Rovers	1–2	Brighton & Hove Albion	Horfield
19:45 BST	Nichols 64'	Report	Connolly 55' (yellow card) 72'; Murray 90+2'	Stadium: Memorial Stadium; Referee: Matt Donohue

=== EFL Trophy ===
On 9 July 2019, the pre-determined group stage draw was announced with Invited clubs to be drawn on 12 July 2019. The draw for the second round was made on 16 November 2019 live on Sky Sports. The third round draw was confirmed on 5 December 2019.

Pos	Div	Team	Pld	W	PW	PL	L	GF	GA	GD	Pts	Qualification
1	L1	Bristol Rovers	3	2	0	1	0	4	2	+2	7	Advance to Round 2
2	ACA	Chelsea U21	3	2	0	0	1	5	4	+1	6	Advance to Round 2
3	L2	Plymouth Argyle	3	1	1	0	1	4	2	+2	5	
4	L2	Swindon Town	3	0	0	0	3	2	7	−5	0	

Source: EFL.com

3 September 2019 Group stage	Plymouth Argyle	1–1 (5–3 p)	Bristol Rovers	Plymouth
19:45 BST	Moore 40'	Report	Ogogo (yellow card) 14'; Nichols 30'	Stadium: Home Park; Attendance: 2,518; Referee: Keith Stroud
	Penalties
	Rudden (penalty scored); Randell (penalty scored); Lolos (penalty scored); Sarcevic (penalty scored); Cooper (penalty scored)		Bennett (penalty missed); Kelly (penalty scored); Craig (penalty scored); Adeboyejo (penalty scored)

24 September 2019 Group stage	Bristol Rovers	2–1	Chelsea U21	Horfield
19:45 BST	Kelly (yellow card) 34'; Kilgour (yellow card) 48'; Adeboyejo 59'; Sercombe 73'	Report	Brown 31'; Lavinier (yellow card) 75'; McEachran (yellow card) 86'	Stadium: Memorial Stadium; Attendance: 1,144; Referee: Anthony Coggins

13 November 2019 Group stage	Bristol Rovers	1–0	Swindon Town	Horfield
19:45 GMT	Little 73'; Clarke (yellow card) 90+2'	Report	Broadbent (yellow card) 75'; Sanokho (yellow card) 80'	Stadium: Memorial Stadium; Attendance: 1,083; Referee: Ollie Yates

4 December 2019 Second round	Bristol Rovers	1–1 (4–2 p)	Leyton Orient	Horfield
19:45 GMT	Kilgour 16'; Holmes-Dennis (yellow card) 43'	Report	Wilkinson (yellow card) 13'; Angol 20'; Harrold (yellow card) 85'	Stadium: Memorial Stadium; Attendance: 865; Referee: Joshua Smith
	Penalties
	Clarke-Harris (penalty scored); Rodman (penalty scored); Craig (penalty scored); Sercombe (penalty scored)		Wright (penalty missed); Harrold (penalty scored); Marsh (penalty scored); Sotiriou (penalty missed)

8 January 2020 Third round	Bristol Rovers	0–1	Stevenage	Horfield
19:45 GMT	Upson (yellow card) 74' (yellow-red card) 87'; Craig (yellow card) 90'	Report	Mackail-Smith 17'; Nugent (yellow card) 24'; Kennedy (yellow card) 30'; Denton (yellow card) 45'; Parrett (yellow card) 58'; Vancooten (yellow card) 68'	Stadium: Memorial Stadium; Attendance: 1,180; Referee: Darren Handley
