= Josh Barrett (footballer) =

Irish footballer (born 1998)

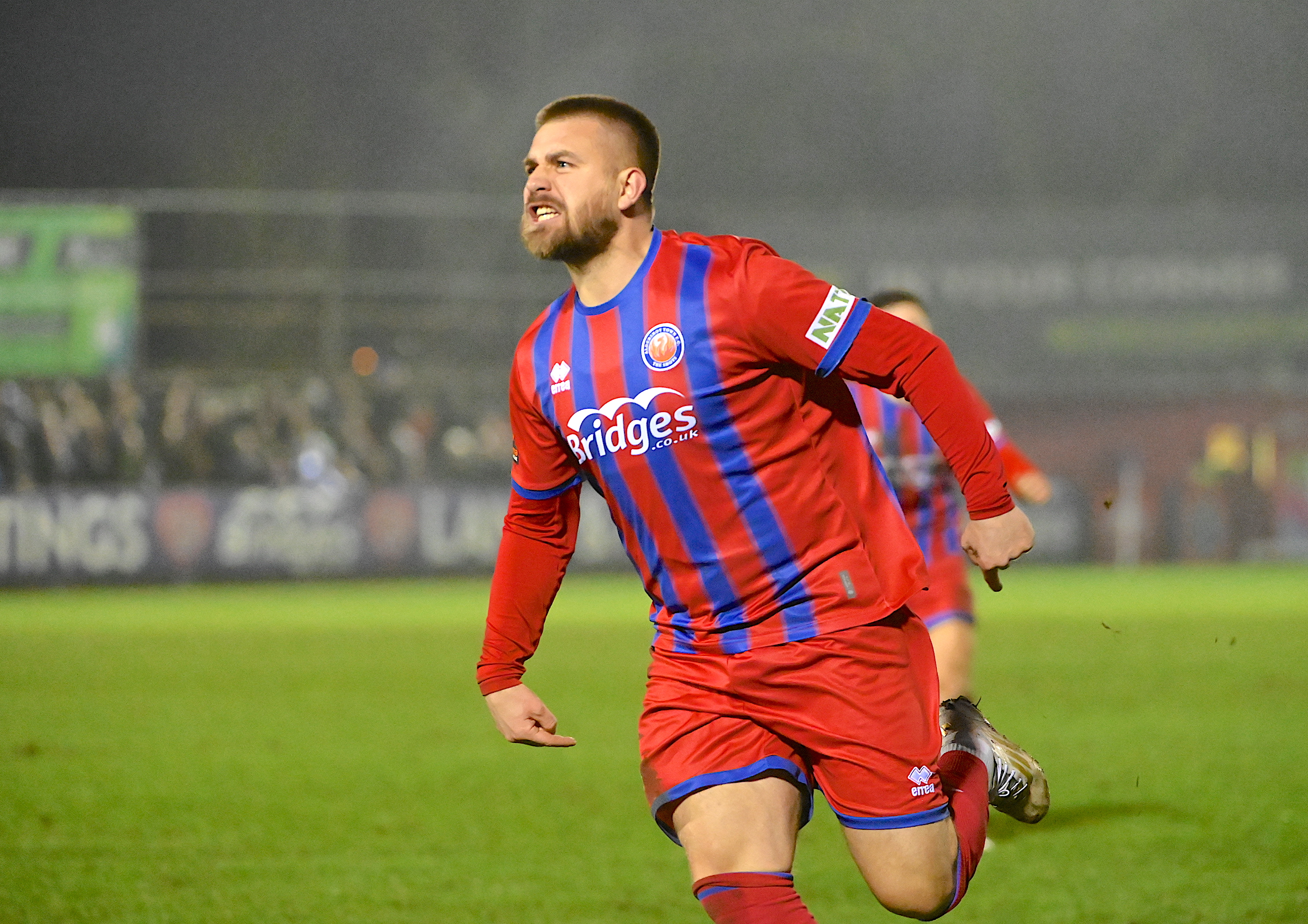
- Barrett playing for Aldershot Town in 2024

Personal information
- Full name: Joshua Lee Barrett
- Date of birth: 21 June 1998 (age 28)
- Place of birth: Oxford, England
- Height: 1.81 m (5 ft 11 in)
- Position: Midfielder

Team information
- Current team: Dorking Wanderers
- Number: 39

Youth career
- –2015: Reading

Senior career*
Years	Team	Apps	(Gls)
2015–2020	Reading	10	(0)
2018	→ Coventry City (loan)	6	(0)
2018	→ Aldershot Town (loan)	5	(0)
2020–2021	Bristol Rovers	16	(0)
2021–2024	King's Lynn Town	86	(15)
2024–2026	Aldershot Town	81	(23)
2026–	Dorking Wanderers	11	(4)

International career^{‡}
2014	Republic of Ireland U16	2	(0)
2014–2015	Republic of Ireland U17	8	(3)
2016–2017	Republic of Ireland U19	6	(1)
2016–2019	Republic of Ireland U21	3	(0)
- * Club domestic league appearances and goals as of 12:45, 31 October 2026 (UTC) ‡ National team caps and goals as of 18:22, 12 June 2019 (UTC)

Joshua Lee Barrett (born 21 June 1998) is an Irish footballer who plays for National League South club Dorking Wanderers as a midfielder. He has represented Republic of Ireland at U21 level.

== Early life ==
Barrett's parents are from Oxford. He played GAA with Eire Og as a child.

== Club career ==
=== Reading ===
Barrett signed his first professional contract with Reading in October 2015. He went on to make his senior debut for Reading on 8 March 2016, in a 3–1 defeat away to Huddersfield Town, coming on as an 84-minute substitute for Chris Gunter. On 21 December 2017 Barrett signed a new contract with Reading, until the summer of 2021, and also agreed to join EFL League Two side Coventry City on loan from 1 January 2018, until the end of the season. On 10 November 2018 Barrett signed for Aldershot Town on a month long loan. Barrett scored his first goals for Reading when he scored twice in an EFL Cup tie against Plymouth Argyle on 27 August 2019.

=== Bristol Rovers ===
On 7 January 2020, Barrett joined Bristol Rovers on a two-and-a-half-year contract for an undisclosed fee from Reading. Barrett failed to make an impact during the 2019–20 season that was prematurely ended in March 2020 due to the COVID-19 pandemic. This came after manager Ben Garner had, although praising his skill levels, criticised Barrett's fitness levels with the midfielder below the standards of the first-team.

Barrett made 9 appearances during the 20/21 league campaign, the Gas were relegated that same season. On 1 September 2021, it was announced that the club had terminated Barrett's contract to allow him to move on.

=== King's Lynn Town ===
On 13 October 2021, Barrett joined National League side King's Lynn Town. Barrett made his debut for the club that weekend, coming off of the bench in a 2–1 FA Cup Fourth qualifying round victory over Peterborough Sports, Barrett playing a part in the winning goal. Barrett opened his account for the club on 11 December with a double as second-bottom King's Lynn beat bottom side Dover Athletic by two goals to one.

=== Aldershot Town ===
On 22 January 2024, Barrett returned to Aldershot Town having previously spent time with the club on loan. The move saw him reunite with Tommy Widdrington, the manager who had brought him to King's Lynn Town, as well as signing him for both Bristol Rovers and Coventry City from his role as Head of Recruitment.

At the end of the 2024–25 season, Barrett was named as the club's player of the season award, voted for by the fans. On 11 May 2025, he scored the third goal as the Shots defeated Spennymoor Town 3–0 to win the 2024–25 FA Trophy. On 25 June 2025, he signed a new two-year deal.

On 14 May 2026, it was announced that Barrett would leave Aldershot Town after agreeing an undisclosed fee with an unnamed club.

=== Dorking Wanderers ===
On 22 May 2026, Barrett signed for National League South side, Dorking Wanderers for an undisclosed fee.

== International career ==
Barrett made his debut for the Republic of Ireland U17s against Hungary U17s in August 2014. Barrett was called up to the Republic of Ireland U21s for the first time in March 2016, making his debut as a 75th-minute substitute against Slovenia U21s on 28 March 2016.

On 28 May 2019, Barrett was called up to the Republic of Ireland U21 team for the 2019 Toulon Tournament. He started the match against Bahrain U23s and won the penalty for the winning goal.

== Career statistics ==
=== Club ===
As of match played 27 October 2026

Appearances and goals by club, season and competition
Club	Season	League			Cup		League Cup		Other		Total	
Club	Season	Division	Apps	Goals	Apps	Goals	Apps	Goals	Apps	Goals	Apps	Goals
Reading	2015–16	Championship	3	0	0	0	0	0	0	0	3	0
Reading	2016–17	Championship	0	0	0	0	0	0	0	0	0	0
Reading	2017–18	Championship	0	0	0	0	1	0	0	0	1	0
Reading	2018–19	Championship	2	0	0	0	0	0	0	0	2	0
Reading	2019–20	Championship	5	0	0	0	2	2	0	0	7	2
Reading	Total		10	0	0	0	3	2	0	0	13	2
Coventry City (loan)	2017–18	League Two	6	0	2	0	0	0	0	0	8	0
Aldershot Town (loan)	2018–19	National League	5	0	2	0	—		0	0	7	0
Bristol Rovers	2019–20	League One	7	0	0	0	0	0	1 (Note: Appearances in the EFL Trophy)	0	8	0
Bristol Rovers	2020–21	League One	9	0	1	0	0	0	1	0	11	0
Bristol Rovers	Total		16	0	1	0	0	0	2	0	19	0
King's Lynn Town	2021–22	National League	29	5	2	0	—		2 (Note: Appearance in FA Trophy)	3	33	8
King's Lynn Town	2022–23	National League North	43	7	6	1	—		2 (Note: One appearance in FA Trophy, one in National League North play-offs)	0	51	8
King's Lynn Town	2023–24	National League North	14	3	2	0	—		0	0	16	3
King's Lynn Town	Total		86	15	10	1	—		4	3	100	19
Aldershot Town	2023–24	National League	12	2	0	0	—		—		12	2
Aldershot Town	2024–25	National League	38	16	2	0	—		8 (Note: Two appearances and one goal in National League Cup, six appearances and two goals in FA Trophy)	3	48	19
Aldershot Town	2025–26	National League	31	5	1	2	—		2 (Note: One appearance in National League Cup, one in FA Trophy)	0	34	7
Aldershot Town	Total		81	23	3	2	—		10	3	94	28
Dorking Wanderers	2026–27	National League South	11	4	4	2	—		0	0	15	6
Career total			215	42	22	5	3	2	14	6	254	55

== Honours ==
Aldershot Town

- FA Trophy: 2024–25

Individual

- Aldershot Town Player of the Season: 2024–25
