= Michael Kelly (footballer, born 1997) =

Scottish footballer

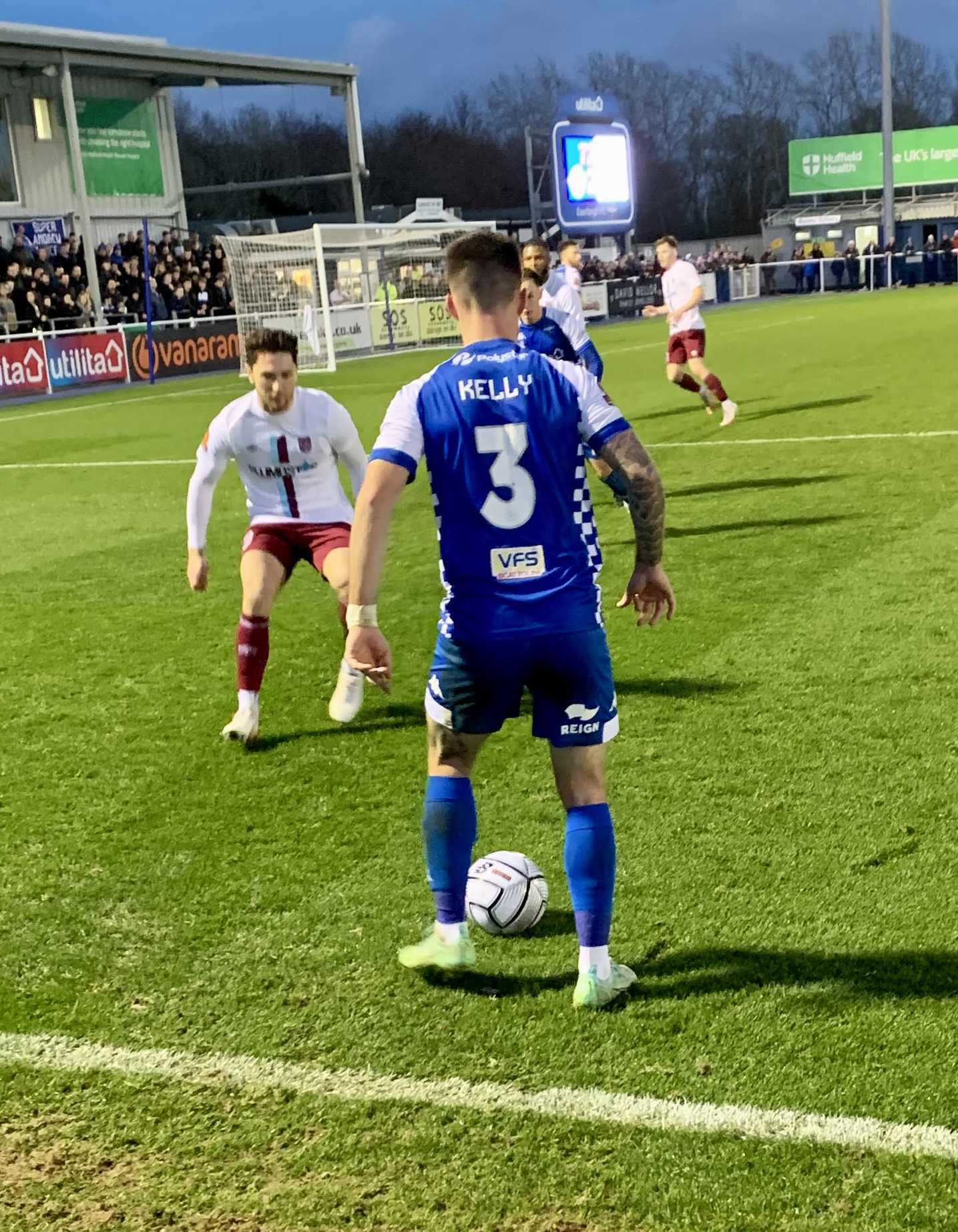

Personal information
- Full name: Michael Eamon James Kelly
- Date of birth: 3 November 1997 (age 29)
- Place of birth: Kilmarnock, Scotland
- Height: 5 ft 11 in (1.81 m)
- Position: Defender

Team information
- Current team: Spalding United

Youth career
- –2015: Aberdeen
- 2015–2016: Leicester City

Senior career*
Years	Team	Apps	(Gls)
2016–2017	Hurlford United	11	(0)
2017–2021	Bristol Rovers	27	(0)
2017–2018	→ Bath City (loan)	3	(0)
2021	→ Yeovil Town (loan)	20	(0)
2021–2023	Eastleigh	58	(2)
2023–2025	Scunthorpe United	54	(3)
2025–2026	Boston United	8	(0)
2026	→ Chester (loan)	15	(0)
2026–	Spalding United	0	(0)

International career
2011–2012	Scotland U15	4	(0)
2011–2012	Scotland U16	10	(0)
2013–2014	Scotland U17	7	(0)
- * Club domestic league appearances and goals as of 11:02, 14 January 2026 (UTC)

Michael Eamon James Kelly (born 3 November 1997) is a Scottish professional footballer who plays as a defender for National League North club Spalding United

== Club career ==
=== Early career ===
Kelly started his career at Aberdeen before moving to Leicester City in 2015. He was then released and spent time playing for Scottish Junior League side Hurlford United. In March 2017, he went on trial with Stoke City, playing twice for their under-23 side.

=== Bristol Rovers ===
On 1 July 2017, Kelly signed for League One side Bristol Rovers. In December 2017, he joined National League South side Bath City on loan and went on to make four appearances in all competitions. On 7 April 2018, Kelly made his league debut for Bristol Rovers, playing the last 13 minutes in a 1–1 draw with Charlton Athletic. In May 2020, Kelly signed a new contract with Rovers to extend his stay at the club for a further year. Kelly's time at the club ended at the conclusion of the 2020-21 season when it was announced that his contract would not be being renewed.

==== Yeovil Town (loan) ====
On 26 January 2021, Kelly joined National League side Yeovil Town on loan until the end of the 2020–21 season. On 30 January, Kelly made his Yeovil debut, playing the entirety of a 3–1 victory over Dover Athletic.

=== Eastleigh ===
On 29 June 2021, Kelly joined National League side Eastleigh on a permanent deal. On 30 April 2022, Kelly scored a first senior goal with an equalising penalty in the eleventh minute of additional time to earn a 3–3 draw with King's Lynn Town.

He was released by the club at the end of the 2022–23 season.

=== Scunthorpe United ===
On 15 May 2023, he was announced to be joining recently relegated National League North club Scunthorpe United on a two-year deal upon the expiration of his Eastleigh contract.

=== Boston United ===
On 11 June 2025, Kelly joined National League side Boston United on a two-year deal, reuniting with Pilgrims manager Graham Coughlan whom Kelly had played under at Bristol Rovers.

==== Loan to Chester ====
On 13 January 2026, Kelly joined National League North side Chester on loan until the end of the season.

=== Spalding United ===
On 7 July 2026, Kelly joined newly-promoted National League North side Spalding United.

== International career ==
Kelly has played for Scotland at under-15, under-16 and under-17 level.

== Career statistics ==
As of end of 2022–23 season

Appearances and goals by club, season and competition
Club	Season	League			FA Cup		EFL Cup		Other		Total	
Club	Season	Division	Apps	Goals	Apps	Goals	Apps	Goals	Apps	Goals	Apps	Goals
Hurlford United	2016–17	SJFA West Region Premiership	11	0	—		—		6	0	17	0
Bristol Rovers	2017–18	League One	1	0	0	0	0	0	0	0	1	0
Bristol Rovers	2018–19	League One	21	0	2	0	1	0	6 (Note: Appearances in EFL Trophy)	0	30	0
Bristol Rovers	2019–20	League One	5	0	3	0	0	0	4	0	12	0
Bristol Rovers	2020–21	League One	0	0	0	0	0	0	3	0	3	0
Bristol Rovers	Total		27	0	5	0	1	0	13	0	46	0
Bath City (loan)	2017–18	National League South	3	0	—		—		1 (Note: Appearance(s) in FA Trophy)	0	4	0
Yeovil Town (loan)	2020–21	National League	20	0	—		—		—		20	0
Eastleigh	2021–22	National League	30	1	2	0	—		2	0	34	1
Eastleigh	2022–23	National League	27	1	2	0	1		0	30	1	
Eastleigh	Total		57	2	4	0	0	0	3	0	64	2
Career total			118	2	9	0	1	0	23	0	151	2

== Honours ==
Scunthorpe United

- National League North play-offs: 2025
