= Josh Hare =

English footballer

Personal information
- Full name: Joshua Darren Hare
- Date of birth: 12 August 1994 (age 32)
- Place of birth: Canterbury, England
- Height: 6 ft 0 in (1.83 m)
- Positions: Defender; midfielder

Team information
- Current team: Faversham Town

Youth career
- –2012: Gillingham

Senior career*
Years	Team	Apps	(Gls)
2012–2016	Gillingham	2	(0)
2012	→ Whitstable Town (loan)		
2012	→ Eastbourne Borough (loan)	1	(0)
2013	→ Maidstone United (loan)		
2013	→ Lewes (loan)		
2013	→ Hastings United (loan)		
2014–2015	→ Eastbourne Borough (loan)	9	(1)
2016	→ Leatherhead (loan)	8	(0)
2016–2017	Eastbourne Borough	36	(3)
2017–2018	Maidstone United	28	(3)
2018–2019	Eastleigh	43	(5)
2019–2021	Bristol Rovers	29	(0)
2021–2022	Eastleigh	24	(1)
2022–2024	Dagenham & Redbridge	64	(2)
2024–2025	Boreham Wood	29	(0)
2025–2026	Hornchurch	35	(0)
2026–	Faversham Town	0	(0)
- * Club domestic league appearances and goals as of 21:15, 24 May 2026 (UTC)

Joshua Darren Hare (born 12 August 1994) is an English professional footballer who plays as a defender for Isthmian League South East Division club Faversham Town.

== Career ==
Hare signed his first professional contract with Gillingham in November 2012. In February 2012, he joined Isthmian League Division One South side Whitstable Town on a work-experience loan, along with Jake Hessenthaler. In January 2013, he signed for Isthmian League Division One side Maidstone United on a work experience loan. Following his loan at Maidstone, he signed for Isthmian League Premier side Lewes on another work experience loan in February 2013, along with Jake Hessenthaler. In October 2013, he signed for Hastings United on a one-month loan deal, following in the footsteps of his father who played for the club in the 1980s/90's. He signed a one-year contract with the "Gills" in May 2014, but found first-team football hard to come by and was sent on an initial one-month loan to Conference South side Eastbourne Borough. His loan was extended to 10 January but on 5 January the loan was cut short.

On 8 July 2016, having left Gillingham, Hare signed for Eastbourne Borough.

=== Bristol Rovers ===
On 12 June 2019, Hare signed for Bristol Rovers on a free transfer following the expiry of his contract at Eastleigh.

After making an impressive start to the season, Hare suffered an injury and had to be stretchered off in a league match against Gillingham on 17 September. He returned to first-team action on 7 March 2020 in a 3–1 defeat to Southend United and featured three days later in a 2–0 win against Sunderland, the last match before the league's abandonment.

He scored his first goal for the club on 18 November 2020, scoring a 90th-minute winner in a 4–3 victory over Chelsea U21 in the final match of the group stage of the EFL Trophy, with Hare's goal seeing the Gas qualify for the knockout stages.

At the end of the 2020–21 season, a season that saw the Gas relegated bottom of the league, Hare was announced to be one of the players to not be having his contract renewed.

=== Eastleigh ===
On 29 June 2021, Hare returned to National League side Eastleigh on a permanent deal. On 14 September, he scored his first goal back at the club with the fourth in a 4–1 thrashing of Dover Athletic having already set up his side's second goal.

=== Dagenham & Redbridge ===
On 19 February 2022, he signed for National League divisional rivals Dagenham & Redbridge for an undisclosed fee. Manager Daryl McMahon stated that Hare was "a player that I've admired for a long time".

In May 2024, it was announced that Hare would depart the club upon the expiration of his contract.

=== Boreham Wood ===
On 6 June 2024, Hare joined recently relegated National League South side Boreham Wood.

=== Hornchurch ===
In May 2025, Hare joined National League South side Hornchurch.

=== Faversham Town ===
On 24 May 2026, Hare joined Isthmian League South East Division club Faversham Town.

== Personal life ==
Hare is the son of former Gillingham youth team manager Darren Hare, the nephew of former Gillingham player and manager Andy Hessenthaler, and the cousin of another former Gills player, Jake Hessenthaler.

== Career statistics ==
As of end of 2024–25 season

Appearances and goals by club, season and competition
Club	Season	League			FA Cup		League Cup		Other		Total	
Club	Season	Division	Apps	Goals	Apps	Goals	Apps	Goals	Apps	Goals	Apps	Goals
Gillingham	2012–13	League Two	0	0	0	0	0	0	0	0	0	0
Gillingham	2013–14	League One	0	0	0	0	0	0	0	0	0	0
Gillingham	2014–15	League One	2	0	0	0	1	0	0	0	3	0
Gillingham	2015–16	League One	0	0	0	0	0	0	0	0	0	0
Gillingham	Total		2	0	0	0	1	0	0	0	3	0
Eastbourne Borough (loan)	2012–13	Conference South	1	0	—		—		1 (Note: Appearance(s) in the Sussex Senior Cup)	0	2	0
Eastbourne Borough (loan)	2014–15	Conference South	9	1	—		—		2 (Note: One appearance in the FA Trophy, one appearance in the Sussex Senior Cup)	0	11	1
Leatherhead (loan)	2015–16	IL Premier Division	8	0	—		—		—		8	0
Eastbourne Borough	2016–17	National League South	36	3	5	0	—		7 (Note: Two appearances in the FA Trophy, four appearances and one goal in the Sussex Senior Cup, one appearance in the Sussex Community Shield)	1	48	4
Maidstone United	2017–18	National League	28	3	2	0	—		3 (Note: Appearance(s) in the FA Trophy)	0	33	3
Eastleigh	2018–19	National League	43	5	0	0	—		3 (Note: Two appearances in the National League Play-Offs, one appearance in the FA Trophy)	0	46	5
Bristol Rovers	2019–20	League One	10	0	0	0	2	0	0	0	12	0
Bristol Rovers	2020–21	League One	19	0	2	1	1	0	5 (Note: Appearance(s) in EFL Trophy.)	1	27	2
Bristol Rovers	Total		29	0	2	1	3	0	5	1	39	2
Eastleigh	2021–22	National League	24	1	2	0	—		2	1	28	2
Dagenham & Redbridge	2021–22	National League	10	0	—		—		—		10	0
Dagenham & Redbridge	2022–23	National League	37	1	4	0	—		2	0	43	1
Dagenham & Redbridge	2023–24	National League	17	1	1	0	—		0	0	18	1
Dagenham & Redbridge	Total		64	2	5	0	—		2	0	71	2
Boreham Wood	2024–25	National League South	29	0	2	0	—		2	0	33	0
Career total			273	15	18	1	4	0	27	3	322	19

== Honours ==
Boreham Wood

- National League South play-offs: 2025

Hornchurch

- National League South play-offs: 2026

Individual

- National League Team of the Year: 2018–19
