= Jayden Mitchell-Lawson =

English footballer (born 1999)

Personal information
- Full name: Jayden Joshua Joseph Mitchell-Lawson
- Date of birth: 17 September 1999 (age 27)
- Place of birth: Basingstoke, England
- Height: 5 ft 6 in (1.68 m)
- Positions: Midfielder; winger

Team information
- Current team: Maidenhead United
- Number: 11

Youth career
- –2016: Swindon Town
- 2016–2019: Derby County

Senior career*
| Years | Team | Apps | (Gls) |
| 2019–2021 | Derby County | 2 | (0) |
| 2020 | → Bristol Rovers (loan) | 9 | (2) |
| 2020 | → Bristol Rovers (loan) | 5 | (0) |
| 2021–2022 | Swindon Town | 24 | (0) |
| 2022–2023 | Ayr United | 28 | (2) |
| 2023– | Maidenhead United | 100 | (6) |
- * Club domestic league appearances and goals as of 16:26, 26 September 2026 (UTC)

Jayden Joshua Joseph Mitchell-Lawson (born 17 September 1999) is an English footballer who plays as a midfielder or winger for National League South club Maidenhead United.

== Early life ==
Mitchell-Lawson was born in Basingstoke.

== Career ==
=== Derby County ===
Having started his career at Swindon Town's academy, Mitchell-Lawson joined Derby County in January 2016. Mitchell-Lawson made his senior debut on 13 March 2019, coming on as a substitute in the 83rd minute of a 0–0 draw with Stoke City.

==== Bristol Rovers (loan) ====
He joined Bristol Rovers on loan in January 2020. In his fifth match for the club, he scored his first senior goal, levelling the scores in impressive fashion in an eventual 3–1 defeat to Wycombe Wanderers. After a successful loan spell before the early postponement of the season, Mitchell-Lawson returned to the Gas on 8 August 2020, signing on loan for the season. After making just seven appearances since returning on loan, he returned to his parent club on 17 December 2020. He was released by Derby at the end of the 2020–21 season.

=== Swindon Town return ===
Mitchell-Lawson returned to Swindon Town on 19 August 2021 on a free transfer signing a one-year contract. Mitchell-Lawson was released at the end of the 2021–22 season following defeat in the EFL League Two play-offs. He made thirty appearances, scoring one goal.

=== Ayr United ===
Scottish Championship club Ayr United signed Mitchell-Lawson in June 2022, following his departure from Swindon Town. He left the club by mutual consent on 14 July 2023, having scored twice in 35 appearances.

=== Maidenhead United ===
Mitchell-Lawson signed for Maidenhead United on 17 July 2023.

== Career statistics ==
As of 26 September 2026

Appearances and goals by club, season and competition
| Club | Season | League | | | FA Cup | | League Cup | | Other | | Total | |
| Club | Season | Division | Apps | Goals | Apps | Goals | Apps | Goals | Apps | Goals | Apps | Goals |
|---|---|---|---|---|---|---|---|---|---|---|---|---|
| Derby County | 2018–19 | EFL Championship | 1 | 0 | 0 | 0 | 0 | 0 | 0 | 0 | 1 | 0 |
| Derby County | 2019–20 | EFL Championship | 0 | 0 | 0 | 0 | 1 | 0 | 0 | 0 | 1 | 0 |
| Derby County | 2020–21 | EFL Championship | 1 | 0 | 0 | 0 | 0 | 0 | 0 | 0 | 1 | 0 |
| Derby County | Total | | 2 | 0 | 0 | 0 | 1 | 0 | 0 | 0 | 3 | 0 |
| Bristol Rovers (loan) | 2019–20 | EFL League One | 10 | 2 | 0 | 0 | 0 | 0 | 1 (Note: Appearance(s) in EFL Trophy) | 0 | 11 | 2 |
| Bristol Rovers (loan) | 2020–21 | EFL League One | 5 | 0 | 0 | 0 | 1 | 0 | 1 | 0 | 7 | 0 |
| Total | | | 15 | 2 | 0 | 0 | 1 | 0 | 2 | 0 | 18 | 2 |
| Swindon Town | 2021–22 | EFL League Two | 24 | 0 | 2 | 0 | 0 | 0 | 4 | 1 | 30 | 1 |
| Ayr United | 2022–23 | Scottish Championship | 28 | 2 | 3 | 0 | 3 | 0 | 2 (Note: Appearances in Scottish Premiership play-offs) | 0 | 35 | 2 |
| Maidenhead United | 2023–24 | National League | 36 | 3 | 2 | 0 | 0 | 0 | 0 | 0 | 38 | 3 |
| Maidenhead United | 2024–25 | National League | 11 | 0 | 2 | 0 | 0 | 0 | 0 | 0 | 13 | 0 |
| Maidenhead United | 2025–26 | National League South | 44 | 2 | 0 | 0 | 0 | 0 | 0 | 0 | 44 | 2 |
| Maidenhead United | 2026–27 | National League South | 9 | 1 | 1 | 0 | 0 | 0 | 0 | 0 | 10 | 1 |
| Maidenhead United | Total | | 100 | 6 | 5 | 0 | 0 | 0 | 0 | 0 | 105 | 6 |
| Career total | | | 169 | 10 | 10 | 0 | 5 | 0 | 8 | 1 | 192 | 11 |
