= Lucas Tomlinson =

English footballer (born 2000)

Personal information
- Full name: Lucas George Tomlinson
- Date of birth: 6 November 2000 (age 26)
- Place of birth: Bristol, England
- Height: 1.73 m (5 ft 8 in)
- Position: Midfielder

Team information
- Current team: Bristol Manor Farm

Youth career
- 2011–2019: Bristol Rovers

Senior career*
Years	Team	Apps	(Gls)
2019–2022	Bristol Rovers	1	(0)
2020–2021	→ Bath City (loan)	5	(0)
2021	→ Torquay United (loan)	2	(0)
2021–2022	→ Gloucester City (loan)	31	(7)
2022	Gloucester City	15	(0)
2022–2023	Salisbury	16	(0)
2023	Yate Town	7	(3)
2023–2024	Barry Town United	27	(1)
2024–2026	Yate Town	65	(15)
2026	→ Bristol Manor Farm (loan)	2	(0)
2026–	Bristol Manor Farm	0	(0)
- * Club domestic league appearances and goals as of 8 June 2026

Lucas George Tomlinson (born 6 November 2000) is an English professional footballer who plays as a midfielder for Southern League Division One South club Bristol Manor Farm.

== Early and personal life ==
Tomlinson was born in Bristol. He attended Easton CE(VA) Primary School, now Easton CE Academy.

== Club career ==
=== Bristol Rovers ===
Having joined their academy at the age of 10, Tomlinson signed a professional contract with Bristol Rovers in the summer of 2019. Tomlinson made his debut for Rovers on 24 September 2019 as a substitute in a 2–1 EFL Trophy victory over Chelsea Under-21s. He made his league debut on 14 December 2019, coming on as a second-half substitute for Tom Nichols in a 2–1 victory at Ipswich Town. He signed a new contract with Bristol Rovers in June 2020. On 2 June 2021, Tomlinson signed a new one-year contract with the League Two side. Tomlinson was released at the end of the 2021–22 season.

==== Bath City (loan) ====
On 13 October 2020, Tomlinson joined National League South side Bath City on loan until 2 January 2021 and made his debut later that day in the FA Cup as Bath defeated Slough Town 1–0.

==== Torquay United (loan) ====
On 24 April 2021, Tomlinson joined National League side Torquay United on loan for the remainder of the season, as Torquay pushed for promotion. He made his debut later that day as a 56' minute substitute as Torquay came from 2–0 down against Notts County to draw 2–2 in the 98th minute of the match and move to the top of the league.

=== Gloucester City ===
On 1 October 2021, Tomlinson joined Gloucester City on a youth loan deal. His move to the National League North side would see him managed by former-Rovers youth-team boss Lee Mansell. He made his debut the following day as his side were on the wrong-end of an FA Cup upset as they lost 1–0 at Isthmian Premier Division side Folkestone Invicta. On 12 November, his loan was extended until January 2022. On 4 January 2022, the loan was again extended, this time until the end of the 2021–22 season. On 19 February 2022, Tomlinson scored the first senior goal of his career in a 2–2 draw with Darlington. Tomlinson's goalscoring form continued and he was awarded Gloucester City's Player of the Month award for March. Tomlinson ended the season having won the Gloucester City Young Player of the Season award.

On 29 July 2022, Tomlinson returned to Gloucester City on a permanent basis following his release from Bristol Rovers. On 11 November 2022, Tomlinson departed the club by mutual consent.

=== Salisbury ===
Following his departure from Gloucester City, Tomlinson joined Southern Football League Premier Division South club Salisbury.

=== Yate Town ===
In March 2023, Tomlinson signed for Yate Town.

=== Barry Town United ===
On 21 June 2023, Tomlinson signed for Cymru Premier club Barry Town United.

=== Yate Town ===
In June 2024, Tomlinson returned to Yate Town.

=== Bristol Manor Farm ===
In June 2026, following a short loan spell the previous season that was cut short by injury, Tomlinson joined Southern League Division One South club Bristol Manor Farm on a permanent basis.

== Career statistics ==
As of end of 2021–22 season

Appearances and goals by club, season and competition
Club	Season	League			FA Cup		League Cup		Other		Total	
Club	Season	Division	Apps	Goals	Apps	Goals	Apps	Goals	Apps	Goals	Apps	Goals
Bristol Rovers	2019–20	League One	1	0	0	0	0	0	4 (Note: Appearance(s) in EFL Trophy)	0	5	0
Bristol Rovers	2020–21	League One	0	0	0	0	0	0	0	0	0	0
Bristol Rovers	2021–22	League Two	0	0	0	0	0	0	0	0	0	0
Bristol Rovers	Total		1	0	0	0	0	0	4	0	5	0
Bath City (loan)	2020–21	National League South	5	0	2	0	—		0	0	7	0
Torquay United (loan)	2020–21	National League	2	0	—		—		0	0	2	0
Gloucester City (loan)	2021–22	National League North	31	7	1	0	—		1 (Note: Appearance(s) in FA Trophy)	0	33	7
Career total			39	7	3	0	0	0	5	0	47	7

== Honours ==
Individual

- Gloucester City Young Player of the Year: 2021–22
