= Anssi Jaakkola =

Finnish footballer (born 1987)

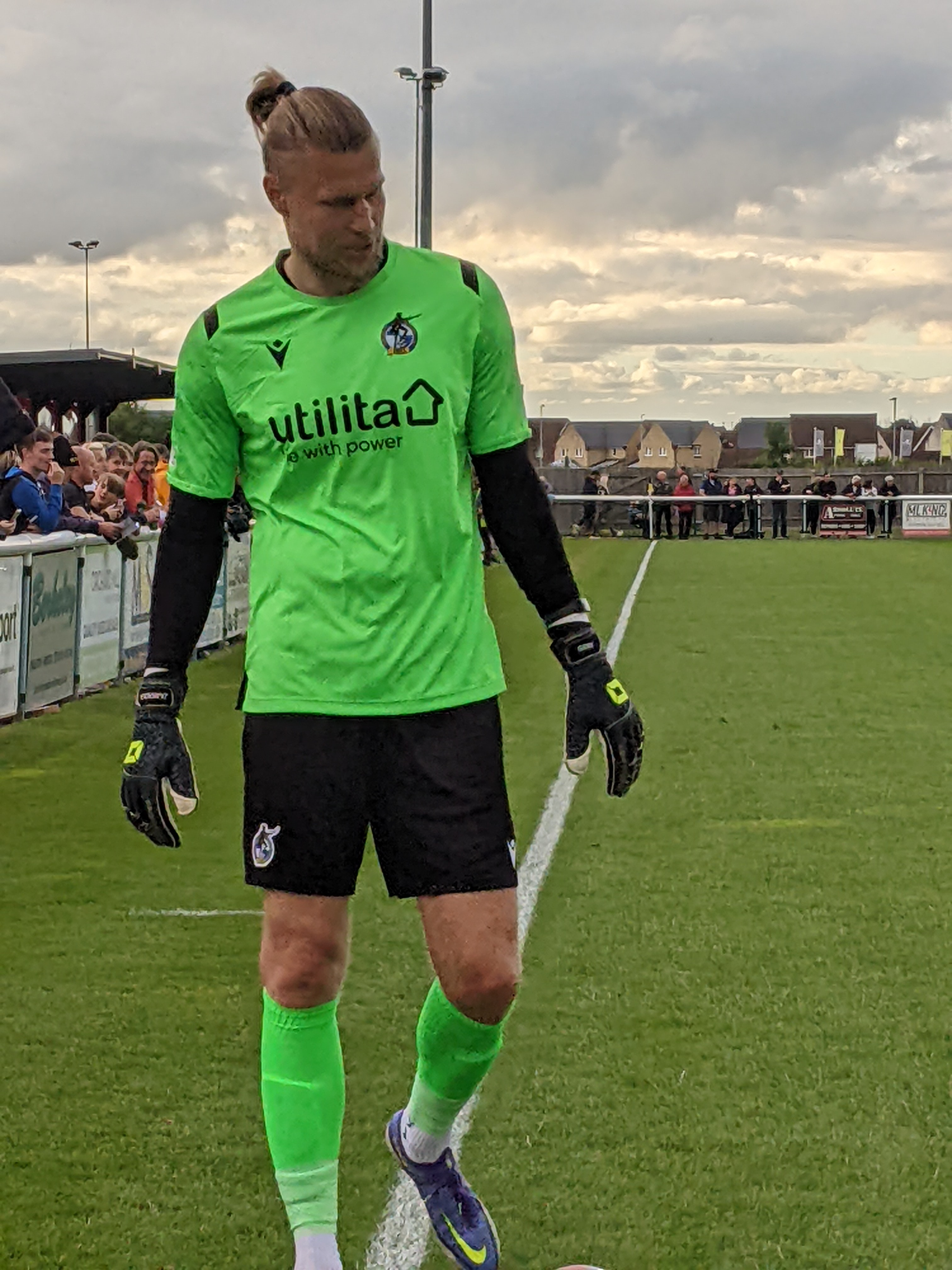
- Jaakkola with Bristol Rovers in 2022

Personal information
- Full name: Anssi Valtteri Jaakkola
- Date of birth: 13 March 1987 (age 39)
- Place of birth: Kemi, Finland
- Height: 1.93 m (6 ft 4 in)
- Position: Goalkeeper

Team information
- Current team: Southend United (goalkeeping coach)
- Number: 32

Youth career
- –2003: FC-88
- 2003–2004: TP-47

Senior career*
Years	Team	Apps	(Gls)
2004–2006	TP-47	17	(0)
2007–2010	Siena	1	(0)
2009	→ Colligiana (loan)	7	(0)
2010–2011	Slavia Prague	2	(0)
2011–2013	Kilmarnock	14	(0)
2013–2016	Ajax Cape Town	78	(0)
2016–2019	Reading	20	(0)
2019–2023	Bristol Rovers	46	(0)
2025–	Southend United	0	(0)
Total		185	(0)

International career
2007–2009	Finland U21	11	(0)
2011–2021	Finland	3	(0)
Medal record
Men's football
Kilmarnock
First place	Scottish League Cup	2012
Ajax Cape Town
Second place	Nedbank Cup	2015
First place	MTN 8	2015
Reading
Third place	EFL Championship	2017
- * Club domestic league appearances and goals

Anssi Valtteri Jaakkola (born 13 March 1987) is a Finnish former professional footballer who played as a goalkeeper. He is currently goalkeeping coach at Southend United.

Jaakkola was born in Kemi. He began his senior club career playing for TP-47 aged 17 in 2004, before signing with Serie A side Siena in 2007.

Jaakkola made his international debut for Finland in June 2011, at the age of 24. He was nominated for all 10 of Finland's UEFA Euro 2020 qualification matches but did not gain any appearances when Finland national team secured its first ever place in European Football Championship tournament's group stage.

== Club career ==
=== Early career ===
Jaakkola previously played for TP-47 and FC-88. In the January 2007 window, Jaakkola signed a three-and-a-half-year contract with Serie A side Siena. He made his Serie A debut by substituting Dimitrios Eleftheropoulos in the 2007–08 season final matchday, a 2–2 home draw with Palermo. In 2009, he was loaned to V.F. Colligiana in Lega Pro Seconda Divisione. He moved to Slavia Prague on free transfer in July 2010, signing a two-year contract with the option of a further year.

=== Kilmarnock ===
In January 2011, Jaakkola left Slavia for Scottish Premier League club Kilmarnock, under the management of fellow Finn Mixu Paatelainen. He made his debut as a substitute on 12 February against Hibernian. He then made his first start on 26 February against St Mirren. He left Kilmarnock when his contract expired in the summer of 2013.

=== Ajax Cape Town ===
Jaakkola joined South African Premier Soccer League club Ajax Cape Town in August 2013. On 22 September 2013 Jaakkola made his debut in the Premier Soccer League in a match against Polokwane when he came in as a substitute for Brandon Peterson on 57th minute of the match.

=== Reading ===
On 11 July 2016, Jaakkola signed a two-year contract with Reading. Jaakkola made his competitive debut for Reading on 8 August 2016, playing the full 90 minutes of Reading's 2–0 EFL Cup victory over Plymouth Argyle. On 7 November 2018 he was awarded as Reading supporters October player of the month. He was released by Reading at the end of the 2018–19 season.

=== Bristol Rovers ===
After his contract at Reading expired, Jaakkola joined League One side Bristol Rovers. Jaakola made over twenty appearances in his debut season for Rovers before his season was cut short by an injury on New Years Day against Milton Keynes Dons. After the season was cut short, Jaakola signed a new contract on 3 July 2020 until the end of the 2021–22 season with an option for a further year. On 8 December 2020, Jaakkola was taken off with an Achilles injury in an EFL Trophy match against Leyton Orient and was originally set to be out of contention for a few weeks, but he was still yet to return in February 2021 when new manager Joey Barton gave an update stating that Jaakkola was 'about a week away' from being able to return to action. He made his return on 27 March 2021 in a 1–0 home defeat to Sunderland as Rovers continued to fight against relegation.

Jaakkola featured in the first two League Two matches of the 2021–22 season before the return of his recurring Achilles injury forced him out of action. In early September, manager Barton estimated that he would be injured for another week, however Jaakkola needed injections in the Achilles and in October it was estimated that he would be out of action until November in order to allow the injury to fully heal with the hope to solve the problem for good. With James Belshaw having impressed in Jaakkola's absence, upon his return from injury Jaakkola found himself on the bench before a slight knock to Belshaw at the end of January allowed Jaakkola the opportunity to return to first-team football. Following Rovers' promotion back to League One at the end of the 2021–22 season,

== International career ==
On 30 August 2010 he was selected to represent Finland for European Championship qualification matches against Moldova and Netherlands as a replacement for injured Peter Enckelman. However, he didn't earn any caps. He made his national team debut on 7 June 2011, conceding five goals against Sweden in a 5–0 away loss. He gained his second appearance in the national team on 7 June 2017 when Markku Kanerva announced that Jaakkola would replace Lukáš Hrádecký in a friendly match against Liechtenstein.

In May 2021, Jaakkola was named in the provisional-26 man squad for the upcoming delayed UEFA Euro 2020 Championship. Jaakkola was a member of the Finnish squad at the UEFA Euro 2020 tournament but remained as an unused substitute for Lukáš Hrádecký. Finland was placed 3rd in Group B following a 2–0 defeat to Belgium on 21 June 2021.

== Coaching career ==
Jaakkola stepped up into the role of goalkeeping coach in pre-season following the departure of goalkeeping coach Tony Warner to Jaakkola's former club Reading. Throughout the 2022–23 season, he balanced his coaching role with being the back-up goalkeeper, however the January loan signing of Ellery Balcombe allowed him to focus more on his new role. He was offered the position of permanent goalkeeping coach at the end of the season. Following the conclusion of the 2023–24 season, he announced his departure from the club.

In September 2024, Jaakkola was announced to have joined National League side Southend United as goalkeeping coach. The move saw him reunite with manager Kevin Maher, whom Jaakkola had previously worked with at Bristol Rovers.

== Personal life ==
Jaakkola has two daughters and one son. His wife is Scottish.

== Career statistics ==
=== Club ===
As of 10 January 2023

Appearances and goals by club, season and competition
Club	Season	League			National cup		League cup		Other		Total	
Club	Season	Division	Apps	Goals	Apps	Goals	Apps	Goals	Apps	Goals	Apps	Goals
TP-47	2005	Veikkausliiga	3	0	0	0	—		—		3	0
TP-47	2006	Ykkönen	14	0	0	0	—		—		14	0
TP-47	Total		17	0	0	0	0	0	0	0	17	0
Siena	2006–07	Serie A	0	0	0	0	—		—		0	0
Siena	2007–08	Serie A	1	0	0	0	—		—		1	0
Siena	2008–09	Serie A	0	0	0	0	—		—		0	0
Siena	2009–10	Serie A	0	0	0	0	—		—		0	0
Siena	Total		1	0	0	0	0	0	0	0	1	0
Colligiana (loan)	2008–09	Lega Pro Seconda Divisione	7	0	0	0	—		—		7	0
Slavia Prague	2010–11	Czech First League	2	0	2	0	—		—		4	0
Kilmarnock	2010–11	Scottish Premier League	8	0	0	0	0	0	—		8	0
Kilmarnock	2011–12	Scottish Premier League	5	0	0	0	1	0	—		6	0
Kilmarnock	2012–13	Scottish Premier League	0	0	0	0	0	0	—		0	0
Kilmarnock	Total		13	0	0	0	1	0	0	0	14	0
Ajax Cape Town	2013–14	South African Premier Division	24	0	0	0	1	0	—		25	0
Ajax Cape Town	2014–15	South African Premier Division	28	0	4	0	2	0	—		34	0
Ajax Cape Town	2015–16	South African Premier Division	26	0	1	0	1	0	4 (Note: Appearances in 8 Cup)	0	32	0
Ajax Cape Town	Total		78	0	5	0	4	0	4	0	91	0
Reading	2016–17	Championship	0	0	0	0	3	0	—		3	0
Reading	2017–18	Championship	5	0	3	0	3	0	—		11	0
Reading	2018–19	Championship	15	0	1	0	0	0	—		16	0
Reading	Total		20	0	4	0	6	0	0	0	30	0
Reading U23	2016–17	—			—		—		3 (Note: Appearances in EFL Trophy)	0	3	0
Bristol Rovers	2019–20	League One	21	0	3	0	2	0	0	0	26	0
Bristol Rovers	2020–21	League One	21	0	2	0	0	0	1	0	24	0
Bristol Rovers	2021–22	League Two	4	0	0	0	0	0	0	0	4	0
Bristol Rovers	2022–23	League One	0	0	0	0	0	0	6	0	6	0
Bristol Rovers	Total		46	0	5	0	2	0	7	0	60	0
Career total			184	0	16	0	13	0	14	0	227	0

=== International ===
As of match played on 26 March 2018.

National team	Year	Competitive		Friendly		Total	
National team	Year	Apps	Goals	Apps	Goals	Apps	Goals
Finland	2011	1 (Note: Appearance in the UEFA Euro 2012 qualifying.)	0	0	0	1	0
Finland	2017	0	0	1	0	1	0
Finland	2018	0	0	1	0	1	0
Total		1	0	2	0	3	0

== Honours ==
Kilmarnock

- Scottish League Cup: 2011–12

Ajax Cape Town

- MTN 8: 2015

Bristol Rovers

- EFL League Two third-place promotion: 2021–22

Individual

- Ajax Cape Town Player of the Year: 2014
