= Wael al-Qadi =

Jordanian association football executive

Wael Al-Qadi
- وائل القاضي
- Born: Wael Al-Qadi; 25 November 1969 (age 56); Jordan
- Citizenship: Jordanian
- Education: Westminster School, Westminster, London
- Alma mater: Boston University, Boston, Massachusetts
- Occupation: football executive
- Known for: President of Bristol Rovers
- Relatives: Al-Qadi family

Wael Abdulkader Al-Qadi (born 25 November 1969 in Jordan) is a Jordanian football executive, best known as the current club president of English club Bristol Rovers and a member of the Al-Qadi family.

== Biography ==
=== Early life and education ===
A member of the Al-Qadi family, who founded the Arab Jordan Investment Bank in Amman, Jordan, Wael was educated at Westminster School in London. While at school in the UK capital in the early 1980s, he began regularly attending Chelsea matches. He earned a degree in Computer Science with Business Administration at Boston University, graduating in 1991.

=== Involvement in football ===
Al-Qadi became vice-chairman of the Asian Football Development Project in 2011, an executive board member of the Jordan Football Association in 2014, an executive board member of the FIFA U-17 Women's World Cup Jordan 2016, and was a member of the campaign team behind Prince Ali bin Hussein's campaign for the presidency of FIFA at the FIFA Extraordinary Congress in February 2016.

==== Bristol Rovers ====
He and his family purchased Bristol Rovers in February 2016. The club were promoted for a second consecutive season in May 2016 with a last minute winner on the final day of the season. In 2017, Dwane Sports group announced the acquisition of a 28-acre site in Almondsbury called The Colony which would become the new training ground for the club. The site remained undeveloped until June 2020 when work began with the aim for the club to move in for the start of the 2020–21 season.

In June 2020, following the death of his father Abdulkadir, Wael reached an agreement with the other members of his family to purchase their shares and gain full control of the club, ten percent remaining with his brother Samer. In addition to this, Wael capitalised the debt owed to Dwane Sports by the football club totalling £18.4 million and £16.4 million of debt owed to the club.

In December 2021, a man was banned from matches for sixteen weeks after racially abusing al-Qadi from an anonymous Twitter account following a 1–1 draw with Barrow. The 2021–22 season saw a second promotion since al-Qadi's involvement with the club, a remarkable 7–0 victory over Scunthorpe United on the final day of the season seeing Rovers move into the final automatic promotion spot ahead of Northampton Town on goals scored, immediately bouncing back from relegation the previous season.

On 3 August 2023, Hussain AlSaeed purchased a controlling 55% share in Dwane Sports, becoming co-owner of Bristol Rovers and joining the club as chairman. The change in ownership structure saw al-Qadi remain on as club president and all debt owed to Dwane Sports being capitalised.

On 22 November 2024, the club announced that an agreement had been reached for Hussain AlSaeed to acquire all 45% of shares owned by both Wael and his brother Samer. The acquisition would be completed over an eighteen-month period with al-Qadi remaining as club president over the time period.
