= Luke Russe =

English footballer (born 1999)

Personal information
- Full name: Luke Cameron Russe
- Date of birth: 19 July 1999 (age 27)
- Place of birth: Bristol, England
- Position: Midfielder

Team information
- Current team: Salisbury
- Number: 8

Youth career
- Bristol Rovers

Senior career*
Years	Team	Apps	(Gls)
2017–2020	Bristol Rovers	3	(0)
2019	→ Gloucester City (loan)	9	(1)
2019	→ Gloucester City (loan)	13	(2)
2020	→ Chippenham Town (loan)	10	(0)
2020–2023	Chippenham Town	99	(7)
2023–2026	Bath City	113	(4)
2026–	Salisbury	0	(0)
- * Club domestic league appearances and goals as of 17:19, 25 April 2026 (UTC)

Luke Cameron Russe (born 19 July 1999) is an English footballer who plays as a defensive midfielder for National League South club Salisbury.

== Career ==
=== Bristol Rovers ===
Russe began his career in the youth academy at Bristol Rovers at Under-10 level. In July 2017, he joined the first team during a pre-season camp in Portugal.

On 29 August 2017, he made his professional debut replacing Byron Moore in the 71st minute of a 5–1 EFL Trophy victory against Wycombe Wanderers. On 31 October, he played the full 90 minutes in a 3–1 defeat to West Ham United Under-23s in the same competition. He made his league debut for the club when on 3 March 2018, he started in a 1–0 away victory to MK Dons before being replaced by Ryan Sweeney in the 75th minute of the game. He went on to make two more league appearances that season, coming off the bench against Fleetwood Town and Southend United.

Russe appeared in all 3 of the EFL Trophy group matches coming off the bench against West Ham Under-23s and Yeovil Town before playing the full 90 minutes against Exeter City.

==== Gloucester City (loan) ====
On 25 January 2019, Russe joined Gloucester City on a one-month loan deal. Russe made his debut the following day in a 0–0 home draw to Bath City where he played the full match. On 21 February, Russe extended his loan deal until the end of the season.

==== Chippenham Town (loan) ====
In January 2020 he joined Chippenham Town on loan.

=== Chippenham Town ===
On 3 August 2020, Russe joined Chippenham Town on a permanent deal. He made his debut on 3 October 2020 as Chippenham beat Poole Town on penalties after drawing 2-2 in the FA Cup, a game that saw Russe score his penalty in the shootout.

Russe was awarded the National League South Goal of the Season award for his impressive strike in a 1–0 victory over Weymouth.

=== Bath City ===
On 7 June 2023, Russe signed for Bath City.

=== Salisbury ===
On 22 June 2026, Russe returned to the National League South following Bath City's relegation, joining Salisbury.

== Career statistics ==
As of end of 2025–26 season

Appearances and goals by club, season and competition
Club	Season	League			FA Cup		EFL Cup		Other		Total	
Club	Season	Division	Apps	Goals	Apps	Goals	Apps	Goals	Apps	Goals	Apps	Goals
Bristol Rovers	2017–18	League One	3	0	0	0	0	0	2 (Note: Appearances in EFL Trophy)	0	5	0
Bristol Rovers	2018–19	League One	0	0	0	0	0	0	3	0	3	0
Bristol Rovers	Bristol Rovers total		3	0	0	0	0	0	5	0	8	0
Gloucester City (loan)	2018–19	National League South	9	1	0	0	—		0	0	9	1
Gloucester City (loan)	2019–20	National League North	13	2	3	0	—		1 (Note: Appearance(s) in FA Trophy)	0	17	2
Chippenham Town (loan)	2019–20	National League South	10	0	—		—		—		10	0
Chippenham Town	2020–21	National League South	14	0	3	0	—		1	0	18	0
Chippenham Town	2021–22	National League South	40	4	3	0	—		3 (Note: One appearance in FA Trophy, two appearances in National League South play-offs)	0	46	4
Chippenham Town	2022–23	National League South	45	3	6	1	—		2	0	53	4
Chippenham Town	Chippenham Town total		109	7	12	1	—		6	0	127	8
Bath City	2023–24	National League South	37	0	3	0	—		4 (Note: Two appearances in FA Trophy, two appearances in Somerset Premier Cup)	0	44	0
Bath City	2024–25	National League South	38	4	3	0	—		2 (Note: One appearance in FA Trophy, one appearance in Somerset Premier Cup)	0	43	4
Bath City	2025–26	National League South	38	0	1	0	—		5 (Note: Three appearances in FA Trophy, two appearances in Somerset Premier Cup)	0	44	0
Bath City	Bath City total		113	4	7	0	—		11	0	131	4
Career total			247	14	22	1	0	0	23	0	292	15
