= 2022–23 Plymouth Argyle F.C. season =

English football club season

Plymouth Argyle
2022–23 season
- Owner: Simon Hallett
- Chairman: Simon Hallett
- Manager: Steven Schumacher
- Stadium: Home Park
- League One: 1st (promoted)
- FA Cup: First round
- EFL Cup: First round
- EFL Trophy: Runners-up
- Top goalscorer: League: Ryan Hardie (13); All: Ryan Hardie (17)
Home colours	Away colours	Third colours

The 2022–23 season is the 137th season in the existence of Plymouth Argyle Football Club and the club's third consecutive season in League One. In addition to the league, they also competed in the 2022–23 FA Cup, the 2022–23 EFL Cup and the 2022–23 EFL Trophy.

== First-team squad ==
As of 12 July 2022

Note: Flags indicate national team as has been defined under FIFA eligibility rules. Players may hold more than one non-FIFA nationality.

No.	Name	Nat.	Position(s)	Date of birth (age)	Apps.	Goals	Year signed	Signed from	Transfer fee
Goalkeepers
1	Michael Cooper	(England)	GK	8 October 1999 (age 26)	142	0	2017	Academy	Trainee
25	Callum Burton	(England)	GK	15 August 1996 (age 29)	30	0	2021	(England) Cambridge United	Free
32	Adam Parkes	(England)	GK	30 November 1999 (age 26)	0	0	2022	(England) Watford	Free
Defenders
2	James Bolton	(England)	RB/CB	13 August 1994 (age 31)	22	1	2021	(England) Portsmouth	Undisclosed
3	Macaulay Gillesphey	(England)	CB	24 November 1995 (age 30)	87	4	2021	(Australia) Brisbane Roar	Free
5	James Wilson	(Wales)	CB	26 February 1989 (age 37)	90	1	2021	(England) Ipswich Town	Free
6	Dan Scarr	(England)	CB	24 December 1994 (age 31)	78	4	2021	(England) Walsall	Free
17	Bali Mumba	(England)	RB/DM/CM	8 October 2001 (age 24)	46	6	2022	(England) Norwich City	Loan
21	Nigel Lonwijk	(Netherlands)	CB/RB	27 October 2002 (age 23)	41	0	2022	(England) Wolverhampton Wanderers	Loan
22	Brendan Galloway	(Zimbabwe)	LB/CB	17 March 1996 (age 30)	40	2	2021	(England) Luton Town	Free
24	Saxon Earley	(England)	LB/LM/DM	11 October 2002 (age 23)	9	2	2023	(England) Norwich City	Undisclosed
27	Ryan Law	(England)	LB	8 September 1999 (age 26)	29	2	2018	Academy	Trainee
36	Finley Craske	(England)	RB/LB	27 January 2003 (age 23)	9	0	2022	Academy	Trainee
37	Brandon Pursall	(England)	CB	16 March 2004 (age 22)	8	0	2021	Academy	Trainee
43	Oscar Halls	(England)	RB	19 January 2006 (age 20)	6	1	2022	Academy	Trainee
Midfielders
4	Jordan Houghton	(England)	DM/CM/CB	5 November 1995 (age 30)	100	1	2021	(England) Milton Keynes Dons	Free
7	Matt Butcher	(England)	DM/CM/CB	14 May 1997 (age 29)	48	3	2022	(England) Accrington Stanley	Free
8	Joe Edwards	(England)	RM/CM/RB	31 October 1990 (age 35)	186	20	2019	(England) Walsall	Free
10	Danny Mayor	(England)	LM/AM/CM	18 October 1990 (age 35)	163	7	2019	(England) Bury	Free
15	Conor Grant	(England)	CM/LM/RM	18 April 1995 (age 31)	137	14	2018	(England) Everton	Free
18	Finn Azaz	(England)	CM/AM	7 September 2000 (age 25)	38	8	2022	(England) Aston Villa	Loan
20	Adam Randell	(England)	DM/CB	1 October 2000 (age 25)	81	5	2018	Academy	Trainee
26	Callum Wright	(England)	CM/RM/RB	2 May 2000 (age 26)	23	4	2023	(England) Blackpool	£400,000
28	Jay Matete	(England)	CM/DM	11 February 2001 (age 25)	22	1	2023	(England) Sunderland	Loan
44	Will Jenkins-Davies	(Wales)	CM	22 October 2004 (age 21)	11	1	2021	Academy	Trainee
Forwards
9	Ryan Hardie	(Scotland)	CF	17 March 1997 (age 29)	163	49	2021	(England) Blackpool	Undisclosed
11	Niall Ennis	(England)	CF/LW	20 May 1999 (age 27)	97	24	2021	(England) Wolverhampton Wanderers	Undisclosed
14	Mickel Miller	(England)	LW/SS/RW	2 December 1995 (age 30)	12	0	2022	(England) Rotherham United	Free
16	Sam Cosgrove	(England)	CF	2 December 1996 (age 29)	30	12	2022	(England) Birmingham City	Loan
23	Ben Waine	(New Zealand)	CF/LW/RW	11 June 2001 (age 24)	11	2	2023	(New Zealand) Wellington Phoenix	Undisclosed
29	Tyreik Wright	(Republic of Ireland)	RW/LW/CF	22 September 2001 (age 24)	6	0	2023	(England) Aston Villa	Undisclosed
31	Luke Jephcott	(Wales)	CF	26 January 2000 (age 26)	117	37	2018	Academy	Trainee

=== Statistics ===
As of game played on 21 February 2023

No.	Pos	Nat	Player	Total		League One		FA Cup		EFL Cup		EFL Trophy	
No.	Pos	Nat	Player	Apps	Goals	Apps	Goals	Apps	Goals	Apps	Goals	Apps	Goals
1	GK	(England) ENG	Michael Cooper	31	0	29+0	0	1+0	0	1+0	0	0+0	0
2	DF	(England) ENG	James Bolton	8	1	2+4	1	0+0	0	0+0	0	2+0	0
3	DF	(England) ENG	Macauley Gillesphey	39	2	28+6	2	0+0	0	0+1	0	3+1	0
4	MF	(England) ENG	Jordan Houghton	47	0	29+14	0	0+0	0	1+0	0	3+0	0
5	DF	(Wales) WAL	James Wilson	45	1	36+4	1	0+1	0	1+0	0	3+0	0
6	DF	(England) ENG	Dan Scarr	35	2	30+2	2	1+0	0	0+0	0	2+0	0
7	MF	(England) ENG	Matt Butcher	47	3	31+9	3	1+0	0	1+0	0	3+2	0
8	MF	(England) ENG	Joe Edwards	47	3	36+4	3	1+0	0	1+0	0	4+1	0
9	FW	(Scotland) SCO	Ryan Hardie	52	17	25+18	13	1+0	0	0+1	0	3+4	4
10	MF	(England) ENG	Danny Mayor	33	1	22+7	1	0+0	0	0+1	0	3+0	0
11	FW	(England) ENG	Niall Ennis	44	14	19+18	12	0+1	0	1+0	0	2+3	2
14	FW	(England) ENG	Mickel Miller	11	0	4+4	0	0+0	0	0+0	0	2+1	0
15	MF	(England) ENG	Conor Grant	10	1	1+7	1	1+0	0	0+0	0	1+0	0
16	FW	(England) ENG	Sam Cosgrove*	40	9	14+20	8	1+0	0	0+0	0	3+2	1
17	DF	(England) ENG	Bali Mumba*	44	6	35+4	6	0+1	0	0+0	0	2+2	0
18	MF	(England) ENG	Finn Azaz*	38	7	24+9	7	0+0	0	0+1	0	1+3	0
20	MF	(England) ENG	Adam Randell	38	3	28+4	2	1+0	1	0+1	0	3+1	0
21	DF	(Netherlands) NED	Nigel Lonwijk*	39	0	27+7	0	1+0	0	1+0	0	2+1	0
22	DF	(Zimbabwe) ZIM	Brendan Galloway	25	0	14+5	0	1+0	0	1+0	0	3+1	0
23	FW	(New Zealand) NZL	Ben Waine	9	2	1+7	1	0+0	0	0+0	0	1+0	1
24	DF	(England) ENG	Saxon Earley	10	2	4+6	2	0+0	0	0+0	0	0+0	0
25	GK	(England) ENG	Callum Burton	24	0	16+1	0	0+0	0	0+0	0	7+0	0
26	MF	(England) ENG	Callum Wright	22	5	8+11	5	0+0	0	0+0	0	2+1	0
28	MF	(England) ENG	Jay Matete*	21	1	7+11	1	0+0	0	0+0	0	2+1	0
29	FW	(Republic of Ireland) IRL	Tyreik Wright	6	0	5+1	0	0+0	0	0+0	0	0+0	0
36	DF	(England) ENG	Finley Craske	4	0	0+2	0	0+0	0	0+0	0	2+0	0
42	DF	(England) ENG	Jack Endacott	7	0	0+1	0	0+0	0	1+0	0	4+1	0
43	DF	(England) ENG	Oscar Hall	5	1	0+0	0	0+0	0	0+0	0	4+1	1
44	MF	(Wales) WAL	Will Jenkins-Davies	7	1	0+2	0	1+0	0	0+0	0	4+0	1
48	FW	(Wales) WAL	Freddie Issaka	5	0	0+1	0	0+0	0	0+0	0	0+4	0
49	MF	(England) ENG	Caleb Roberts	4	1	0+1	0	0+1	0	0+0	0	2+0	1
Players out on loan:
31	FW	(Wales) WAL	Luke Jephcott	3	0	0+2	0	0+0	0	1+0	0	0+0	0
37	DF	(England) ENG	Brandon Pursall	2	0	0+0	0	0+0	0	0+0	0	2+0	0
Players who left the club during the season:
19	FW	(England) ENG	Morgan Whittaker*	30	9	19+6	9	0+1	0	1+0	0	1+2	0

=== Goals record ===
As of 21 February 2023

Rank	No.	Nat.	Po.	Name	League One	FA Cup	EFL Cup	EFL Trophy	Total
1	9	(Scotland)	CF	Ryan Hardie	13	0	0	4	17
2	11	(England)	CF	Niall Ennis	12	0	0	2	14
3	16	(England)	CF	Sam Cosgrove	8	0	0	1	9
3	19	(England)	RW	Morgan Whittaker	9	0	0	0	9
5	18	(England)	CM	Finn Azaz	7	0	0	0	7
6	17	(England)	LB	Bali Mumba	6	0	0	0	6
7	26	(England)	CM	Callum Wright	5	0	0	0	5
8	7	(England)	DM	Matt Butcher	3	0	0	0	3
8	8	(England)	CM	Joe Edwards	3	0	0	0	3
10	3	(England)	CB	Macauley Gillesphey	2	0	0	0	2
10	6	(England)	CB	Dan Scarr	2	0	0	0	2
10	20	(England)	CM	Adam Randell	2	1	0	0	3
10	23	(New Zealand)	CF	Ben Waine	1	0	0	1	2
10	24	(England)	LB	Saxon Earley	2	0	0	0	2
15	2	(England)	RB	James Bolton	1	0	0	0	1
15	5	(Wales)	CB	James Wilson	1	0	0	0	1
15	10	(England)	LM	Danny Mayor	1	0	0	0	1
15	15	(England)	LWB	Connor Grant	1	0	0	0	1
15	28	(England)	DM	Jay Matete	1	0	0	0	1
15	43	(England)	CB	Oscar Halls	0	0	0	1	1
15	44	(Wales)	CM	Will Jenkins-Davies	0	0	0	1	1
15	49	(England)	MF	Caleb Roberts	0	0	0	1	1
Own Goals				1	0	0	0	1	
Total					80	1	0	10	92

=== Disciplinary record ===
As of 21 February 2023

Rank	No.	Nat.	Po.	Name	League One			FA Cup			EFL Cup			EFL Trophy			Total		
Rank	No.	Nat.	Po.	Name	Booked	(yellow card) (yellow-red card)	Sent off (straight red)	Booked	(yellow card) (yellow-red card)	Sent off (straight red)	Booked	(yellow card) (yellow-red card)	Sent off (straight red)	Booked	(yellow card) (yellow-red card)	Sent off (straight red)	Booked	(yellow card) (yellow-red card)	Sent off (straight red)
1	16	(England)	CF	Sam Cosgrove	7	0	0	0	0	0	0	0	0	2	0	0	9	0	0
1	21	(Netherlands)	CB	Nigel Lonwijk	8	0	0	0	0	0	0	0	0	1	0	0	9	0	0
3	5	(Wales)	CB	James Wilson	6	0	1	0	0	0	1	0	0	0	0	0	7	0	1
3	28	(England)	CM	Jay Matete	8	0	0	0	0	0	0	0	0	0	0	0	8	0	0
6	8	(England)	RWB	Joe Edwards	5	1	0	0	0	0	0	0	0	0	0	0	5	1	0
6	6	(England)	CB	Dan Scarr	3	0	1	0	0	0	0	0	0	1	0	0	4	0	1
6	7	(England)	CM	Matt Butcher	3	0	0	1	0	0	0	0	0	1	0	0	5	0	0
6	11	(England)	CF	Niall Ennis	4	0	0	0	0	0	0	0	0	1	0	0	5	0	0
6	17	(England)	LWB	Bali Mumba	5	0	0	0	0	0	0	0	0	0	0	0	5	0	0
6	22	(Zimbabwe)	CB	Brendan Galloway	2	1	0	0	0	0	0	0	0	1	0	0	3	1	0
11	4	(England)	CM	Jordan Houghton	3	0	0	0	0	0	0	0	0	0	0	0	0	0	
11	14	(England)	LW	Mickel Miller	2	0	0	0	0	0	0	0	0	0	0	0	2	0	0
11	18	(England)	AM	Finn Azaz	2	0	0	0	0	0	1	0	0	0	0	0	3	0	0
11	19	(England)	RW	Morgan Whittaker	1	0	0	0	0	0	0	0	0	2	0	0	3	0	0
11	20	(England)	CM	Adam Randell	3	0	0	0	0	0	0	0	0	0	0	0	3	0	0
11	24	(England)	LB	Saxon Earley	2	0	0	0	0	0	0	0	0	0	0	0	2	0	0
17	1	(England)	GK	Michael Cooper	1	0	0	0	0	0	0	0	0	0	0	0	1	0	0
17	2	(England)	RB	James Bolton	0	0	0	0	0	0	0	0	0	1	0	0	1	0	0
17	3	(England)	CB	Macauley Gillesphey	1	0	0	0	0	0	0	0	0	0	0	0	1	0	0
17	10	(England)	LM	Danny Mayor	0	0	0	0	0	0	0	0	0	1	0	0	1	0	0
17	25	(England)	GK	Callum Burton	1	0	0	0	0	0	0	0	0	0	0	0	1	0	0
17	26	(England)	CM	Callum Wright	1	0	0	0	0	0	0	0	0	0	0	0	1	0	0
Total					72	2	2	1	0	0	2	0	0	10	0	0	86	2	2

== Transfers ==
=== In ===
Date	Pos	Player	Transferred from	Fee	Ref
1 July 2022 (Note: The transfer was announced on 20 June, and would become official on 1 July, once his Accrington Stanley contract expired)	DM	(England) Matt Butcher	(England) Accrington Stanley	Free Transfer	
1 July 2022 (Note: The transfer was announced on 30 June, and would become official on 1 July, once his Bristol City contract expired)	GK	(England) Matt Martin	(England) Bristol City	Free Transfer	
1 July 2022 (Note: The transfer was announced on 27 June, and would become official on 1 July, once his Rotherham United contract expired)	LW	(England) Mickel Miller	(England) Rotherham United	Free Transfer	
6 October 2022	GK	(England) Adam Parkes	(England) Watford	Free Transfer	
1 January 2023 (Note: The transfer was announced on 30 December, and would become official on 1 January, once the transfer window re-opens)	CF	(New Zealand) Ben Waine	(New Zealand) Wellington Phoenix	Undisclosed	
2 January 2023	LB	(England) Saxon Earley	(England) Norwich City	Undisclosed	
4 January 2023	CM	(England) Callum Wright	(England) Blackpool	Undisclosed	
9 January 2023	RW	(England) Tyreik Wright	(England) Aston Villa	Undisclosed	

=== Out ===
Date	Pos	Player	Transferred to	Fee	Ref
27 June 2022	LW	(England) George Cooper	(England) Chesterfield	Mutual Consent	
30 June 2022	DM	(England) Carlo Garside	(England) Plymouth Parkway	Released	
30 June 2022	LW	(England) Oscar Massey	(England) Swindon Town	Released	
30 June 2022	GK	(England) Luke McCormick	Retired	—N/a	
30 June 2022	DM	(United States) Ethan Mitchell	(England) Wigan Athletic	Released	
30 June 2022	GK	(England) Lewis Moyle	(England) Mousehole	Released	
30 June 2022	RB	(England) Oscar Rutherford	(England) Eastleigh	Released	
30 June 2022	CF	(England) Jamal Salawu	(England) Yate Town	Released	
30 June 2022	CF	(England) Rhys Shirley	Unattached	Released	
30 June 2022	CB	(England) Oliver Tomlinson	(England) Torquay United	Released	
30 June 2022	FW	(England) Angel Waruih	(England) Brentford	Released	
30 June 2022	DF	(England) Alfie Wotton	(England) Saltash United	Released	
27 July 2022	CM	(England) Alfie Lewis	(Republic of Ireland) Dundalk	Undisclosed	
1 September 2022	AM	(Guinea-Bissau) Panutche Camara	(England) Ipswich Town	Undisclosed	

=== Loans in ===
Date	Pos	Player	Loaned from	On loan until	Ref
11 July 2022	CM	(England) Finn Azaz	(England) Aston Villa	End of Season	
14 July 2022	RB	(England) Bali Mumba	(England) Norwich City	End of Season	
20 July 2022	RW	(England) Morgan Whittaker	(Wales) Swansea City	3 January 2023 (Note: On 3 January, Whittaker was recalled back to Swansea)	
29 July 2022	CB	(Netherlands) Nigel Lonwijk	(England) Wolverhampton Wanderers	End of Season	
1 September 2022	CF	(England) Sam Cosgrove	(England) Birmingham City	End of Season	
6 January 2023	CM	(England) Jay Matete	(England) Sunderland	End of Season	

=== Loans out ===
Date	Pos	Player	Loaned to	On loan until	Ref
18 July 2022	LB	(England) Ryan Law	(England) Gillingham	9 January 2023 (Note: On 9 January, Law was recalled back from his loan at Gillingham)	
25 July 2022	CB	(England) Brandon Pursall	(England) Plymouth Parkway	31 August 2022	
1 August 2022	MF	(England) Finley Craske	(England) Yeovil Town	14 October 2022	
1 September 2022	CF	(Wales) Luke Jephcott	(England) Swindon Town	End of Season	
14 October 2022	GK	(England) Adam Parkes	(England) Plymouth Parkway	9 February 2023 (Note: On 25 January, Parkes' loan at Plymouth Parkway was extended until the end of season, but on 9 February he was recalled)	
31 December 2022	CB	(England) Brandon Pursall	(England) Tavistock	End of Season	
10 January 2023	RB	(England) Finley Craske	(England) Truro City	End of Season	
10 February 2023	LB	(England) Ryan Law	(England) Yeovil Town	End of Season	

== Pre-season and friendlies ==
Truro City announced a friendly match with Plymouth on 17 May 2022. Plymouth confirmed that match on 24 May, whilst also announcing matches with Plymouth Parkway, Bristol City and Yeovil Town. A day later, an away trip to Torquay United was added to the pre-season schedule. A sixth fixture was added to the calendar, against Swansea City.

Win Draw Loss Fixtures

2 July 2022 Friendly	Plymouth Parkway	2–2	Plymouth Argyle	Plymouth
15:00 BST	Palfrey 12'; Seymour 45+1'	Report	Hardie 82'; Edwards 90+2'	Stadium: Bolitho Park; Attendance: 2,349

6 July 2022 Friendly	Europa Point	1–15	Plymouth Argyle	Estepona, Spain
		Report

12 July 2022 Friendly	Plymouth Argyle	1–1	Swansea City	Plymouth
19:30 BST	Hardie 89'	Report	Piroe 6'	Stadium: Home Park; Attendance: 3,912

16 July 2022 Friendly	Plymouth Argyle	0–1	Bristol City	Plymouth
15:00 BST		Report	Wells 82'	Stadium: Home Park; Attendance: 5,718; Referee: Lee Swabey

19 July 2022 Friendly	Torquay United	0–5	Plymouth Argyle	Torquay
19:45 BST		Report	Azaz 7'; Mayor 20', 57'; Randell 45'; Endacott 55'	Stadium: Plainmoor; Attendance: 2,511; Referee: Sav Yianni

23 July 2022 Friendly	Yeovil Town	0–2	Plymouth Argyle	Yeovil
15:00 BST		Report	Hardie 48'; Azaz 60'	Stadium: Huish Park; Attendance: 1,565

26 July 2022 Friendly	Truro City	Cancelled	Plymouth Argyle	Plymouth
19:45 BST				Stadium: Bolitho Park
Note: Match was cancelled due to a number of unforeseen factors.

== Competitions ==
=== Overall record ===
Competition	First match	Last match	Starting round	Final position	Record							
Competition	First match	Last match	Starting round	Final position	Pld	W	D	L	GF	GA	GD	Win %
League One	30 July 2022	May 2023	Matchday 1	1st	46	31	8	7	82	47	+35	67.39
FA Cup	5 November 2022		First round	First round	1	0	0	1	1	5	−4	0.00
EFL Cup	10 August 2022		First round	First round	1	0	0	1	0	2	−2	0.00
EFL Trophy	30 August 2022	2 April 2023	Group stage	Runners-up	8	4	3	1	14	12	+2	50.00
Total					56	35	11	10	97	66	+31	62.50

Last updated: 7 May 2023
Source: FBREF

=== League One ===
==== League table ====
Pos	Team	Pld	W	D	L	GF	GA	GD	Pts	Promotion, qualification or relegation
1	Plymouth Argyle (C, P)	46	31	8	7	82	47	+35	101	Promotion to EFL Championship
2	Ipswich Town (P)	46	28	14	4	101	35	+66	98	Promotion to EFL Championship
3	Sheffield Wednesday (O, P)	46	28	12	6	81	37	+44	96	Qualification for League One play-offs
4	Barnsley	46	26	8	12	80	47	+33	86	Qualification for League One play-offs
5	Bolton Wanderers	46	23	12	11	62	36	+26	81	Qualification for League One play-offs
6	Peterborough United	46	24	5	17	75	54	+21	77	Qualification for League One play-offs

Source: EFL Official Website
Rules for classification: 1) Points; 2) Goal difference; 3) Number of goals scored; 4) Head-to-head results; 5) Wins; 6) Away goals; 7) Penalty points (sec 9.5); 8) 12-point sending off offences
(C) Champions; (O) Play-off winners; (P) Promoted

==== Results summary ====
Overall								Home						Away					
Pld	W	D	L	GF	GA	GD	Pts	W	D	L	GF	GA	GD	W	D	L	GF	GA	GD
46	31	8	7	82	47	+35	101	20	1	2	44	16	+28	11	7	5	38	31	+7

Last updated: 29 April 2023.
Source: FBREF

==== Results by round ====
Round	1	2	3	4	5	6	7	8	9	10	11	12	13	14	15	16	17	18	19	20	21	22	23	24	25	26	27	28	29	30	31	32	33	34	35	36	37	38	39	40	41	42	43	44	45	46
Ground	H	A	H	A	A	H	A	H	A	H	A	H	H	A	A	H	H	A	H	H	A	H	A	H	H	A	A	H	A	H	A	H	A	H	H	A	H	A	A	H	H	A	H	H	H	A
Result	W	L	W	L	W	W	W	W	D	W	W	W	W	W	D	W	W	D	D	L	D	W	W	W	W	D	D	W	L	W	W	D	L	W	W	L	W	W	W	L	W	W	W	W	W	W
Position	7	12	5	12	5	5	3	3	3	1	1	1	1	1	1	1	1	1	1	1	2	1	1	1	1	1	1	1	2	1	1	2	2	2	2	2	2	1	1	2	1	1	1	1	1	1

Updated to match(es) played on 29 April 2023. Source: [ Soccerway]
A = Away; H = Home; W = Win; D = Draw; L = Loss; P = Postponed

==== Matches ====
On 23 June, the league fixtures were announced.

Win Draw Loss Fixtures

30 July 2022 1	Plymouth Argyle	1–0	Barnsley	Plymouth
15:00 BST	Azaz 45'	Report	Cadden (yellow card) 10'; Styles (yellow card) 44'	Stadium: Home Park; Attendance: 14,624; Referee: Charles Breakspear

6 August 2022 2	Fleetwood Town	2–1	Plymouth Argyle	Fleetwood
15:00 BST	Batty 28'; Garner 88'; Earl (yellow card) 90+7'	Report	Hardie 23' (pen.); Gillesphey (yellow card) 51'; Butcher (yellow card) 53'; Mumba (yellow card) 56'; Scarr (yellow card) 62'	Stadium: Highbury Stadium; Attendance: 3,713; Referee: Robert Lewis

13 August 2022 3	Plymouth Argyle	2–0	Peterborough United	Plymouth
15:00 BST	Azaz 30', (yellow card) 84'; Hardie 65' (pen.); Wilson (yellow card) 82'	Report	Thompson (yellow card) 48'; Knight (yellow card) 78'	Stadium: Home Park; Attendance: 13,307; Referee: Tom Reeves

16 August 2022 4	Charlton Athletic	5–1	Plymouth Argyle	Charlton
19:45 BST	Rak-Sakyi 11'; Stockley 41' (pen.); Clare 45+3'; Kirk 76'; Leaburn 84'	Report	Wilson (red card) 39'; Whittaker 71'	Stadium: The Valley; Attendance: 12,392; Referee: Sam Purkiss

20 August 2022 5	Forest Green Rovers	0–3	Plymouth Argyle	Nailsworth
15:00 BST	Hendry (yellow card) 74'	Report	Azaz 18'; Mumba 27', (yellow card) 84'; Ennis 61'	Stadium: The innocent New Lawn Stadium; Attendance: 3,404; Referee: Darren Drysdale

27 August 2022 6	Plymouth Argyle	2–0	Bolton Wanderers	Plymouth
15:00 BST	Ennis 34', (yellow card) 40'; Edwards (yellow card) 53'; Hardie 88'	Report	Bradley (yellow card) 65'	Stadium: Home Park; Attendance: 14,631; Referee: Will Finnie

3 September 2022 7	Derby County	2–3	Plymouth Argyle	Derby
15:00 BST	Collins 26'; Mendez-Laing 38'; McGoldrick (yellow card) 57'	Report	Mumba (yellow card) 34'; Whittaker 56'; Cosgrove 77', 90'	Stadium: Pride Park Stadium; Attendance: 27,173; Referee: Ollie Yates

13 September 2022 8	Plymouth Argyle	1–0	Oxford United	Plymouth
19:45 BST	Randell (yellow card) 42'; Whittaker 70'	Report	Findlay (yellow card) 66'; Brown (yellow card) 80'	Stadium: Home Park; Attendance: 12,563; Referee: Craig Hicks

17 September 2022 9	Portsmouth	2–2	Plymouth Argyle	Milton
15:00 BST	Koroma 41'; Pack (yellow card) 43'; Hackett-Fairchild (yellow card) 90+3', (goal) 90+4'; Bishop (yellow card) 90+3'; Morrison (yellow card) 90+4'	Report	Raggett 74' (o.g.); Ennis 79'; Galloway (yellow card) 89' (yellow-red card) 90+3'; Azaz (yellow card) 90+2'	Stadium: Fratton Park; Attendance: 19,009; Referee: James Bell

25 September 2022 10	Plymouth Argyle	2–1	Ipswich Town	Plymouth
12:30 BST	Mumba 69'; Whittaker 75'	Report	Harness (yellow card) 20'; Morsy (yellow card) 22'; Ladapo 39'; Edmundson (yellow card) 66'; Evans (yellow card) 71'	Stadium: Home Park; Attendance: 15,480; Referee: Scott Oldham

1 October 2022 11	Wycombe Wanderers	0–1	Plymouth Argyle	High Wycombe
15:00 BST		Report	Cosgrove 8' (pen.); Scarr (yellow card) 44'	Stadium: Adams Park; Attendance: 5,869; Referee: John Busby

4 October 2022 12	Plymouth Argyle	2–1	Sheffield Wednesday	Plymouth
19:45 BST	Hardie 3'; Edwards (yellow card) 41'; Lonwijk (yellow card) 50'; Cosgrove 90+1'	Report	Palmer 7'; Windass (yellow card) 73'	Stadium: Home Park; Attendance: 16,381; Referee: Andy Davies

8 October 2022 13	Plymouth Argyle	3–0	Accrington Stanley	Plymouth
15:00 BST	Ennis 24' (yellow card) 67'; Mumba (yellow card) 33'; Scarr (red card) 38'; Cosgrove (yellow card) 39' (goal) 63'; Galloway (yellow card) 90+2'; Hardie 90+3'	Report	Hamilton (yellow card) 1'; Conneely (red card) 38'; Coyle (yellow card) 39'; Whalley (yellow card) 56'	Stadium: Home Park; Attendance: 15,065; Referee: Neil Hair

15 October 2022 14	Milton Keynes Dons	1–4	Plymouth Argyle	Denbigh
15:00 BST	Grigg 49'; Robson (yellow card) 70'; Cumming (yellow card) 85'	Report	Whittaker 9'; Ennis 25'; Azaz 37' 59'	Stadium: Stadium:mk; Attendance: 10,656; Referee: Sam Allison

22 October 2022 15	Bristol Rovers	2–2	Plymouth Argyle	Horfield
15:00 BST	Loft (yellow card) 37'; Coburn 47'; Collins 57'	Report	Azaz 14'; Houghton (yellow card) 23'; Randell (yellow card) 31' (goal) 45+2'; Galloway (yellow card) 69'; Lonwijk (yellow card) 90+1'	Stadium: Memorial Stadium; Attendance: 9,258; Referee: Christopher Pollard

25 October 2022 16	Plymouth Argyle	2–1	Shrewsbury Town	Plymouth
19:45 BST	Cosgrove (yellow card) 68'; Ennis 70'; Whittaker 83'	Report	Shipley 30'; Leahy (yellow card) 87'	Stadium: Home Park; Attendance: 15,322; Referee: Andy Woolmer

31 October 2022 17	Plymouth Argyle	4–2	Exeter City	Plymouth
20:00 GMT	Whittaker 27'; Mumba 58'; Hardie 70', 84'	Report	Collins 25'; Nombe 52'	Stadium: Home Park; Attendance: 16,567; Referee: Charles Breakspear

12 November 2022 18	Lincoln City	1–1	Plymouth Argyle	Lincoln
15:00 GMT	Sanders 45+1'	Report	Randell 31' (yellow card) 90+2'; Houghton (yellow card) 71'; Lonwijk (yellow card) 81'	Stadium: LNER Stadium; Attendance: 9,014; Referee: Craig Hicks

19 November 2022 19	Burton Albion	2–2	Plymouth Argyle	Burton upon Trent
15:00 GMT	Oshilaja (yellow card) 17'; Kamwa 41'; Onyango (yellow card) 62'; Hamer (yellow card) 63'; Winnall (yellow card) 85'; Mariappa 90+7'	Report	Lonwijk (yellow card) 25'; Hardie 64' (pen.); Mumba 73'	Stadium: Pirelli Stadium; Attendance: 3,986; Referee: Martin Woods

2 December 2022 20	Plymouth Argyle	0–2	Port Vale	Plymouth
19:45 GMT	Lonwijk (yellow card) 61'	Report	Stevens (yellow card) 56'; Wilson 65', 71'; Politic (yellow card) 90+5'	Stadium: Home Park; Attendance: 15,633; Referee: John Busby

10 December 2022 21	Cambridge United	0–0	Plymouth Argyle	Cambridge
15:00 GMT		Report	Butcher (yellow card) 2'; Miller (yellow card) 16'; Cosgrove (yellow card) 31'; Whittaker (yellow card) 52'; Houghton (yellow card) 62'	Stadium: Abbey Stadium; Attendance: 5,546; Referee: Sunny Gill

17 December 2022 22	Plymouth Argyle	2–1	Morecambe	Plymouth
15:00 GMT	Whittaker (penalty missed) 43'; Ennis 69'; Cosgrove 84'	Report	Shaw (yellow card) 30'; O'Connor 90+1'	Stadium: Home Park; Attendance: 14,368; Referee: Tom Reeves

26 December 2022 23	Cheltenham Town	0–1	Plymouth Argyle	Cheltenham
15:00 GMT	Long (yellow card) 38'	Report	Lonwijk (yellow card) 41'; Whittaker 78'	Stadium: Completely-Suzuki Stadium; Attendance: 5,975; Referee: Tom Nield

29 December 2022 24	Plymouth Argyle	1–0	Wycombe Wanderers	Plymouth
19:45 GMT	Lonwijk (yellow card) 24'; Scarr 33'	Report	Forino-Joseph (yellow card) 29'; Thompson (yellow card) 79'	Stadium: Home Park; Attendance: 15,729; Referee: Carl Brook

1 January 2023 25	Plymouth Argyle	3–1	Milton Keynes Dons	Plymouth
15:00 GMT	Wilson 4'; Ennis 37'; Whittaker 53'	Report	Holland 19'; Tucker (yellow card) 49'	Stadium: Home Park; Attendance: 15,421; Referee: Paul Howard

7 January 2023 26	Bolton Wanderers	0–0	Plymouth Argyle	Horwich
15:00 GMT	Böðvarsson (yellow card) 70'	Report	Edwards (yellow card) 70' (yellow-red card) 90+7'; Wilson (yellow card) 70'; Cooper (yellow card) 90+5'	Stadium: University of Bolton Stadium; Attendance: 18,638; Referee: Declan Bourne

14 January 2023 27	Ipswich Town	1–1	Plymouth Argyle	Ipswich
15:00 GMT	Burns (yellow card) 11', (goal) 63'; Hirst (yellow card) 87'	Report	Wilson (yellow card) 38'; Mumba 90+3'	Stadium: Portman Road; Attendance: 29,069; Referee: Andy Woolmer

21 January 2023 28	Plymouth Argyle	4–2	Cheltenham Town	Plymouth
15:00 GMT	Scarr 26'; Hardie 28'; Wright 64'; Cosgrove 83'	Report	Perry 40'; May 70'; Bonds (yellow card) 79'	Stadium: Home Park; Attendance: 16,097; Referee: Steve Martin

4 February 2023 29	Sheffield Wednesday	1–0	Plymouth Argyle	Owlerton
15:00 GMT	Paterson 7', (yellow card) 54'; Byers (yellow card) 45+2'; Bannan (yellow card) 60'	Report	Edwards (yellow card) 30'	Stadium: Hillsborough Stadium; Attendance: 33,442; Referee: John Busby

11 February 2023 30	Plymouth Argyle	3–1	Portsmouth	Plymouth
15:00 GMT	Cosgrove 24'; Azaz 70'; Matete (yellow card) 73'; Butcher (yellow card) 76'; Hardie 90+4'	Report	Hackett-Fairchild 79'; Raggett (yellow card) 85'; Bishop (yellow card) 87'	Stadium: Home Park; Attendance: 16,734; Referee: Simon Mather

14 February 2023 31	Oxford United	1–3	Plymouth Argyle	Littlemore
19:45 GMT	Brannagan 44', (yellow card) 56'; McGuane (yellow card) 62'; Fleming (yellow card) 64'	Report	Matete (yellow card) 9'; Butcher 19'; Lonwijk (yellow card) 43'; Earley 65', (yellow card) 81'; Cosgrove (yellow card) 70'; Burton (yellow card) 90+2'; Hardie 90+3'	Stadium: The Kassam Stadium; Attendance: 8,242 (1,490 Argyle fans); Referee: Alan Young

18 February 2023 32	Plymouth Argyle	0–0	Fleetwood Town	Plymouth
15:00 GMT	Miller (yellow card) 85'	Report	Mendes Gomes (yellow card) 64'; Nsiala (yellow card) 74'; Rooney (yellow card) 78'; Macadam (yellow card) 80'; Warrington (yellow card) 82'; Ndaba (yellow card) 90+5'	Stadium: Home Park; Attendance: 16,108 (107 away); Referee: David Rock

25 February 2023 33	Peterborough United	5–2	Plymouth Argyle	Peterborough
15:00 GMT	Clarke-Harris 16' (pen.), 64'; Kyprianou 19', (yellow card) 21'; Burrows 54'; Taylor 78'	Report	Earley 36'; Cosgrove (yellow card) 41'; Wilson (yellow card) 45+3'; Gillesphey 58'	Stadium: Weston Homes Stadium; Attendance: 8,365 (1,511 away); Referee: Scott Oldham

5 March 2023 34	Plymouth Argyle	2–0	Charlton Athletic	Plymouth
15:00 GMT	Hardie 46'; Ennis 87'	Report		Stadium: Home Park; Attendance: 16,011 (655 away); Referee: Andy Woolmer

7 March 2023 35	Plymouth Argyle	2–1	Derby County	Plymouth
19:45 GMT	Wilson (yellow card) 19'; Wright 59'; Hardie 70' (pen.); Matete (yellow card) 89'	Report	Mendez-Laing 17'; Knight (yellow card) 90+4'	Stadium: Home Park; Attendance: 16,461; Referee: Charles Breakspear

11 March 2023 36	Barnsley	3–0	Plymouth Argyle	Barnsley
15:00 GMT	Connell (yellow card) 52'; Phillips 60'; Andersen 77'; Cadden 90+1'	Report	Matete (yellow card) 43'; Wright (yellow card) 90+4'	Stadium: Oakwell Stadium; Attendance: 12,443; Referee: Will Finnie

18 March 2023 37	Plymouth Argyle	2–0	Forest Green Rovers	Plymouth
15:00 GMT	Bolton 8'; Mumba 47'	Report	O'Keeffe (yellow card) 60'	Stadium: Home Park; Attendance: 16,307 (269 away); Referee: Benjamin Speedie

21 March 2023 38	Accrington Stanley	0–2	Plymouth Argyle	Accrington
19:45 GMT	Sangare (yellow card) 17' (yellow-red card) 51'; McConville (yellow card) 38'; Martin (yellow card) 42'; Longelo (yellow card) 90+4'	Report	Butcher 14'; Grant 78'	Stadium: Wham Stadium; Attendance: 2,489 (689 away); Referee: Marc Edwards

7 April 2023 39	Morecambe	1–3	Plymouth Argyle	Morecambe
15:00 BST	Weir 3'; Rawson (yellow card) 30'; Austerfield (yellow card) 74'	Report	Edwards (yellow card) 59'; Mayor 63'; Waine 86'; Matete 90+3', (yellow card) 90+4'	Stadium: The Mazuma Stadium; Attendance: 4,904 (1,050 away); Referee: Marc Edwards

10 April 2023 40	Plymouth Argyle	0–2	Lincoln City	Plymouth
15:00 BST	Wilson (yellow card) 30'	Report	Shodipo 28'; O'Connor (yellow card) 43'; House 47'; Virtue (yellow card) 56'; Erhahon (yellow card) 58'	Stadium: Home Park; Attendance: 16,298 (381 away); Referee: Tom Nield

15 April 2023 41	Exeter City	0–1	Plymouth Argyle	Exeter
12:00 BST	Chauke (yellow card) 3'; Stansfield (yellow card) 76'	Report	Earley (yellow card) 24'; Scarr (yellow card) 54'; Butcher 70'; Edwards (yellow card) 88'	Stadium: St James' Park; Attendance: 8,046 (1,246 away); Referee: Darren Drysdale

18 April 2023 42	Shrewsbury Town	1–2	Plymouth Argyle	Shrewsbury
19:45 BST	Shipley (yellow card) 46'; Phillips 53'	Report	Cosgrove (yellow card) 17'; Edwards 68'; Matete (yellow card) 80'; Wright 90+6'; Ennis (yellow card) 90+7'	Stadium: New Meadow; Attendance: 5,801; Referee: Anthony Backhouse

22 April 2023 43	Plymouth Argyle	3–1	Cambridge United	Plymouth
15:00 BST	Wright 15'; Mumba (yellow card) 45+3'; Edwards 56'; Ennis 73'	Report	Smith 31'; Brophy (yellow card) 39'; Bennett (yellow card) 39'; Morrison (yellow card) 90+5'	Stadium: Home Park; Attendance: 16,326 (292 away); Referee: Ollie Yates

25 April 2023 44	Plymouth Argyle	2–0	Bristol Rovers	Plymouth
19:45 BST	Ennis 51'; Gillesphey 56'; Matete (yellow card) 81'	Report	Evans (yellow card) 13' (yellow-red card) 26'; Loft (yellow card) 86' Joey Barton (yellow card) off the pitch'	Stadium: Home Park; Attendance: 16,254 (409 away); Referee: Craig Hicks

29 April 2023 45	Plymouth Argyle	1–0	Burton Albion	Plymouth
15:00 BST	Ennis 45'	Report	Ashworth (yellow card) 66'; Powell (yellow card) 89'; Carayol (yellow card) 90+3'	Stadium: Home Park; Attendance: 16,634 (283 away); Referee: Lewis Smith

7 May 2023 46	Port Vale	1–3	Plymouth Argyle	Stoke-on-Trent
12:00 BST	Plant 45'	Report	Randell 34'; Edwards 38'; Azaz 61'; Azaz (yellow card) 81'	Stadium: Vale Park; Attendance: 11,998 (3,926 away); Referee: Simon Mather

=== FA Cup ===
Plymouth were drawn away to Grimsby Town in the first round.

Win Draw Loss Fixtures

5 November 2022 First round	Grimsby Town	5–1	Plymouth Argyle	Cleethorpes
15:00 GMT	Smith 10' (yellow card) 87'; Efete 33'; Kiernan 39', 58'; Glennon 45+7'; Khan (yellow card) 49'	Report	Randell 5'; Butcher (yellow card) 70'	Stadium: Blundell Park; Attendance: 4,571; Referee: Thomas Parsons

=== EFL Cup ===
Win Draw Loss Fixtures

Argyle were drawn at home to Peterborough United in the first round.

10 August 2022 First round	Plymouth Argyle	0–2	Peterborough United	Plymouth
19:45 BST	Wilson (yellow card) 49'; Azaz (yellow card) 67'	Report	Jones 28'; Knight (yellow card) 89'; J.Taylor 90+3'	Stadium: Home Park; Attendance: 6,098; Referee: Alan Young

=== EFL Trophy ===
On 20 June, the initial Group stage draw was made, grouping Plymouth Argye with Bristol Rovers and Swindon Town. Three days later, Crystal Palace U21s joined Southern Group E. Argyle were then drawn at home to Charlton Athletic in the second round and against AFC Wimbledon in the third round. In the semi-finals, Argyle were drawn at home versus Cheltenham Town.

Pos	Div	Team	Pld	W	PW	PL	L	GF	GA	GD	Pts	Qualification
1	L1	Plymouth Argyle	3	2	1	0	0	5	2	+3	8	Advance to Round 2
2	L1	Bristol Rovers	3	2	0	1	0	6	1	+5	7	Advance to Round 2
3	ACA	Crystal Palace U21	3	1	0	0	2	2	3	−1	3	
4	L2	Swindon Town	3	0	0	0	3	1	8	−7	0	

Source: EFL.com

Win Draw Loss Fixtures

30 August 2022 Group stage	Plymouth Argyle	1–1 (4–3 p)	Bristol Rovers	Plymouth
19:00 BST	Whittaker (yellow card) 37'; Hardie 58' (pen.)	Report	Loft 50'; Saunders (yellow card) 60'; Rossiter (yellow card) 89'	Stadium: Home Park; Attendance: 2,298; Referee: Carl Brook
	Penalties
	Azaz (penalty scored); Randell (penalty missed); Gillesphey (penalty scored); Houghton (penalty scored); Ennis (penalty scored)		Collins (penalty scored); Evans (penalty missed); Greenslade (penalty missed); McCormick (penalty scored); Jones (penalty scored)

20 September 2022 Group stage	Swindon Town	1–3	Plymouth Argyle	Swindon
19:00 BST	Iandolo (yellow card) 24'; Khan (yellow card) 41'; Hepburn-Murphy 90+1'	Report	Jenkins-Davies 28'; Halls 30'; Cosgrove (yellow card) 45+2'; Whittaker (yellow card) 66'; Hardie 88'; Butcher (yellow card) 90'	Stadium: The County Ground; Attendance: 2,026; Referee: David Rock

18 October 2022 Group stage	Plymouth Argyle	1–0	Crystal Palace U21	Plymouth
19:00 BST	Ennis 90+1'	Report		Stadium: Home Park; Attendance: 1,918; Referee: Ben Speedie

22 November 2022 Second round	Plymouth Argyle	3–2	Charlton Athletic	Plymouth
19:00 GMT	Cosgrove 13'; Ennis 15'; Roberts 46'	Report	Kanu 8'; Henry (yellow card) 11'; Anderson 90+2'	Stadium: Home Park; Attendance: 1,394; Referee: Robert Lewis

13 December 2022 Third round	Plymouth Argyle	Postponed	AFC Wimbledon	Plymouth
19:00 GMT				Stadium: Home Park
Note: Fixture was postponed due to a frozen pitch.

21 December 2022 Third round	Plymouth Argyle	3–3 (4–3 p)	AFC Wimbledon	Plymouth
19:00 GMT	Cosgrove 61', 72', 76', (yellow card) 86'; Halls (yellow card) 78'; Lonwijk (yellow card) 90+3'	Report	Hudlin 10', 17'; Assal 45+1'; Woodyard (yellow card) 87'	Stadium: Home Park; Attendance: 1,747; Referee: Sam Barrott
	Penalties
	Hardie (penalty scored); Cosgrove (penalty scored); Houghton (penalty scored); Whittaker (penalty scored); Mumba (penalty scored)		Hudlin (penalty scored); Towler (penalty scored); Assal (penalty missed); Fisher (penalty missed); Chislett (penalty scored)

10 January 2023 Quarter-final	Bristol Rovers	0–2	Plymouth Argyle	Horfield
19:45 GMT	Loft (yellow card) 85'; Thomas (yellow card) 90+5'	Report	Waine 24'; Hardie 32'; Lonwijk (yellow card) 77'; Ennis (yellow card) 88'	Stadium: Memorial Stadium; Attendance: 3,742; Referee: Darren Drysdale

22 February 2023 Semi-final	Plymouth Argyle	1–1 (3–2 p)	Cheltenham Town	Plymouth
20:00 GMT	Galloway (yellow card) 24'; Hardie 63'; Bolton (yellow card) 90+2'	Report	May 49', (yellow card) 53'; Keena (yellow card) 64'; Jackson (yellow card) 75'; Long (yellow card) 80'	Stadium: Home Park; Attendance: 12,047 (236 away); Referee: Robert Lewis
	Penalties
	Hardie (penalty scored); Cosgrove (penalty scored); Azaz (penalty missed); Gillesphey (penalty scored); Houghton (penalty missed)		Sercombe (penalty scored); Brown (penalty scored); Broom (penalty missed); Bonds (penalty missed); May (penalty missed)

2 April 2023 Final	Bolton Wanderers	4–0	Plymouth Argyle	London
15:00 BST	Dempsey 4'; Charles 10'; Kachunga 49'; Jones 62'	Report	Mayor (yellow card) 40'; Scarr (yellow card) 51'; Cosgrove (yellow card) 84'	Stadium: Wembley Stadium; Attendance: 79,389; Referee: Ben Toner
