= 2022–23 Bristol Rovers F.C. season =

Bristol Rovers
2022–23 season
- Owner: Wael al-Qadi
- CEO: Tom Gorringe
- Manager: Joey Barton
- Stadium: Memorial Stadium
- League One: 17th
- FA Cup: Second round
- EFL Cup: First round
- EFL Trophy: Fourth round
- Top goalscorer: League: Aaron Collins (16); All: Aaron Collins (16)
- Highest home attendance: 10,086 vs. Bolton Wanderers (7 May 2023)
- Lowest home attendance: 864 vs. Milton Keynes Dons (13 December 2022, EFL Trophy third round)
- Average home league attendance: 8,907

The 2022–23 season is the 140th season in the existence of Bristol Rovers Football Club and the club's first season back in League One since the 2020–21 season following their promotion in the previous season. In addition to the league, they will also compete in the 2022–23 FA Cup, the 2022–23 EFL Cup and the 2022–23 EFL Trophy.

== Transfers ==
=== In ===
| Date | Pos | Player | Transferred from | Fee | Ref |
|---|---|---|---|---|---|
| 21 June 2022 | CM | (England) Jordan Rossiter | (England) Fleetwood Town | Undisclosed | |
| 24 June 2022 | CB | (Wales) James Connolly | (Wales) Cardiff City | Undisclosed | |
| 1 July 2022 (Note: The transfer was announced on 22 June, and would become official on July 1, once his Port Vale contract expired) | RB | (England) James Gibbons | (England) Port Vale | Free transfer | |
| 4 July 2022 | CF | (England) John Marquis | (England) Lincoln City | Free transfer | |
| 6 August 2022 | LB | (Scotland) Lewis Gordon | (England) Brentford | Free transfer | |
| 24 August 2022 | CM | (England) Luke McCormick | (England) AFC Wimbledon | Undisclosed | |
| 18 October 2022 | LW | (England) Scott Sinclair | (England) Preston North End | Free transfer | |
| 27 January 2023 | CM | (England) Grant Ward | (England) Blackpool | Free transfer | |
| 31 January 2023 | LB | (Scotland) Calum Macdonald | (England) Stockport County | Free transfer | |

=== Out ===
| Date | Pos | Player | Transferred to | Fee | Ref |
|---|---|---|---|---|---|
| 30 June 2022 | LB | (England) Junior Brown | (England) Whitchurch Alport | Released | |
| 30 June 2022 | CF | (England) Leon Clarke | (England) Hartlepool United | Released | |
| 30 June 2022 | CM | (England) Cameron Hargreaves | (England) King's Lynn Town | Released | |
| 30 June 2022 | CB | (Wales) Cian Harries | (England) Swindon Town | Released | |
| 30 June 2022 | CF | (England) Ollie Hulbert | (England) Yeovil Town | Released | |
| 30 June 2022 | CM | (England) Ben Liddle | (England) Darlington | Released | |
| 30 June 2022 | CM | (Wales) Pablo Martinez | (England) Chippenham Town | Released | |
| 30 June 2022 | CM | (England) Tom Mehew | (England) Chippenham Town | Released | |
| 30 June 2022 (Note: The transfer was announced on 17 June, and would become official once his contract at the club expired) | LW | (Scotland) Sam Nicholson | (United States) Colorado Rapids | Free transfer | |
| 30 June 2022 | CM | (England) Jon Nolan | (England) Tranmere Rovers | Released | |
| 30 June 2022 | CF | (Jersey) Brett Pitman | (England) AFC Portchester | Released | |
| 30 June 2022 | CF | (England) Kieran Phillips | (England) Gloucester City | Released | |
| 30 June 2022 | CM | (England) Lucas Tomlinson | (England) Gloucester City | Released | |
| 30 June 2022 | CM | (Republic of Ireland) Glenn Whelan | Coaching Role (Note: Although retained in the role of a coach, Whelan was registered as a player and used throughout the season) | Released | |
| 12 January 2023 | CB | (England) Alfie Kilgour | (England) Mansfield Town | Undisclosed fee | |
| 23 January 2023 | CM | (England) Zain Westbrooke | (England) Doncaster Rovers | Contract terminated | |
| 27 January 2023 | CF | (England) Harvey Saunders | (England) Tranmere Rovers | Undisclosed fee | |
| 7 March 2023 | LB | (England) Sam Heal | (England) Chippenham Town | Free transfer | |
| 21 April 2023 | LB | (England) Nick Anderton | Retired | —N/a | |

=== Loans in ===
| Date | Pos | Player | Loaned from | On loan until | Source |
|---|---|---|---|---|---|
| 12 August 2022 | CB | (England) Lewis Gibson | (England) Everton | End of season | |
| 1 September 2022 | CF | (England) Josh Coburn | (England) Middlesbrough | End of season | |
| 1 September 2022 | RW | (Bulgaria) Sylvester Jasper | (England) Fulham | 22 October 2022 (Note: Jasper returned to Fulham in October 2022 having been unhappy with the amount of game time he had been receiving) | |
| 1 September 2022 | CB | (England) Bobby Thomas | (England) Burnley | 14 January 2023 (Note: On 14 January, Thomas' loan from Burnley was terminated) | |
| 19 January 2023 | GK | (England) Ellery Balcombe | (England) Brentford | End of season | |
| 20 January 2023 | CB | (England) Jarell Quansah | (England) Liverpool | End of season | |
| 31 January 2023 | DM | (Netherlands) Lamare Bogarde | (England) Aston Villa | End of season | |

=== Loans out ===
| Date | Pos | Player | Loaned to | On loan until | Ref. |
|---|---|---|---|---|---|
| 6 August 2022 | CB | (Republic of Ireland) Jamie Egan | (England) Gloucester City | September 2022 | |
| 12 August 2022 | GK | (England) Jed Ward | (England) Hungerford Town | End of Season (Note: On 7 September, Ward's loan at Hungerford was extended until the end of the season.) | |
| 6 September 2022 | CF | (England) Harvey Greenslade | (England) Chippenham Town | 1 January 2023 | |
| 26 September 2022 | LB | (England) Sam Heal | (England) North Leigh | 31 December 2022 (Note: On 25 October, Heal's loan at North Leigh was extended.) | |
| 26 September 2022 | LWB | (England) Ryan Jones | (England) Hungerford Town | October 2022 | |
| 4 November 2022 | CM | (England) Jerry Lawrence | (England) Salisbury | February 2023 | |
| 3 December 2022 | CF | (England) Jarmani Langlais | (England) Frome Town | January 2023 | |
| 8 December 2022 | CF | (England) Jaheim Allen | (England) Bristol Manor Farm | January 2023 | |
| 8 December 2022 | CF | (England) Lucas Vaughan | (England) Bristol Manor Farm | January 2023 | |
| 22 December 2022 | CM | (England) Lene Burden | (England) Hartley Wintney | January 2023 | |
| 6 January 2023 | LB | (Republic of Ireland) Trevor Clarke | (Republic of Ireland) Shamrock Rovers | 30 November 2023 | |
| 3 February 2023 | CB | (Republic of Ireland) Jamie Egan | (England) Weymouth | March 2023 | |
| 10 February 2023 | CF | (England) Jarmani Langlais | (England) Slimbridge | March 2023 | |
| 10 February 2023 | CB | (England) Malik Sesay | (England) Swindon Supermarine | April 2023 | |
| 21 February 2023 | CF | (England) Harvey Greenslade | (England) Truro City | 21 March 2023 | |
| 25 February 2023 | CF | (England) Jaheim Allen | (England) Lydney Town | 25 March 2023 | |
| 4 March 2023 | CB | (Republic of Ireland) Jamie Egan | (England) Hereford | April 2023 | |

== Pre-season and friendlies ==
Win Draw Loss Fixtures

| 1 July 2022 Friendly | Melksham Town | 1–6 | Bristol Rovers | Melksham |
| 19:00 BST | 70' | | Collins 22'; Lawrence 23' (pen.); Greenslade 37'; Gibbons 47'; Jones 65'; Saunders 84' | Stadium: Oakfield Stadium; Attendance: 2,011 |

| 12 July 2022 Friendly | Bath City | 3–1 | Bristol Rovers | Twerton |
| 19:30 BST | Fletcher 30', 39'; Cooke 53' (pen.) | Report | Loft 12' | Stadium: Twerton Park; Attendance: 1,908; Referee: Said Ouchene |

| 12 July 2022 Friendly | Chippenham Town | 1–4 | Bristol Rovers | Chippenham |
| 19:30 BST | Trialist 14' | Report | Marquis 1', 24'; Saunders 29', 55' | Stadium: Hardenhuish Park; Attendance: 343 |

| 16 July 2022 Friendly | Swansea City | 2–1 | Bristol Rovers | Swansea |
| 13:00 BST | Piroe 7'; Congreve 10' | | Collins 11' (pen.) | Stadium: Swansea.com Stadium |

| 19 July 2022 Friendly | Bristol Rovers | 2–0 | Stoke City | Horfield |
| 19:45 BST | Flint 57' (o.g.); Saunders 78' | Report | | Stadium: Memorial Stadium; Referee: Simon Hooper |

| 19 March 2023 Friendly | Aston Villa | 1–3 | Bristol Rovers | Bodymoor Heath |
| | Connolly 85' (o.g.) | Report | Coburn 16'; Loft 57'; Marquis 64' | Stadium: Bodymoor Heath Training Ground; Attendance: 0 (Behind closed doors); Referee: Andre Marriner |

== Competitions ==
=== Overall record ===
| Competition | First match | Last match | Starting round | Final position | Record | | | | | | | |
| Competition | First match | Last match | Starting round | Final position | Pld | W | D | L | GF | GA | GD | Win % |
|---|---|---|---|---|---|---|---|---|---|---|---|---|
| League One | July 2022 | May 2023 | Matchday 1 | 17th | 46 | 14 | 11 | 21 | 58 | 73 | −15 | 30.43 |
| FA Cup | November 2022 | November 2022 | First round | Second round | 2 | 1 | 0 | 1 | 1 | 2 | −1 | 50.00 |
| EFL Cup | August 2022 | August 2022 | First round | First round | 1 | 0 | 0 | 1 | 0 | 1 | −1 | 0.00 |
| EFL Trophy | August 2022 | TBC | Group stage | Quarter-Final | 6 | 4 | 1 | 1 | 12 | 5 | +7 | 66.67 |
| Total | | | | | 55 | 19 | 12 | 24 | 71 | 81 | −10 | 34.55 |

Last updated: 7 May 2023
Source: [ Soccerway]

=== League One ===
==== League One table ====
| Pos | Team | Pld | W | D | L | GF | GA | GD | Pts |
|---|---|---|---|---|---|---|---|---|---|
| 14 | Exeter City | 46 | 15 | 11 | 20 | 64 | 68 | −4 | 56 |
| 15 | Burton Albion | 46 | 15 | 11 | 20 | 57 | 79 | −22 | 56 |
| 16 | Cheltenham Town | 46 | 14 | 12 | 20 | 45 | 61 | −16 | 54 |
| 17 | Bristol Rovers | 46 | 14 | 11 | 21 | 58 | 73 | −15 | 53 |
| 18 | Port Vale | 46 | 13 | 10 | 23 | 48 | 71 | −23 | 49 |
| 19 | Oxford United | 46 | 11 | 14 | 21 | 49 | 56 | −7 | 47 |
| 20 | Cambridge United | 46 | 13 | 7 | 26 | 41 | 68 | −27 | 46 |

Source: EFL Official Website
Rules for classification: 1) Points; 2) Goal difference; 3) Number of goals scored; 4) Head-to-head results; 5) Wins; 6) Away goals; 7) Penalty points (sec 9.5); 8) 12-point sending off offences

==== Results summary ====
| Overall | | | | | | | | Home | | | | | | Away | | | | | |
| Pld | W | D | L | GF | GA | GD | Pts | W | D | L | GF | GA | GD | W | D | L | GF | GA | GD |
|---|---|---|---|---|---|---|---|---|---|---|---|---|---|---|---|---|---|---|---|
| 46 | 14 | 11 | 21 | 58 | 73 | −15 | 53 | 6 | 7 | 10 | 27 | 36 | −9 | 8 | 4 | 11 | 31 | 37 | −6 |

Last updated: 7 May 2023.
Source: [ Soccerway]

==== Results by round ====
| Round | 1 | 2 | 3 | 4 | 5 | 6 | 7 | 8 | 9 | 10 | 11 | 12 | 13 | 14 | 15 | 16 | 17 | 18 | 19 | 20 | 21 | 22 | 23 | 24 | 25 | 26 | 27 | 28 | 29 | 30 | 31 | 32 | 33 | 34 | 35 | 36 | 37 | 38 | 39 | 40 | 41 | 42 | 43 | 44 | 45 | 46 |
|---|---|---|---|---|---|---|---|---|---|---|---|---|---|---|---|---|---|---|---|---|---|---|---|---|---|---|---|---|---|---|---|---|---|---|---|---|---|---|---|---|---|---|---|---|---|---|
| Ground | H | A | H | A | A | H | H | A | H | H | A | H | A | A | H | A | A | H | H | A | H | A | A | H | H | A | A | A | H | A | H | H | A | H | A | H | H | H | A | H | H | A | A | A | A | H |
| Result | L | W | W | L | L | D | D | L | L | L | D | W | W | W | D | D | L | D | W | D | W | W | L | L | W | W | L | L | L | L | D | L | W | D | W | L | L | W | W | D | L | L | L | D | L | L |
| Position | 19 | 8 | 3 | 10 | 15 | 15 | 16 | 18 | 21 | 21 | 21 | 19 | 15 | 11 | 13 | 14 | 16 | 17 | 15 | 13 | 13 | 9 | 10 | 12 | 11 | 8 | 8 | 12 | 13 | 14 | 14 | 15 | 13 | 15 | 13 | 14 | 15 | 15 | 14 | 15 | 15 | 15 | 15 | 15 | 17 | 17 |

Updated to match(es) played on 7 May 2023. Source: [ Soccerway]
A = Away; H = Home; W = Win; D = Draw; L = Loss; P = Postponed

==== Matches ====
Win Draw Loss Fixtures

The league fixtures were announced on 23 June 2022.

| 30 July 2022 1 | Bristol Rovers | 1–2 | Forest Green Rovers | Horfield |
| 15:00 BST | Collins 71'; Evans (yellow card) 80' | Report | Stevenson (yellow card) 28'; Moore-Taylor 55'; O'Keeffe (yellow card) 61'; Hendry 89'; Matt (yellow card) 90+3'; Cargill (yellow card) 90+5' | Stadium: Memorial Stadium; Attendance: 9,064; Referee: Robert Lewis |

| 6 August 2022 2 | Burton Albion | 0–4 | Bristol Rovers | Burton upon Trent |
| 15:00 BST | Shaughnessy (red card) 1'; Smith (yellow card) 14'; Butcher (yellow card) 64' | Report | Evans 4'; Connolly 12'; Collins 40', 44'; Whelan (yellow card) 72' | Stadium: Pirelli Stadium; Attendance: 3,363; Referee: Ross Joyce |

| 13 August 2022 3 | Bristol Rovers | 1–0 | Oxford United | Horfield |
| 12:30 BST | Marquis 34'; Saunders (yellow card) 65'; Grant (yellow card) 90+2' | Report | Seddon (yellow card) 29'; Moore (yellow card) 40'; Brannagan (yellow card) 90+3' | Stadium: Memorial Stadium; Attendance: 8,297; Referee: Oliver Langford |

| 16 August 2022 4 | Barnsley | 3–0 | Bristol Rovers | Barnsley |
| 19:45 BST | Cole 3'; Williams 13'; Benson 56' | Report | Finley (yellow card) 35'; Coutts (yellow card) 35'; Connolly (yellow card) 58' | Stadium: Oakwell Stadium; Attendance: 9,689; Referee: Darren Drysdale |

| 20 August 2022 5 | Portsmouth | 3–1 | Bristol Rovers | Milton |
| 15:00 BST | Ogilvie 32'; Pack (yellow card) 57'; Morrison (yellow card) 73'; Pigott 82' (pen.); Scarlett (yellow card) 88'; Dale 90+2' | Report | Whelan (yellow card) 20'; Gibson (yellow card) 53'; Collins 61'; Rossiter (yellow card) 72'; Finley (yellow card) 85'; Coutts (yellow card) 86' | Stadium: Fratton Park; Attendance: 18,842; Referee: Gavin Ward |

| 27 August 2022 6 | Bristol Rovers | 1–1 | Shrewsbury Town | Horfield |
| 15:00 BST | Marquis (yellow card) 57'; Loft 68' | Report | Bowman (yellow card) 65', (goal) 79' | Stadium: Memorial Stadium; Attendance: 8,570; Referee: Sam Purkiss |

| 3 September 2022 7 | Bristol Rovers | 2–2 | Morecambe | Horfield |
| 15:00 BST | Loft 29'; Thomas 80', (yellow card) 90+1'; McCormick (yellow card) 90+5' | Report | Weir 12'; Gibson (yellow card) 16'; Phillips 53' | Stadium: Memorial Stadium; Attendance: 8,821; Referee: Dean Whitestone |

| 10 September 2022 | Milton Keynes Dons | Postponed | Bristol Rovers | Denbigh |
| 15:00 BST | | Report | | Stadium: Stadium MK |
Note: Following the death of Elizabeth II on 8 September 2022, all EFL fixtures from the 9–11 September 2022 were postponed as a mark of respect.

| 13 September 2022 8 | Ipswich Town | 2–0 | Bristol Rovers | Ipswich |
| 19:45 BST | Morsy (yellow card) 15'; Chaplin 24'; Harness (yellow card) 50'; Evans 55'; John-Jules (yellow card) 86' | Report | Hoole (yellow card) 66'; Thomas (yellow card) 81' (yellow-red card) 85'; Kilgour (red card) 90+2' | Stadium: Portman Road; Attendance: 22,209; Referee: Alan Young |

| 17 September 2022 9 | Bristol Rovers | 3–6 | Lincoln City | Horfield |
| 15:00 BST | Evans (yellow card) 8'; Collins 18', 65'; Finley (yellow card) 59'; Loft 59' | Report | House 7', 61'; Diamond 14' (pen.), 45+1', 56'; Virtue 51' | Stadium: Memorial Stadium; Attendance: 8,078; Referee: Tom Nield |

| 24 September 2022 10 | Bristol Rovers | 0–1 | Accrington Stanley | Horfield |
| 15:00 BST | Loft (yellow card) 61'; Evans (yellow card) 90+4' | Report | Astley (yellow card) 43'; Pritchard 54'; McConville (yellow card) 71'; Rodgers (yellow card) 90+3' | Stadium: Memorial Stadium; Attendance: 8,906; Referee: Lee Swabey |

| 1 October 2022 11 | Exeter City | 2–2 | Bristol Rovers | Exeter |
| 15:00 BST | Key (yellow card) 37'; Sweeney (yellow card) 77'; Brown 72' (pen.); Nombe 81' | Report | Evans (yellow card) 15'; Finley (yellow card) 33'; Marquis 62'; Loft 90+2' | Stadium: St James Park; Attendance: 7,816; Referee: Declan Bourne |

| 8 October 2022 12 | Bristol Rovers | 2–1 | Cambridge United | Horfield |
| 15:00 BST | Taylor 17' (o.g.); Belshaw (yellow card) 34'; Coburn (yellow card) 47' (goal) 56'; Collins (yellow card) 53'; Loft (yellow card) 86' | Report | Digby (yellow card) 26'; Ironside 35' (pen.); Smith (yellow card) 39' | Stadium: Memorial Stadium; Attendance: 9,009; Referee: Ben Toner |

| 11 October 2022 13 | Milton Keynes Dons | 0–1 | Bristol Rovers | Denbigh |
| 19:45 BST | Harvie (yellow card) 16'; Jules (yellow card) 63'; Robson (yellow card) 87' | Report | Collins (yellow card) 15'; Thomas (yellow card) 33'; Evans 76' (pen.) | Stadium: Stadium MK; Attendance: 6,466; Referee: Scott Oldham |

| 15 October 2022 14 | Cheltenham Town | 1–4 | Bristol Rovers | Cheltenham |
| 15:00 BST | Sercombe 54' | Report | Collins 15', 45+2'; Evans 23'; Thomas 42'; Gibson (yellow card) 71' | Stadium: Whaddon Road; Attendance: 5,145; Referee: Sam Barrott |

| 22 October 2022 15 | Bristol Rovers | 2–2 | Plymouth Argyle | Horfield |
| 15:00 BST | Loft (yellow card) 37'; Coburn 47'; Collins 57' | Report | Azaz 14'; Houghton (yellow card) 23'; Randell (yellow card) 31' (goal) 45+2'; Galloway (yellow card) 69'; Lonwijk (yellow card) 90+1' | Stadium: Memorial Stadium; Attendance: 9,258; Referee: Christopher Pollard |

| 26 October 2022 16 | Sheffield Wednesday | 1–1 | Bristol Rovers | Owlerton, Sheffield |
| 20:00 BST | Ihiekwe (yellow card) 36'; Smith 45+3' | Report | Rossiter (yellow card) 39'; Coburn 60' | Stadium: Hillsborough Stadium; Attendance: 22,006; Referee: Oliver Langford |

| 29 October 2022 17 | Derby County | 4–2 | Bristol Rovers | Derby |
| 15:00 BST | McGoldrick 5', 24', 40' (yellow card) 59'; Collins 12'; Hourihane (yellow card) 34'; Roberts (yellow card) 72'; Wildsmith (yellow card) 90' | Report | Gordon (yellow card) 23'; Thomas 35'; Evans 45+3' (pen.) | Stadium: Pride Park Stadium; Attendance: 27,841; Referee: Martin Coy |

| 12 November 2022 18 | Bristol Rovers | 2–2 | Fleetwood Town | Horfield |
| 15:00 GMT | Coburn 57'; Gordon (yellow card) 68'; Collins (yellow card) 75' (goal) 80'; Belshaw (yellow card) 90+1'; Rossiter (yellow card) 90+4' | Report | Rooney 14', 90+9'; Lynch (yellow card) 68'; Batty (yellow card) 73' | Stadium: Memorial Stadium; Attendance: 8,829; Referee: Bobby Madden |

| 19 November 2022 19 | Bristol Rovers | 1–0 | Peterborough United | Horfield |
| 15:00 GMT | Thomas (yellow card) 51'; Sinclair 53' | Report | Edwards (red card) 75' | Stadium: Memorial Stadium; Attendance: 8,635; Referee: Peter Wright |

| 2 December 2022 20 | Bolton Wanderers | 1–1 | Bristol Rovers | Horwich |
| 19:45 GMT | Thomason (yellow card) 24'; Charles 90+4' | Report | Coburn 2'; Clarke (yellow card) 67'; Gibson (yellow card) 88'; Finley (yellow card) 90+6' | Stadium: University of Bolton Stadium; Attendance: 16,786; Referee: Robert Lewis |

| 10 December 2022 21 | Bristol Rovers | 1–0 | Port Vale | Horfield |
| 15:00 GMT | Coutts (yellow card) 43'; Collins 87' | Report | Politic (yellow card) 63'; Butterworth (yellow card) 85' | Stadium: Memorial Stadium; Attendance: 8,264; Referee: Carl Brook |

| 17 December 2022 22 | Charlton Athletic | 1–2 | Bristol Rovers | Charlton |
| 15:00 GMT | Inniss 20' | Report | Evans (yellow card) 29'; Coutts (yellow card) 47'; Marquis 61', 72' | Stadium: The Valley; Attendance: 12,340; Referee: Sam Allison |

| 26 December 2022 23 | Wycombe Wanderers | 2–1 | Bristol Rovers | High Wycombe |
| 15:00 GMT | Obita (yellow card) 13'; Wheeler 22'; Grimmer (yellow card) 35'; Wing 48' (yellow card) 66' | Report | Coburn 4'; Thomas (yellow card) 8'; Gibson (yellow card) 45+2' | Stadium: Adams Park; Attendance: 6,664; Referee: Sunny Sukhvir Gill |

| 29 December 2022 24 | Bristol Rovers | 3–4 | Exeter City | Horfield |
| 19:45 GMT | Collins (yellow card) 25' (goal) 57'; Coburn 64'; Sinclair 74' | Report | Nombe 13', 90+2' (yellow card) 90+2'; Diabate (yellow card) 40'; Caprice (yellow card) 45'; Collins 45+2' (yellow card) 72'; Brown (yellow card) 59'; Sparkes (yellow card) 68'; Dieng 85' | Stadium: Memorial Stadium; Attendance: 9,735; Referee: Simon Mather |

| 1 January 2023 25 | Bristol Rovers | 2–1 | Cheltenham Town | Horfield |
| 15:00 GMT | Collins 25'; Coburn 39'; Loft (yellow card) 90+7' | Report | May 48'; Ferry (yellow card) 79' | Stadium: Memorial Stadium; Attendance: 9,649; Referee: Ollie Yates |

| 7 January 2023 26 | Cambridge United | 1–2 | Bristol Rovers | Cambridge |
| 15:00 GMT | Smith 5'; Seddon (yellow card) 41'; Digby (yellow card) 48'; Lankester (yellow card) 89' | Report | Connolly (yellow card) 12'; Loft (yellow card) 14'; Coburn 21'; Sinclair 29'; Coutts (yellow card) 56'; Marquis (yellow card) 90+1' | Stadium: Abbey Stadium; Attendance: 5,703; Referee: Thomas Parsons |

| 14 January 2023 27 | Accrington Stanley | 2–0 | Bristol Rovers | Accrington |
| 15:00 GMT | Coyle (yellow card) 38'; Leigh 51'; Rodgers (yellow card) 55'; Astley 79'; Martin (yellow card) 86'; Hamilton (yellow card) 89' | Report | Sinclair (yellow card) 26'; Finley (yellow card) 90+4' | Stadium: Wham Stadium; Attendance: 2,510; Referee: Tom Nield |

| 21 January 2023 | Bristol Rovers | Postponed | Wycombe Wanderers | Horfield |
| 15:00 GMT | | Report | | Stadium: Memorial Stadium |
Note: Match postponed on Friday 20 January following a pitch inspection on account of the freezing conditions.

| 28 January 2023 28 | Morecambe | 5–1 | Bristol Rovers | Morecambe |
| 15:00 GMT | Crowley 20'; Gibson (yellow card) 45+2'; Connolly 47' (o.g.); Love 49'; Stockton 62'; Mayor 88' (yellow card) 90+5' | Report | Connolly (yellow card) 42'; Collins 90'; McCormick (yellow card) 90+3' | Stadium: Mazuma Stadium; Attendance: 4,259; Referee: Will Finnie |

| 4 February 2023 29 | Bristol Rovers | 0–2 | Milton Keynes Dons | Horfield |
| 15:00 GMT | Coutts (yellow card) 18'; Finley (yellow card) 58' | Report | Eisa 2' (pen.); Devoy (yellow card) 45+2'; Maghoma (yellow card) 68'; Leko (yellow card) 76'; Johnson (yellow card) 76'; Dean 90+1' (yellow card) 90+4' | Stadium: Memorial Stadium; Attendance: 8,429; Referee: Carl Boyeson |

| 11 February 2023 30 | Lincoln City | 1–0 | Bristol Rovers | Lincoln |
| 15:00 GMT | Poole 14' | Report | McCormick (yellow card) 25'; Loft (red card) 42'; Gibbons (yellow card) 68'; Quansah (yellow card) 88' | Stadium: Sincil Bank; Attendance: 8,025; Referee: Tom Reeves |

| 14 February 2023 31 | Bristol Rovers | 0–0 | Ipswich Town | Horfield |
| 19:45 GMT | | Report | Clarke (yellow card) 86' | Stadium: Memorial Stadium; Attendance: 8,542; Referee: Paul Howard |

| 18 February 2023 32 | Bristol Rovers | 1–2 | Burton Albion | Horfield |
| 15:00 GMT | Marquis 9' | Report | McCann (yellow card) 11'; Moon (yellow card) 36'; Kirk 44'; Winnall 55'; Powell (yellow card) 63' | Stadium: Memorial Stadium; Attendance: 8,164; Referee: Christopher Pollard |

| 25 February 2023 33 | Oxford United | 0–3 | Bristol Rovers | Littlemore, Oxford |
| 15:00 GMT | Bate (yellow card) 37'; Brannagan (yellow card) 67' | Report | Sinclair 22' (pen.); Collins 28' (yellow card) 40'; Quansah (yellow card) 55'; Hoole 75' | Stadium: Kassam Stadium; Attendance: 8,437; Referee: Charles Breakspear |

| 4 March 2023 34 | Bristol Rovers | 0–0 | Barnsley | Horfield |
| 15:00 GMT | Finley (yellow card) 10'; Marquis (yellow card) 12'; Gordon (yellow card) 89' | Report | Russell (yellow card) 37'; Andersen (yellow card) 40' | Stadium: Memorial Stadium; Attendance: 8,816; Referee: Thomas Parsons |

| 11 March 2023 35 | Forest Green Rovers | 1–3 | Bristol Rovers | Nailsworth |
| 15:00 GMT | Savage 12'; Bernard (yellow card) 81' | Report | Marquis 19', 61' (yellow card) 69'; Sinclair 26'; Bogarde (yellow card) 54'; McCormick (yellow card) 81' | Stadium: The New Lawn; Attendance: 4,788; Referee: Scott Oldham |

| 14 March 2023 36 | Bristol Rovers | 0–2 | Wycombe Wanderers | Horfield |
| 15:00 GMT | Bogarde (yellow card) 71' | Report | Hanlan 16'; De Barr (yellow card) 42'; Campbell 62'; Scowen (yellow card) 80' | Stadium: Memorial Stadium; Attendance: 8,533; Referee: Rebecca Welch |

| 18 March 2023 37 | Bristol Rovers | 0–2 | Portsmouth | Horfield |
| 15:00 GMT | Whelan (yellow card) 20'; Ward (yellow card) 36'; Macdonald (yellow card) 68'; Quansah (red card) 89' | Report | Bishop 18', 69' (pen.); Tunnicliffe (yellow card) 77'; Morrell (yellow card) 90' | Stadium: Memorial Stadium; Attendance: 9,448; Referee: James Bell |

| 25 March 2023 | Shrewsbury Town | Postponed | Bristol Rovers | Shrewsbury |
| 15:00 GMT | | | | Stadium: New Meadow |
Note: Fixture was postponed due to Bristol Rovers receiving three international call-ups.

| 1 April 2023 | Plymouth Argyle | Postponed | Bristol Rovers | Plymouth |
| 15:00 BST | | | | Stadium: Home Park |
Note: Fixture was postponed due to Plymouth reaching the 2023 EFL Trophy Final.

| 7 April 2023 38 | Bristol Rovers | 1–0 | Charlton Athletic | Horfield |
| 15:00 BST | Marquis 71' (pen.) | Report | | Stadium: Memorial Stadium; Attendance: 9,613; Referee: Simon Mather |

| 10 April 2023 39 | Fleetwood Town | 1–2 | Bristol Rovers | Fleetwood |
| 15:00 BST | Stockley 22'; Warrington (yellow card) 27'; Wiredu (yellow card) 48'; Rooney (yellow card) 55' | Report | Collins (yellow card) 21'; Gibson 56'; G. Ward 66' | Stadium: Highbury Stadium; Attendance: 3,792; Referee: Sam Barrott |

| 15 April 2023 40 | Bristol Rovers | 1–1 | Derby County | Horfield |
| 15:00 BST | Evans 90+5' (pen.) | Report | McGoldrick 4'; Cashin (yellow card) 50'; Wildsmith (yellow card) 60'; Forsyth (yellow card) 68'; Dobbin (yellow card) 90+1'; White (yellow card) 90+3'; Roberts (yellow card) 90+5' | Stadium: Memorial Stadium; Attendance: 9,388 (1,293 away fans); Referee: Ollie Yates |

| 18 April 2023 41 | Bristol Rovers | 1–2 | Sheffield Wednesday | Horfield |
| 19:45 BST | Collins 46' | Report | Smith (yellow card) 15'; Bannan 28'; Famewo 41'; Vaulks (yellow card) 52'; Palmer (yellow card) 88' | Stadium: Memorial Stadium; Attendance: 8,724; Referee: Josh Smith |

| 22 April 2023 42 | Port Vale | 2–0 | Bristol Rovers | Burslem |
| 15:00 BST | Harrison 22'; Pett 29'; Forrester (yellow card) 64'; Proctor (yellow card) 74' | Report | Ward (yellow card) 34'; Finley (yellow card) 74' | Stadium: Vale Park; Attendance: 7,669; Referee: Sunny Sukhvir Gill |

| 25 April 2023 43 | Plymouth Argyle | 2–0 | Bristol Rovers | Plymouth |
| 15:00 BST | Ennis 51'; Gillesphey 56'; Matete (yellow card) 81' | Report | Evans (yellow card) 13' (yellow-red card) 26'; Loft (yellow card) 86' | Stadium: Home Park; Attendance: 16,254; Referee: Craig Hicks |

| 29 April 2023 44 | Peterborough United | 0–0 | Bristol Rovers | Peterborough |
| 15:00 BST | Norburn (yellow card) 34'; Butler (yellow card) 51'; Taylor (yellow card) 90+1' | Report | Gibbons (yellow card) 44'; Bogarde (yellow card) 45+3'; Finley (yellow card) 45+4'; Loft (yellow card) 51'; Balcombe (yellow card) 81' | Stadium: London Road Stadium; Attendance: 9,494; Referee: Darren Drysdale |

| 2 May 2023 45 | Shrewsbury Town | 2–1 | Bristol Rovers | Shrewsbury |
| 19:45 BST | Leahy 3'; Dunkley (yellow card) 23'; Shipley (yellow card) 36'; Street 53'; Winchester (yellow card) 61'; Phillips (yellow card) 65' | Report | Hoole (yellow card) 59'; Coburn 70'; Collins (yellow card) 82' | Stadium: New Meadow; Attendance: 5,949; Referee: Lee Swabey |

| 7 May 2023 46 | Bristol Rovers | 2–3 | Bolton Wanderers | Horfield |
| 12:00 BST | Hoole 28'; Marquis 85'; Connolly (yellow card) 90+3' | Report | Sheehan (yellow card) 11'; Shoretire 24'; Thomason (yellow card) 52'; Nlundulu 70' (yellow card) 90+3'; Morley 77' | Stadium: Memorial Stadium; Attendance: 10,086; Referee: Will Finnie |

=== FA Cup ===
The draw for the first round was made on 17 October 2022 by Alan Smith and Dion Dublin. The draw for the second round was made on 7 November 2022 by Jermaine Beckford and Mickey Thomas.

Win Draw Loss Fixtures

| 5 November 2022 First round | Bristol Rovers | 1–0 | Rochdale | Horfield |
| 15:00 GMT | Sinclair 65'; Gibbons (yellow card) 69' | Report | John (yellow card) 14'; Odoh (yellow card) 63' | Stadium: Memorial Stadium; Attendance: 4,679; Referee: Will Finnie |

| 27 November 2022 Second round | Bristol Rovers | 0–2 | Boreham Wood | Horfield |
| 14:00 GMT | Clarke (yellow card) 85' | Report | Evans 18'; Stephens 30'; Brunt (yellow card) 37'; Payne (yellow card) 69'; Marsh (yellow card) 90' | Stadium: Memorial Stadium; Attendance: 4,769; Referee: Sam Barrott |

=== EFL Cup ===
Win Draw Loss Fixtures

| 9 August 2022 First round | Crawley Town | 1–0 | Bristol Rovers | Crawley |
| 19:45 BST | Nichols 73' | Report | Evans (yellow card) 45+1'; Loft (yellow card) 89' | Stadium: Broadfield Stadium; Attendance: 1,860; Referee: David Rock |

=== EFL Trophy ===
On 20 June 2022, the Gas were drawn in a group with Plymouth Argyle and Swindon Town, the final group place being taken by one of the invited clubs, later confirmed to be Crystal Palace U21. In the second round, Rovers were drawn away to Colchester United.

| Pos | Div | Team | Pld | W | PW | PL | L | GF | GA | GD | Pts | Qualification |
|---|---|---|---|---|---|---|---|---|---|---|---|---|
| 1 | L1 | Plymouth Argyle | 3 | 2 | 1 | 0 | 0 | 5 | 2 | +3 | 8 | Advance to Round 2 |
| 2 | L1 | Bristol Rovers | 3 | 2 | 0 | 1 | 0 | 6 | 1 | +5 | 7 | Advance to Round 2 |
| 3 | ACA | Crystal Palace U21 | 3 | 1 | 0 | 0 | 2 | 2 | 3 | −1 | 3 | |
| 4 | L2 | Swindon Town | 3 | 0 | 0 | 0 | 3 | 1 | 8 | −7 | 0 | |

Source: EFL.com

Win Draw Loss Fixtures

| 30 August 2022 Group stage | Plymouth Argyle | 1–1 (4–3 p) | Bristol Rovers | Plymouth |
| 19:00 BST | Whittaker (yellow card) 37'; Hardie 58' (pen.) | Report | Loft 50'; Saunders (yellow card) 60'; Rossiter (yellow card) 89' | Stadium: Home Park; Attendance: 2,298; Referee: Carl Brook |
| | Penalties |
| | Azaz (penalty scored); Randell (penalty missed); Gillesphey (penalty scored); Houghton (penalty scored); Ennis (penalty scored) | | Collins (penalty scored); Evans (penalty missed); Greenslade (penalty missed); McCormick (penalty scored); Jones (penalty scored) |

| 4 October 2022 Group stage | Bristol Rovers | 2–0 | Crystal Palace U21 | Horfield |
| 19:00 BST | Kilgour 45+2'; Saunders (yellow card) 55'; Clarke (yellow card) 64' (goal) 73'; Loft (yellow card) 75'; Whelan (red card) 85' | Report | Ozoh (yellow card) 27'; Balmer (yellow card) 84'; Phillips (yellow card) 87' | Stadium: Memorial Stadium; Attendance: 1,058; Referee: James Oldham |

| 18 October 2022 Group stage | Bristol Rovers | 3–0 | Swindon Town | Horfield |
| 19:00 BST | Loft 63'; Anderson 76'; McCormick 83' | Report | Brennan (yellow card) 15' (yellow-red card) 32'; Aguiar (red card) 44'; Reed (yellow card) 48'; Minturn (yellow card) 53'; Lavinier (yellow card) 73' | Stadium: Memorial Stadium; Attendance: 1,700; Referee: David Rock |

| 23 November 2022 Second round | Colchester United | 1–2 | Bristol Rovers | Colchester |
| 19:30 GMT | Sears 83' | Report | Connolly 53'; Saunders 90+5' | Stadium: JobServe Community Stadium; Attendance: 669; Referee: Thomas Kirk |

| 13 December 2022 Third round | Bristol Rovers | 4–1 | Milton Keynes Dons | Horfield |
| 19:30 GMT | Hoole 33'; Marquis 54', 66'; Saunders 71'; Kilgour (red card) 77'; McCormick (yellow card) 82' | Report | Eisa 79' (pen.) | Stadium: Memorial Stadium; Attendance: 864; Referee: Declan Bourne |

| 10 January 2023 Quarter-final | Bristol Rovers | 0–2 | Plymouth Argyle | Horfield |
| 19:45 GMT | Loft (yellow card) 85'; Thomas (yellow card) 90+5' | Report | Waine 24'; Hardie 32'; Lonwijk (yellow card) 77'; Ennis (yellow card) 88' | Stadium: Memorial Stadium; Attendance: 3,742; Referee: Darren Drysdale |

== Statistics ==
Players with squad numbers struck through and marked † left the club during the playing season.
Players with names in italics and marked * were on loan from another club for the whole of their season with Bristol Rovers.

As of match played 7 May 2023

| No. | Pos | Nat | Player | Total | | League One | | FA Cup | | League Cup | | League Trophy | |
| No. | Pos | Nat | Player | Apps | Goals | Apps | Goals | Apps | Goals | Apps | Goals | Apps | Goals |
|---|---|---|---|---|---|---|---|---|---|---|---|---|---|
| 1 | GK | (England) ENG | James Belshaw | 42 | 0 | 38+0 | 0 | 2+0 | 0 | 1+0 | 0 | 0+1 | 0 |
| 2 | DF | (Wales) WAL | James Connolly | 36 | 2 | 24+6 | 1 | 2+0 | 0 | 1+0 | 0 | 3+0 | 1 |
| 3 | DF | (Scotland) SCO | Lewis Gordon | 45 | 0 | 37+2 | 0 | 2+0 | 0 | 1+0 | 0 | 3+0 | 0 |
| 4 | MF | (England) ENG | Josh Grant | 1 | 0 | 0+1 | 0 | 0+0 | 0 | 0+0 | 0 | 0+0 | 0 |
| ~~5~~ † | DF | (England) ENG | Alfie Kilgour | 12 | 1 | 3+5 | 0 | 0+0 | 0 | 1+0 | 0 | 2+1 | 1 |
| 5 | DF | (England) ENG | Jarell Quansah * | 16 | 0 | 15+1 | 0 | 0+0 | 0 | 0+0 | 0 | 0+0 | 0 |
| 6 | MF | (England) ENG | Sam Finley | 43 | 0 | 32+6 | 0 | 1+1 | 0 | 1+0 | 0 | 1+1 | 0 |
| 7 | MF | (England) ENG | Scott Sinclair | 33 | 6 | 21+9 | 5 | 2+0 | 1 | 0+0 | 0 | 0+1 | 0 |
| 8 | MF | (England) ENG | Grant Ward | 19 | 1 | 17+2 | 1 | 0+0 | 0 | 0+0 | 0 | 0+0 | 0 |
| ~~8~~ † | MF | (England) ENG | Zain Westbrooke | 3 | 0 | 1+0 | 0 | 0+0 | 0 | 0+0 | 0 | 2+0 | 0 |
| 9 | FW | (England) ENG | John Marquis | 42 | 11 | 18+18 | 9 | 0+0 | 0 | 1+0 | 0 | 5+0 | 2 |
| 10 | FW | (Wales) WAL | Aaron Collins | 53 | 16 | 44+2 | 16 | 2+0 | 0 | 1+0 | 0 | 2+2 | 0 |
| ~~11~~ † | FW | (Bulgaria) BUL | Sylvester Jasper * | 8 | 0 | 0+6 | 0 | 0+0 | 0 | 0+0 | 0 | 2+0 | 0 |
| 11 | DF | (England) ENG | Calum Macdonald | 4 | 0 | 1+3 | 0 | 0+0 | 0 | 0+0 | 0 | 0+0 | 0 |
| 14 | MF | (England) ENG | Jordan Rossiter | 21 | 0 | 14+3 | 0 | 1+0 | 0 | 0+0 | 0 | 3+0 | 0 |
| 15 | MF | (Scotland) SCO | Paul Coutts | 25 | 0 | 17+5 | 0 | 0+0 | 0 | 0+0 | 0 | 2+1 | 0 |
| 17 | DF | (England) ENG | Lewis Gibson * | 33 | 1 | 28+3 | 1 | 1+0 | 0 | 0+0 | 0 | 0+1 | 0 |
| 18 | FW | (England) ENG | Ryan Loft | 40 | 6 | 17+16 | 4 | 1+0 | 0 | 1+0 | 0 | 3+2 | 2 |
| 19 | MF | (England) ENG | Harry Anderson | 29 | 1 | 12+15 | 0 | 0+0 | 0 | 1+0 | 0 | 1+0 | 1 |
| 20 | DF | (Republic of Ireland) IRL | Trevor Clarke | 15 | 1 | 5+4 | 0 | 0+2 | 0 | 0+0 | 0 | 4+0 | 1 |
| 21 | MF | (England) ENG | Antony Evans | 51 | 5 | 33+10 | 5 | 2+0 | 0 | 1+0 | 0 | 3+2 | 0 |
| 22 | MF | (Netherlands) NED | Lamare Bogarde * | 18 | 0 | 15+3 | 0 | 0+0 | 0 | 0+0 | 0 | 0+0 | 0 |
| ~~22~~ † | FW | (England) ENG | Harvey Saunders | 20 | 2 | 2+10 | 0 | 0+2 | 0 | 0+1 | 0 | 2+3 | 2 |
| 23 | MF | (England) ENG | Luke McCormick | 30 | 1 | 9+13 | 0 | 1+1 | 0 | 0+0 | 0 | 5+1 | 1 |
| 25 | MF | (Republic of Ireland) IRL | Glenn Whelan | 18 | 0 | 3+9 | 0 | 1+1 | 0 | 0+1 | 0 | 3+0 | 0 |
| 27 | FW | (England) ENG | Harvey Greenslade | 1 | 0 | 0+0 | 0 | 0+0 | 0 | 0+0 | 0 | 0+1 | 0 |
| 28 | DF | (England) ENG | James Gibbons | 34 | 0 | 18+10 | 0 | 1+1 | 0 | 0+0 | 0 | 3+1 | 0 |
| 30 | DF | (Wales) WAL | Luca Hoole | 44 | 3 | 28+9 | 2 | 0+0 | 0 | 1+0 | 0 | 6+0 | 1 |
| 31 | GK | (England) ENG | Jed Ward | 1 | 0 | 1+0 | 0 | 0+0 | 0 | 0+0 | 0 | 0+0 | 0 |
| 32 | GK | (Finland) FIN | Anssi Jaakkola | 6 | 0 | 0+0 | 0 | 0+0 | 0 | 0+0 | 0 | 6+0 | 0 |
| 34 | MF | (England) ENG | Jerry Lawrence | 3 | 0 | 0+1 | 0 | 0+0 | 0 | 0+0 | 0 | 2+0 | 0 |
| 35 | GK | (England) ENG | Ellery Balcombe * | 8 | 0 | 7+1 | 0 | 0+0 | 0 | 0+0 | 0 | 0+0 | 0 |
| ~~37~~ † | DF | (England) ENG | Bobby Thomas * | 26 | 3 | 19+0 | 3 | 2+0 | 0 | 0+0 | 0 | 4+1 | 0 |
| 40 | FW | (England) ENG | Josh Coburn * | 40 | 10 | 27+8 | 10 | 1+0 | 0 | 0+0 | 0 | 2+2 | 0 |
| 44 | MF | (England) ENG | Ryan Jones | 2 | 0 | 0+0 | 0 | 0+0 | 0 | 0+1 | 0 | 0+1 | 0 |

=== Goals Record ===
As of match played 7 May 2023

| Rank | No. | Nat. | Po. | Name | League One | FA Cup | League Cup | League Trophy | Total |
|---|---|---|---|---|---|---|---|---|---|
| 1 | 10 | (Wales) | CF | Aaron Collins | 16 | 0 | 0 | 0 | 16 |
| 2 | 9 | (England) | CF | John Marquis | 9 | 0 | 0 | 2 | 11 |
| 3 | 40 | (England) | CF | Josh Coburn | 10 | 0 | 0 | 0 | 10 |
| 4 | 7 | (England) | LW | Scott Sinclair | 5 | 1 | 0 | 0 | 6 |
| 4 | 18 | (England) | CF | Ryan Loft | 4 | 0 | 0 | 2 | 6 |
| 6 | 21 | (England) | AM | Antony Evans | 5 | 0 | 0 | 0 | 5 |
| 7 | 30 | (Wales) | RB | Luca Hoole | 2 | 0 | 0 | 1 | 3 |
| 7 | 37 | (England) | CB | Bobby Thomas | 3 | 0 | 0 | 0 | 3 |
| 9 | 2 | (Wales) | CB | James Connolly | 1 | 0 | 0 | 1 | 2 |
| 9 | 22 | (England) | CF | Harvey Saunders | 0 | 0 | 0 | 2 | 2 |
| 11 | 5 | (England) | CB | Alfie Kilgour | 0 | 0 | 0 | 1 | 1 |
| 11 | 8 | (England) | CM | Grant Ward | 1 | 0 | 0 | 0 | 1 |
| 11 | 17 | (England) | CB | Lewis Gibson | 1 | 0 | 0 | 0 | 1 |
| 11 | 19 | (England) | RW | Harry Anderson | 0 | 0 | 0 | 1 | 1 |
| 11 | 20 | (Republic of Ireland) | LB | Trevor Clarke | 0 | 0 | 0 | 1 | 1 |
| 11 | 23 | (England) | AM | Luke McCormick | 0 | 0 | 0 | 1 | 1 |
| 11 | N/A | | | Own Goals | 1 | 0 | 0 | 0 | 1 |
| Total | | | | | 58 | 1 | 0 | 12 | 71 |

=== Disciplinary record ===
As of match played 7 May 2023

| Rank | No. | Nat. | Po. | Name | League One | | | FA Cup | | | League Cup | | | League Trophy | | | Total | | | |
| Rank | No. | Nat. | Po. | Name | Booked | (yellow card) (yellow-red card) | Sent off (straight red) | Booked | (yellow card) (yellow-red card) | Sent off (straight red) | Booked | (yellow card) (yellow-red card) | Sent off (straight red) | Booked | (yellow card) (yellow-red card) | Sent off (straight red) | Booked | (yellow card) (yellow-red card) | Sent off (straight red) | |
|---|---|---|---|---|---|---|---|---|---|---|---|---|---|---|---|---|---|---|---|---|
| 1 | 18 | (England) | CF | Ryan Loft | 7 | 0 | 1 | 0 | 0 | 0 | 1 | 0 | 0 | 2 | 0 | 0 | 10 | 0 | 1 | |
| 2 | 6 | (England) | CM | Sam Finley | 10 | 0 | 0 | 0 | 0 | 0 | 0 | 0 | 0 | 0 | 0 | 0 | 10 | 0 | 0 | |
| 3 | 10 | (Wales) | CF | Aaron Collins | 7 | 0 | 0 | 0 | 0 | 0 | 0 | 0 | 0 | 0 | 0 | 0 | 7 | 0 | 0 | 0 |
| 3 | 21 | (England) | AM | Antony Evans | 5 | 1 | 0 | 0 | 0 | 0 | 1 | 0 | 0 | 0 | 0 | 0 | 6 | 1 | 0 | |
| 5 | 15 | (Scotland) | DM | Paul Coutts | 6 | 0 | 0 | 0 | 0 | 0 | 0 | 0 | 0 | 0 | 0 | 0 | 6 | 0 | 0 | |
| 5 | 37 | (England) | CB | Bobby Thomas | 4 | 1 | 0 | 0 | 0 | 0 | 0 | 0 | 0 | 1 | 0 | 0 | 5 | 1 | 0 | |
| 7 | 23 | (England) | CM | Luke McCormick | 4 | 0 | 0 | 0 | 0 | 0 | 0 | 0 | 0 | 1 | 0 | 0 | 5 | 0 | 0 | |
| 8 | 2 | (Wales) | CB | James Connolly | 4 | 0 | 0 | 0 | 0 | 0 | 0 | 0 | 0 | 0 | 0 | 0 | 4 | 0 | 0 | |
| 8 | 9 | (England) | CF | John Marquis | 4 | 0 | 0 | 0 | 0 | 0 | 0 | 0 | 0 | 0 | 0 | 0 | 4 | 0 | 0 | |
| 8 | 14 | (England) | CM | Jordan Rossiter | 3 | 0 | 0 | 0 | 0 | 0 | 0 | 0 | 0 | 1 | 0 | 0 | 4 | 0 | 0 | |
| 8 | 17 | (England) | CB | Lewis Gibson | 4 | 0 | 0 | 0 | 0 | 0 | 0 | 0 | 0 | 0 | 0 | 0 | 4 | 0 | 0 | |
| 12 | 3 | (England) | LB | Lewis Gordon | 3 | 0 | 0 | 0 | 0 | 0 | 0 | 0 | 0 | 0 | 0 | 0 | 3 | 0 | 0 | |
| 12 | 5 | (England) | CB | Jarell Quansah | 2 | 0 | 1 | 0 | 0 | 0 | 0 | 0 | 0 | 0 | 0 | 0 | 2 | 0 | 1 | |
| 12 | 20 | (Republic of Ireland) | LB | Trevor Clarke | 1 | 0 | 0 | 1 | 0 | 0 | 0 | 0 | 0 | 1 | 0 | 0 | 3 | 0 | 0 | |
| 12 | 22 | (Netherlands) | DM | Lamare Bogarde | 3 | 0 | 0 | 0 | 0 | 0 | 0 | 0 | 0 | 0 | 0 | 0 | 3 | 0 | 0 | |
| 12 | 22 | (England) | CF | Harvey Saunders | 1 | 0 | 0 | 0 | 0 | 0 | 0 | 0 | 0 | 2 | 0 | 0 | 3 | 0 | 0 | |
| 12 | 25 | (Republic of Ireland) | DM | Glenn Whelan | 2 | 0 | 0 | 0 | 0 | 0 | 0 | 0 | 0 | 0 | 0 | 1 | 2 | 0 | 1 | |
| 12 | 28 | (England) | RB | James Gibbons | 2 | 0 | 0 | 1 | 0 | 0 | 0 | 0 | 0 | 0 | 0 | 0 | 3 | 0 | 0 | |
| 19 | 1 | (England) | GK | James Belshaw | 2 | 0 | 0 | 0 | 0 | 0 | 0 | 0 | 0 | 0 | 0 | 0 | 2 | 0 | 0 | |
| 19 | 5 | (England) | CB | Alfie Kilgour | 0 | 0 | 1 | 0 | 0 | 0 | 0 | 0 | 0 | 0 | 0 | 1 | 0 | 0 | 2 | |
| 19 | 8 | (England) | CM | Grant Ward | 2 | 0 | 0 | 0 | 0 | 0 | 0 | 0 | 0 | 0 | 0 | 0 | 2 | 0 | 0 | |
| 19 | 30 | (Wales) | RB | Luca Hoole | 2 | 0 | 0 | 0 | 0 | 0 | 0 | 0 | 0 | 0 | 0 | 0 | 2 | 0 | 0 | |
| 23 | 4 | (England) | DM | Josh Grant | 1 | 0 | 0 | 0 | 0 | 0 | 0 | 0 | 0 | 0 | 0 | 0 | 1 | 0 | 0 | |
| 23 | 7 | (England) | LW | Scott Sinclair | 1 | 0 | 0 | 0 | 0 | 0 | 0 | 0 | 0 | 0 | 0 | 0 | 1 | 0 | 0 | |
| 23 | 11 | (Scotland) | LB | Calum Macdonald | 1 | 0 | 0 | 0 | 0 | 0 | 0 | 0 | 0 | 0 | 0 | 0 | 1 | 0 | 0 | |
| 23 | 35 | (England) | GK | Ellery Balcombe | 1 | 0 | 0 | 0 | 0 | 0 | 0 | 0 | 0 | 0 | 0 | 0 | 1 | 0 | 0 | |
| 23 | 40 | (England) | CF | Josh Coburn | 1 | 0 | 0 | 0 | 0 | 0 | 0 | 0 | 0 | 0 | 0 | 0 | 1 | 0 | 0 | |
| Total | | | | | 85 | 2 | 3 | 2 | 0 | 0 | 2 | 0 | 0 | 8 | 0 | 2 | 97 | 2 | 5 | |
