= Oscar Halls =

English footballer (born 2004)

Personal information
- Date of birth: 15 November 2004 (age 21)
- Place of birth: Watford, England
- Position: Defender

Youth career
- 2016–2022: Plymouth Argyle

Senior career*
Years	Team	Apps	(Gls)
2022–2024	Plymouth Argyle	0	(0)
2023-2024	→ Plymouth Parkway (loan)	30	(2)
2024-	→ Loyola University	27	(1)
2024-	→ Mousehole	2	(0)
- * Club domestic league appearances and goals as of 8 January 2024 (UTC)

Oscar Halls (born 15 November 2004) is an English professional footballer who plays as a defender for Loyola Greyhounds of the Patriot League in the US. He previously played for EFL League One club Plymouth Argyle.

== Career ==
Halls signed a professional contract with Plymouth Argyle on his seventeenth birthday, having been with the club since being in the under-10s and travelling to training from his hometown of Penzance three times a week. He attended Mounts Bay Academy. He made his first-team debut on 30 August 2022, playing the full 90 minutes of a 1–1 draw with Bristol Rovers at Home Park in a group stage match in the EFL Trophy. He scored his first senior goal on 20 September, scoring a headed goal in a 3–1 victory at Swindon Town. He was one of four second-year apprentices to turn professional at the end of the 2022–23 season.

On 10 May 2024, the club announced he would be released in the summer once his contract expired.

In summer 2024 Halls joined Loyola Greyhounds, the soccer team representing Loyola University Maryland.

== Career statistics ==
As of match played 22 November 2022

Appearances and goals by club, season and competition
Club	Season	League			FA Cup		EFL Cup		Other		Total	
Club	Season	Division	Apps	Goals	Apps	Goals	Apps	Goals	Apps	Goals	Apps	Goals
Plymouth Argyle	2022–23	EFL League One	0	0	0	0	0	0	6	1	6	1
Plymouth Parkway (loan)	2023–24	Southern League Premier	30	2	3	1	—		1	0	34	3
Career total			30	2	3	1	0	0	7	1	40	4
