= Ryan Loft =

English footballer (born 1997)

Personal information
- Full name: Ryan George Henson Loft
- Date of birth: 14 September 1997 (age 29)
- Place of birth: Gravesend, England
- Height: 6 ft 3 in (1.90 m)
- Position: Striker

Team information
- Current team: Hornchurch (on loan from Cambridge United)
- Number: 30

Youth career
- Dartford
- Ebbsfleet United
- 2013–2015: Tottenham Hotspur

Senior career*
Years	Team	Apps	(Gls)
2015–2018	Tottenham Hotspur	0	(0)
2016	→ Braintree Town (loan)	0	(0)
2017	→ Stevenage (loan)	9	(0)
2018	→ Exeter City (loan)	1	(0)
2018–2020	Leicester City	0	(0)
2019–2020	→ Carlisle United (loan)	26	(4)
2020–2022	Scunthorpe United	56	(12)
2022–2023	Bristol Rovers	50	(5)
2023–2024	Port Vale	26	(1)
2024–	Cambridge United	35	(2)
2025–2026	→ Crawley Town (loan)	15	(3)
2026–	→ Hornchurch (loan)	4	(0)
- * Club domestic league appearances and goals as of 21:45, 8 November 2026 (UTC)

Ryan George Henson Loft (born 14 September 1997) is an English professional footballer who plays as a striker for National League club Hornchurch, on loan from EFL League One club Cambridge United.

Loft began his senior career at Tottenham Hotspur, having previously been a part of the youth-team set-up at Dartford and Ebbsfleet United. He never played a first-team game for Spurs but instead had brief loan spells with Braintree Town, Stevenage and Exeter City. He then spent 2018 to 2020 at Premier League club Leicester City, though he only featured for the under-23 team in the EFL Trophy. He spent the 2019–20 season on loan at Carlisle United and signed with Scunthorpe United in August 2020 following his release from Leicester. He scored 15 goals in 62 games before securing a move to Bristol Rovers for around £50,000 in January 2022. Rovers would secure promotion out League Two at the end of the 2021–22 season and then sell Loft to Port Vale in September 2023. He joined Cambridge United for an undisclosed fee in July 2024. He joined Crawley Town on a season-long loan in September 2025 and was loaned to Hornchurch in October 2026.

== Early and personal life ==
Born in Gravesend, Loft attended Northfleet Technology College, where he was a high jump champion.

== Career ==
=== Tottenham Hotspur ===
After playing for Dartford and Ebbsfleet United, Loft joined Tottenham Hotspur for the 2013–14 season. He scored a hat-trick for the under-18 team in a 3–0 win over Norwich City in October 2015. He moved to National League club Braintree Town on 4 March 2016 on a 'work experience' deal. Manager Danny Cowley said he was signed to provide depth to the squad and to gain experience. However, Loft did not feature for Braintree and found that Shayon Harrison was preferred by Ugo Ehiogu for the Spurs under-23 team. He signed on loan for Stevenage on 7 January 2017, remaining until the end of the 2016–17 season. Boro manager Darren Sarll compared him to a young Duncan Ferguson. Loft made his English Football League debut later that day on 7 January, in a 3–1 victory over Newport County at Broadhall Way. He featured in a total of nine League Two games for the club, all as a substitute.

He scored his first goal in senior football on 15 August 2017, as Tottenham U23 drew 2–2 with Luton Town in the EFL Trophy. He returned to League Two on loan at Exeter City on 22 January 2018, where manager Paul Tisdale looked to gain "some strength in depth". The loan was to run until the end of the 2017–18 season, though he only played 45 minutes of League Two football in a 1–0 defeat to Mansfield Town at St James Park. He was released by Tottenham at the end of the 2017–18 season.

=== Leicester City ===
On 14 July 2018, Loft signed a two-year contract with Leicester City. He scored three goals in three EFL Trophy games for Steve Beaglehole's development squad. He moved on loan to League Two side Carlisle United on 2 August 2019. He did not feature regularly under Steven Pressley, but managed to score his fifth goal for the Blues upon being handed a rare start under caretaker manager Gavin Skelton in November. New manager Chris Beech commented that Loft "had a little bit of an issue in terms of being part of a disciplined group of people" and largely restricted him to reserve team football. Loft ended the 2019–20 campaign with six goals in 35 games, of which only nine appearances were starts in the league, and was released by Leicester at the end of the 2019–20 season.

=== Scunthorpe United ===
On 31 August 2020, Loft signed for League Two club Scunthorpe United on a two-year contract following a long pursuit by manager Neil Cox. He scored goals in each of his first two appearances of the 2020–21 season at Glanford Park. The Iron struggled, however, though found some form in January, when Loft scored a brace against Port Vale to secure back-to-back wins. He ended the campaign with nine goals in 43 appearances, finishing as joint-top scorer alongside Abo Eisa. Loft scored six goals in 19 games in the first half of the 2021–22 season and new manager Keith Hill admitted that his departure made the relegation-threatened club weaker. Valued at around £50,000, his sale was seen as vital for Scunthorpe's immediate financial survival.

=== Bristol Rovers ===
On 4 January 2022, Loft joined fellow League Two side Bristol Rovers for an undisclosed fee, signing a two-and-a-half-year deal with the club. He made his debut in a 2–0 win over Hartlepool United at the Memorial Stadium. Loft opened his account for the club on 18 April, scoring the third goal in injury time to secure a vital win for Rovers over promotion rivals Port Vale, lifting the ball over the onrushing Vale goalkeeper after being played through by Sam Finley. The season ended with a first career promotion for Loft, a 7–0 victory over Loft's former club Scunthorpe seeing Rovers overtake Northampton Town into the final automatic promotion place on goals scored.

Loft started the 2022–23 season by scoring five goals in a six-match spell from August to September 2022. Loft had impressed manager Joey Barton with his willingness to work for the team having returned to pre-season in fitter shape, becoming a permanent fixture in the starting line-up. Barton commented in October that Loft was "unplayable at times". Loft did though then miss a month due to a slight hamstring problem. He did not add to his goal tally upon returning to fitness and ended the campaign with six goals in 41 appearances, and was sent off for the first time in his career after fouling Carl Rushworth during a 1–0 defeat at Lincoln City. Loft was limited to three substitute appearances at the start of the 2023–24 season after finding himself behind Aaron Collins, Jevani Brown and John Marquis in the pecking order.

=== Port Vale ===
On 1 September 2023, Loft signed a two-year contract with League One side Port Vale after being purchased for an undisclosed fee. David Flitcroft, the club's director of football, said that he had pursued the striker all throughout the summer due to "his willingness to run unselfishly for the team, creating space or pressing the opposition aggressively". He scored his first goal for the club on his 15th appearance, scoring in extra-time of a 3–3 draw with Stevenage in an FA Cup second round tie at Vale Park, though he went on to miss the final penalty kick of the shoot-out defeat. Manager Andy Crosby said that "good on him for it [volunteering to take a penalty] because he is not in the greatest state obviously mentally (in terms of confidence), but he was immense when he came on. I was delighted for him. He scored a goal and I want him to build on that". He struggled for form, however, and lost his place in the team as fans turned against him. Injury to Uche Ikpeazu allowed him to regain his first-team place in the second half of the campaign. Loft scored his first league goal for the club on 23 March to secure a 1–0 win at Burton Albion.

=== Cambridge United ===
On 10 July 2024, Loft joined League One club Cambridge United on a three-year deal (with a club option on a fourth year) after moving for an undisclosed fee. He had to wait until 5 October to make his first start for the club as he began the 2024–25 campaign injured. Manager Garry Monk said in December that he and the players were fully behind Loft following a poor start to his time at the club. He scored his first goal for the club on 25 January in a 3–2 win over Mansfield Town at the Abbey Stadium and then followed this with another goal three days later in a defeat at Rotherham United. Speaking two months later, new manager Neil Harris said that Loft was still finding his way in a Cambridge shirt. Loft was sent off in the game that confirmed Cambridge's relegation into League Two after a touchline confrontation with Burton Albion's Udoka Godwin-Malife. He was then dropped by Harris.

On 1 September 2025, he joined League Two rivals Crawley Town on loan for the rest of the 2025–26 season. Manager Scott Lindsey stated that he would bring "nous and experience to the team" and that he was looking forward to utilising Loft's size and pace up front. Five days later he was sent off on his debut for Crawley after receiving a second yellow card in stoppage time of a 1–0 victory at Harrogate Town. He was sent off for an off-the-ball incident in an FA Cup defeat at Boreham Wood on 1 November. He did not feature from New Year's Day until 18 April, at which point new Crawley manager Colin Kazim-Richards said he could have a "massive impact" in the club's battle against relegation. Cambridge secured promotion back in his absence.

On 6 October 2026, Loft joined National League club Hornchurch on loan until the following January. Manager Daryl McMahon described him as a "a big target man, willing runner, really, really good experience and a top lad".

== Style of play ==
Loft is a 6 feet 3 inches (1.90 m) striker who can hold the ball up front and provide a link between the midfield and attack. He described himself as "a strong powerful striker who's very quick for my size. I like being deceivingly quick as a tall player".

== Career statistics ==
As of match played 7 November 2026

Appearances and goals by club, season and competition
Club	Season	League			FA Cup		League Cup		Other		Total	
Club	Season	Division	Apps	Goals	Apps	Goals	Apps	Goals	Apps	Goals	Apps	Goals
Tottenham Hotspur	2015–16	Premier League	0	0	0	0	0	0	0	0	0	0
Tottenham Hotspur	2016–17	Premier League	0	0	0	0	0	0	0	0	0	0
Tottenham Hotspur	2017–18	Premier League	0	0	0	0	0	0	0	0	0	0
Tottenham Hotspur	Total		0	0	0	0	0	0	0	0	0	0
Braintree Town (loan)	2015–16	National League	0	0	—		—		—		0	0
Stevenage (loan)	2016–17	League Two	9	0	—		—		—		9	0
Exeter City (loan)	2017–18	League Two	1	0	—		—		—		1	0
Tottenham Hotspur U23	2017–18	—			—		—		3 (Note: Appearance(s) in EFL Trophy)	1	3	1
Leicester City	2018–19	Premier League	0	0	0	0	0	0	—		0	0
Leicester City	2019–20	Premier League	0	0	0	0	0	0	—		0	0
Leicester City	Total		0	0	0	0	0	0	0	0	0	0
Leicester City U23	2018–19	—			—		—		3	3	3	3
Carlisle United (loan)	2019–20	League Two	26	4	5	0	1	0	3	2	35	6
Scunthorpe United	2020–21	League Two	41	8	0	0	1	1	1	0	43	9
Scunthorpe United	2021–22	League Two	15	4	1	0	1	0	2	2	19	6
Scunthorpe United	Total		56	12	1	0	2	1	3	2	62	15
Bristol Rovers	2021–22	League Two	13	1	0	0	—		—		13	1
Bristol Rovers	2022–23	League One	34	4	1	0	1	0	5	2	41	6
Bristol Rovers	2023–24	League One	3	0	0	0	0	0	0	0	3	0
Bristol Rovers	Total		50	5	1	0	1	0	5	2	57	7
Port Vale	2023–24	League One	26	1	4	1	2	0	3	0	35	2
Cambridge United	2024–25	League One	32	2	1	0	0	0	1	0	34	2
Cambridge United	2025–26	League Two	3	0	0	0	1	1	0	0	4	1
Cambridge United	2026–27	League One	0	0	0	0	0	0	0	0	0	0
Cambridge United	Total		35	2	1	0	1	1	1	0	38	3
Crawley Town (loan)	2025–26	League Two	15	3	1	0	—		3	1	19	4
Hornchurch (loan)	2026–27	National League	4	0	1	0	—		2 (Note: Appearances in National League Cup))	1	7	1
Career total			222	27	14	1	7	2	26	12	269	42

== Honours ==
Bristol Rovers

- EFL League Two third-place promotion: 2021–22
