= Jamarni Langlais =

English footballer

Personal information
- Full name: Jamarni Patrick Langlais
- Date of birth: 2004 or 2005 (age 21–22)
- Position: Forward

Youth career
- –2019: Cardiff City
- 2019–2023: Bristol Rovers

Senior career*
Years	Team	Apps	(Gls)
2021–2023	Bristol Rovers	0	(0)
2022	→ Frome Town (loan)	1	(0)
2023	→ Slimbridge (loan)	7	(1)
2023	→ Ashton & Backwell United (loan)		
2023	Roman Glass St George		
2023–2024	Paulton Rovers	17	(4)
- * Club domestic league appearances and goals as of 16:14, 7 November 2023 (UTC)

Jamarni Patrick Langlais is an English association footballer who plays as a forward.

== Career ==
He made his first appearance in senior football in 2021 in a pre-season friendly against Plymouth Argyle, aged just sixteen.

His competitive debut came as a substitute in a EFL Cup first round tie against Cheltenham Town on 10 August 2021.

On 3 December 2022, Langlais joined Southern League Division One club Frome Town on loan. In February 2023, he joined Slimbridge on a one-month loan deal.

Ahead of the 2023–24 season, he joined Hellenic League Premier Division club Roman Glass St George. In December 2023, he joined Southern League Division One South side Paulton Rovers.

== Career statistics ==
As of match played 7 March 2023

Appearances and goals by club, season and competition
Club	Season	League			FA Cup		League Cup		Other		Total	
Club	Season	Division	Apps	Goals	Apps	Goals	Apps	Goals	Apps	Goals	Apps	Goals
Bristol Rovers	2021–22	League Two	0	0	0	0	1	0	1 (Note: Appearance(s) in EFL Trophy)	0	2	0
Frome Town (loan)	2022–23	SL Division One South	1	0	—		—		0	0	1	0
Slimbridge (loan)	2022–23	SL Division One South	7	1	—		—		0	0	7	1
Career Total			8	1	0	0	1	0	1	0	10	1
