= Harvey Greenslade =

Association footballer

Personal information
- Full name: Harvey Thomas Greenslade
- Date of birth: 8 April 2004 (age 22)
- Place of birth: Bristol, England
- Height: 6 ft 1 in (1.86 m)
- Position: Striker

Team information
- Current team: Truro City

Youth career
- Bristol Rovers

Senior career*
Years	Team	Apps	(Gls)
2021–2024	Bristol Rovers	0	(0)
2021	→ Cinderford Town (loan)	3	(0)
2022	→ Tuffley Rovers (loan)	6	(3)
2022	→ Tiverton Town (loan)	3	(0)
2022–2023	→ Chippenham Town (loan)	10	(1)
2023	→ Truro City (loan)	13	(4)
2023	→ Truro City (loan)	19	(4)
2024	→ Oxford City (loan)	16	(3)
2024–2026	Yeovil Town	68	(5)
2024–2025	→ Weston-super-Mare (loan)	4	(0)
2026–	Truro City	0	(0)
- * Club domestic league appearances and goals as of 16:30, 25 April 2026 (UTC)

Harvey Thomas Greenslade (born 8 April 2004) is an English footballer. He plays as a striker for National League South side Truro City.

== Career ==
=== Bristol Rovers ===
Greenslade first joined Bristol Rovers at the under-7s. During the 2021–22 season, Greenslade spent time on loan in the Southern Football League with Division One South club Cinderford Town and Premier Division club Tiverton Town, sandwiching a successful spell with Hellenic League Premier Division club Tuffley Rovers.

Greenslade signed his first professional contract with the club in May 2022 having been invited to train with the first-team for the last few weeks of the previous season. On 30 August 2022, Greenslade made his senior debut for Bristol Rovers from the bench in a 1–1 EFL Trophy draw with Plymouth Argyle, missing a penalty in the subsequent shootout defeat. On 6 September 2022, Greenslade joined National League South club Chippenham Town on loan until January 2023. In February 2023, he joined Truro City on a one-month loan deal. This was later extended until the end of the season. His time with the club ended with promotion. Greenslade, an unused substitute in the play-off final, had scored a penalty in the semi-final shoot-out victory. He was offered a new contract at the end of the 2022–23 season, signing a new one-year deal on 6 June.

On 12 August 2023, Greenslade returned to now National League South club Truro City on a one-month loan deal, scoring on his second debut for the club in a 3–2 defeat to Braintree Town. On 8 September, this was extended by a further month.

On 3 February 2024, Greenslade joined National League side Oxford City on loan until the end of the season.

On 1 May 2024, it was announced that Greenslade would depart the club at the end of his contract the following month.

=== Non-League ===
On 29 May 2024, Yeovil Town announced the signing of Greenslade upon the expiry of his contract with Bristol Rovers. In December 2024, he joined Weston-super-Mare on loan. He was released by Yeovil Town at the end of the 2025–26 season.

On 9 June 2026, Greenslade agreed to return to Truro City following their relegation to the National League South, signing an initial two-year deal.

== Personal life ==
Greenslade's twin sister, Lily, is also a footballer who plays for Rugby Borough having also featured previously for Bristol City and England U15, U16 and U18.

== Career statistics ==
As of end of 2025–26 season

Appearances and goals by club, season and competition
Club	Season	League			FA Cup		League Cup		Other		Total	
Club	Season	Division	Apps	Goals	Apps	Goals	Apps	Goals	Apps	Goals	Apps	Goals
Bristol Rovers	2022–23	League Two	0	0	0	0	0	0	0	0	0	0
Bristol Rovers	2022–23	League One	0	0	0	0	0	0	1 (Note: Appearance(s) in EFL Trophy)	0	1	0
Bristol Rovers	2023–24	League One	0	0	0	0	0	0	0	0	0	0
Bristol Rovers	Total		0	0	0	0	0	0	1	0	1	0
Cinderford Town (loan)	2021–22	Southern League; Division One South	3	0	0	0	—		0	0	3	0
Tuffley Rovers (loan)	2021–22	Hellenic League; Premier Division	6	3	0	0	—		0	0	6	3
Tiverton Town (loan)	2021–22	Southern League; Premier Division South	3	0	0	0	—		0	0	3	0
Chippenham Town (loan)	2022–23	National League South	10	1	5	1	—		0	0	15	2
Truro City (loan)	2022–23	Southern League; Premier Division South	13	4	—		—		1 (Note: Appearance(s) in SL Premier Division South play-offs)	0	14	4
Truro City (loan)	2023–24	National League South	19	4	1	0	—		1 (Note: Appearance(s) in FA Trophy)	0	21	4
Oxford City (loan)	2023–24	National League	16	3	—		—		0	0	16	3
Yeovil Town	2024–25	National League	27	3	1	0	—		0	0	28	3
Yeovil Town	2025–26	National League	41	2	1	1	—		4	0	46	3
Yeovil Town	Total		68	5	2	1	—		4	0	74	6
Weston-super-Mare (loan)	2024–25	National League South	4	0	—		—		—		4	0
Career total			142	20	8	2	0	0	7	0	157	22

== Honours ==
Truro City

- Southern League Premier Division South Play-Off Winners: 2022–23
