= Josh Coburn =

English footballer (born 2002)

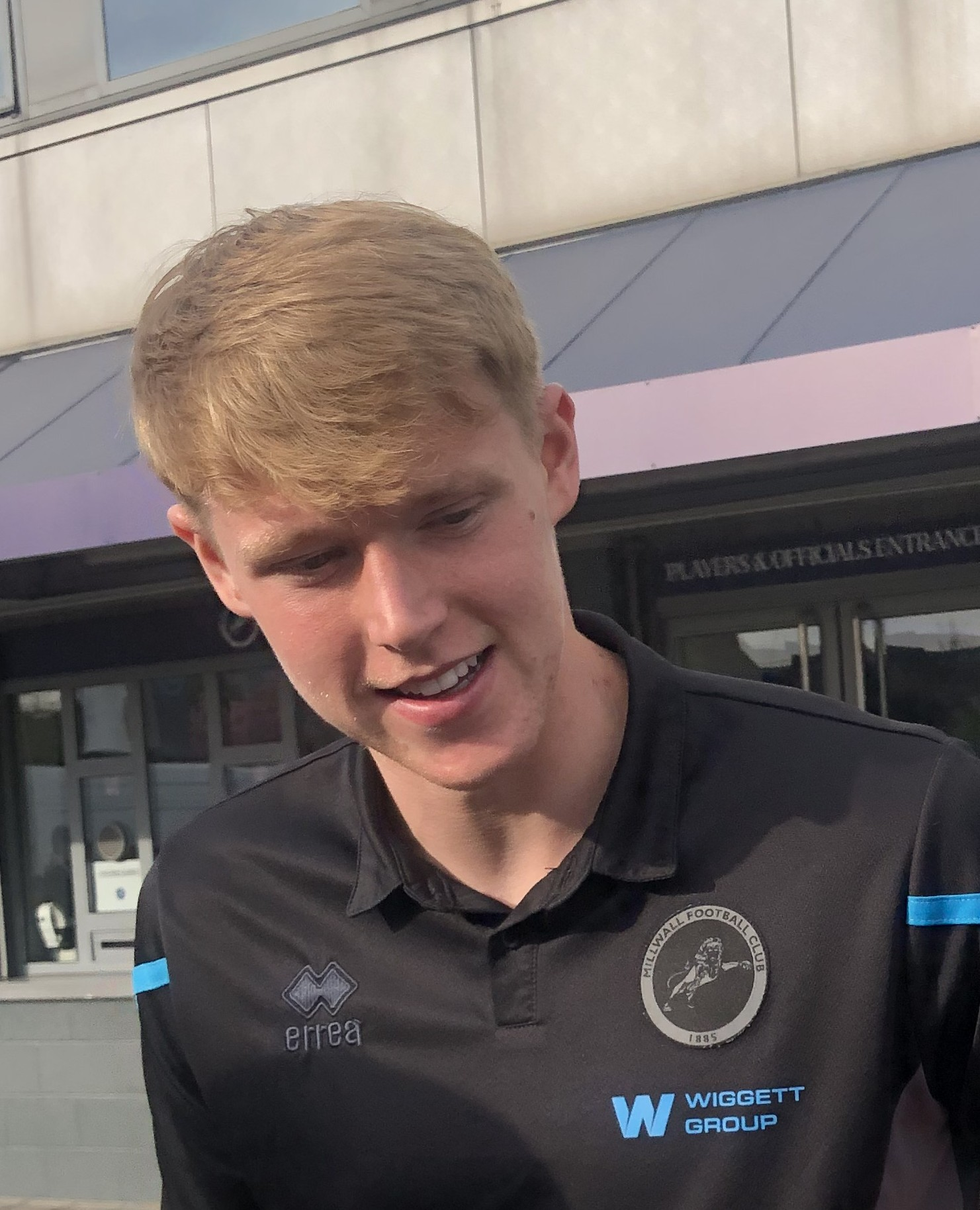
- Josh Coburn in 2025.

Personal information
- Full name: Joshua Guy Coburn
- Date of birth: 6 December 2002 (age 23)
- Place of birth: Bedale, England
- Height: 6 ft 3 in (1.91 m)
- Position: Forward

Team information
- Current team: Millwall
- Number: 19

Youth career
- –2019: Sunderland
- 2019–2021: Middlesbrough

Senior career*
Years	Team	Apps	(Gls)
2021–2025	Middlesbrough	46	(10)
2022–2023	→ Bristol Rovers (loan)	35	(10)
2024–2025	→ Millwall (loan)	20	(5)
2025–	Millwall	27	(11)
- * Club domestic league appearances and goals as of 15:13, 17 August 2026 (UTC)

Joshua Guy Coburn (born 6 December 2002) is an English professional footballer who plays as a forward for EFL Championship club Millwall.

== Early life and education ==
Coburn was born in Bedale, North Yorkshire, and attended Bedale Primary School, Crakehall Primary School and Richmond School. He returned to his primary school in November 2021 to open a new sports facility at the school, alongside local MP and former Prime Minister, Rishi Sunak.

== Career ==
=== Middlesbrough ===
After spending five years at Sunderland's academy Coburn joined Middlesbrough at under-16 level in September 2019. He signed his first professional contract with the club in January 2021, and was named on the first team bench for the first time on 13 March 2021 for a 3–0 home win over Stoke City. He made his debut for the club as a substitute in a 2–1 win over Rotherham United on 21 April 2021. Coburn scored his first goal for the club in his next game with a "brilliant headed goal" in a 3–1 league win at home to Sheffield Wednesday on 24 April 2021. He scored once in four appearances in his debut season in professional football.

On 11 August 2021, he made his first start for Middlesbrough in a 3–0 EFL Cup defeat to Blackpool. He scored his first goal of the season in a 2–0 win over Peterborough United on 16 October 2021. He scored in successive fixtures against Luton Town and West Bromwich Albion in November 2021, the former coinciding with his full league debut. In January 2022, he signed a new contract with the club until 2025, with the option of a further year.

On 1 March 2022, he scored the winning goal in extra time in an FA Cup match against Tottenham Hotspur to take Middlesbrough through to the quarter-finals of the competition.

==== Bristol Rovers (loan) ====
On 1 September 2022, Coburn joined EFL League One club Bristol Rovers on loan for the 2022–23 season. Having suffered an injury on the opening day of the season, Coburn would stay with his parent club in the short-term to work on the rehab from this knee injury. On 4 October, Coburn made his debut for the club when he came on as a half-time substitute in a 2–0 EFL Trophy victory over Crystal Palace U21. Coburn made his league debut four days later, scoring the winner in a 2–1 victory over Cambridge United, Rovers' first league win for eight weeks. Coburn impressed during his first ten league appearances for the club, scoring five goals, with manager Joey Barton tipping him to go on to play for England. In December 2022, amid talk of a potential recall, Middlesbrough Head of Football Kieran Scott reiterated the plan was to allow Coburn to stay with Rovers until the end of the season as originally planned. Despite going through a goal drought of over two months, he retained the faith of Middlesbrough manager Michael Carrick who challenged him to force himself back into the first-team regularly. On 2 May 2023, he ended his goal drought in the penultimate game of the season in a 2–1 defeat to Shrewsbury Town, his first goal since 7 January and his tenth of the season. At the end of the season, he received the club's Young Player of the Year award and their goal of the season award for his goal in October against Sheffield Wednesday.

=== Millwall ===
On 30 August 2024, Coburn joined fellow Championship side Millwall on a season-long loan deal, scoring on his debut. In just his second appearance for the club, he suffered a calf injury that manager Neil Harris estimated would rule him out for a period of six to eight weeks.

On 26 June 2025, Millwall completed the permanent signing of Coburn from Middlesbrough for an undisclosed club-record fee of up to £5 million. He was named EFL Championship Player of the Month for March 2026 after three goals helped the Lions in their push for automatic promotion.

== Career statistics ==
As of 15 August 2026

Appearances and goals by club, season and competition
Club	Season	League			FA Cup		League Cup		Other		Total	
Club	Season	Division	Apps	Goals	Apps	Goals	Apps	Goals	Apps	Goals	Apps	Goals
Middlesbrough	2020–21	Championship	4	1	0	0	0	0	—		4	1
Middlesbrough	2021–22	Championship	18	4	3	1	1	0	—		22	5
Middlesbrough	2022–23	Championship	1	0	0	0	0	0	—		1	0
Middlesbrough	2023–24	Championship	21	5	1	0	3	0	—		25	5
Middlesbrough	2024–25	Championship	2	0	0	0	2	1	—		4	1
Middlesbrough	Total		46	10	4	1	6	1	—		56	12
Bristol Rovers (loan)	2022–23	League One	35	10	1	0	0	0	4 (Note: Appearances in EFL Trophy)	0	40	10
Millwall (loan)	2024–25	Championship	20	5	1	0	0	0	—		21	5
Millwall	2025–26	Championship	26	9	1	1	2	0	2 (Note: Appearances in EFL Championship play-offs)	0	31	10
Millwall	2026–27	Championship	1	2	0	0	1	0	0	0	2	2
Millwall	Total		27	11	1	1	3	0	2	0	33	12
Career total			128	36	7	2	9	1	6	0	150	39

== Honours ==
Individual

- Bristol Rovers Young Player of the Year: 2022–23
- EFL Championship Player of the Month: March 2026
