= Aaron Collins (footballer) =

Welsh footballer (born 1997)

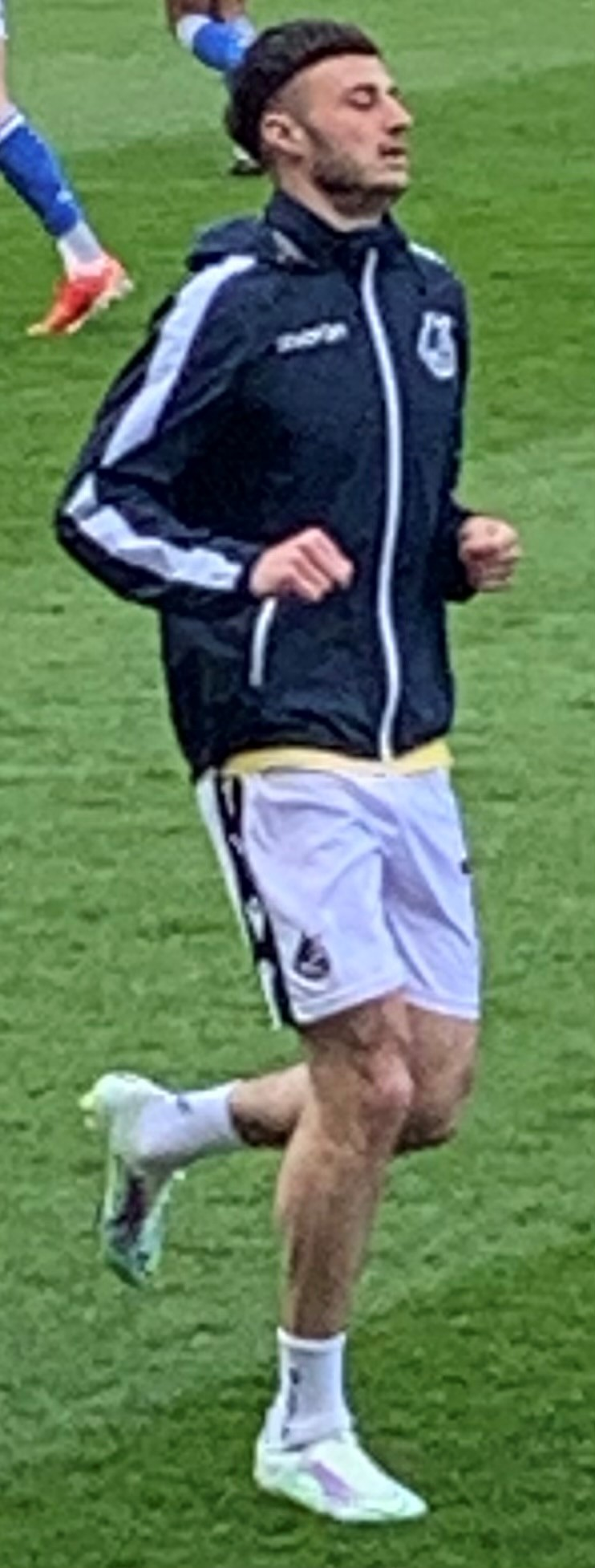
- Collins at Bristol Rovers in 2022

Personal information
- Full name: Aaron Graham John Collins
- Date of birth: 27 May 1997 (age 29)
- Place of birth: Newport, Wales
- Height: 1.78 m (5 ft 10 in)
- Positions: Forward; winger

Team information
- Current team: Milton Keynes Dons
- Number: 10

Youth career
- –2014: Newport County

Senior career*
Years	Team	Apps	(Gls)
2014–2016	Newport County	20	(2)
2015	→ Merthyr Town (loan)	1	(0)
2016–2019	Wolverhampton Wanderers	0	(0)
2016–2017	→ Notts County (loan)	18	(2)
2017	→ Tranmere Rovers (loan)	2	(1)
2017	→ Maidstone United (loan)	4	(1)
2018	→ Newport County (loan)	10	(0)
2018–2019	→ Colchester United (loan)	7	(1)
2019	Morecambe	15	(8)
2019–2021	Forest Green Rovers	72	(14)
2021–2024	Bristol Rovers	118	(35)
2024–2025	Bolton Wanderers	64	(20)
2025–	Milton Keynes Dons	42	(19)

International career^{‡}
2015	Wales U19	1	(0)
2026–	Wales	1	(0)
- * Club domestic league appearances and goals as of 19:54, 31 October 2026 (UTC) ‡ National team caps and goals as of 21:30, 17 November 2026 (UTC)

Aaron Graham John Collins (born 27 May 1997) is a Welsh professional footballer who plays as a forward or winger for EFL League One club Milton Keynes Dons and the Wales national team.

== Club career ==
=== Newport County ===
Collins was a part of the Bristol Rovers academy before joining the Newport County academy. In 2014, he nearly left the Newport academy after not being offered a scholarship. Unable to afford the costs of travelling each day, Collins took a job in McDonald's in Malpas. However, academy coach Michael Flynn later intervened and Collins was offered his first professional contract with the club soon after. Then Newport manager Jimmy Dack described Collins as "a young George Boyd".

Collins was handed his first place in a matchday squad as an unused substitute for Newport aged 17 in a League Two match versus Shrewsbury Town on 20 September 2014. Three days later, Collins made his senior debut in a Football League Trophy first-round match against Swindon Town as an 11th minute replacement for Michael Flynn. However, his debut lasted just 34 minutes when the ball hit him in the face and he too had to be substituted. Swindon won the game 2–1.

In January 2015, Collins joined Merthyr Town on loan, making his only appearance as a substitute in a 2–1 win over Clevedon Town. Collins made his Football League debut on 18 April as a second-half substitute in a League Two match versus Dagenham & Redbridge. He scored his first competitive goal on 15 August in a league match versus Stevenage during a 2–2 draw. In the final week of the transfer window in August 2015, Championship side Burnley submitted two bids for Collins, the last being £65,000 plus potential future add-ons, both of which were rejected by Newport.

=== Wolverhampton Wanderers ===
On 22 January 2016, Collins signed for Wolverhampton Wanderers on a two-and-a-half-year contract for an undisclosed fee. On 31 August, Collins joined Notts County on loan until 7 January 2017. He scored a last minute equaliser on his debut against Grimsby Town to tie the game at 2–2. On 23 March, Collins joined Tranmere Rovers on loan for the remainder of the 2016–17 season. He made his debut for the club as a substitute during a 9–0 victory over Solihull Moors, scoring his side's final goal of the game.

On 29 November 2017, Collins joined Maidstone United on a one-month loan deal and on 3 January 2018, he re-joined Newport on loan for the remainder of the 2017–18 season. On 7 June, Collins joined Colchester United on loan for the 2018–19 season. He made his competitive debut on 4 August in Colchester's 0–0 draw with Notts County. His loan was terminated by mutual consent on 2 January 2019 after scoring one goal in eleven appearances for the club. In January, Collins's contract with Wolverhampton was terminated by mutual consent.

=== Morecambe ===
The following month on 9 February 2019, he signed for Morecambe until the end of the 2018–19 season. Collins scored eight goals in 15 matches for Morecambe.

=== Forest Green Rovers ===
Collins joined Forest Green Rovers on a two-year deal in June 2019. Collins was offered a new contract by the club at the end of the 2020–21 season.

=== Bristol Rovers ===
On 25 June 2021, Collins agreed to join Bristol Rovers on a two-year deal following the expiration of his contract with Forest Green. His debut came on 14 August in a 2–0 home defeat to Stevenage. On 16 November, Collins scored his first goal for the club with an incredible strike from 25 yards to make it 3–3 in the 115th minute of an FA Cup first round replay with Oxford United. It took until 7 December for Collins to open his league account for the club, a deflected strike in a 2–1 home defeat to Port Vale. On 22 February 2022, he scored for the third match in a row to score his tenth goal of the season in all competitions, the second in a 2–0 win over Leyton Orient. On 12 March, Collins scored a double as Rovers defeated Harrogate Town 3–0, taking his tally for the season to thirteen in all competitions, the best goalscoring season of his career. On 30 April 2022, Collins scored a first career hat-trick, including a 95th-minute winner, as Rovers came from 3–1 down at Rochdale to get a vital 4–3 win to take Rovers' automatic promotion hopes to the last day of the season. On 7 May 2022, Collins scored a double as Rovers thrashed bottom of the table Scunthorpe United 7–0, this result achieving the five-goal swing Rovers needed to overtake Northampton Town to claim the final automatic promotion spot on the final day of the season on a goals scored basis.

On 29 July 2022, the eve of the beginning of the 2022–23 season, Collins signed a new two-year contract extension to his existing deal, keeping him at the club until 2025. Collins marked his new contract by scoring the equaliser the following day as Rovers fell to a late 2–1 opening day defeat to Collins's former club and fellow promoted side Forest Green Rovers. Collins was nominated for the August EFL League One Player of the Month award after scoring three goals and assisting an additional two in five matches across the month. Three goals and three assists saw Collins again nominated for both the league's and PFA Fans' Player of the Month award for October, winning the former. The day after winning the award, Collins reached the ten goal mark for the season with his side's second goal in a 2–2 draw with Fleetwood Town. Following a 2–1 victory over Cheltenham Town on 1 January 2023, in which a goal and assist for Collins took his combined goals and assists total to 23 in 25 matches, manager Barton valued him at £5 million for the upcoming January transfer window. In April 2023, he was named on a three-man shortlist for the League One Player of the Season, facing competition from Jonson Clarke-Harris and Barry Bannan. At the EFL Awards Ceremony on 23 April, he took home the League One Player of the Season award, also being named in the League One team of the season. He followed this up with winning the Bristol Rovers Player of the Year award at the end of season awards, as well as the club's top goalscorer award.

On 27 January 2024, Collins was omitted from the matchday squad as Rovers faced Oxford United with rumours surrounding his future at the club, amid reported interest from other clubs. Manager Matt Taylor confirmed that it was the player's decision to not be selected.

=== Bolton Wanderers ===
On 1 February 2024, Collins signed for League One promotion hopefuls Bolton Wanderers for an undisclosed fee on a three-and-a-half-year deal. Having had an initial bid reported to be in the region of £600,000 rejected, the agreed fee was reported as £750,000. Two days after joining the club, he made his debut from the bench in a 1–1 draw with Barnsley. Having been brought on in the sixty-third minute, he produced a sublime cross for Zac Ashworth to equalise with just his second touch of the ball, and almost won it for his new side late on. On 1 April 2024, Collins scored a second career hat-trick in a 5–2 victory over Reading. On 25 September 2024, Collins scored a consolation goal in a 5–1 EFL Cup third round away defeat to Arsenal.

On 12 April 2025, Collins scored his 100th professional career goal, a consolation in a 4–1 defeat to Barnsley. A month later, he was voted as the Bolton Wanderers Player of the Year, having scored 19 total goals that season.

=== Milton Keynes Dons ===
On 19 June 2025, Collins signed for League Two side Milton Keynes Dons for an undisclosed fee rumoured to be in the region of £800,000 - a new record signing for the club. He made his debut on 2 August 2025, the opening day of the 2025–26 season, in a 0–0 home draw with Oldham Athletic, but suffered a broken arm following a collision during the game.

After five weeks out, Collins returned from injury on 13 September 2025 as a 63rd-minute substitute in a 1–1 draw away to Chesterfield. On 16 September 2025 he scored his first goal for the club in a 1–5 EFL Trophy group stage defeat at home to West Ham United U21. Two days after the game, he suffered another injury set-back following a hamstring injury sustained during a training session. Collins returned from injury on 22 November 2025 in a 2–2 draw away to Tranmere Rovers.

At the conclusion of the season, despite long spells out injured, Collins made 29 league appearances and scored 6 goals across a campaign in which the club achieved a second-placed promotion to League One.

On 31 October 2026, Collins scored a club record-equalling four goals in a 6–1 home league win over Doncaster Rovers. This took his league total to eight goals for the month, in addition to assisting two, subsequently being named EFL League One Player of the Month for October 2026.

== International career ==
In April 2015, Collins was named in the Wales Under 19 squad for the match versus Germany on 18 April 2015 and was subsequently named in the starting line-up.

On 10 November 2026, he was called up to the Wales national team for the first time to replace an injured Kieffer Moore ahead of their Nations League fixtures against Norway and Portugal, and went on to make his debut as a 63rd-minute substitute against the latter on 17 November 2026, with Wales losing the game 2–3.

== Personal life ==
Aaron is the elder brother of professional footballer Lewis Collins. The brothers were on opposing sides for the first time on 18 May 2021 for the League Two play off first leg match at Rodney Parade in their home city of Newport, Wales. Aaron as a striker for Forest Green Rovers and Lewis as a striker for Newport County. Newport won the match 2–0 with Lewis scoring the second goal. Aaron scored in the second leg, a 4–3 win for Forest Green.

== Career statistics ==
=== Club ===
As of match played 31 October 2026

Appearances and goals by club, season and competition
Club	Season	League			FA Cup		League Cup		Other		Total	
Club	Season	Division	Apps	Goals	Apps	Goals	Apps	Goals	Apps	Goals	Apps	Goals
Newport County	2014–15	League Two	2	0	0	0	0	0	1	0	3	0
Newport County	2015–16	League Two	18	2	2	0	1	0	1	1	22	3
Newport County	total		20	2	2	0	1	0	2	1	25	3
Merthyr Town (loan)	2014–15	SL Division One South	1	0	0	0	0	0	0	0	1	0
Wolverhampton Wanderers	2015–16	Championship	0	0	0	0	0	0	0	0	0	0
Wolverhampton Wanderers	2016–17	Championship	0	0	0	0	0	0	0	0	0	0
Wolverhampton Wanderers	2017–18	Championship	0	0	0	0	0	0	0	0	0	0
Wolverhampton Wanderers	2018–19	Premier League	0	0	0	0	0	0	0	0	0	0
Wolverhampton Wanderers	Total		0	0	0	0	0	0	0	0	0	0
Wolverhampton Wanderers U23	2016–17	—			—		—		2 (Note: Appearance(s) in EFL Trophy)	0	2	0
Notts County (loan)	2016–17	League Two	18	2	4	1	0	0	0	0	22	3
Tranmere Rovers (loan)	2016–17	National League	2	1	0	0	—		0	0	2	1
Maidstone United (loan)	2017–18	National League	4	1	1	0	—		1	0	6	1
Newport County (loan)	2017–18	League Two	10	0	0	0	0	0	0	0	10	0
Colchester United (loan)	2018–19	League Two	7	0	0	0	1	0	3	1	11	1
Morecambe	2018–19	League Two	15	8	0	0	0	0	0	0	15	8
Forest Green Rovers	2019–20	League Two	28	4	3	1	0	0	2	0	33	5
Forest Green Rovers	2020–21	League Two	44	10	1	0	1	0	4 (Note: Two appearances in EFL Trophy and two appearances; one goal in EFL League Two play-offs)	1	50	11
Forest Green Rovers	Total		72	14	4	1	1	0	6	1	83	16
Bristol Rovers	2021–22	League Two	45	16	3	2	0	0	2	0	50	18
Bristol Rovers	2022–23	League One	46	16	2	0	1	0	4	0	53	16
Bristol Rovers	2023–24	League One	27	3	4	1	1	0	4	1	36	5
Bristol Rovers	Total		118	35	9	3	2	0	10	1	139	39
Bolton Wanderers	2023–24	League One	19	8	—		—		3 (Note: Three appearances and one goal in League One play-offs)	1	22	9
Bolton Wanderers	2024–25	League One	45	12	1	0	3	1	6	6	55	19
Bolton Wanderers	Total		64	20	1	0	3	1	9	7	77	28
Milton Keynes Dons	2025–26	League Two	29	6	2	1	0	0	1	1	32	8
Milton Keynes Dons	2026–27	League One	13	13	0	0	1	0	1	3	15	16
Milton Keynes Dons	Total		42	19	2	1	1	0	2	4	47	24
Career total			373	102	22	7	8	1	35	15	436	122

=== International ===
As of match played 17 November 2026

Appearances and goals by national team and year
National team	Year	Apps	Goals
Wales	2026	1	0
Total		1	0

== Honours ==
Bristol Rovers

- EFL League Two third-place promotion: 2021–22

Milton Keynes Dons

- EFL League Two runner-up: 2025–26

Individual

- EFL League One Player of the Month: October 2022, October 2026
- EFL League One Player of the Season: 2022–23
- Bristol Rovers Player of the Year: 2022–23
- EFL League One Team of the Season: 2022–23
- Bolton Wanderers Player of the Year: 2024–25
