= Bristol Rovers F.C. Player of the Year =

The Bristol Rovers Player of the Year award has been presented annually to the player voted the best in the preceding season by the fans of Bristol Rovers Football Club. The winning player has been awarded a trophy by the Bristol Rovers Supporters club every year since 1983, and in 2018 the Football Club also began naming their own player of the year at an end-of-season awards dinner.

== Bristol Rovers Supporters' Club player of the year ==
The first trophy was presented in 1983, but due to there being little space to engrave the names of any more winners the supporters' club commissioned a new trophy in 2018, which was named the Geoff Dunford Memorial Trophy in honour of the former football club chairman who had died the previous year.

Season	Player	Nation	Position	Age	Notes	Refs
1982–83	Aidan McCaffery	England	Defender	24		
1983–84	Brian Williams	England	Midfielder	27		
1984–85	Tim Parkin	England	Defender	26		
1985–86	Tim Parkin	England	Defender	27	First multiple winner	
1986–87	Geoff Twentyman	England	Defender	27		
1987–88	Gary Penrice	England	Forward	23		
1988–89	Nigel Martyn	England	Goalkeeper	21	Youngest ever winner	
1989–90	Ian Holloway	England	Midfielder	26		
1990–91	Carl Saunders	England	Forward	25		
1991–92	Carl Saunders	England	Forward	26		
1992–93	Gary Waddock	Republic of Ireland	Midfielder	30		
1993–94	Worrell Sterling	England	Midfielder	28		
1994–95	Andy Tillson	England	Defender	28		
1995–96	Marcus Stewart	England	Forward	22		
1996–97	Andy Collett	England	Goalkeeper	22		
1997–98	Barry Hayles	Jamaica	Forward	25		
1998–99	Trevor Challis	England	Defender	22		
1999–2000	Andy Thomson	England	Defender	25		
2000–01	Steve Foster	England	Defender	25		
2001–02	Scott Howie	Scotland	Goalkeeper	29	First non-English-born winner	
2002–03	Vitālijs Astafjevs	Latvia	Midfielder	31	First non-UK-born winner	
2003–04	Kevin Miller	England	Goalkeeper	34	Oldest ever winner	
2004–05	James Hunt	England	Midfielder	27		
2005–06	Richard Walker	England	Forward	27		
2006–07	Steve Phillips	England	Goalkeeper	28		
2007–08	Stuart Campbell	Scotland	Midfielder	29		
2008–09	Rickie Lambert	England	Forward	25		
2009–10	Stuart Campbell	Scotland	Midfielder	31		
2010–11	Stuart Campbell	Scotland	Midfielder	32	First three-time winner	
2011–12	Danny Woodards	England	Defender	27		
2012–13	Michael Smith	Northern Ireland	Defender	23		
2013–14	Michael Smith	Northern Ireland	Defender	24		
2014–15	Tom Parkes	England	Defender	22		
2015–16	Matty Taylor	England	Forward	25		
2016–17	Ollie Clarke	England	Midfielder	24		
2017–18	Ellis Harrison	Wales	Forward	23		
2018–19	James Clarke	England	Defender	28		
2024–25	Connor Taylor	England	Defender	22		
2025–26	Alfie Kilgour	England	Defender	27		

Notes:

- Footballing nationality is defined as the national team the player has represented at senior or youth level, or the player's country of birth where they have never played for a national team.
- Age shown is the players age at the beginning of the season during which they won the player of the year award.
- All winners from 1983 to 2018 are from Byrne & Jay (2018).

=== Players who have won more than once ===
Four players have won the award on more than one occasion. The record for most wins belongs to Stuart Campbell, who was player of the year in 2008, 2010 and 2011, while three other players have won the award twice.

Player	Nationality	Number of wins
Stuart Campbell	Scotland	3
Tim Parkin	England	2
Carl Saunders	England	2
Michael Smith	Northern Ireland	2

=== Number of wins by nationality ===
Nation	Number of wins
England	30
Scotland	4
Northern Ireland	2
Jamaica; Latvia; Republic of Ireland; Wales	1

=== Number of wins by position ===
Position	Number of wins
Goalkeeper	6
Defender	14
Midfielder	10
Forward	9

== Bristol Rovers Football Club Player of the Year ==
Bristol Rovers Football Club held their inaugural end of season awards dinner in 2018, where they presented their own player of the year award. This went to midfielder Liam Sercombe.

Season	Player	Nation	Position	Age	Notes	Refs
2017–18	Liam Sercombe	England	Midfielder	27		
2018–19	Ollie Clarke	England	Midfielder	26		
2019–20	Not awarded					
2020–21	Not awarded					
2021–22	James Belshaw	England	Goalkeeper	30		
2022–23	Aaron Collins	Wales	Forward	25	Also League One Player of the Year and Club's Golden Boot winner	
2023–24	Antony Evans	England	Midfielder	24		
2024–25	Not awarded					
2025–26	Fabrizio Cavegn	Switzerland	Forward	22		

== Comparison of Supporters' Club and Football Club winners ==
Season	Supporters' Club winner	Football Club winner
2017–18	(Wales) Ellis Harrison	(England) Liam Sercombe
2018–19	(England) James Clarke	(England) Ollie Clarke
2021–22		(England) James Belshaw
2022–23		(Wales) Aaron Collins
2023–24		(England) Antony Evans
2024–25	(England) Connor Taylor	Not awarded
2025–26	(England) Alfie Kilgour	(Switzerland) Fabrizio Cavegn

== Bibliography ==
- Byrne, Stephen; Jay, Mike (2018). Bristol Rovers Players' Who's Who. Bristol: Mike Jay.
