= James Connolly (footballer) =

Welsh footballer (born 2001)

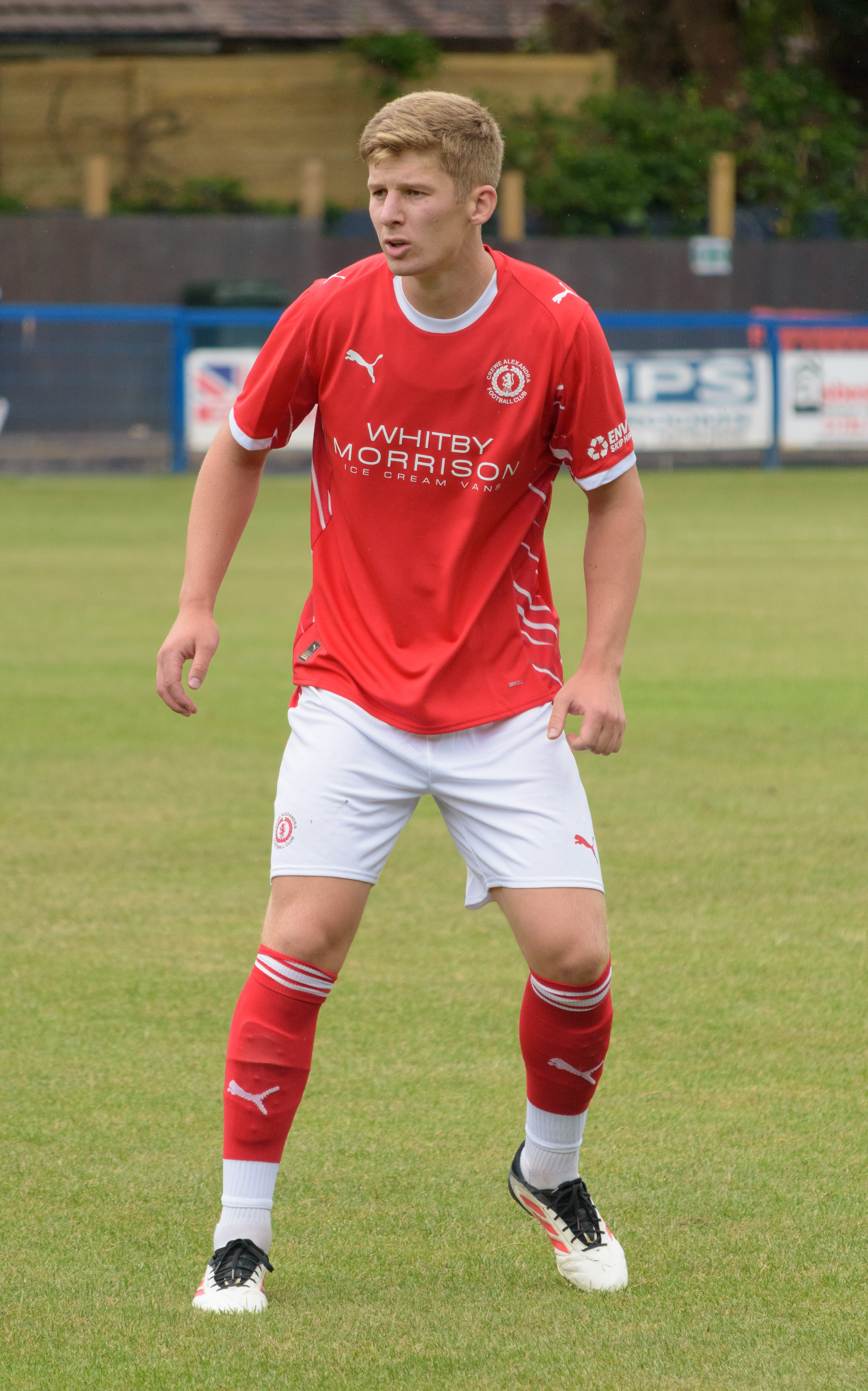
- Connolly playing for Crewe Alexandra in 2025

Personal information
- Full name: James Alfred Connolly
- Date of birth: 2 November 2001 (age 25)
- Position: Central defender

Team information
- Current team: Walsall
- Number: 4

Youth career
- Blackburn Rovers
- 2020–2021: Cardiff City

Senior career*
Years	Team	Apps	(Gls)
2021–2022	Cardiff City	0	(0)
2022	→ Bristol Rovers (loan)	24	(1)
2022–2024	Bristol Rovers	41	(1)
2023–2024	→ Morecambe (loan)	13	(2)
2024–2026	Crewe Alexandra	61	(3)
2026–	Walsall	13	(2)

International career^{‡}
2022	Wales U21	1	(0)
- * Club domestic league appearances and goals as of 14:34, 22 November 2026 (UTC) ‡ National team caps and goals as of 11:24, 15 June 2022

James Alfred Connolly (born 2 November 2001) is a Welsh professional footballer who plays as a central defender for EFL League Two club Walsall. He is a former Wales under-21 international.

== Club career ==
=== Early career ===
Connolly began his career with Blackburn Rovers, signing a two-year scholarship contract with the club in June 2018. Despite missing the majority of the 2019–20 season through an injury sustained in October 2019, Connolly had his scholarship extended by a further year being released by the club at the end of the following season. In June 2021, Connolly signed with Cardiff City. Connolly was retained by the club ahead of the 2022–23 season.

=== Bristol Rovers ===
On 8 January 2022, Connolly joined League Two side Bristol Rovers on loan for the remainder of the 2021–22 season. He made his senior debut later that day in a 2–1 FA Cup third round defeat to Peterborough United, and his league debut came on 22 January 2022. Connolly formed a solid defensive partnership with fellow Championship loanee Connor Taylor, being praised for his composure on the ball and his ability to adapt to the physical demands of League Two football. Connolly scored a first senior goal in a vital match against promotion rivals Port Vale, turning home an Antony Evans cross to give Rovers the lead having fallen behind early on, Rovers going on to win 3–1. Connolly's first season in professional football ended in success as Rovers were promoted on the final day of the season, a 7–0 victory moving Bristol Rovers into third place, beating Northampton Town to automatic promotion on goals scored.

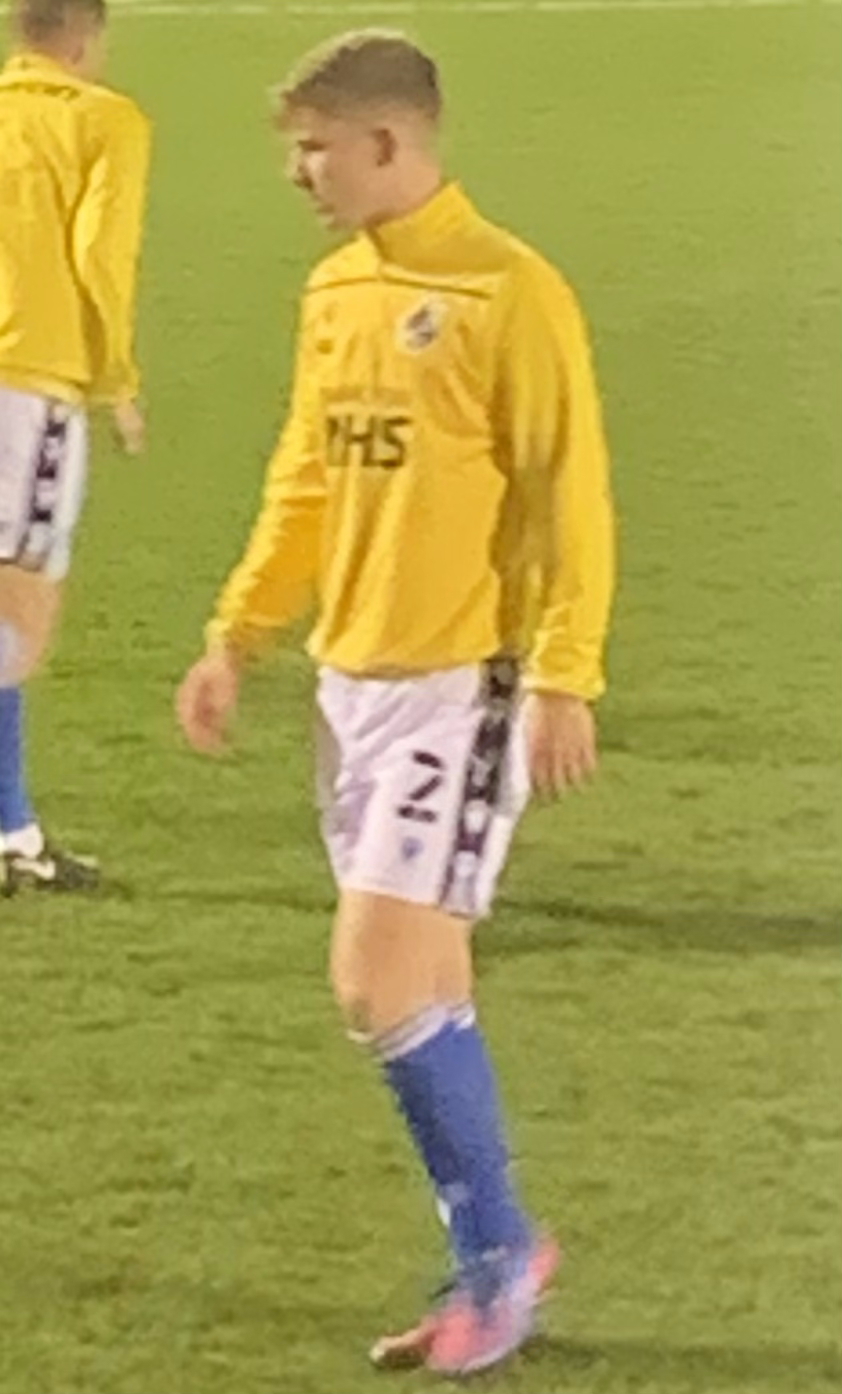
Connolly at Bristol Rovers in 2022.

He re-joined Bristol Rovers on a permanent deal, transferring for an undisclosed sum, in June 2022, signing a three-year contract. On 6 August 2022, Connolly scored his first goal since returning to the club on a permanent basis with the second in a 4–0 thrashing of Burton Albion. On 27 August 2022, it was revealed that Connolly had suffered a stress fracture in his back that would see him out of action for a 'long period'. On 29 October, Connolly made his return to first-team football as a substitute in a 4–2 defeat at Derby County.

On 31 August 2023, Connolly joined League Two club Morecambe on loan until the end of the 2023–24 season. He was recalled by his parent club on 3 January 2024.

=== Crewe Alexandra ===
On 1 August 2024, Connolly joined League Two side Crewe Alexandra on a two-year deal. He made his debut in the side's league 1–0 defeat away at Barrow. In January 2025, Connolly suffered a torn hamstring in Crewe's 4–1 win over Bromley, ruling him out of the first team for a few weeks. He scored his first Crewe goal on 22 November 2025, heading home the final goal in a 3–3 League Two draw against Chesterfield at Gresty Road. In June 2026, he turned down a new contract at Crewe.

=== Walsall ===
On 1 July 2026, Connolly joined fellow League Two club Walsall on a two-year deal with the option for a further year.

== International career ==
In May 2022, Connolly was called up to the Wales U21 team for the first time for the final 2023 U21 European Championship qualifiers against the Netherlands and Gibraltar. Connolly made his debut in the latter of these matches as Wales won 2–0.

== Career statistics ==
As of match played 21 November 2026

Appearances and goals by club, season and competition
Club	Season	League			FA Cup		League Cup		Other		Total	
Club	Season	Division	Apps	Goals	Apps	Goals	Apps	Goals	Apps	Goals	Apps	Goals
Cardiff City	2021–22	Championship	0	0	0	0	0	0	0	0	0	0
Bristol Rovers (loan)	2021–22	League Two	24	1	1	0	0	0	0	0	25	1
Bristol Rovers	2022–23	League One	30	1	2	0	1	0	3 (Note: Appearance(s) in the EFL Trophy.)	1	36	2
Bristol Rovers	2023–24	League One	11	0	0	0	1	0	0	0	12	0
Bristol Rovers	Total		41	1	2	0	2	0	3	1	48	2
Morecambe (loan)	2023–24	League Two	13	2	1	0	0	0	3	0	17	2
Crewe Alexandra	2024–25	League Two	21	0	1	0	1	0	3	0	26	0
Crewe Alexandra	2025–26	League Two	40	3	1	0	1	0	2	0	44	3
Crewe Alexandra	Total		61	3	2	0	2	0	5	0	70	3
Walsall	2026–27	League Two	13	2	0	0	2	0	1	0	16	2
Career total			152	9	6	0	6	0	12	1	176	10

== Honours ==
Bristol Rovers

- League Two promotion: 2021–22
