= James Belshaw =

English footballer (born 1990)

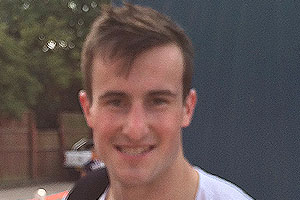
- Belshaw in 2014

Personal information
- Full name: James Michael Belshaw
- Date of birth: 12 October 1990 (age 36)
- Place of birth: Nottingham, England
- Height: 6 ft 3 in (1.91 m)
- Position: Goalkeeper

Team information
- Current team: Notts County
- Number: 1

Youth career
- 1996–2005: Notts County
- 2006–2009: Heanor Town
- 2009: Walsall

College career
Years	Team	Apps	(Gls)
2009–2012	Duke Blue Devils	78	(0)

Senior career*
Years	Team	Apps	(Gls)
2013–2014	Nuneaton Borough	31	(0)
2014–2017	Tamworth	113	(0)
2017–2021	Harrogate Town	161	(0)
2021–2024	Bristol Rovers	89	(0)
2023	→ Forest Green Rovers (loan)	10	(0)
2023–2024	→ Harrogate Town (loan)	6	(0)
2024–2026	Harrogate Town	87	(0)
2026–	Notts County	11	(0)
- * Club domestic league appearances and goals as of 09:56, 14 January 2026 (UTC)

James Michael Belshaw (born 12 October 1990) is an English professional footballer who plays as a goalkeeper for EFL League One club Notts County.

== Career ==
=== Youth and college ===
Belshaw attended The Becket School in West Bridgford, where he captained the team to the Notts Schools Cup title in 2009. He also had spells with Notts County, Heanor Town and Walsall.

In 2009, Belshaw rejected a one-year professional contract with Walsall, and instead moved to the United States to play college soccer at Duke University. He made 78 appearances for the Blue Devils between 2009 and 2012. During his time at Duke, Belshaw won accolades such as 2012 NSCAA All-America third team, was a two-time All-ACC first team selection, a three-time All-ACC choice, earning second team honors in 2010 and earned NSCAA All-South Region honors all four seasons.

=== Return to England ===
On 22 January 2013, Belshaw was selected 49th overall in the 2013 MLS Supplemental Draft by Chicago Fire. Belshaw was offered a contract by Chicago, but as a backup goalkeeper, so instead opted to search for first-team football back in his native England.

In April 2013, Belshaw had trials with his former team Walsall, as well as Everton, Notts County and Coventry City.

On 31 July 2013, Belshaw signed with National League club Nuneaton Borough. Following one season with Nuneaton, Belshaw moved to National League North side Tamworth where he played for three seasons.

=== Harrogate Town ===
In 2017, Belshaw moved to Harrogate Town on a two-year contract, where he remained first choice goalkeeper for the club. He was part of the Harrogate team that won promotion to the National League for the first time in the club's history after defeating Brackley Town in the 2018 National League North play-off final. After signing a deal to keep him at the club until 2023 in January 2020, Belshaw helped guide them to the Football League for the first time via the play-offs in 2020.

=== Bristol Rovers ===
On 23 July 2021, Belshaw joined recently relegated fellow League Two side Bristol Rovers for an undisclosed fee on a two-year deal. Belshaw's debut came for the club came on 10 August, in a 2–0 EFL Cup defeat to Cheltenham Town. Having been a key part of Rovers' rise up the table from eighteenth on New Years Day to a promotion battle, keeping ten clean sheets in his previous fifteen appearances and becoming a firm fan favourite, Belshaw signed a new deal with the club in March 2022, keeping him at the club until June 2024. In May 2022, Belshaw was awarded the PFA Community Champion award by the Bristol Rovers Community Trust for his work with the Community Trust across the course of the season including becoming the health ambassador and supporting mental health schemes. With the club having achieved promotion on the final day of the season in dramatic fashion, a 7–0 victory taking the club into the final automatic promotion spot at Northampton Town's expense on goals scored, Belshaw was awarded the Bristol Rovers Player of the Year Award at the end of season awards evening having kept seventeen clean sheets across the season.

Following a 4–3 home defeat to Exeter City in December 2022, manager Joey Barton attributed the blame for all four goals at the door of Belshaw. During the January transfer window, Rovers signed Ellery Balcombe on loan from Brentford, a clause in the loan deal stating that he had to start the first three matches of his spell in order to avoid a fee. Following this three game spell, Balcombe was again selected for a home match against Ipswich Town, in which he kept a first clean sheet for the club, with Belshaw omitted from the first-team squad. Barton revealed prior to the match that with the team having been released, Belshaw's attitude in training had dropped significantly with a warning that he may never play for the club again unless things were to change. His response to the situation however was sufficient for the manager and he returned to consideration. He returned to the starting line-up the following week, keeping a clean sheet in a 3–0 victory away at Oxford United.

The signings of goalkeepers Matthew Cox and Matthew Hall in July 2023 cast doubt upon the long-term future of Belshaw at the football club, the previous season's dispute with Barton being brought once again to the limelight. Having failed to make the previous two matchday squads, it was revealed that both he and his agent had asked for transfers away from the club and he would therefore no longer be considered for selection and available for transfer. With a move having failed to materialise before the transfer deadline, he made his first-team return in a 4–1 EFL Trophy victory over Cheltenham Town.

On 30 September 2023, he joined League Two club Forest Green Rovers on a seven-day emergency loan. He was awarded the Player of the Month award for October 2023. He announced on 14 December 2023 that he was leaving the club upon the expiration of what was referred to by the club as "the longest emergency loan ever". On 15 December 2023, he returned to former club Harrogate Town on a seven-day emergency loan deal.

=== Return to Harrogate Town ===
On 11 January 2024, Belshaw's permanent return to Harrogate Town was confirmed, joining for an undisclosed fee. He was nominated for the EFL League Two Player of the Month award for March 2024 having kept three clean sheets in six matches.

In March 2025, the club triggered an extension clause in Belshaw's contract to keep him at the club for the upcoming season.

=== Notts County ===
On 13 January 2026, Belshaw signed for boyhood club Notts County for an undisclosed fee, signing an 18-month deal.

== Personal life ==
Belshaw has supported Notts County since childhood.

Belshaw is "good friends" with professional basketball player Mason Plumlee, who plays for NBA side Charlotte Hornets.

Belshaw holds two degrees from Duke University in both History and Business Markets and Management.

== Career statistics ==
As of 13 January 2026

Appearances and goals by club, season and competition
Club	Season	League			FA Cup		League Cup		Other		Total	
Club	Season	Division	Apps	Goals	Apps	Goals	Apps	Goals	Apps	Goals	Apps	Goals
Harrogate Town	2017–18	National League North	41	0	4	0	—		6 (Note: 4 appearances in FA Trophy, two appearances in National League North play-offs)	0	51	0
Harrogate Town	2018–19	National League	45	0	2	0	—		4 (Note: 3 appearances in FA Trophy, one appearance in National League play-offs)	0	51	0
Harrogate Town	2019–20	National League	37	0	2	0	—		2 (Note: Appearance(s) in National League play-offs)	0	41	0
Harrogate Town	2020–21	League Two	38	0	1	0	0	0	1 (Note: Appearance(s) in EFL Trophy)	0	40	0
Bristol Rovers	2021–22	League Two	42	0	4	0	1	0	0	0	47	0
Bristol Rovers	2022–23	League One	38	0	2	0	1	0	1	0	42	0
Bristol Rovers	2023–24	League One	0	0	0	0	0	0	2	0	2	0
Bristol Rovers	Total		80	0	6	0	2	0	3	0	91	0
Forest Green Rovers (loan)	2023–24	League Two	10	0	2	0	0	0	0	0	12	0
Harrogate Town (loan)	2023–24	League Two	6	0	0	0	0	0	0	0	6	0
Harrogate Town	2023–24	League Two	20	0	0	0	0	0	0	0	20	0
Harrogate Town	2024–25	League Two	45	0	3	0	2	0	0	0	50	0
Harrogate Town	2025–26	League Two	22	0	0	0	0	0	2	0	24	0
Harrogate Town	Harrogate Town total		254	0	12	0	2	0	15	0	283	0
Career total			344	0	20	0	4	0	18	0	386	0

== Honours ==
Harrogate Town

- National League North play-offs: 2018
- National League play-offs: 2020
- FA Trophy: 2019–20

Bristol Rovers

- EFL League Two third-place promotion: 2021–22

Notts County

- EFL League Two play-offs: 2026

Individual

- Bristol Rovers Player of the Year: 2021–22
