= Josh Grant (footballer) =

English footballer (born 1998)

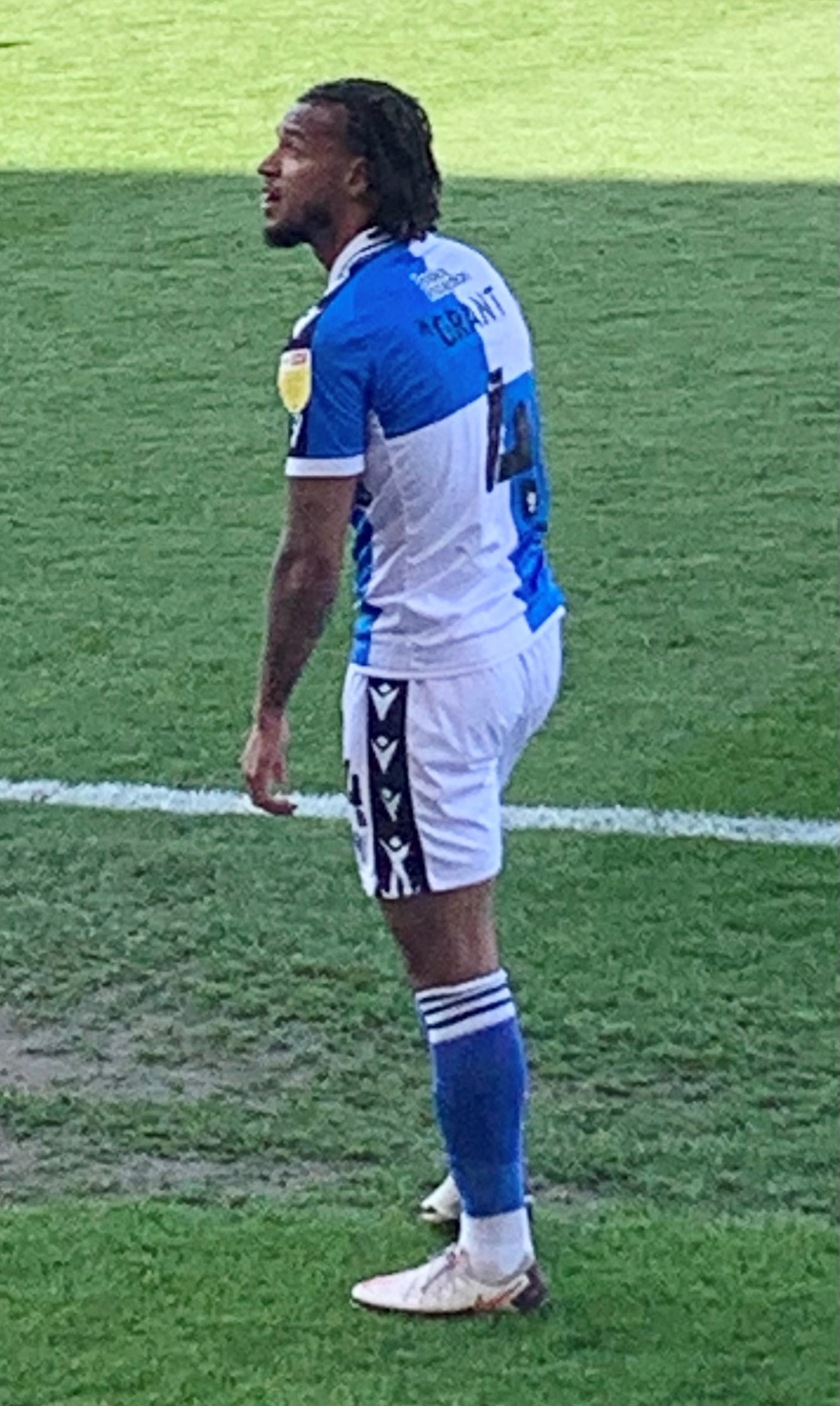
- Grant playing for Bristol Rovers in 2022.

Personal information
- Full name: Joshua William Grant
- Date of birth: 11 October 1998 (age 28)
- Place of birth: Brixton, England
- Height: 6 ft 0 in (1.83 m)
- Positions: Defender; defensive midfielder

Team information
- Current team: Woking
- Number: 28

Youth career
- 2006–2019: Chelsea

Senior career*
Years	Team	Apps	(Gls)
2019–2020	Chelsea	0	(0)
2019	→ Yeovil Town (loan)	8	(0)
2019–2020	→ Plymouth Argyle (loan)	22	(0)
2020–2024	Bristol Rovers	83	(5)
2024–2025	Wealdstone	24	(3)
2025–2026	Carlisle United	11	(0)
2026	→ Altrincham (loan)	12	(0)
2026–	Woking	3	(0)

International career
2016–2017	England U18	6	(0)
2017	England U20	4	(0)
- * Club domestic league appearances and goals as of 20:09, 22 November 2026 (UTC)

Joshua William Grant (born 11 October 1998) is an English professional footballer who plays as a defender and defensive midfielder for National League club Woking.

== Club career ==
=== Chelsea ===
Born in Brixton, London, Grant joined Chelsea at under-8 level. In January 2019, Grant joined EFL League Two club Yeovil Town on loan until the end of the 2018–19 season. He made his English Football League debut the day after joining Yeovil in a 1–0 win against Mansfield Town, on 12 January 2019. On 8 August 2019, Grant joined EFL League Two club Plymouth Argyle on loan until the end of 2019.

On 26 June 2020, it was announced that Grant would leave Chelsea upon the expiry of his contract at the end of the month.

=== Bristol Rovers ===
On 18 July 2020, Grant signed for League One club Bristol Rovers, signing a three-year deal. He made his debut for the club on 5 September 2020, in a 3-0 League Cup defeat to Ipswich Town. On 14 November, Grant scored his first goal for the club, halving the deficit to 2–1 in an eventual 4–1 defeat to Fleetwood Town.

Grant featured in all of Rovers' first ten matches in all competitions for the 2021–22 season before a recurring foot injury that he had suffered with the previous season forced him out of action. His return to action came on 7 November in a 2–2 FA Cup first round draw at League One Oxford United, Grant being utilised in a less-familiar left wing-back role in which he impressed. His first league match back came the following week, Grant scoring his first goal of the season when he headed home a Harry Anderson cross at the back post to equalise as the Gas came from behind to defeat Northampton Town. Despite an impressive run of form over the winter months, Grant again suffered from injuries, this time in the knee, that saw him ruled out for a number of weeks in February. Grant made a return to first-team action in April 2022, the season ending in success as Rovers were promoted on the final day of the season, a 7–0 victory over Scunthorpe United seeing Rovers move into third place on goals scored.

Having been limited to just ten minutes of action in the opening weeks of the 2022–23 season, manager Barton revealed in October 2022 that knee surgery would potentially be required. Having undergone the surgery the same month, Grant was ruled out of action for the remainder of the season. He was offered a new contract at the end of the season. On 25 May, it was confirmed that he had been signed a new one-year contract with the option for a further year.

Prior to the commencement of the 2023–24 season, it was confirmed that Grant was returning to full training having featured in only one pre-season friendly. He made his return to first-team football as a substitute on the opening day of the season, his first appearance in nearly twelve months. He was released by the club at the end of the 2023–24 season.

=== Wealdstone ===
On 15 November 2024, Grant joined National League club Wealdstone. He was offered a new contract at the end of the 2024–25 season.

=== Carlisle United ===
In July 2025, Grant joined National League club Carlisle United on a one-year deal.

On 6 January 2026, Grant joined fellow National League side Altrincham on loan for the remainder of the season.

He was released by Carlisle at the end of the 2025–26 season.

=== Woking ===
On 27 October 2026, Grant joined Woking on a short-term deal.

== International career ==
Grant made his debut for England under-18s in June 2016, before featuring for the victorious England under-20 side at the 2017 Toulon Tournament.

== Career statistics ==
As of 22 November 2026

Appearances and goals by club, season and competition
Club	Season	League			FA Cup		League Cup		Other		Total	
Club	Season	Division	Apps	Goals	Apps	Goals	Apps	Goals	Apps	Goals	Apps	Goals
Chelsea	2018–19	Premier League	0	0	0	0	0	0	0	0	0	0
Chelsea	2019–20	Premier League	0	0	0	0	0	0	0	0	0	0
Chelsea	Total		0	0	0	0	0	0	0	0	0	0
Yeovil Town (loan)	2018–19	League Two	8	0	0	0	0	0	0	0	8	0
Plymouth Argyle (loan)	2019–20	League Two	22	0	3	0	2	0	3 (Note: Appearance(s) in EFL Trophy)	0	30	0
Bristol Rovers	2020–21	League One	32	1	3	0	1	0	3	0	39	1
Bristol Rovers	2021–22	League Two	21	3	2	0	1	0	1	0	25	3
Bristol Rovers	2022–23	League One	1	0	0	0	0	0	0	0	1	0
Bristol Rovers	2023–24	League One	29	1	3	0	1	0	3	0	36	1
Bristol Rovers	Total		83	5	8	0	3	0	7	0	101	5
Wealdstone	2024–25	National League	24	3	0	0	—		3 (Note: Includes FA Trophy and National League Cup)	0	27	3
Carlisle United	2025–26	National League	11	0	2	1	—		0	0	13	1
Woking	2026–27	National League	3	0	—		—		1 (Note: Appearance(s) in National League Cup)	0	4	0
Career total			151	8	13	1	5	0	14	0	183	9

== Honours ==
Bristol Rovers

- League Two promotion: 2021–22
