= Brandon Aguilera =

Costa Rican footballer (born 2003)

Personal information
- Full name: Brandon Aguilera Zamora
- Date of birth: 28 June 2003 (age 23)
- Place of birth: Naranjo, Costa Rica
- Height: 1.79 m (5 ft 10 in)
- Position: Midfielder

Team information
- Current team: Rio Ave
- Number: 10

Senior career*
| Years | Team | Apps | (Gls) |
| 2018–2019 | Carmelita | 4 | (1) |
| 2019–2022 | Alajuelense | 40 | (3) |
| 2021–2023 | → Guanacasteca (loan) | 28 | (6) |
| 2022–2024 | Nottingham Forest | 1 | (0) |
| 2023 | → Estoril (loan) | 0 | (0) |
| 2024 | → Bristol Rovers (loan) | 12 | (2) |
| 2024– | Rio Ave | 44 | (4) |

International career^{‡}
| 2018 | Costa Rica U15 | 1 | (0) |
| 2018–2019 | Costa Rica U17 | 4 | (0) |
| 2022 | Costa Rica U20 | 5 | (0) |
| 2022– | Costa Rica | 29 | (0) |
- * Club domestic league appearances and goals as of 16:33, 7 February 2026 (UTC) ‡ National team caps and goals as of 23:18, 29 June 2025 (UTC)

Brandon Aguilera Zamora (born 28 June 2003) is a Costa Rican professional footballer who plays as a midfielder for Primeira Liga club Rio Ave and the Costa Rica national team.

== Club career ==
In July 2022 Premier League side Nottingham Forest announced they had signed Aguilera on a four-year deal from Alajuelense, and would immediately be loaned to fellow Costa Rican side Guanacasteca for six months. In January 2023, Aguilera joined Primeira Liga club Estoril on loan until the end of the season. He played with the team's under 23 squad.

On 1 February 2024, Aguilera joined League One club Bristol Rovers on loan until the end of the season. He made an impressive debut for the club two days after signing, scoring the only goal in a 1–0 victory over Exeter City, smashing the ball into the top corner from twenty yards. In just his third match of his loan spell however, he picked up a hamstring injury, having to temporarily return to his parent club. At the Bristol Rovers end of season awards, he was awarded the club's Goal of the Season for his debut strike.

On 2 July 2024, Aguilera signed with Portuguese Primeira Liga side Rio Ave on a three-year deal for an undisclosed fee.

== International career ==
A youth international for Costa Rica since 2018, Aguilera made his senior team debut against the United States on 30 March 2022. In November 2022 he was named to the 26-man Costa Rica squad for the 2022 FIFA World Cup.

== Career statistics ==
=== Club ===
As of 22 April 2025

Appearances and goals by club, season and competition
| Club | Season | League | | | National Cup | | League Cup | | Continental | | Other | | Total | |
| Club | Season | Division | Apps | Goals | Apps | Goals | Apps | Goals | Apps | Goals | Apps | Goals | Apps | Goals |
|---|---|---|---|---|---|---|---|---|---|---|---|---|---|---|
| Carmelita | 2018–19 | Liga FPD | 4 | 1 | 0 | 0 | — | | 0 | 0 | 0 | 0 | 4 | 1 |
| Alajuelense | 2019–20 | Liga FPD | 2 | 0 | 0 | 0 | — | | 0 | 0 | 0 | 0 | 2 | 0 |
| Alajuelense | 2020–21 | Liga FPD | 26 | 1 | 0 | 0 | — | | 3 (Note: Two appearances in CONCACAF League, one appearance in CONCACAF Champions Cup) | 0 | 0 | 0 | 29 | 1 |
| Alajuelense | 2021–22 | Liga FPD | 12 | 0 | 1 | 0 | — | | 1 | 0 | 0 | 0 | 14 | 0 |
| Alajuelense | Total | | 40 | 1 | 1 | 0 | — | | 4 | 0 | 0 | 0 | 45 | 1 |
| Nottingham Forest | 2022–23 | Premier League | 0 | 0 | 0 | 0 | 0 | 0 | — | | — | | 0 | 0 |
| Nottingham Forest | 2023–24 | Premier League | 1 | 0 | 1 | 0 | 1 | 0 | — | | — | | 3 | 0 |
| Nottingham Forest | Total | | 1 | 0 | 1 | 0 | 1 | 0 | — | | — | | 3 | 0 |
| Guanacasteca (loan) | 2021–22 | Liga FPD | 18 | 4 | 0 | 0 | — | | 0 | 0 | 0 | 0 | 18 | 4 |
| Guanacasteca (loan) | 2022–23 | Liga FPD | 10 | 0 | 0 | 0 | — | | 0 | 0 | 0 | 0 | 10 | 0 |
| Guanacasteca (loan) | Total | | 28 | 4 | 0 | 0 | 0 | 0 | 0 | 0 | 0 | 0 | 28 | 4 |
| Estoril (loan) | 2022–23 | Primeira Liga | 0 | 0 | 0 | 0 | 0 | 0 | 0 | 0 | 0 | 0 | 0 | 0 |
| Nottingham Forest U21 | 2023–24 | — | | | — | | — | | — | | 1 (Note: Appearance in EFL Trophy) | 0 | 1 | 0 |
| Bristol Rovers (loan) | 2023–24 | League One | 12 | 2 | — | | — | | — | | 0 | 0 | 12 | 2 |
| Rio Ave | 2024–25 | Primeira Liga | 25 | 3 | 4 | 0 | 0 | 0 | — | | — | | 29 | 3 |
| Career total | | | 106 | 11 | 6 | 0 | 1 | 0 | 4 | 0 | 1 | 0 | 118 | 11 |

=== International ===
As of match played 29 June 2025

Appearances and goals by national team and year
| National team | Year | Apps | Goals |
|---|---|---|---|
| Costa Rica | 2022 | 8 | 0 |
| Costa Rica | 2023 | 4 | 0 |
| Costa Rica | 2024 | 12 | 0 |
| Costa Rica | 2025 | 5 | 0 |
| Total | | 29 | 0 |

== Honours ==
Alajuelense

- Liga FPD: Apertura 2020
- CONCACAF League: 2020

Individual

- Bristol Rovers Goal of the Season: 2023–24
