= 1991–92 Bristol Rovers F.C. season =

Bristol Rovers
1991–92 season
- Chairman: Geoff Dunford
- Manager: Martin Dobson (until October); Dennis Rofe (from October)
- Football League Second Division: 13th W:16 D:14 L:16 F:60 A:63
- FA Cup: Fourth Round
- Rumbelows Cup: Third Round
- Zenith Data Systems Cup: Southern First Round
- Top goalscorer: League: Carl Saunders (10); Devon White (10); All: Carl Saunders (16)
- Highest home attendance: 9,483 (vs Liverpool, 5 February 1992)
- Lowest home attendance: 3,565 (vs Port Vale, 2 November 1991)

Bristol Rovers F.C. spent the 1991–92 season in the Football League Second Division.

== League table ==
Pos	Team	Pld	W	D	L	GF	GA	GD	Pts
11	Wolverhampton Wanderers	46	18	10	18	61	54	+7	64
12	Southend United	46	17	11	18	63	63	0	62
13	Bristol Rovers	46	16	14	16	60	63	−3	62
14	Tranmere Rovers	46	14	19	13	56	56	0	61
15	Millwall	46	17	10	19	64	71	−7	61

Rules for classification: 1) Points; 2) Goal difference; 3) Goals scored
