= Antony Evans (footballer) =

English footballer (born 1998)

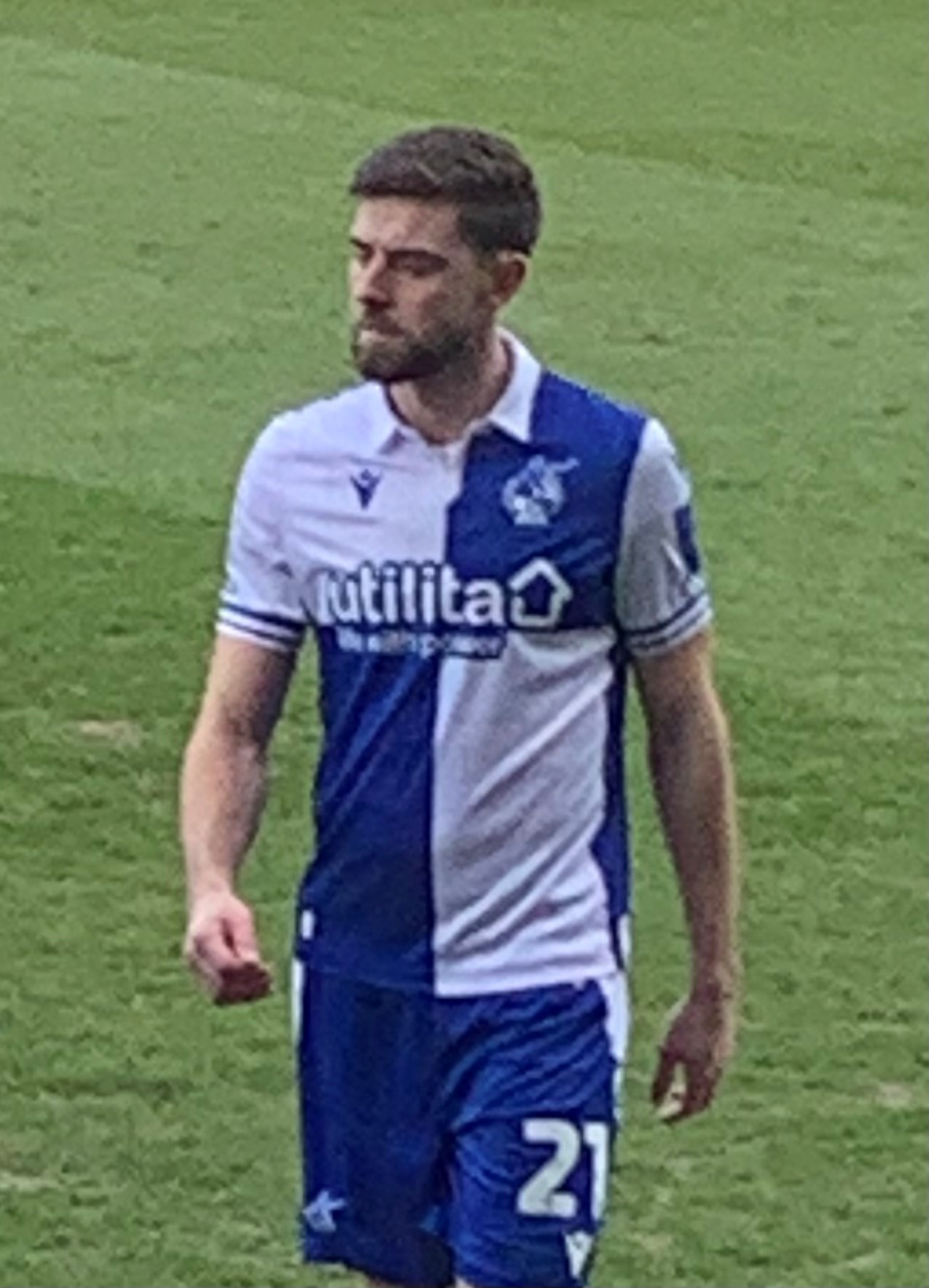
- Evans at Bristol Rovers in 2024.

Personal information
- Full name: Antony Kenneth Evans
- Date of birth: 23 September 1998 (age 28)
- Place of birth: Liverpool, England
- Height: 1.86 m (6 ft 1 in)
- Position: Attacking midfielder

Team information
- Current team: Huddersfield Town
- Number: 21

Youth career
- 2010–2017: Everton

Senior career*
Years	Team	Apps	(Gls)
2017–2020	Everton	0	(0)
2017	→ Morecambe (loan)	14	(2)
2019	→ Blackpool (loan)	12	(0)
2020–2021	SC Paderborn	7	(0)
2020	SC Paderborn II	2	(1)
2021	→ Crewe Alexandra (loan)	14	(0)
2021–2024	Bristol Rovers	121	(21)
2024–	Huddersfield Town	34	(2)
2026–	→ Walsall (loan)	0	(0)

International career
2016	England U19	2	(0)
- * Club domestic league appearances and goals as of 5 May 2025 (UTC)

Antony Kenneth Evans (born 23 September 1998) is an English professional footballer who plays as an attacking midfielder for EFL League Two club Walsall on loan from EFL League One club Huddersfield Town.

== Club career ==
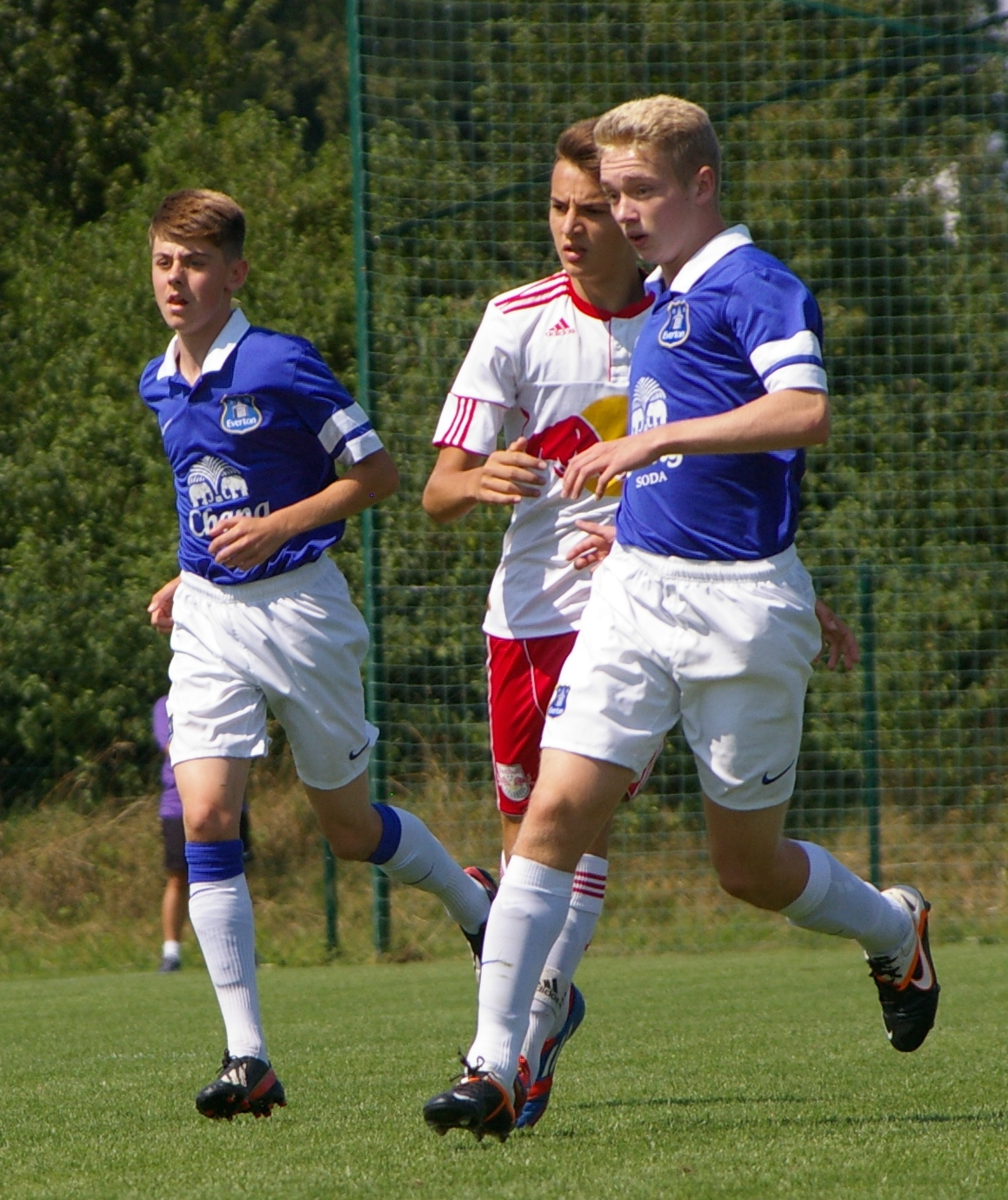
Evans (left) playing for Everton in 2013.

Evans joined the Everton academy at the age of nine after previously training with Liverpool. He signed a professional contract with the Toffees in October 2015. In January 2017 Evans joined League Two side Morecambe on loan for the rest of the 2016–17 season. He made his professional debut on 4 February 2017 in a 1–1 draw away at Doncaster Rovers.

In January 2019, he joined Blackpool on loan until the end of the season.

On 29 January 2020, Evans joined Bundesliga side SC Paderborn 07 on a two-and-a-half-year deal.

On 23 January 2021, Evans joined League One side Crewe Alexandra on loan for the remainder of the 2020–21 season, making his debut in a 4–1 defeat at Gillingham on 26 January.

On 20 August 2021, Evans was released by SC Paderborn.

=== Bristol Rovers ===
On 31 August 2021, Evans joined recently relegated League Two side Bristol Rovers on a one-year deal. He made his debut for the club that weekend, setting up the only goal of the game with a cross from the right-hand side, assisting fellow Deadline Day signing Leon Clarke as his new club defeated Crawley Town. On 9 October 2021, he opened his account for the club with the first goal in a 3–0 win over Carlisle United. On the final day of the League Two season, Evans took his league tally to ten goals for the season, as well as reaching twelve assists, as Rovers thrashed Scunthorpe United 7–0 to match Northampton Town's goal difference and overtake them on a goals scored basis, Rovers taking the final automatic promotion place in dramatic fashion. He was also awarded the club's goal of the season award for his long-range late strike against Barrow. In June 2022, after weeks of speculation, Evans signed a new three-year contract with the club.

Following an impressive 2023–24 season, Evans was awarded the Bristol Rovers F.C. Player of the Year. With just twelve months remaining on his contract, manager Matt Taylor confirmed that the club had offered Evans a new contract amid reported interest from League One champions Portsmouth.

=== Huddersfield Town ===
On 4 July 2024, Evans signed for fellow League One club Huddersfield Town for an undisclosed fee, reported to be in the region of £450,000. He made his debut on the opening day of the 2024–25 season, opening the scoring in a 2–0 victory over Peterborough United. Following an underwhelming first season for the club, Evans was reportedly told that he was free to leave following the conclusion of the 2024–25 season, however a move failed to materialise.

On 1 August 2026, Evans joined for League Two club Walsall on a season long loan reuniting with previous Huddersfield manager Lee Grant.

== International career ==
Evans has represented England at under-19 level, playing against the Netherlands and Belgium.

== Career statistics ==
As of 3 May 2025

Appearances and goals by club, season and competition
Club	Season	League			National cup (Note: Includes appearances in DFB-Pokal and FA Cup)		League cup (Note: Includes EFL Cup)		Other		Total	
Club	Season	Division	Apps	Goals	Apps	Goals	Apps	Goals	Apps	Goals	Apps	Goals
Everton	2016–17	Premier League	0	0	0	0	0	0	0	0	0	0
Morecambe (loan)	2016–17	League Two	14	2	0	0	0	0	0	0	14	2
Blackpool (loan)	2018–19	League One	12	0	0	0	0	0	0	0	12	0
SC Paderborn	2019–20	Bundesliga	6	0	0	0	0	0	0	0	6	0
SC Paderborn	2020–21	2. Bundesliga	1	0	1	0	0	0	0	0	2	0
SC Paderborn	Total		7	0	1	0	0	0	0	0	8	0
Crewe Alexandra (loan)	2020–21	League One	14	0	0	0	0	0	0	0	14	0
Bristol Rovers	2021–22	League Two	35	10	4	1	0	0	0	0	39	11
Bristol Rovers	2022–23	League One	43	5	2	0	1	0	5 (Note: Appearance(s) in EFL Trophy)	0	51	5
Bristol Rovers	2023–24	League One	43	6	4	2	1	0	4	2	52	10
Bristol Rovers	Total		121	21	10	3	2	0	9	2	142	26
Huddersfield Town	2024–25	League One	34	2	0	0	1	0	2	0	37	2
Huddersfield Town	2025–26	League One	0	0	0	0	0	0	0	0	0	0
Huddersfield Town	Total		34	2	0	0	1	0	2	0	37	2
Career total			202	25	11	3	3	0	11	2	227	30

== Honours ==
Bristol Rovers

- EFL League Two third-place promotion: 2021–22

Individual

- Bristol Rovers Player of the Year: 2023–24
