= Connor Taylor (footballer, born 2001) =

English footballer

- Taylor with Wycombe Wanderers in 2026

Personal information
- Full name: Connor Taylor
- Date of birth: 25 October 2001 (age 25)
- Place of birth: Stoke-on-Trent, England
- Height: 6 ft 6 in (1.98 m)
- Position: Centre-back

Team information
- Current team: Wycombe Wanderers
- Number: 26

Youth career
- Port Vale
- 2017–2019: Stafford Rangers
- 2019–2021: Stoke City

Senior career*
Years	Team	Apps	(Gls)
2021–2023	Stoke City	15	(0)
2020	→ Ashton United (loan)	1	(0)
2020–2021	→ Chester (loan)	3	(0)
2021–2022	→ Bristol Rovers (loan)	42	(3)
2023–2025	Bristol Rovers	75	(1)
2025–	Wycombe Wanderers	41	(3)

International career
2018–2019	England Schoolboys		
- * Club domestic league appearances and goals as of 11 October 2026 (UTC)

Connor Taylor (born 25 October 2001) is an English professional footballer who plays as a defender for EFL League One club Wycombe Wanderers.

Taylor spent his youth at Port Vale's academy and Stafford Rangers before signing a one-year scholarship with Stoke City in September 2019. He went on to spend brief spells on loan at non-League clubs Ashton United and Chester. He spent the 2021–22 season on loan at Bristol Rovers and won the club's Young Player of the Year award after helping Rovers to win promotion out of League Two. Bristol Rovers signed him for an undisclosed fee in August 2023. He was named Bristol Rovers Player of the Year for the 2024–25 relegation season. He was sold to Wycombe Wanderers in August 2025.

== Early life ==
Connor Taylor was born on 25 October 2001 and grew up in the Eaton Park area of Stoke-on-Trent.

== Career ==
=== Stoke City ===
Taylor started his career at Port Vale's academy before going on to join Stafford Rangers. He made some substitute appearances for Stafford in the 2018–19 season and represented England Schoolboys. In September 2019 Taylor signed a one-year scholarship with Stoke City and joined their U23 squad. In October 2020, Taylor spent time at Ashton United on work experience, playing in an FA Trophy game against Clitheroe and a Northern Premier League Premier Division match with Whitby Town. Taylor joined National League North side Chester on a one-month loan deal on 18 December 2020. Anthony Johnson, joint-manager of the "Blues", said that "he has looked like a 30-year-old centre back who has been playing for 12 years not someone that has just been dropped in for their debut". The loan was extended until the end of January 2021. Taylor signed a new 18-month contract with Stoke in February 2021. Taylor made his senior debut for the "Potters" on 21 April 2021, coming on as a 17th-minute substitute for James Chester in a 3–2 defeat to Coventry City at the Bet365 Stadium.

On 17 June 2021, Taylor joined Bristol Rovers on loan for the 2021–22 season. Taylor contracted COVID-19 and the "Pirates" got off to a poor start to the campaign, but manager Joey Barton described Taylor as a "colossus" after Rovers picked up their first League Two win of the season in a 1–0 win over Crawley Town at the Memorial Stadium on 4 September. On 25 September 2021, Taylor scored a first career goal as he equalised with ten minutes to go as Rovers got a last-minute comeback victory at Walsall, the club's first away win in nine months. Taylor's impressive early-season form continued and on 12 November, he was awarded the EFL Young Player of the Month Award. This came after two clean sheets in six matches and an impressive man of the match performance as Rovers defeated high-flying Harrogate Town, Taylor winning 13 aerial duels. In February 2022, it was revealed by Barton that Taylor would undergo heart surgery at the end of the season after feeling unwell in a warm-up against Oldham. In April 2022, Taylor was nominated for the League Two Young Player of the Season Award, facing competition from Leyton Orient's Shadrach Ogie and Newport County's Finn Azaz, missing out on the award to the latter. On 7 May 2022, Taylor scored the second goal in a final day 7–0 thrashing of Scunthorpe United that saw Rovers overtake Northampton Town into the final automatic promotion place on goals scored. The following day at the end of season awards, Taylor was named as the Bristol Rovers Young Player of the Season.

On 14 July 2022, Taylor signed a new three-year contract with Stoke. He made 18 appearances in the 2022–23 campaign, including eleven starts in the Championship. Bristol Rovers manager Joey Barton had attempted to sign him in the January transfer window after Taylor had been dropped since Alex Neil replaced Michael O'Neill as Stoke manager; however, the bids were rejected. Taylor had started six times under O'Neill, but was absent from the first-team between September and January.

=== Bristol Rovers ===
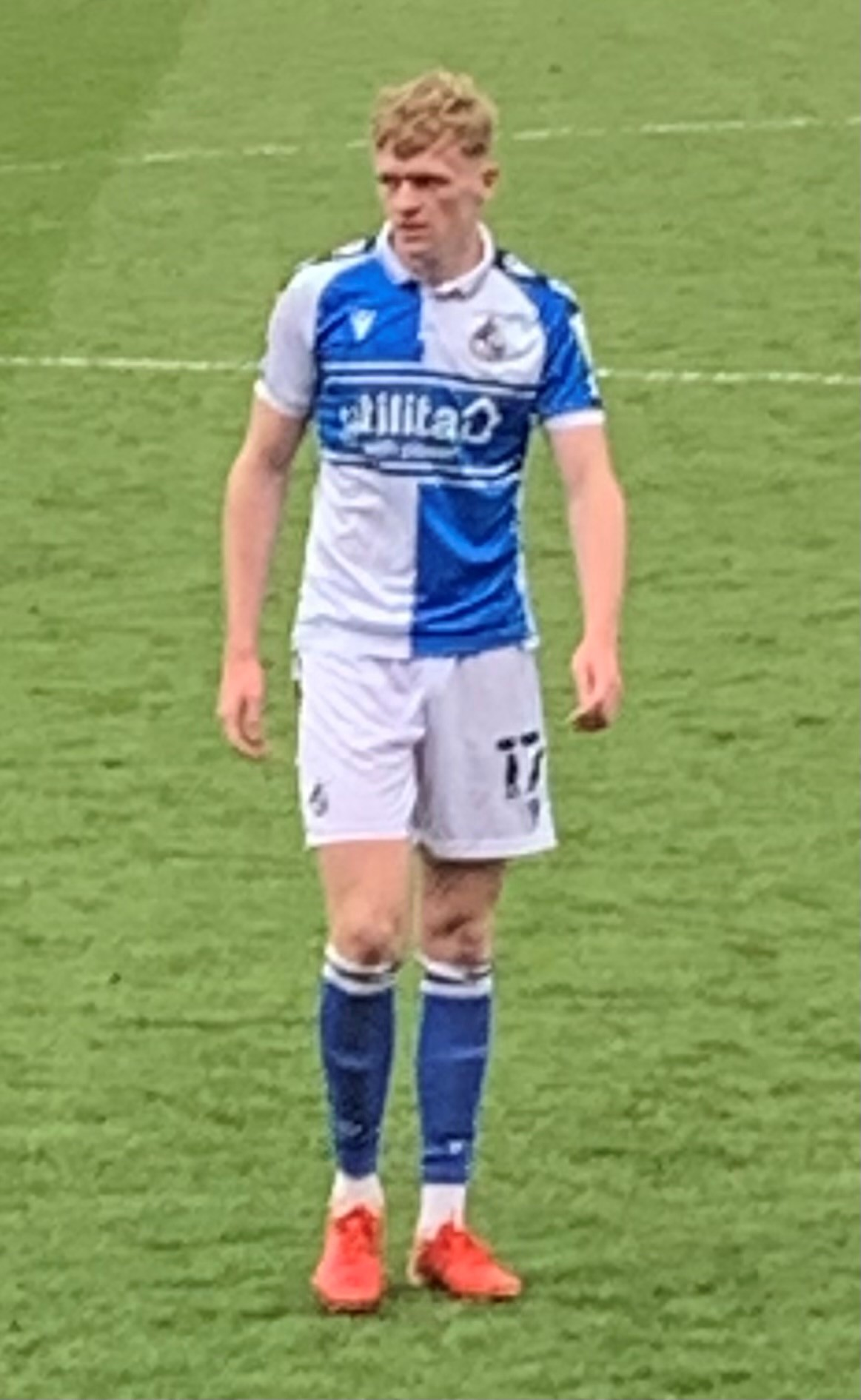
Taylor with Bristol Rovers in 2022

On 3 August 2023, Taylor returned to Bristol Rovers – now a League One side – on a three-year deal for an undisclosed fee, widely reported to be in the region of £300,000. He spent the second half of the 2023–24 season plagued by a knee injury sustained in January, undergoing surgery in April 2024 to hopefully fix the problem for the start of the following season.

On 29 October 2024, Taylor scored his first goal since his permanent return to the club, netting in a 3–2 EFL Trophy defeat to Exeter City. Despite the 2024–25 season ending in disappointment for Rovers, relegated back to League Two, Taylor was voted as the Supporters' Club Player of the Year.

In May 2025, Taylor was subject of reported interest from League One side Peterborough United. On 2 August 2025, having been absent from the matchday squad for the opening day defeat to Harrogate Town, manager Darrell Clarke announced that Taylor had handed in a transfer request having been subject of a number of transfer offers. Across his two spells with the Gas, Taylor played 136 times, scoring six goals. Upon his departure, it was reported that the "sale is understood to have generated a healthy profit on the reported £300,000 Rovers paid for him from Stoke City in 2023 with the BBC reporting the fee is in excess of £500,000".

=== Wycombe Wanderers ===
On 6 August 2025, Taylor returned to League One, joining Wycombe Wanderers for an undisclosed fee after head coach Mike Dodds felt that "his height, ability on the ball and strong defensive attributes" would strengthen the team. He received the first red card of his career on 1 November, having pulled down Lorent Tolaj in a 2–0 victory over Plymouth Argyle in the first round of the FA Cup. On 28 March 2026, he scored in a 4–0 win at Port Vale, picking up the highest WhoScored.com rating of League Two that weekend. Manager Michael Duff went on to praise him for his hard work and recent form.

== Style of play ==
Taylor is a quick centre-back who is comfortable on the ball.

== Career statistics ==
As of end of 2025–26 season

Appearances and goals by club, season and competition
Club	Season	League			FA Cup		EFL Cup		Other		Total	
Club	Season	Division	Apps	Goals	Apps	Goals	Apps	Goals	Apps	Goals	Apps	Goals
Stoke City	2020–21	Championship	1	0	0	0	0	0	—		1	0
Stoke City	2021–22	Championship	0	0	0	0	0	0	—		0	0
Stoke City	2022–23	Championship	14	0	3	0	1	0	—		18	0
Stoke City	Stoke City total		15	0	3	0	1	0	—		19	0
Ashton United (loan)	2020–21	Northern Premier League; Premier Division	1	0	0	0	—		1 (Note: Appearance(s) in FA Trophy)	0	2	0
Chester (loan)	2020–21	National League North	3	0	0	0	—		—		3	0
Bristol Rovers (loan)	2021–22	League Two	42	3	3	0	1	0	1 (Note: Appearance(s) in EFL Trophy)	0	47	3
Bristol Rovers	2023–24	League One	33	0	4	0	1	0	3	0	41	0
Bristol Rovers	2024–25	League One	42	1	2	1	1	0	3	1	48	3
Bristol Rovers	2025–26	League Two	0	0	0	0	0	0	0	0	0	0
Bristol Rovers	Bristol Rovers total		117	4	9	1	3	0	7	1	136	6
Wycombe Wanderers	2025–26	League One	32	2	2	0	1	0	2	0	37	2
Wycombe Wanderers	2026–27	League One	0	0	0	0	0	0	0	0	0	0
Wycombe Wanderers	Total		32	2	2	0	1	0	2	0	37	2
Career total			168	6	14	1	5	0	10	1	197	8

== Honours ==
Bristol Rovers

- EFL League Two third-place promotion: 2021–22

Individual

- EFL Young Player of the Month: October 2021
- Bristol Rovers Supporters' Club Player of the Year: 2024–25
- Bristol Rovers Young Player of the Year: 2021–22
