= 2023–24 Bristol Rovers F.C. season =

141st season in existence of Bristol Rovers FC

Bristol Rovers
2023–24 season
- Owner: Hussain AlSaeed
- CEO: Tom Gorringe
- Manager: Joey Barton (until 26 October); Andy Mangan (interim - between 26 Oct - 1 Dec); Matt Taylor (from 1 December)
- Stadium: Memorial Stadium
- League One: 15th
- FA Cup: Third round
- EFL Cup: First round
- EFL Trophy: Second round
- Top goalscorer: League: Chris Martin (16); All: Chris Martin (16)
- Highest home attendance: 10,335 vs. Norwich City (17 January 2024, FA Cup Third round replay)
- Lowest home attendance: 978 vs. West Ham United U21 (19 September 2023, EFL Trophy Group Stage)
- Average home league attendance: 8,190
Home colours	Away colours

The 2023–24 season is the 141st season in the history of Bristol Rovers and their second consecutive season in League One. The club are participating in League One, the FA Cup, the EFL Cup, and the 2023–24 EFL Trophy.

== Current squad ==
As of 28 March 2024

No.	Name	Position	Nationality	Date of birth (age)	Previous club	Date signed	Fee	Contract end
Goalkeepers
31	Jed Ward	GK	(England)	20 May 2003 (aged 21)	Academy	1 July 2023	Trainee	30 June 2028
33	Matthew Cox	GK	(England)	2 May 2003 (aged 21)	Brentford	25 July 2023	Loan	31 May 2024
35	Matt Hall	GK	(England)	24 April 2003 (aged 21)	Southampton	26 July 2023	Free	30 June 2025
Defenders
2	James Connolly	CB	(Wales)	2 November 2001 (aged 22)	Cardiff City	1 July 2022	Undisclosed	30 June 2025
3	Lewis Gordon	LB	(Scotland)	12 February 2001 (aged 23)	Brenford	6 August 2022	Free	30 June 2024
5	James Wilson	CB	(Wales)	26 February 1989 (aged 35)	Plymouth Argyle	1 July 2023	Free	30 June 2025
17	Connor Taylor	CB	(England)	25 October 2001 (aged 22)	Stoke City	3 August 2023	Undisclosed	30 June 2026
25	Tristan Crama	CB	(France)	8 November 2001 (aged 22)	Brentford	25 July 2023	Loan	31 May 2024
26	Elkan Baggott	CB	(Indonesia)	23 October 2002 (aged 21)	Ipswich Town	1 February 2024	Loan	31 May 2024
30	Luca Hoole	RB	(Wales)	2 June 2002 (aged 22)	Academy	1 July 2021	Trainee	30 June 2024
32	George Friend	LB	(England)	19 October 1987 (aged 36)	Birmingham City	4 July 2023	Free	30 June 2024
42	Jack Hunt	RB	(England)	6 December 1990 (aged 33)	Sheffield Wednesday	17 August 2023	Free	30 June 2025
Midfielders
4	Josh Grant	DM	(England)	11 October 1998 (aged 25)	Chelsea	18 July 2020	Free	30 June 2024
6	Sam Finley	CM	(England)	4 August 1992 (aged 31)	Fleetwood Town	1 July 2021	Free	30 June 2024
8	Grant Ward	CM	(England)	5 December 1994 (aged 29)	Blackpool	27 January 2023	Free	30 June 2025
10	Brandon Aguilera	AM	(Costa Rica)	28 June 2003 (aged 21)	Nottingham Forest	1 February 2024	Loan	31 May 2024
14	Jordan Rossiter	DM	(England)	24 March 1997 (aged 27)	Fleetwood Town	1 July 2022	Undisclosed	30 June 2024
19	Harvey Vale	AM	(England)	11 September 2003 (aged 20)	Chelsea	15 August 2023	Loan	31 May 2024
21	Antony Evans	AM	(England)	23 September 1998 (aged 25)	SC Paderborn	31 August 2021	Free	30 June 2025
22	Kamil Conteh	DM	(Sierra Leone)	26 December 2002 (aged 21)	Grimsby Town	26 January 2024	Undisclosed	30 June 2027
23	Luke McCormick	AM	(England)	21 January 1999 (aged 25)	AFC Wimbledon	24 August 2022	Undisclosed	30 June 2025
34	Jerry Lawrence	CM	(England)	5 March 2005 (aged 19)	Academy	1 July 2023	Trainee	30 June 2024
37	Kofi Shaw	CM	(England)	4 December 2006 (aged 17)	Academy	13 November 2023	Trainee	30 June 2024
45	Harry Vaughan	AM	(Republic of Ireland)	6 April 2004 (aged 20)	Hull City	1 February 2024	Loan	31 May 2024
Forwards
7	Scott Sinclair	LW	(England)	25 March 1989 (aged 35)	Preston North End	18 October 2022	Free	30 June 2024
9	John Marquis	CF	(England)	16 May 1992 (aged 32)	Lincoln City	4 July 2022	Free	30 June 2024
11	Luke Thomas	RW	(England)	19 February 1999 (aged 25)	Barnsley	1 July 2023	Free	30 June 2026
18	Chris Martin	CF	(Scotland)	4 November 1988 (aged 35)	Queens Park Rangers	26 September 2023	Free	30 June 2024
20	Jevani Brown	CF	(Jamaica)	16 October 1994 (aged 29)	Exeter City	1 July 2023	Free	30 June 2025
43	Ollie Dewsbury	CF	(Wales)	22 February 2008 (aged 16)	Academy	3 November 2023	Trainee	30 June 2024
	Harvey Greenslade	CF	(England)	8 April 2004 (aged 20)	Academy	1 July 2022	Trainee	30 June 2024
Out on loan
28	James Gibbons	RB	(England)	16 March 1998 (aged 26)	Port Vale	1 July 2022	Free	30 June 2024
	Ryan Jones	CM	(England)	23 May 2002 (aged 22)	Weston-super-Mare	16 October 2020	Undisclosed	30 June 2024

== Transfers ==
=== In ===
Date	Pos	Player	Transferred from	Fee	Ref
1 July 2023	CF	Jevani Brown (JAM)	Exeter City (ENG)	Free transfer	
1 July 2023	RW	Luke Thomas (ENG)	Barnsley (ENG)	Free transfer	
1 July 2023	CB	James Wilson (WAL)	Plymouth Argyle (ENG)	Free transfer	
4 July 2023	LB	George Friend (ENG)	Birmingham City (ENG)	Free transfer	
26 July 2023	GK	Matt Hall (ENG)	Southampton (ENG)	Free transfer	
3 August 2023	CB	Connor Taylor (ENG)	Stoke City (ENG)	Undisclosed fee	
17 August 2023	RB	Jack Hunt (ENG)	Sheffield Wednesday (ENG)	Free transfer	
27 September 2023	CF	Chris Martin (SCO)	Free agent	—N/a	
26 January 2024	DM	Kamil Conteh (SLE)	Grimsby Town (ENG)	Undisclosed fee	

=== Out ===
Date	Pos	Player	Transferred to	Fee	Ref
30 June 2023	RM	Harry Anderson (ENG)	Stevenage (ENG)	Released	
30 June 2023	CM	Paul Coutts (SCO)	Inverurie Loco Works (SCO)	Released	
30 June 2023	LB	Calum Macdonald (SCO)	Mansfield Town (ENG)	Released	
30 June 2023	RM	Alex Rodman (ENG)	Retired	—N/a	
30 June 2023	CB	Malik Sesay (ENG)	Swindon Supermarine (ENG)	Released	
30 June 2023	CM	Glenn Whelan (IRL)	Retired	—N/a	
30 June 2023	RW	Lucas Vaughan (ENG)	Lydney Town (ENG)	Released	
5 July 2023	CB	Jamie Egan (IRL)	Drogheda United (IRL)	Free transfer	
3 August 2023	CM	Lene Burden (ENG)	Hayes & Yeading United (ENG)	Free transfer	
1 September 2023	CF	Ryan Loft (ENG)	Port Vale (ENG)	Undisclosed fee	
11 January 2024	GK	James Belshaw (ENG)	Harrogate Town (ENG)	Undisclosed fee	
13 January 2024	LB	Trevor Clarke (IRL)	Shamrock Rovers (IRL)	Contract terminated	
1 February 2024	CF	Aaron Collins (WAL)	Bolton Wanderers (ENG)	Undisclosed fee (Note: The transfer was reported to be around £750,000 by The Bolton News.)	

=== Loaned in ===
Date	Pos	Player	Loaned from	On loan until	Ref
25 July 2023	GK	Matthew Cox (ENG)	Brentford (ENG)	End of season	
25 July 2023	CB	Tristan Crama (FRA)	Brentford (ENG)	End of season	
15 August 2023	AM	Harvey Vale (ENG)	Chelsea (ENG)	End of season	
18 August 2023	DM	Lamare Bogarde (NED)	Aston Villa (ENG)	4 January 2024 (Note: Bogarde was recalled from his season-long loan deal on 4 January 2024)	
25 August 2023	CM	Ryan Woods (ENG)	Hull City (ENG)	10 January 2024 (Note: Woods returned to his parent club on 10 January 2024)	
1 February 2024	CB	Elkan Baggott (IDN)	Ipswich Town (ENG)	End of season	
1 February 2024	AM	Harry Vaughan (IRL)	Hull City (ENG)	End of season	
1 February 2024	AM	Brandon Aguilera (CRC)	Nottingham Forest (ENG)	End of season	

=== Loaned out ===
Date	Pos	Player	Loaned to	On loan until	Ref
6 January 2022	LB	Trevor Clarke (IRL)	Shamrock Rovers (IRL)	30 November 2023	
25 July 2023	GK	Jed Ward (ENG)	Wealdstone (ENG)	14 November 2023 (Note: Ward's season-long loan deal was ended early when he was recalled on 14 November 2023)	
12 August 2023	CF	Harvey Greenslade (ENG)	Truro City (ENG)	October 2023	
31 August 2023	CB	James Connolly (WAL)	Morecambe (ENG)	3 January 2024 (Note: Connolly was recalled from his season-long loan deal on 3 January 2024)	
1 September 2023	CM	Ryan Jones (ENG)	Bromley (ENG)	End of season (Note: On 8 January, Jones' loan at Bromley was extended until the end of season.)	
30 September 2023	GK	James Belshaw (ENG)	Forest Green Rovers (ENG)	14 December 2023 (Note: Although an emergency one-week loan deal, Belshaw remained with the club until 14 December 2023)	
6 October 2023	CB	Will Larvin (ENG)	Yate Town (ENG)	6 November 2023	
12 October 2023	CM	Theo Lynden (ENG)	Melksham Town (ENG)	12 November 2023	
21 October 2023	CM	Jerry Lawrence (ENG)	Tiverton Town (ENG)	November 2023	
15 December 2023	GK	James Belshaw (ENG)	Harrogate Town (ENG)	12 January 2024 (Note: On 22 December, Belshaw's loan at Harrogate was extended for a further seven days.) (Note: On 5 January, Belshaw's loan at Harrogate was extended for an additional seven days.)	
30 January 2024	RB	James Gibbons (ENG)	Cambridge United (ENG)	End of season	
3 February 2024	CF	Harvey Greenslade (ENG)	Oxford City (ENG)	End of season	

== Preseason and friendlies ==
On 27 June, Rovers revealed their pre-season schedule, with matches against Melksham Town, Eastleigh, Brentford B, Swansea City and Chesterfield.

Win Draw Loss Fixtures

30 June 2023 Friendly	Melksham Town	0–9	Bristol Rovers	Melksham
19:30 BST			Sinclair 12', 33'; McCormick 14'; Thomas 41', 42'; Marquis 45'; Loft 72'; Trialist 82'; Brown 88'	Stadium: Oakfield Stadium; Attendance: 2,014

8 July 2023 Friendly	Eastleigh	0–2	Bristol Rovers	Eastleigh
13:30 BST			Sinclair 27'; Marquis 64'	Stadium: Ten Acres

11 July 2023 Friendly	Cardiff City	2–1	Bristol Rovers	Leckwith, Cardiff
15:00 BST	Robinson 46'; Tanner 64'	Report	Sinclair 13'	Stadium: Cardiff City Stadium; Attendance: 0 (Behind closed doors)
Note: Friendly played in the format of two sixty minute matches

15 July 2023 Friendly	Brentford B	0–1	Bristol Rovers	East Molesey
13:00 BST			Sinclair 45' (pen.)	Stadium: Imber Court

22 July 2023 Friendly	S.C. Braga	3–2	Bristol Rovers	Lagos, Portugal
10:00 WET	Castro 13'; Macedo 38'; Horta 90'		Collins 11'; Brown 32'	Stadium: Estádio Municipal de Lagos

25 July 2023 Friendly	Swansea City	0–2	Bristol Rovers	Swansea
19:00 BST		Report	Brown 76'; Marquis 90+1'	Stadium: Swansea.com Stadium

29 July 2023 Friendly	Bristol Rovers	2–0	Chesterfield	Horfield, Bristol
13:00 BST	Marquis 50', 69'			Stadium: Memorial Stadium; Attendance: 2,103

== Competitions ==
=== Overall record ===
Competition	Starting round	Final position	Record							
Competition	Starting round	Final position	Pld	W	D	L	GF	GA	GD	Win %
League One	Matchday 1		46	16	9	21	52	68	−16	34.78
FA Cup	First round		4	2	1	1	13	8	+5	50.00
EFL Cup	First round	First round	1	0	0	1	0	2	−2	0.00
EFL Trophy	Group stage		4	2	0	2	7	6	+1	50.00
Total			55	20	10	25	72	84	−12	36.36

Last updated: 27 April 2024
Source: Soccerway

=== League One ===
==== League table ====
Pos	Team	Pld	W	D	L	GF	GA	GD	Pts
12	Wigan Athletic	46	20	10	16	63	56	+7	62 (Note: On 19 May 2023, Wigan Athletic were deducted four points for failing to pay players and staff on time following previous EFL rules breaches in the 2022–23 season. Another four-point deduction was applied on 26 May, after the club's owners missed a deadline to deposit an amount equalling 125% of its monthly wage bill.)
13	Exeter City	46	17	10	19	46	61	−15	61
14	Northampton Town	46	17	9	20	57	66	−9	60
15	Bristol Rovers	46	16	9	21	52	68	−16	57
16	Charlton Athletic	46	11	20	15	64	65	−1	53
17	Reading	46	16	11	19	68	70	−2	53 (Note: On 16 August 2023, Reading were deducted one point for failing to pay players on time and in full on three occasions in the 2022–23 season. Another 3-point deduction was applied on 13 September, for failing to deposit wages on time. Another 2-point deduction was applied on 27 February, due to late HMRC payments.)
18	Cambridge United	46	12	12	22	39	61	−22	48

Source: EFL Official Website
Rules for classification: 1) Points; 2) Goal difference; 3) Number of goals scored; 4) Head-to-head results; 5) Wins; 6) Away goals; 7) Penalty points (sec 9.5); 8) 12-point sending off offences

==== Results summary ====
Overall								Home						Away					
Pld	W	D	L	GF	GA	GD	Pts	W	D	L	GF	GA	GD	W	D	L	GF	GA	GD
46	16	9	21	52	68	−16	57	8	6	9	27	29	−2	8	3	12	25	39	−14

Last updated: 27 April 2024.
Source: Soccerway

==== Results by round ====
Round	1	2	3	4	5	6	8	9	10	11	12	14	15	16	7^{1}	17	19	20	21	22	23	24	25	26	28	29	13^{2}	30	31	18^{3}	32	33	34	35	36	37	38	39	41	42	43	40^{5}	44	27^{4}	45	46
Ground	A	H	A	A	H	H	A	H	A	H	A	A	H	H	A	A	A	H	H	A	A	H	H	A	A	H	H	H	A	H	H	A	A	H	A	H	A	A	A	H	H	H	A	H	H	A
Result	D	D	W	L	L	D	W	W	L	W	L	L	D	W	D	W	L	D	D	W	L	W	W	L	L	L	L	W	W	L	L	W	L	W	W	L	D	L	L	D	L	L	W	W	L	L
Position	10	15	9	14	17	17	13	12	15	11	13	17	16	13	12	10	11	11	13	11	12	10	9	10	11	12	13	11	10	10	12	10	12	12	11	12	11	13	14	14	15	16	15	14	15	15

Updated to match(es) played on 27 April 2024. Source: Soccerway
A = Away; H = Home; W = Win; D = Draw; L = Loss; P = Postponed
Notes:
- ^{1} Matchday 7 (vs Reading) was postponed due to the international call-ups.
- ^{2} Matchday 13 (vs Exeter City) was postponed due to the international call-ups.
- ^{3} Matchday 18 (vs Fleetwood Town) was postponed due to the international call-ups.
- ^{4} Matchday 27 (vs Cambridge United) was postponed due to both Rovers and Cambridge still being involved in the FA Cup.
- ^{5} Matchday 40 (vs Reading) was postponed due to the international call-ups.

==== Matches ====
Win Draw Loss Fixtures

The league fixtures were released on 22 June 2023.

5 August 2023 1	Portsmouth	1–1	Bristol Rovers	Milton
15:00 BST	Morrell (yellow card) 16'; Lowery (yellow card) 17'; Towler (yellow card) 45+5'; Poole (yellow card) 64'; Yengi 90+2'	Report	Finley (yellow card) 9'; Thomas 24'; Wilson (yellow card) 35'; Hoole (yellow card) 42'	Stadium: Fratton Park; Attendance: 19,165; Referee: Sam Allison

12 August 2023 2	Bristol Rovers	1–1	Barnsley	Horfield
15:00 BST	Sinclair 81'	Report	Cadden 7'; Cotter (yellow card) 23'; Russell (yellow card) 63'; Kane (yellow card) 81'	Stadium: Memorial Stadium; Attendance: 7,929; Referee: Carl Brook

15 August 2023 3	Charlton Athletic	1–2	Bristol Rovers	Charlton
19:45 BST	Payne (yellow card) 57'; Kanu 73'	Report	Marquis (yellow card) 27'; Sinclair 58'; Grant (yellow card) 90+2'; McCormick 90+8'	Stadium: The Valley; Attendance: 12,756; Referee: Charles Breakspear

19 August 2023 4	Cambridge United	2–0	Bristol Rovers	Cambridge
15:00 BST	Okenabirhie 79'; Morrison (yellow card) 88'; Kaikai 90+6'	Report	Taylor (yellow card) 13'; Evans (yellow card) 45'; Hoole (yellow card) 70'	Stadium: The Abbey Stadium; Attendance: 6,390; Referee: John Busby

26 August 2023 5	Bristol Rovers	1–2	Wycombe Wanderers	Horfield
15:00 BST	Friend (yellow card) 34'; Wilson (yellow card) 67'; Vale 83'; Bogarde (yellow card) 88'	Report	Low 19'; McCleary 74'	Stadium: Memorial Stadium; Attendance: 7,951; Referee: Lee Swabey

2 September 2023 6	Bristol Rovers	1–1	Lincoln City	Horfield
15:00 BST	Finley (yellow card) 42'; Vale (yellow card) 84'; Grant 90+4'	Report	Mitchell (yellow card) 45+2'; Jackson 53'; Mandroiu (yellow card) 66'; Smith (yellow card) 71'	Stadium: Memorial Stadium; Attendance: 7,674; Referee: Lewis Smith

16 September 2023 8	Shrewsbury Town	0–2	Bristol Rovers	Shrewsbury
15:00 BST	Winchester (yellow card) 50'; Dunkley (yellow card) 69'	Report	Marquis (yellow card) 29' (goal) 73'; Evans (yellow card) 42'; Hunt (yellow card) 87'; Collins 90+1'	Stadium: New Meadow; Attendance: 6,070; Referee: Tom Reeves

23 September 2023 9	Bristol Rovers	4–1	Wigan Athletic	Horfield
15:00 BST	Thomas 13' (yellow card) 28'; Hunt 26'; Marquis (yellow card) 36' (goal) 68'; Collins 53'; Hoole (yellow card) 90+1'	Report	Wyke 21' (yellow card) 81'; Rekik (yellow card) 45+5'	Stadium: Memorial Stadium; Attendance: 8,161; Referee: Geoff Eltringham

30 September 2023 10	Peterborough United	2–0	Bristol Rovers	Peterborough
15:00 BST	Collins (yellow card) 15' (goal) 26'; Jones (yellow card) 32'; Ajiboye 47' (yellow card) 77'; Knight (yellow card) 54'; Kyprianou (yellow card) 62'	Report	Evans (yellow card) 56'; Taylor (yellow card) 74'	Stadium: Weston Homes Stadium; Attendance: 9,044; Referee: Ben Toner

3 October 2023 11	Bristol Rovers	3–0	Port Vale	Horfield
19:45 BST	McCormick 25'; Hunt 45+2'; Grant (yellow card) 47'; Brown 85'	Report	Debrah (yellow card) 18' (yellow-red card) 38'; Devine (yellow card) 42'	Stadium: Memorial Stadium; Attendance: 7,364; Referee: Ben Speedie

7 October 2023 12	Oxford United	2–1	Bristol Rovers	Littlemore
12:30 BST	Bodin 13'; Brannagan (yellow card) 15'; Moore (yellow card) 46'; Long 81'; Smyth (yellow card) 90' (yellow-red card) 90+5'; Mills (red card) 90+6'	Report	Martin (yellow card) 48'; Brown (yellow card) 57' (yellow-red card) 63'; Finley (yellow card) 78'; Collins 89'	Stadium: Kassam Stadium; Attendance: 9,439; Referee: Simon Mather

21 October 2023 14	Burton Albion	4–1	Bristol Rovers	Burton upon Trent
15:00 BST	Moon (yellow card) 18'; Lubala 26', 43'; Crocombe (yellow card) 70'; Powell 81'; Baah 84'; Helm (yellow card) 88'	Report	Evans 7'; Woods (red card) 64'; Bogarde (yellow card) 90+2'	Stadium: Pirelli Stadium; Attendance: 3,591; Referee: Christopher Pollard

24 October 2023 15	Bristol Rovers	1–1	Stevenage	Horfield
19:45 BST	Finley (yellow card) 37'; Evans (yellow card) 46'; Collins (yellow card) 57'; Martin 83'; Crama (yellow card) 84'; Taylor (yellow card) 88'; Gibbons (yellow card) 90+3'	Report	L. Thompson (yellow card) 33'; Reid 40'; Freeman (yellow card) 45+2'; James-Wildin (yellow card) 61'; Burns (yellow card) 73'	Stadium: Memorial Stadium; Attendance: 7,143; Referee: Matt Donohue

28 October 2023 16	Bristol Rovers	2–1	Northampton Town	Horfield
15:00 BST	Martin 10' (yellow card) 41'; Grant (yellow card) 12'; Evans (yellow card) 18' (goal) 30' (pen.)	Report	Pinnock (yellow card) 54'; Monthé 57'	Stadium: Memorial Stadium; Attendance: 8,518; Referee: Sunny Sukhvir Gill

7 November 2023 7	Reading	1–1	Bristol Rovers	Reading
20:00 GMT	Savage (yellow card) 25'; Smith 40'; Hutchinson (yellow card) 49'	Report	Martin 57'; Finley (yellow card) 82'; Craig (yellow card) 87'	Stadium: Select Car Leasing Stadium; Attendance: 11,726; Referee: Adam Herczeg
Note: Fixture was previously postponed due to international call-ups.

11 November 2023 17	Carlisle United	0–1	Bristol Rovers	Carlisle
15:00 GMT	Barclay (yellow card) 5'; Garner (yellow card) 14'; Gibson (yellow card) 90+1'; Moxon (yellow card) 90+5'	Report	Woods (yellow card) 14'; Lavelle 38' (o.g.); Friend (yellow card) 45+2'; Collins (yellow card) 51'; Crama (red card) 73'	Stadium: Brunton Park; Attendance: 7,838; Referee: Martin Woods

25 November 2023 19	Derby County	2–1	Bristol Rovers	Derby
15:00 GMT	Hunt 66' (o.g.); Mendez-Laing 90'	Report	Martin 87'	Stadium: Pride Park Stadium; Attendance: 26,623; Referee: Tom Reeves

28 November 2023 20	Bristol Rovers	1–1	Leyton Orient	Horfield
19:45 GMT	Ward 45+4'; Vale (yellow card) 90+2'	Report	Turns (yellow card) 45+3'; Sweeney (yellow card) 74'; Brown (yellow card) 90'; Crama 90+3' (o.g.)	Stadium: Memorial Stadium; Attendance: 7,048; Referee: Will Finnie

9 December 2023 21	Bristol Rovers	1–1	Cheltenham Town	Horfield
15:00 GMT	Hunt (yellow card) 45+4' (goal) 50'	Report	Goodwin 28'; Lloyd (yellow card) 59'; Freestone (yellow card) 78'; Butler-Oyedeji (yellow card) 90+1'	Stadium: Memorial Stadium; Attendance: 8,346; Referee: Craig Hicks

16 December 2023 22	Bolton Wanderers	1–2	Bristol Rovers	Horwich
15:00 GMT	Santos (red card) 33'; Forrester (yellow card) 45+2'; Baxter (yellow card) 45+5'; Dempsey (yellow card) 81'; Toal 84'; Williams (yellow card) 88'	Report	Marquis 10'; Finley (yellow card) 17'; Thomas (yellow card) 29'; Evans 41'; Taylor (yellow card) 87'	Stadium: Toughsheet Community Stadium; Attendance: 19,534; Referee: Carl Brook

23 December 2023 23	Blackpool	3–1	Bristol Rovers	Blackpool
15:00 GMT	Norburn 21'; Connolly (yellow card) 38'; Beesley 46'; Pennington (yellow card) 50'; Rhodes 82'	Report	Marquis 25'	Stadium: Bloomfield Road; Attendance: 10,076; Referee: Ross Joyce

26 December 2023 24	Bristol Rovers	2–1	Portsmouth	Horfield
15:00 GMT	Evans 66' (yellow card) 69'; Finley (yellow card) 80'; Cox (yellow card) 90+2'; Thomas 90+4'; Martin (yellow card) 90+7'	Report	Robertson (yellow card) 20'; Sparkes (yellow card) 48'; Morrell (yellow card) 65'; Raggett (yellow card) 69'; Lane 76' (yellow card) 78'; Kamara (yellow card) 90+7'	Stadium: Memorial Stadium; Attendance: 9,176; Referee: Scott Tallis

29 December 2023 25	Bristol Rovers	2–1	Charlton Athletic	Horfield
19:45 GMT	Martin 68', 90+4'	Report	Campbell (yellow card) 24'; Jones (yellow card) 30'; Hector (yellow card) 35'; Tedić 85'	Stadium: Memorial Stadium; Attendance: 9,143; Referee: Neil Hair

1 January 2024 26	Wycombe Wanderers	3–2	Bristol Rovers	High Wycombe
15:00 GMT	Low (yellow card) 9'; Tafazolli 29' (yellow card) 90'; Vokes (yellow card) 39' (goal) 78'; Scowen (red card) 62'; Leahy 80'; Wheeler (yellow card) 88'; Stryjek (yellow card) 90+1'; Grimmer (yellow card) 90+8'	Report	Martin 90+1', 90+8' (yellow card) 90+1'; Marquis (yellow card) 90+8'	Stadium: Adams Park; Attendance: 5,318; Referee: Leigh Doughty

13 January 2024 28	Barnsley	2–1	Bristol Rovers	Barnsley
15:00 GMT	McAtee (yellow card) 21'; Cole 43'; de Gevigney (yellow card) 67'; O'Keeffe 73'; Kane (yellow card) 79'	Report	Martin 68'; Evans (yellow card) 90+6'	Stadium: Oakwell; Attendance: 11,786; Referee: Scott Jackson

20 January 2024 29	Bristol Rovers	1–2	Blackpool	Horfield
15:00 GMT	Martin 24'; Crama (yellow card) 40'; Taylor (yellow card) 46'; Marquis (yellow card) 81'; Evans (yellow card) 83'; Collins (yellow card) 90+5'	Report	Hamilton 5'; Dembélé 19'; O'Donnell (yellow card) 50'; Lawrence-Gabriel (yellow card) 79'; Norburn (yellow card) 84'	Stadium: Memorial Stadium; Attendance: 8,013; Referee: Gavin Ward

23 January 2024 13	Bristol Rovers	0–1	Exeter City	Horfield
19:45 GMT	Evans (yellow card) 90+3'	Report	Cox 12'; Cole (yellow card) 77'; Wildschut (yellow card) 90+7'	Stadium: Memorial Stadium; Attendance: 8,543; Referee: Jacob Miles
Note: Fixture was previously scheduled for 14 October, but was postponed due to international call-ups.

27 January 2024 30	Bristol Rovers	3–1	Oxford United	Horfield
15:00 GMT	Martin 16'; Thomas 22'; Wilson (yellow card) 34'; Vale 77'	Report	Stevens (yellow card) 45+2'; Harris 58'	Stadium: Memorial Stadium; Attendance: 9,363; Referee: Ben Speedie

3 February 2024 31	Exeter City	0–1	Bristol Rovers	Exeter
15:00 GMT	Diabate (yellow card) 45'	Report	Aguilera 15'; Wilson (yellow card) 17'; Hunt (yellow card) 64'; Crama (yellow card) 80'	Stadium: St James Park; Attendance: 8,085; Referee: Will Finnie

6 February 2024 18	Bristol Rovers	0–2	Fleetwood Town	Horfield
19:45 GMT	Baggott (yellow card) 27'; Marquis (yellow card) 57'; Aguilera (yellow card) 67'; Martin (yellow card) 84' (yellow-red card) 90+3'	Report	Coughlan 20'; Stockley 52'; Campbell (yellow card) 57'; Kilkenny (yellow card) 66'; Broom (yellow card) 70'	Stadium: Memorial Stadium; Attendance: 7,385; Referee: Charles Breakspear
Note: Fixture was originally scheduled for 18 November, but was postponed due to international call-ups.

10 February 2024 32	Bristol Rovers	1–2	Burton Albion	Horfield
15:00 GMT	Evans 60'	Report	Gilligan 43' (yellow card) 52'; Bola (yellow card) 49'; Helm 57' (yellow card) 64'; Bennett (yellow card) 80'	Stadium: Memorial Stadium; Attendance: 7,855; Referee: Sam Purkiss

13 February 2024 33	Stevenage	2–3	Bristol Rovers	Stevenage
19:45 GMT	Hemmings 6'; Forster-Caskey 24'	Report	Evans (yellow card) 21' (goal) 67'; Thomas 29'; Martin 62'; Conteh (yellow card) 86' (yellow-red card) 90+5'	Stadium: Lamex Stadium; Attendance: 3,231; Referee: Sunny Sukhvir Gill

17 February 2024 34	Northampton Town	3–1	Bristol Rovers	Northampton
15:00 GMT	Brough 3' (yellow card) 52'; Pinnock 40'; Moulden (yellow card) 79'; Leonard 84'	Report	Wilson (yellow card) 24'; Martin 79'	Stadium: Sixfields Stadium; Attendance: 6,817; Referee: Adam Herczeg

24 February 2024 35	Bristol Rovers	2–1	Carlisle United	Horfield
15:00 GMT	Hunt (yellow card) 22'; Martin 34'; Thomas (yellow card) 50'; Sinclair 51'; Marquis (yellow card) 90+4'	Report	Vela 16'; Neal (yellow card) 56'; Armstrong (yellow card) 90+3'	Stadium: Memorial Stadium; Attendance: 8,679; Referee: Thomas Parsons

2 March 2024 36	Leyton Orient	0–1	Bristol Rovers	Leyton
15:00 GMT	Cooper (yellow card) 83'	Report	Martin 30'; Vale (yellow card) 58'; Wilson (red card) 83'; Finley (yellow card) 84'; Grant (yellow card) 84'	Stadium: Gaughan Group Stadium; Referee: Darren Drysdale

9 March 2024 37	Bristol Rovers	0–3	Derby County	Horfield
15:00 GMT	Conteh (yellow card) 34'; Martin (yellow card) 45+2'	Report	Adams (yellow card) 38'; Gayle 55' (yellow card) 68'; Barkhuizen 58'; Waghorn 89'	Stadium: Memorial Stadium; Attendance: 9,937; Referee: Lee Swabey

12 March 2024 38	Fleetwood Town	0–0	Bristol Rovers	Fleetwood
19:45 GMT	Rooney (yellow card) 84'; Broom (yellow card) 88'	Report	Hoole (yellow card) 79'; Finley (yellow card) 87'	Stadium: Highbury Stadium; Referee: Ross Joyce

16 March 2024 39	Lincoln City	5–0	Bristol Rovers	Lincoln
15:00 GMT	O'Connor 11'; Taylor 19', 23', 55'; Erhahon (yellow card) 45+4' (yellow-red card) 76'; Makama (yellow card) 65'; Roughan (yellow card) 71'; Hackett-Fairchild 81'	Report	Aguilera (yellow card) 85'	Stadium: LNER Stadium; Attendance: 9,392; Referee: Scott Simpson

29 March 2024 41	Port Vale	2–0	Bristol Rovers	Burslem
15:00 GMT	Garrity 42'; Dipepa 52'	Report	Hoole (yellow card) 34'; Wilson (yellow card) 58'	Stadium: Vale Park; Attendance: 6,637; Referee: Scott Oldham

1 April 2024 42	Bristol Rovers	0–0	Shrewsbury Town	Horfield
15:00 BST	Finley (yellow card) 7'	Report	Bayliss (yellow card) 15'; Dunkley (yellow card) 66'; Flanagan (yellow card) 89'	Stadium: Memorial Stadium; Attendance: 8,130; Referee: Elliot Bell

6 April 2024 43	Bristol Rovers	0–2	Bolton Wanderers	Horfield
15:00 BST	Evans (yellow card) 33'; Thomas (yellow card) 55'; Martin (yellow card) 56'; Connolly (yellow card) 62'; Conteh (yellow card) 76'; Taylor (yellow card) 90+8'	Report	Collins 52'; Iredale (yellow card) 55'; Baxter (yellow card) 85'; Morley 90+8' (pen.)	Stadium: Memorial Stadium; Attendance: 8,814; Referee: Carl Brook

9 April 2024 40	Bristol Rovers	0–2	Reading	Horfield
15:00 GMT	Hunt (yellow card) 90'; Conteh (yellow card) 90+2'	Report	Smith 8'; Wing 45'	Stadium: Memorial Stadium; Attendance: 7,951; Referee: Will Finnie
Note: Fixture was originally scheduled for 23 March, but was postponed due to international call-ups.

13 April 2024 44	Cheltenham Town	1–3	Bristol Rovers	Cheltenham
15:00 BST	Smith (yellow card) 7'; Shepherd (yellow card) 13'; Ferry (yellow card) 90+2'; Sercombe 90+4'	Report	Sinclair 12'; Aguilera 56'; Hunt (yellow card) 62'; Baggott 77'	Stadium: The Completely-Suzuki Stadium; Attendance: 5,501; Referee: Paul Howard

16 April 2024 27	Bristol Rovers	1–0	Cambridge United	Horfield
19:45 BST	Martin 87'	Report		Stadium: Memorial Stadium; Attendance: 6,526; Referee: Daniel Middleton
Note: Fixture was originally scheduled for 6 January, but was postponed due to Cambridge's FA Cup involvement.

20 April 2024 45	Bristol Rovers	0–2	Peterborough United	Horfield
15:00 BST	Thomas (yellow card) 45+2'; Hoole (yellow card) 69'	Report	Randall 41'; Knight (yellow card) 90'; Jones 90+5'	Stadium: Memorial Stadium; Attendance: 8,714; Referee: Tom Reeves

27 April 2024 46	Wigan Athletic	2–0	Bristol Rovers	Wigan
12:30 BST	Magennis 30'; Smith 48'	Report	McCormick (yellow card) 82'	Stadium: DW Stadium; Attendance: 14,077; Referee: Marc Edwards

=== FA Cup ===
Win Draw Loss Fixtures

The draw for the First Round was made on 15 October 2023.

4 November 2023 First round	Bristol Rovers	7–2	Whitby Town	Horfield
15:00 GMT	Marquis 5'; Thomas 18'; Brown 21'; Evans 40' (pen.); Beeden 66' (o.g.); Vale 70'; Collins 77'; Bogarde (yellow card) 90+2'	Report	Mondal 13'; Beeden (yellow card) 15'; Simpson 59' (yellow card) 73'; Gratton (yellow card) 73'	Stadium: Memorial Stadium; Attendance: 4,329; Referee: Ruebyn Ricardo

12 December 2023 Second round	Crewe Alexandra	2–4	Bristol Rovers	Crewe
19:45 GMT	Offord (yellow card) 40'; Baker-Richardson (yellow card) 55'; Nevitt 65'; Rowe 73'	Report	Marquis 18' (yellow card) 41'; Wilson 25'; Evans 42'; Cooney 49' (o.g.); Taylor (yellow card) 65'	Stadium: Gresty Road; Attendance: 3,127; Referee: Declan Bourne
Note: Fixture was originally scheduled for 2 December, but was postponed due to an unsafe frozen pitch.

6 January 2024 Third round	Norwich City	1–1	Bristol Rovers	Norwich
15:00 GMT	Barnes 12'	Report	Ward 17'	Stadium: Carrow Road; Attendance: 19,848; Referee: Lewis Smith

17 January 2024 Third round replay	Bristol Rovers	1–3	Norwich City	Horfield
19:45 GMT	McCormick 20'; Finley (yellow card) 43'	Report	Sara 53'; Idah 59' (pen.); Rowe (yellow card) 61'; McLean 87'; Barnes (yellow card) 90+7'	Stadium: Memorial Stadium; Attendance: 10,335; Referee: Andy Davies

=== EFL Cup ===
The draw for the First Round was made on 22 June 2023.

Win Draw Loss Fixtures

9 August 2023 First Round	Ipswich Town	2–0	Bristol Rovers	Ipswich
19:45 BST	Taylor 12'; Hutchinson (yellow card) 54'; Aluko 76'	Report		Stadium: Portman Road; Attendance: 15,047; Referee: David Rock

=== EFL Trophy ===
Win Draw Loss Fixtures

The draw for the group stage was made on 21 June 2023, with the invited club being drawn the following day. After finishing second in the group, they were drawn away to Crawley Town in the second round.

Pos	Div	Team	Pld	W	PW	PL	L	GF	GA	GD	Pts	Qualification
1	ACA	West Ham United U21	3	3	0	0	0	8	1	+7	9	Advance to Round 2
2	L1	Bristol Rovers	3	2	0	0	1	6	4	+2	6	Advance to Round 2
3	L2	Newport County	3	1	0	0	2	2	2	0	3	
4	L1	Cheltenham Town	3	0	0	0	3	1	10	−9	0	

Updated to match(es) played on 14 November 2023. Source: EFL.com

Win Draw Loss Fixtures

5 September 2023 Group stage	Bristol Rovers	4–1	Cheltenham Town	Horfield
19:45 BST	Gibbons 9'; Evans 27'; Collins 40'; McCormick (yellow card) 48'; Street 68' (o.g.)	Report	Gibbons 50' (o.g.); Adshead (yellow card) 63'; Willcox (yellow card) 72'; Chapman (yellow card) 84'	Stadium: Memorial Stadium; Attendance: 1,184; Referee: Daniel Middleton

19 September 2023 Group stage	Bristol Rovers	1–3	West Ham United U21	Horfield
19:45 BST	Finley 24'; Taylor (yellow card) 68'; Bogarde (yellow card) 90+8'	Report	Marshall 70' (pen.), 90+3'; Earthy 78'; Robinson (yellow card) 90+6'	Stadium: Memorial Stadium; Attendance: 978; Referee: Scott Tallis

14 November 2023 Group stage	Newport County	0–1	Bristol Rovers	Newport
19:45 GMT	McLoughlin (yellow card) 49'	Report	Gibbons (yellow card) 30'; Evans 37' (yellow card) 70'	Stadium: Rodney Parade; Attendance: 1,346; Referee: Farai Hallam

5 December 2023 Second round	Crawley Town	2–1	Bristol Rovers	Crawley
19:45 GMT	Johnson (yellow card) 44'; Roles 56'; Forster 69' (yellow card) 90+5'	Report	Thomas (yellow card) 30' (goal) 45'; Evans (yellow card) 50'; Taylor (yellow card) 76'; Gibbons (red card) 90+4'	Stadium: Broadfield Stadium; Attendance: 896; Referee: Alan Young

== Statistics ==
Players with squad numbers struck through and marked † left the club during the playing season.
Players with names in italics and marked * were on loan from another club for the whole of their season with Bristol Rovers.

As of match played 27 April 2024

No.	Pos	Nat	Player	Total		League One		FA Cup		League Cup		League Trophy	
No.	Pos	Nat	Player	Apps	Goals	Apps	Goals	Apps	Goals	Apps	Goals	Apps	Goals
~~1~~ †	GK	(England) ENG	James Belshaw	2	0	0+0	0	0+0	0	0+0	0	2+0	0
2	DF	(Wales) WAL	James Connolly	12	0	4+7	0	0+0	0	0+1	0	0+0	0
3	DF	(Scotland) SCO	Lewis Gordon	28	0	15+7	0	1+0	0	1+0	0	2+2	0
4	DF	(England) ENG	Josh Grant	36	1	16+13	1	2+1	0	0+1	0	2+1	0
5	DF	(Wales) WAL	James Wilson	31	1	25+1	0	1+1	1	0+0	0	3+0	0
6	MF	(England) ENG	Sam Finley	38	1	25+5	0	3+0	0	1+0	0	3+1	1
7	MF	(England) ENG	Scott Sinclair	35	4	16+11	4	1+2	0	1+0	0	1+3	0
8	MF	(England) ENG	Grant Ward	23	2	15+5	1	1+1	1	1+0	0	0+0	0
9	FW	(England) ENG	John Marquis	42	6	13+22	4	2+1	2	0+1	0	2+1	0
~~10~~ †	FW	(Wales) WAL	Aaron Collins	36	5	23+4	3	2+2	1	1+0	0	3+1	1
10	MF	(Costa Rica) CRC	Brandon Aguilera*	12	2	8+4	2	0+0	0	0+0	0	0+0	0
11	MF	(England) ENG	Luke Thomas	46	7	33+4	5	3+1	1	1+0	0	1+3	1
14	MF	(England) ENG	Jordan Rossiter	4	0	3+1	0	0+0	0	0+0	0	0+0	0
~~15~~ †	MF	(England) ENG	Ryan Woods*	15	0	7+4	0	1+0	0	0+0	0	1+2	0
17	DF	(England) ENG	Connor Taylor	41	0	30+3	0	4+0	0	1+0	0	2+1	0
~~18~~ †	FW	(England) ENG	Ryan Loft	3	0	0+3	0	0+0	0	0+0	0	0+0	0
18	FW	(Scotland) SCO	Chris Martin	38	16	28+6	16	2+1	0	0+0	0	0+1	0
19	MF	(England) ENG	Harvey Vale*	47	3	31+8	2	3+1	1	0+0	0	3+1	0
20	FW	(Jamaica) JAM	Jevani Brown	41	2	20+13	1	2+1	1	1+0	0	4+0	0
21	MF	(England) ENG	Antony Evans	52	10	37+6	6	4+0	2	0+1	0	3+1	2
~~22~~ †	MF	(Netherlands) NED	Lamare Bogarde*	18	0	8+6	0	1+0	0	0+0	0	1+2	0
22	MF	(Sierra Leone) SLE	Kamil Conteh	17	0	13+4	0	0+0	0	0+0	0	0+0	0
23	MF	(England) ENG	Luke McCormick	21	3	6+10	2	1+1	1	0+1	0	2+0	0
25	DF	(France) FRA	Tristan Crama*	34	0	22+5	0	4+0	0	1+0	0	0+2	0
26	DF	(Indonesia) IDN	Elkan Baggott*	14	1	12+2	1	0+0	0	0+0	0	0+0	0
30	DF	(Wales) WAL	Luca Hoole	25	0	14+9	0	0+0	0	1+0	0	1+0	0
31	GK	(England) ENG	Jed Ward	19	0	18+0	0	0+0	0	0+0	0	1+0	0
~~32~~ †	DF	(England) ENG	George Friend	12	0	10+2	0	0+0	0	0+0	0	0+0	0
33	GK	(England) ENG	Matthew Cox*	34	0	28+0	0	4+0	0	1+0	0	1+0	0
37	MF	(England) ENG	Kofi Shaw	1	0	0+1	0	0+0	0	0+0	0	0+0	0
42	DF	(England) ENG	Jack Hunt	26	3	20+4	3	1+1	0	0+0	0	0+0	0
43	FW	(Wales) WAL	Ollie Dewsbury	1	0	0+0	0	0+1	0	0+0	0	0+0	0
45	MF	(Republic of Ireland) IRL	Harry Vaughan*	11	0	1+10	0	0+0	0	0+0	0	0+0	0
Players out on loan:
28	DF	(England) ENG	James Gibbons	14	1	2+7	0	0+0	0	1+0	0	4+0	1

=== Goals Record ===
As of match played 16 April 2024

Rank	No.	Nat.	Po.	Name	League One	FA Cup	League Cup	League Trophy	Total
1	18	(Scotland)	CF	Chris Martin	16	0	0	0	16
2	21	(England)	AM	Antony Evans	6	2	0	2	10
3	11	(England)	RW	Luke Thomas	5	1	0	1	7
4	9	(England)	CF	John Marquis	4	2	0	0	6
5	10	(Wales)	CF	Aaron Collins	3	1	0	1	5
5	7	(England)	LW	Scott Sinclair	4	0	0	0	4
5	N/A			Own goals	1	2	0	1	4
8	19	(England)	AM	Harvey Vale	2	1	0	0	3
8	23	(England)	CM	Luke McCormick	2	1	0	0	3
8	42	(England)	RB	Jack Hunt	3	0	0	0	3
11	8	(England)	CM	Grant Ward	1	1	0	0	2
11	10	(Costa Rica)	AM	Brandon Aguilera	2	0	0	0	2
11	20	(Jamaica)	AM	Jevani Brown	1	1	0	0	2
14	4	(Jamaica)	LB	Josh Grant	1	0	0	0	1
14	5	(Wales)	CB	James Wilson	0	1	0	0	1
14	6	(England)	CM	Sam Finley	0	0	0	1	1
14	26	(Indonesia)	CB	Elkan Baggott	1	0	0	0	1
14	28	(England)	RB	James Gibbons	0	0	0	1	1
Total					52	13	0	7	72

=== Disciplinary record ===
As of match played 27 April 2024

Rank	No.	Nat.	Po.	Name	League One			FA Cup			League Cup			League Trophy			Total		
Rank	No.	Nat.	Po.	Name	Yellow card	(yellow card) (yellow-red card)	Red card	Yellow card	(yellow card) (yellow-red card)	Red card	Yellow card	(yellow card) (yellow-red card)	Red card	Yellow card	(yellow card) (yellow-red card)	Red card	Yellow card	(yellow card) (yellow-red card)	Red card
1	21	(England)	CM	Antony Evans	11	0	0	0	0	0	0	0	0	2	0	0	13	0	0
2	6	(England)	CM	Sam Finley	10	0	0	1	0	0	0	0	0	0	0	0	11	0	0
3	17	(England)	CB	Connor Taylor	6	0	0	1	0	0	0	0	0	2	0	0	9	0	0
4	9	(England)	CF	John Marquis	7	0	0	1	0	0	0	0	0	0	0	0	8	0	0
5	5	(Wales)	CB	James Wilson	6	0	1	0	0	0	0	0	0	0	0	0	6	0	1
5	18	(Scotland)	CF	Chris Martin	6	1	0	0	0	0	0	0	0	0	0	0	6	1	0
7	11	(England)	RW	Luke Thomas	5	0	0	0	0	0	0	0	0	1	0	0	6	0	0
7	30	(Wales)	RB	Luca Hoole	6	0	0	0	0	0	0	0	0	0	0	0	6	0	0
7	42	(England)	RB	Jack Hunt	6	0	0	0	0	0	0	0	0	0	0	0	6	0	0
10	4	(Jamaica)	LB	Josh Grant	4	0	0	0	0	0	0	0	0	0	0	0	4	0	0
10	22	(Netherlands)	DM	Lamare Bogarde	2	0	0	1	0	0	0	0	0	1	0	0	4	0	0
10	22	(Sierra Leone)	DM	Kamil Conteh	3	1	0	0	0	0	0	0	0	0	0	0	3	1	0
10	25	(France)	CB	Tristan Crama	3	0	1	0	0	0	0	0	0	0	0	0	3	0	1
16	10	(Wales)	CF	Aaron Collins	3	0	0	0	0	0	0	0	0	0	0	0	3	0	0
16	19	(England)	AM	Harvey Vale	3	0	0	0	0	0	0	0	0	0	0	0	3	0	0
16	28	(England)	RB	James Gibbons	1	0	0	0	0	0	0	0	0	1	0	1	2	0	1
17	10	(Costa Rica)	AM	Brandon Aguilera	2	0	0	0	0	0	0	0	0	0	0	0	2	0	0
17	15	(England)	CM	Ryan Woods	1	0	1	0	0	0	0	0	0	0	0	0	1	0	1
17	23	(England)	CM	Luke McCormick	1	0	0	0	0	0	0	0	0	1	0	0	2	0	0
17	32	(England)	LB	George Friend	2	0	0	0	0	0	0	0	0	0	0	0	2	0	0
21	2	(Wales)	CB	James Connolly	1	0	0	0	0	0	0	0	0	0	0	0	1	0	0
21	20	(Jamaica)	AM	Jevani Brown	0	1	0	0	0	0	0	0	0	0	0	0	0	1	0
21	26	(Indonesia)	CB	Elkan Baggott	1	0	0	0	0	0	0	0	0	0	0	0	1	0	0
21	33	(England)	GK	Matthew Cox	1	0	0	0	0	0	0	0	0	0	0	0	1	0	0
Total					90	3	3	4	0	0	0	0	0	8	0	1	102	3	4
