= 1990–91 Bristol Rovers F.C. season =

Bristol Rovers
1990–91 season
- Chairman: Geoff Dunford
- Manager: Gerry Francis
- Football League Second Division: 13th W:15 D:13 L:18 F:56 A:59
- FA Cup: Third Round
- Rumbelows Cup: First Round
- Zenith Data Systems Cup: Southern Second Round
- Top goalscorer: League: Carl Saunders (16); All: Carl Saunders (17)
- Highest home attendance: 7,932 (vs West Ham United, 1 January 1991)
- Lowest home attendance: 4,563 (vs Barnsley, 7 November 1990)

Bristol Rovers F.C. spent the 1990–91 season in the Football League Second Division.

== League table ==
Pos	Team	Pld	W	D	L	GF	GA	GD	Pts
11	Newcastle United	46	14	17	15	49	56	−7	59
12	Wolverhampton Wanderers	46	13	19	14	63	63	0	58
13	Bristol Rovers	46	15	13	18	56	59	−3	58
14	Ipswich Town	46	13	18	15	60	68	−8	57
15	Port Vale	46	15	12	19	56	64	−8	57

Rules for classification: 1) Points; 2) Goal difference; 3) Goals scored
