= Connor Jones =

Connor Jones is the name of:

- Connor Jones (baseball) (born 1994), American baseball player
- Connor Jones (footballer) (born 1998), English footballer
- Connor Jones (ice hockey) (born 1990), Canadian ice hockey player
