= Chris Hargreaves =

English footballer

Personal information
- Full name: Christian Hargreaves
- Date of birth: 12 May 1972 (age 54)
- Place of birth: Cleethorpes, England
- Positions: Striker; midfielder

Youth career
- Grimsby Town
- Everton
- Grimsby Town

Senior career*
Years	Team	Apps	(Gls)
1989–1993	Grimsby Town	51	(5)
1993	→ Scarborough (loan)	3	(0)
1993–1995	Hull City	49	(0)
1995–1996	West Bromwich Albion	1	(0)
1996	→ Hereford United (loan)	17	(2)
1996–1998	Hereford United	82	(8)
1998–2000	Plymouth Argyle	76	(5)
2000–2004	Northampton Town	151	(6)
2004–2005	Brentford	30	(2)
2005–2007	Oxford United	73	(6)
2007–2010	Torquay United	105	(10)
2010	Oxford United	11	(0)
Total		646	(43)

Managerial career
- 2014–2015: Torquay United
- 2022: Yeovil Town
- * Club domestic league appearances and goals

Christian Hargreaves (born 12 May 1972) is an English football manager, former footballer and pundit.

As a player he was a forward and midfielder who played for Grimsby Town, Scarborough, Hull City, West Bromwich Albion, Hereford United, Plymouth Argyle, Northampton Town, Brentford, Oxford United and Torquay United

He subsequently managed Torquay United from January 2014 until June 2015, and Yeovil Town from May until October 2022.

== Playing career ==
Hargreaves began as a youth team player at Everton but came back to his home town club Grimsby Town as a trainee with June 1988, turning professional in December 1989. He had a loan spell with Scarborough in March 1993, before leaving Grimsby to join Hull City in July 1993 for a fee of £50,000.

He moved to West Bromwich Albion on a free transfer in July 1995, but made just two first team appearances for the Baggies (both as a substitute). He joined Hereford United on loan in February 1996 until the end of the season when he moved to Hereford on a free transfer. His next move was in July 1998 when he joined Plymouth Argyle on a free transfer. He was a regular in the Argyle side, leaving to join Northampton Town on a free transfer in June 2000. He was Northampton's player of the year in the 2001–02 season, signing a new two-year contract in July 2002.

Hargreaves made over 150 league appearances for Northampton, leaving to join Brentford in June 2004. Hargreaves joined Oxford United on free transfer in July 2005, remaining with Oxford after their relegation to the Conference in 2006. He was released by Oxford in May 2007, signing for newly relegated Torquay United the following month. On 17 May 2009, he scored Torquay's first goal as he captained them in a 2–0 victory over Cambridge United in the Conference National play-off final at Wembley. The victory earned them promotion to the Football League.

In January 2010 Hargreaves completed a return to Oxford United, where he won promotion out of the Conference for the second successive season.

== Managerial career ==
On 6 January 2014, Hargreaves was appointed as Torquay United manager. Hargreaves was unable to keep Torquay in the Football League despite an upturn in form and performances. He was placed on gardening leave on 14 June 2015 after rejecting a pay cut. In September 2016, Hargreaves was appointed under-21 coach at Bristol Rovers. Hargreaves left his role with Rovers by mutual consent in February 2022 having seen a number of his Development Squad players progress into the first team picture including Alfie Kilgour, Luca Hoole and Jed Ward.

On 18 May 2022, Hargreaves was appointed as manager of National League club Yeovil Town, signing a two-year contract. Following a poor start to the season, Hargreaves was sacked on 27 October 2022 with the club sitting in the relegation zone, one point from safety.

== Personal life ==
Hargreaves was born in Cleethorpes, Lincolnshire, and went to school at Lindsey School in Cleethorpes. His son Cameron is a professional footballer.

== Managerial statistics ==
As of match played 25 October 2022

Managerial record by team and tenure
Team	From	To	Record					Ref
Team	From	To	P	W	D	L	Win %	Ref
Torquay United	6 January 2014	14 June 2015	74	27	14	33	36.5	
Yeovil Town	18 May 2022	27 October 2022	17	2	8	7	11.8	
Total			91	29	22	40	31.9	—
