= 2021–22 Bristol Rovers F.C. season =

Bristol Rovers
2021–22 season
- Owner: Wael al-Qadi
- Manager: Joey Barton
- Stadium: Memorial Stadium
- League Two: 3rd (promoted)
- FA Cup: Third round
- EFL Cup: First round
- EFL Trophy: Group stage
- Top goalscorer: League: Aaron Collins (16); All: Aaron Collins (18)
- Highest home attendance: 9,790 vs. Scunthorpe United (7 May 2022)
- Lowest home attendance: 889 vs. Cheltenham Town (31 August 2021, EFL Trophy Group Stage)
- Average home league attendance: 7,512
Home colours	Away colours	Third colours

The 2021–22 season is Bristol Rovers' 139th year in their history and first season back in League Two since the 2015–16 season, following relegation the previous season. Along with the league, the club also competed in the FA Cup, the EFL Cup and the EFL Trophy. The season covers the period from 1 July 2021 to 30 June 2022.

== Transfers ==
=== Transfers in ===
Date	Position	Nationality	Name	From	Fee	Ref.
1 July 2021	LB	(England)	Nick Anderton	(England) Carlisle United	Free transfer	
1 July 2021	CF	(Wales)	Aaron Collins	(England) Forest Green Rovers	Free transfer	
1 July 2021	CM	(Scotland)	Paul Coutts	(England) Fleetwood Town	Free transfer	
1 July 2021	CM	(England)	Sam Finley	(England) Fleetwood Town	Free transfer	
1 July 2021	CB	(England)	Mark Hughes	(England) Accrington Stanley	Free transfer	
1 July 2021	CF	(England)	Harvey Saunders	(England) Fleetwood Town	Free transfer	
9 July 2021	LB	(Republic of Ireland)	Trevor Clarke	(England) Rotherham United	Undisclosed fee	
13 July 2021	RW	(England)	Harry Anderson	(England) Lincoln City	Free transfer	
23 July 2021	GK	(England)	James Belshaw	(England) Harrogate Town	Undisclosed fee	
30 July 2021	CF	(Jersey)	Brett Pitman	(England) Swindon Town	Free transfer	
31 August 2021	LB	(England)	Junior Brown	(England) Scunthorpe United	Free transfer	
31 August 2021	CF	(England)	Leon Clarke	(England) Shrewsbury Town	Free transfer	
31 August 2021	AM	(England)	Antony Evans	(Germany) SC Paderborn	Free transfer	
4 September 2021	CM	(Republic of Ireland)	Glenn Whelan	(England) Fleetwood Town	Free transfer	
4 January 2022	CF	(England)	Ryan Loft	(England) Scunthorpe United	Undisclosed	
1 February 2022	CM	(England)	Jon Nolan	(England) Ipswich Town	Free transfer	

=== Loans in ===
Date from	Position	Nationality	Name	From	Date until	Ref.
17 June 2021	CB	(England)	Connor Taylor	(England) Stoke City	End of season	
9 July 2021	AM	(Wales)	Sion Spence	(England) Crystal Palace	End of season	
10 July 2021	AM	(England)	Luke Thomas	(England) Barnsley	End of season	
8 January 2022	CB	(England)	James Connolly	(Wales) Cardiff City	End of season	
31 January 2022	AM	(Scotland)	Elliot Anderson	(England) Newcastle United	End of season	

=== Loans out ===
Date from	Position	Nationality	Name	To	Date until	Ref.
27 August 2021	CM	(England)	Ben Liddle	(Scotland) Queen of the South	End of Season	
8 September 2021	RW	(England)	Zain Walker	(England) King's Lynn Town	October 2021	
9 September 2021	AM	(England)	Owen Brain	(England) Yate Town	November 2021	
9 September 2021	CB	(Republic of Ireland)	Jamie Egan	(England) Yate Town	November 2021	
9 September 2021	RB	(England)	Tyron Mbuenimo	(England) Yate Town	November 2021	
10 September 2021	CF	(England)	Kieran Phillips	(England) Dorchester Town	October 2021	
11 September 2021	CF	(England)	Ollie Hulbert	(England) Hereford	October 2021	
30 September 2021	CM	(Wales)	Joe Budd	(England) Hendon	November 2021	
1 October 2021	CM	(England)	Lucas Tomlinson	(England) Gloucester City	End of Season	
8 October 2021	RW	(England)	Kinsly Murray	(England) Cirencester Town	November 2021	
21 October 2021	CF	(England)	Ollie Hulbert	(England) Gloucester City	End of Season	
26 October 2021	CM	(England)	Tom Mehew	(England) Bath City	November 2021	
28 October 2021	CF	(England)	Kieran Phillips	(England) Swindon Supermarine	End of Season	
3 November 2021	CB	(England)	Niall Lovelock	(England) Cirencester Town	December 2021	
9 November 2021	CM	(Wales)	Joe Budd	(England) Taunton Town	December 2021	
12 November 2021	CM	(England)	Cameron Hargreaves	(England) Chippenham Town	December 2021	
12 November 2021	RW	(England)	Zain Walker	(England) Chippenham Town	December 2021	
19 November 2021	CF	(England)	Harvey Greenslade	(England) Cinderford Town	December 2021	
23 November 2021	RB	(England)	Zak Ford	(England) Swindon Supermarine	December 2021	
10 December 2021	CM	(England)	Tom Mehew	(England) Gloucester City	January 2022	
11 January 2022	CM	(England)	Tom Mehew	(England) Swindon Supermarine	March 2022	
15 January 2022	CB	(Republic of Ireland)	Jamie Egan	(England) Hereford	March 2022	
17 January 2022	CM	(England)	Zain Westbrooke	(England) Stevenage	End of season	
21 January 2022	GK	(England)	Jed Ward	(England) Swindon Supermarine	February 2022	
3 February 2022	CF	(Jersey)	Brett Pitman	(England) Eastleigh	End of season	
5 February 2022	CM	(England)	Cameron Hargreaves	(England) King's Lynn Town	March 2022	
14 February 2022	CF	(England)	Harvey Greenslade	(England) Tiverton Town	March 2022	
17 February 2022	GK	(England)	Jed Ward	(England) Prescot Cables	March 2022	
18 February 2022	LW	(England)	Ryan Jones	(England) Bath City	End of season	
4 March 2022	CB	(Wales)	Pablo Martinez	(England) Gloucester City	April 2022	
4 March 2022	LB	(England)	Sam Heal	(England) Salisbury	End of season	
25 March 2022	CM	(England)	Tom Mehew	(England) Chippenham Town	End of season	

=== Transfers out ===
Date	Position	Nationality	Name	To	Fee	Ref.
2 June 2021	CF	(England)	James Daly	(England) Stevenage	Free transfer	
15 June 2021	CB	(Germany)	Max Ehmer	(England) Gillingham	Contract terminated	
18 June 2021	LB	(Democratic Republic of the Congo)	David Tutonda	(England) Gillingham	Contract terminated	
25 June 2021	RB	(England)	George Williams	(England) Cambridge United	Free transfer	
30 June 2021	GK	(France)	Alexis André Jr.	(England) Folkestone Invicta	Released	
30 June 2021	GK	(England)	Liam Armstrong	(England) Gloucester City	Released	
30 June 2021	LW	(England)	Kyle Bennett	(England) AFC Telford United	Released	
30 June 2021	CB	(England)	Tom Davies	(England) Tranmere Rovers	Released	
30 June 2021	RB	(England)	Josh Hare	(England) Eastleigh	Released	
30 June 2021	LB	(Scotland)	Michael Kelly	(England) Eastleigh	Released	
30 June 2021	LB	(England)	Ali Koiki	(England) Northampton Town	Released	
30 June 2021	LB	(England)	Luke Leahy	(England) Shrewsbury Town	Released	
30 June 2021	RB	(England)	Mark Little	(England) Yeovil Town	Released	
30 June 2021	CM	(England)	Abu Ogogo	(England) Southend United	Released	
30 June 2021	CM	(England)	Ed Upson	(Wales) Newport County	Released	
30 June 2021	GK	(Netherlands)	Jordi van Stappershoef	(Netherlands) Jong AZ	Released	
30 June 2021	CF	(England)	Harry Warwick	(England) Chippenham Town	Released	
26 July 2021	CF	(Kenya)	Jonah Ayunga	(England) Morecambe	Undisclosed fee	
25 August 2021	CB	(England)	Jack Baldwin	(Scotland) Ross County	Contract terminated	
26 August 2021	CF	(England)	Brandon Hanlan	(England) Wycombe Wanderers	Undisclosed fee	
1 September 2021	AM	(Republic of Ireland)	Josh Barrett	(England) King's Lynn Town	Contract terminated	
6 January 2022	CB	(England)	Mark Hughes	Retired	—N/a	
19 January 2022	RW	(England)	Zain Walker	(England) King's Lynn Town	Undisclosed fee	

== Pre-season friendlies ==
Bristol Rovers announced they would play friendlies against Melksham Town and Havant & Waterlooville as part of their pre-season preparations. On 28 June 2021, the club announced three home friendlies.

2 July 2021 Friendly	Melksham Town	1–1	Bristol Rovers	Melksham
19:45 BST	Anderton 18' (o.g.)	Report	Collins 19'	Stadium: Oakfield Stadium

10 July 2021 Friendly	Barnet	3–0	Bristol Rovers	Canons Park
	Bloomfield 11'; Turley 35'; Trialist	Report		Stadium: The Hive Stadium; Attendance: 0

17 July 2021 Friendly	Bristol Rovers	1–1	Plymouth Argyle	Horfield
13:00 BST	Collins 47' (pen.)	Report	Jephcott 34' (pen.)	Stadium: Memorial Stadium

24 July 2021 Friendly	Bristol Rovers	Cancelled	Swansea City	Horfield
15:00 BST		Report		Stadium: Memorial Stadium
Note: Cancelled on day of the match following positive COVID-19 cases in the Swansea City squad.

27 July 2021 Friendly	Bristol Rovers	0–0	Havant & Waterlooville	Horfield
19:00 BST		Report		Stadium: Memorial Stadium

31 July 2021 Friendly	Bristol Rovers	3–2	Oxford United	Horfield
13:00 BST	Thomas 45+1' (pen.); Pitman 78', 88'	Report	Seddon 14'; Henry 47'	Stadium: Memorial Stadium

== Competitions ==
=== League Two ===
==== League table ====
Pos	Team	Pld	W	D	L	GF	GA	GD	Pts	Promotion, qualification or relegation
1	Forest Green Rovers (C, P)	46	23	15	8	75	44	+31	84	Promotion to EFL League One
2	Exeter City (P)	46	23	15	8	65	41	+24	84	Promotion to EFL League One
3	Bristol Rovers (P)	46	23	11	12	71	49	+22	80	Promotion to EFL League One
4	Northampton Town	46	23	11	12	60	38	+22	80	Qualification for League Two play-offs
5	Port Vale (O, P)	46	22	12	12	67	46	+21	78	Qualification for League Two play-offs
6	Swindon Town	46	22	11	13	77	54	+23	77	Qualification for League Two play-offs

Source: EFL Official Website
Rules for classification: 1) Points; 2) Goal difference; 3) Number of goals scored; 4) Head-to-head results; 5) Wins; 6) Away goals; 7) Penalty points (sec 9.5); 8) 12-point sending off offences
(C) Champions; (O) Play-off winners; (P) Promoted

==== Results summary ====
Overall								Home						Away					
Pld	W	D	L	GF	GA	GD	Pts	W	D	L	GF	GA	GD	W	D	L	GF	GA	GD
46	23	11	12	71	49	+22	80	14	4	5	38	20	+18	9	7	7	33	29	+4

Last updated: 7 May 2022.

==== Results by matchday ====
Matchday	1	2	3	4	5	6	7	8	9	10	11	12	13	14	15	16	17	18	19	20	21	22	23	24	25	26	27	28	29	30	31	32	33	34	35	36	37	38	39	40	41	42	43	44	45	46
Ground	A	H	H	A	A	H	A	H	A	H	H	A	A	H	A	H	H	A	A	H	H	H	A	A	H	A	A	H	H	A	A	H	H	A	A	H	H	A	A	H	A	H	A	H	A	H
Result	L	L	W	L	D	W	L	L	W	L	W	D	D	L	W	W	D	D	L	L	W	W	D	W	W	D	L	D	W	W	W	D	W	L	W	W	W	W	L	W	D	W	W	D	W	W
Position	17	23	15	20	22	16	21	22	18	20	16	16	17	18	16	14	14	14	16	16	15	16	15	13	12	13	14	14	11	11	9	10	9	9	9	8	7	4	6	5	6	5	5	5	4	3

Updated to match(es) played on 30 April 2022. Source: Statto.com
A = Away; H = Home; W = Win; D = Draw; L = Loss

==== Matches ====
Fixtures for the 2021–22 season were announced on 24 June 2021.

7 August 2021 1	Mansfield Town	2–1	Bristol Rovers	Mansfield
15:00 BST	Maris (yellow card) 23'; Hawkins 42'; Johnson (yellow card) 79', (goal) 90+6' (pen.)	Report	Harries 62', (yellow card) 78'; Coutts (red card) 77'; Westbrooke (yellow card) 86'	Stadium: One Call Stadium; Attendance: 6,342; Referee: Josh Smith

14 August 2021 2	Bristol Rovers	0–2	Stevenage	Horfield
15:00 BST	Harries (yellow card) 50'	Report	Vancooten (yellow card) 52'; Lines 88'; Norris 90+6'	Stadium: Memorial Stadium; Attendance: 7,071; Referee: Neil Hair

17 August 2021 3	Bristol Rovers	1–0	Oldham Athletic	Horfield
19:45 BST	Saunders (yellow card) 22' (goal) 35'; Pitman (yellow card) 90+1'	Report	Whelan (yellow card) 6'; Diarra (yellow card) 47'; Cissé (yellow card) 73'	Stadium: Memorial Stadium; Attendance: 6,005; Referee: Sam Purkiss

21 August 2021 4	Exeter City	4–1	Bristol Rovers	Exeter
15:00 BST	Jay 3', 15'; Dieng 22'; Kite 24'; Edwards (yellow card) 87'	Report	Baldwin (yellow card) 24'; Finley (yellow card) 59', (goal) 70'	Stadium: St James Park; Attendance: 5,284; Referee: Christopher Sarginson

28 August 2021 5	Barrow	1–1	Bristol Rovers	Barrow-in-Furness
15:00 BST	Hutton (yellow card) 17'; Ellis (red card) 31'; White (yellow card) 34'; Banks (yellow card) 42' (goal) 45+5'; Zanzala (yellow card) 68'	Report	Nicholson 44'; Collins (yellow card) 55'; Finley (yellow card) 90'	Stadium: Holker Street; Attendance: 2,116; Referee: Ross Joyce

4 September 2021 6	Bristol Rovers	1–0	Crawley Town	Horfield
15:00 BST	Clarke 47'	Report	Tsaroulla (yellow card) 67'	Stadium: Memorial Stadium; Attendance: 6,513; Referee: Ben Speedie

11 September 2021 7	Hartlepool United	1–0	Bristol Rovers	Hartlepool
15:00 BST	Byrne (yellow card) 11'; Sterry 69' (yellow card) 88'	Report	Finley (yellow card) 87'	Stadium: Victoria Park; Attendance: 5,193; Referee: Rebecca Welch

18 September 2021 8	Bristol Rovers	1–3	Leyton Orient	Horfield
15:00 BST	Finley (yellow card) 28'; Kilgour (yellow card) 45+1'; Pitman 90+2' (pen.)	Report	Smith 17'; Archibald 33' (yellow card) 69'; Drinan 41'; Mitchell (yellow card) 47'; Clay (yellow card) 80'; Vigouroroux (yellow card) 83'	Stadium: Memorial Stadium; Attendance: 6,172; Referee: David Rock

25 September 2021 9	Walsall	1–2	Bristol Rovers	Bescot
15:00 BST	Earing (yellow card) 26'; Phillips 32'; White (yellow card) 85'	Report	Taylor (yellow card) 57', (goal) 79'; Harries (yellow card) 66'; Spence 90+1'	Stadium: Banks's Stadium; Attendance: 5,434; Referee: Seb Stockbridge

2 October 2021 10	Bristol Rovers	1–3	Swindon Town	Horfield
15:00 BST	Anderson 17'; Kilgour (yellow card) 79' (yellow-red card) 84'; Harries (yellow card) 90+4'	Report	Payne 57'; Gladwin 85' (pen.); McKirdy 87'	Stadium: Memorial Stadium; Attendance: 7,625; Referee: Robert Lewis

9 October 2021 11	Bristol Rovers	3–0	Carlisle United	Horfield
15:00 BST	Harries (yellow card) 23'; Evans 35'; Saunders (yellow card) 76', (goal) 90+4'; Nicholson 86'; Thomas (yellow card) 88'; Whelan (yellow card) 90'	Report	Feeney (yellow card) 16'; Devine (yellow card) 26'; Alessandra (yellow card) 38'; Armer (yellow card) 60'; Guy (yellow card) 61'; Mellish (yellow card) 74'	Stadium: The Memorial Stadium; Attendance: 6,302; Referee: Charles Breakspear

16 October 2021 12	Bradford City	2–2	Bristol Rovers	Bradford
15:00 BST	Vernam 42'; Cook 50'	Report	Saunders (yellow card) 4'; Coutts (yellow card) 25'; Kilgour 48', (yellow card) 54'; Pitman (yellow card) 63', (goal) 90+1'	Stadium: Utilita Energy Stadium; Attendance: 16,664; Referee: Andy Haines

19 October 2021 13	Colchester United	1–1	Bristol Rovers	Colchester
19:45 BST	Sarpong-Wiredu (yellow card) 36'; Chambers (yellow card) 45+1'; Dobra (yellow card) 63'; Eastman (yellow card) 65'; Chilvers 88'; Tchamadeu (red card) 90+1'	Report	Harries (yellow card) 51' (yellow-red card) 87'; Pitman 59'; Coutts (yellow card) 88'; Clarke (red card) 90+1'	Stadium: Colchester Community Stadium; Attendance: 2,069; Referee: Graham Scott

23 October 2021 14	Bristol Rovers	1–3	Newport County	Horfield
15:00 BST	Pitman 45+2'; Finley (yellow card) 86'	Report	Baker-Richardson 27' (yellow card) 86'; Telford 31', 61'; Willmott (yellow card) 72'; Abraham (yellow card) 90+2'	Stadium: Memorial Stadium; Attendance: 7,515; Referee: Scott Oldham

30 October 2021 15	Harrogate Town	0–1	Bristol Rovers	Harrogate
15:00 BST	Smith (yellow card) 13'; Martin (yellow card) 90+6'	Report	Whelan (yellow card) 22'; Brown (yellow card) 35'; Evans (yellow card) 57'; Anderton 64'; Coutts (yellow card) 89'	Stadium: EnviroVent Stadium; Attendance: 2,614; Referee: Peter Wright

13 November 2021 16	Bristol Rovers	2–1	Northampton Town	Horfield
15:00 GMT	Whelan (yellow card) 12' (yellow-red card) 67'; Harries (yellow card) 49'; Grant 54'; Evans 59'; Anderson (yellow card) 74'	Report	Hoskins 39' (pen.) (yellow card) 74'; Roberts (yellow card) 90+5'	Stadium: Memorial Stadium; Attendance: 6,884; Referee: Sam Allison

20 November 2021 17	Bristol Rovers	2–2	Tranmere Rovers	Horfield
15:00 GMT	Grant 5'; Nicholson 22'; Kilgour (yellow card) 32'; Evans (yellow card) 63'	Report	Macdonald 25' (yellow card) 32'; Knight-Percival (yellow card) 36'; Davies (yellow card) 45+3'; Glatzel 75'	Stadium: Memorial Stadium; Attendance: 7,165; Referee: Tom Reeves

23 November 2021 18	Salford City	1–1	Bristol Rovers	Salford
19:45 GMT	Thomas-Asante (yellow card) 39' (goal) 90+5'; Willock (red card) 41'; Love (yellow card) 48'; Elliott (yellow card) 80'; Hunter (red card) 89'	Report	Nicholson 14'; Anderton (yellow card) 33'	Stadium: Moor Lane; Attendance: 1,740; Referee: Ben Toner

27 November 2021 19	Forest Green Rovers	2–0	Bristol Rovers	Nailsworth
15:00 GMT	Matt 20', 77' (pen.) (yellow card) 81'; Godwin-Malife (yellow card) 41' (yellow-red card) 63'	Report	Anderton (yellow card) 28'; Evans (yellow card) 79'; Finley (yellow card) 80'	Stadium: The New Lawn; Attendance: 4,128; Referee: Simon Mather

7 December 2021 20	Bristol Rovers	1–2	Port Vale	Horfield
19:45 GMT	Finley (red card) 15'; Collins 56'; Harries (red card) 77'; Whelan (yellow card) 86'; Pitman (yellow card) 90+5'	Report	Garrity 31', 33'; Jones (yellow card) 58'; Politic (yellow card) 60'	Stadium: Memorial Stadium; Attendance: 6,071; Referee: Craig Hicks

11 December 2021 21	Bristol Rovers	4–2	Rochdale	Horfield
15:00 GMT	Evans 10'; Collins 51', 89'; Anderson 84'	Report	Beesley 60', 66' (yellow card) 64'	Stadium: Memorial Stadium; Attendance: 6,215; Referee: James Linington

15 January 2022 22	Bristol Rovers	2–0	Hartlepool United	Horfield
15:00 GMT	Harries (yellow card) 28'; Evans (yellow card) 70' (goal) 90+4'; Collins 87'	Report	Liddle (yellow card) 39'; Ferguson (yellow card) 64'; Odusina (yellow card) 76'; Byrne (yellow card) 80'; Sterry (red card) 90+3'	Stadium: Memorial Stadium; Attendance: 7,004; Referee: Carl Brook

22 January 2022 23	Swindon Town	1–1	Bristol Rovers	Swindon
13:00 GMT	Simpson 16'; Iandolo (yellow card) 57'	Report	Taylor (yellow card) 25'; Finley (yellow card) 32' (goal) 35'; Loft (yellow card) 40'; Coutts (yellow card) 74'; Grant (yellow card) 90+4'; Hoole (yellow card) 90+6'	Stadium: County Ground; Attendance: 12,695; Referee: Tom Nield

25 January 2022 24	Scunthorpe United	2–3	Bristol Rovers	Scunthorpe
19:45 GMT	Wood (yellow card) 1'; Burns 89', 90+3'	Report	Grant (yellow card) 32' (goal) 36'; Evans 62' (pen.); Clarke 78'	Stadium: Glanford Park; Attendance: Anthony Backhouse; Referee: 2,403

29 January 2022 25	Bristol Rovers	1–0	Walsall	Horfield
15:00 GMT	Hoole (yellow card) 34' (yellow-red card) 38'; Coutts (yellow card) 57'; Collins 90'	Report	White (yellow card) 5'; Wilkinson (yellow card) 34'; Labadie (yellow card) 60'; Kiernan (yellow card) 63'; Osadebe (yellow card) 90+8'	Stadium: Memorial Stadium; Attendance: 8,003; Referee: Keith Stroud

5 February 2022 26	Sutton United	1–1	Bristol Rovers	Sutton
15:00 GMT	Kizzi (yellow card) 7'; Bennett 19'; Bouzanis (yellow card) 31'; Davis (yellow card) 51'; Milsom (yellow card) 90+3'	Report	Connolly (yellow card) 18'; Evans 85' (pen.)	Stadium: Gander Green Lane; Attendance: 3,394; Referee: Bobby Madley

8 February 2022 27	Oldham Athletic	2–1	Bristol Rovers	Oldham
19:45 GMT	Keillor-Dunn 1', 31'; Clarke (yellow card) 88'	Report	Nicholson 43'; Anderton (yellow card) 52'; Coutts (yellow card) 64'	Stadium: Boundary Park; Attendance: 5,147; Referee: Scott Oldham

12 February 2022 28	Bristol Rovers	0–0	Mansfield Town	Horfield
15:00 GMT	Finley (yellow card) 33'; Collins (yellow card) 64'	Report	Quinn (yellow card) 53'; O'Toole (yellow card) 89'; Longstaff (yellow card) 90+3'	Stadium: Memorial Stadium; Attendance: 7,707; Referee: John Busby

15 February 2022 29	Bristol Rovers	2–0	Sutton United	Horfield
19:45 GMT	H.Anderson 4' (yellow card) 57'; Collins 46'	Report	Davis (yellow card) 12'; Kizzi (yellow card) 56'; Rowe (yellow card) 65'	Stadium: Memorial Stadium; Attendance: 6,700; Referee: Christopher Pollard

19 February 2022 30	Stevenage	0–4	Bristol Rovers	Stevenage
15:00 GMT	Bostwick (yellow card) 25'	Report	Coutts (yellow card) 21'; Finley 36' (yellow card) 67'; E.Anderson 50' (yellow card) 90'; H.Anderson 54'; Collins 74'	Stadium: Lamex Stadium; Attendance: 3,538; Referee: Andy Woolmer

22 February 2022 31	Leyton Orient	0–2	Bristol Rovers	Leyton
19:45 GMT	Ogie (yellow card) 9'; Beckles (yellow card) 14'; Pratley (yellow card) 40'; Khan (yellow card) 90+4'	Report	Evans (yellow card) 28' (goal) 34'; Collins 37'; Whelan (yellow card) 76'; Loft (yellow card) 82'	Stadium: Brisbane Road; Attendance: 2,840; Referee: Charles Breakspear

26 February 2022 32	Bristol Rovers	1–1	Exeter City	Horfield
15:00 GMT	Hoole 10'	Report	Brown 24'; Grounds (yellow card) 90'	Stadium: Memorial Stadium; Attendance: 9,689; Referee: Peter Wright

1 March 2022 33	Bristol Rovers	1–0	Barrow	Horfield
19:45 GMT	Evans (yellow card) 45+3' (goal) 81'; Anderton (yellow card) 53'; Collins (yellow card) 68'	Report	Canavan (red card) 32'	Stadium: Memorial Stadium; Attendance: 6,685; Referee: David Rock

5 March 2022 34	Newport County	1–0	Bristol Rovers	Newport
15:00 GMT	Waite 33'	Report	Loft (yellow card) 56'; Nicholson (yellow card) 80'; Connolly (yellow card) 84'	Stadium: Rodney Parade; Attendance: 6,237; Referee: Darren Handley

8 March 2022 35	Crawley Town	1–2	Bristol Rovers	Crawley
19:45 GMT	Craig (yellow card) 13'; Payne (yellow card) 45'; Hessenthaler 69'; Tsaroulla (yellow card) 89'	Report	H.Anderson 41'; Collins 65'; Hoole (yellow card) 72'	Stadium: Broadfield Stadium; Attendance: 2,223; Referee: Lee Swabey

12 March 2022 36	Bristol Rovers	3–0	Harrogate Town	Horfield
15:00 GMT	Collins 33', 55'; E.Anderson 39'; Hoole (yellow card) 44'; Taylor (yellow card) 53'; Anderton (yellow card) 90+5'	Report	Diamond (yellow card) 41'	Stadium: Memorial Stadium; Attendance: 7,884; Referee: Darren Drysdale

15 March 2022 37	Bristol Rovers	1–0	Colchester United	Horfield
19:45 GMT	E.Anderson 49'; Evans (yellow card) 90+2'	Report	Skuse (yellow card) 15'; Hannant (yellow card) 42'; Edwards (yellow card) 70'	Stadium: Memorial Stadium; Attendance: 7,314; Referee: Sam Allison

19 March 2022 38	Northampton Town	0–1	Bristol Rovers	Northampton
15:00 GMT	McGowan (yellow card) 61'; Lewis (yellow card) 71'; Pinnock (yellow card) 90+2'	Report	H.Anderson 1'; Finley (yellow card) 68'; Belshaw (yellow card) 75'; Connolly (yellow card) 81'; Taylor (yellow card) 90+1'	Stadium: Sixfields Stadium; Attendance: 6,405; Referee: Oliver Langford

26 March 2022 39	Carlisle United	1–0	Bristol Rovers	Carlisle
15:00 GMT	Armer (yellow card) 65'; Dennis 72', (yellow card) 90+6'; Dickenson (yellow card) 90+6'; Patrick (yellow card) 90+7'	Report	Taylor (yellow card) 90+6'; Saunders (yellow card) 90+8'	Stadium: Brunton Park; Attendance: 5,884; Referee: Andy Haines

2 April 2022 40	Bristol Rovers	2–1	Bradford City	Horfield
15:00 BST	Clarke (yellow card) 52'; Finley 57'; Taylor 75'	Report	Hendrie (yellow card) 30'; Pereira 46'; Watt (yellow card) 72'	Stadium: Memorial Stadium; Attendance: 9,186; Referee: Neil Hair

9 April 2022 41	Tranmere Rovers	1–1	Bristol Rovers	Birkenhead
15:00 BST	Hemmings 56' (yellow card) 60'; Merrie (yellow card) 65'; Spearing (yellow card) 83'	Report	E.Anderson 63'	Stadium: Prenton Park; Attendance: 6,637; Referee: Marc Edwards

15 April 2022 42	Bristol Rovers	1–0	Salford City	Horfield
15:00 BST	Finley (yellow card) 45+3'; Evans (yellow card) 62'; E.Anderson 75'; H.Anderson (yellow card) 90+3'	Report	Touray (yellow card) 24'; Kelly (yellow card) 44'; Ndaba (yellow card) 59'	Stadium: Memorial Stadium; Attendance: 9,590; Referee: Dean Whitestone

18 April 2022 43	Port Vale	1–3	Bristol Rovers	Burslem
15:00 BST	Proctor 2'; Hall (yellow card) 47'; Benning (yellow card) 49'	Report	Taylor (yellow card) 8'; E.Anderson 10'; H.Anderson (yellow card) 22'; Connolly 32'; Coutts (yellow card) 45'; Grant (yellow card) 51'; Finley (yellow card) 77'; Loft 90+4' (yellow card) 90+5'	Stadium: Vale Park; Attendance: 10,840; Referee: Craig Hicks

23 April 2022 44	Bristol Rovers	0–0	Forest Green Rovers	Horfield
15:00 BST	Finley (yellow card) 51'; Evans (yellow card) 64'; E.Anderson (yellow card) 74'; Collins (yellow card) 90+1'; Taylor (yellow card) 90+4'	Report	Adams (yellow card) 19'; Stevenson (yellow card) 22'; Hendry (yellow card) 57'; McGee (yellow card) 77'	Stadium: Memorial Stadium; Attendance: 9,690; Referee: Gavin Ward

30 April 2022 45	Rochdale	3–4	Bristol Rovers	Spotland
15:00 BST	Charman 11', 17', (yellow card) 85'; Keohane (yellow card) 58'; O'Keeffe 60', (yellow card) 83'; Taylor (yellow card) 69'	Report	H. Anderson (yellow card) 39'; Finley 54'; Collins 66', 89', 90+5'; Coutts (red card) 90+8'	Stadium: Crown Oil Arena; Attendance: 4,628; Referee: Ross Joyce

7 May 2022 46	Bristol Rovers	7–0	Scunthorpe United	Horfield
15:00 BST	Lobley 18' (o.g.); Taylor 22'; Collins 53', 79'; Evans 61', 76'; Anderson 85'	Report	Delaney (yellow card) 45+1'; Shrimpton (yellow card) 51'; Beestin (yellow card) 69'; Nuttall (yellow card) 71'	Stadium: Memorial Stadium; Referee: Charles Breakspear

=== FA Cup ===
Win Draw Loss

The draw for the first round was made on 17 October 2021 by Kelly Smith and Wes Morgan. The second round draw was made on 8 November 2021 by Shaun Wright-Phillips and Rachel Yankey. The third round draw was made on 6 December 2021 by David Seaman and Faye White.

7 November 2021 First round	Oxford United	2–2	Bristol Rovers	Littlemore
13:00 GMT	Taylor 11', (yellow card) 32'; McGuane 51'	Report	Finley (yellow card) 33', (goal) 45+2'; Coutts (yellow card) 45'; Evans 87' (pen.)	Stadium: The Kassam Stadium; Attendance: 5,083; Referee: Paul Howard

16 November 2021 First round replay	Bristol Rovers	4–3 (a.e.t.)	Oxford United	Horfield
19:00 GMT	Finley 48'; Evans (yellow card) 50'; Spence (yellow card) 107' (goal) 110', 118'; Collins 115'	Report	Kane (yellow card) 4'; Bodin (yellow card) 38' (goal) 91'; Taylor 57' (pen.); Seddon 93'	Stadium: Memorial Stadium; Attendance: 4,918; Referee: Neil Hair

4 December 2021 Second round	Bristol Rovers	2–1	Sutton United	Horfield
15:00 GMT	Evans (yellow card) 28'; Taylor (yellow card) 45+1'; Collins 57' (pen.); Anderton 59'	Report	Davis (yellow card) 22'; Randall 52'; Eastmond (yellow card) 72'	Stadium: Memorial Stadium; Attendance: 4,456; Referee: Darren Drysdale

8 January 2022 Third round	Peterborough United	2–1	Bristol Rovers	Peterborough
15:00 GMT	Szmodics 20'; Mumba 63'; Norburn (yellow card) 79'	Report	Coutts 30' (pen.)	Stadium: London Road Stadium; Attendance: 4,937; Referee: Andy Davies

=== EFL Cup ===
Win Draw Loss

The draw for the first round was made on 24 June 2021 by Andy Cole and Danny Mills.

10 August 2021 First round	Bristol Rovers	0–2	Cheltenham Town	Horfield
19:45 BST	Baldwin (yellow card) 88'	Report	May 58'; Vassell 71'	Stadium: Memorial Stadium; Referee: Lee Swabey

=== EFL Trophy ===
Win Draw Loss

The Gas were drawn against Chelsea U21s, Cheltenham Town and Exeter City.

Pos	Div	Team	Pld	W	PW	PL	L	GF	GA	GD	Pts	Qualification
1	L2	Exeter City	3	1	1	1	0	8	6	+2	6	Advance to Round 2
2	ACA	Chelsea U21	3	1	1	1	0	3	2	+1	6	Advance to Round 2
3	L2	Bristol Rovers	3	1	0	0	2	6	7	−1	3	
4	L1	Cheltenham Town	3	0	1	1	1	2	4	−2	3	

Source: EFL.com

31 August 2021 Group Stage	Bristol Rovers	2–0	Cheltenham Town	Horfield
19:00 BST	Nicholson 61'; Saunders 70'	Report		Stadium: Memorial Stadium; Attendance: 889; Referee: Will Finnie

13 October 2021 Group Stage	Bristol Rovers	1–2	Chelsea U21	Horfield
19:00 BST	Thomas 17'; Harries (yellow card) 56'; Mehew (yellow card) 84'	Report	Lovelock 39' (o.g.); Baker 48'	Stadium: Memorial Stadium; Attendance: 1,149; Referee: Christopher Pollard

10 November 2021 Group Stage	Exeter City	5–3	Bristol Rovers	Exeter
19:00 GMT	Coley 2', 44'; Dieng 4'; Amond 12', 38'; Sweeney (yellow card) 76'; Daniel (yellow card) 90+2'	Report	Martinez (yellow card) 24'; Westbrooke 61'; Jones 72' (yellow card) 74'; Mbuenimo (yellow card) 81'; Anderton 88'	Stadium: St James Park; Attendance: 1,479; Referee: Darren Drysdale

== Statistics ==
Players with squad numbers struck through and marked † left the club during the playing season.
Players with names in italics and marked * were on loan from another club for the whole of their season with Bristol Rovers.

As of match played 7 May 2022

No.	Pos	Nat	Player	Total		League Two		FA Cup		League Cup		League Trophy	
No.	Pos	Nat	Player	Apps	Goals	Apps	Goals	Apps	Goals	Apps	Goals	Apps	Goals
1	GK	(England) ENG	James Belshaw	47	0	42+0	0	4+0	0	1+0	0	0+0	0
2	DF	(England) ENG	James Connolly*	25	1	24+0	1	1+0	0	0+0	0	0+0	0
~~3~~ †	DF	(England) ENG	Mark Hughes	6	0	6+0	0	0+0	0	0+0	0	0+0	0
4	MF	(England) ENG	Josh Grant	26	3	20+2	3	1+1	0	1+0	0	1+0	0
5	DF	(England) ENG	Alfie Kilgour	14	1	10+1	1	1+0	0	1+0	0	1+0	0
6	MF	(England) ENG	Sam Finley	40	7	33+3	5	3+0	2	0+0	0	1+0	0
7	MF	(England) ENG	Luke Thomas*	32	1	11+17	0	2+0	0	1+0	0	1+0	1
9	FW	(England) ENG	Leon Clarke	11	2	2+9	2	0+0	0	0+0	0	0+0	0
~~9~~ †	FW	(England) ENG	Brandon Hanlan	1	0	0+1	0	0+0	0	0+0	0	0+0	0
10	FW	(Wales) WAL	Aaron Collins	50	18	36+9	16	1+2	2	0+0	0	2+0	0
11	MF	(Scotland) SCO	Sam Nicholson	39	6	26+8	5	3+0	0	0+0	0	2+0	1
12	MF	(England) ENG	Elliot Anderson*	21	7	20+1	7	0+0	0	0+0	0	0+0	0
15	MF	(Scotland) SCO	Paul Coutts	43	1	35+4	0	4+0	1	0+0	0	0+0	0
16	DF	(England) ENG	Nick Anderton	39	3	26+8	1	3+0	1	1+0	0	1+0	1
17	DF	(England) ENG	Connor Taylor*	47	3	41+1	3	3+0	0	1+0	0	1+0	0
19	MF	(England) ENG	Harry Anderson	48	6	38+5	6	3+0	0	1+0	0	1+0	0
20	DF	(Republic of Ireland) IRL	Trevor Clarke	9	0	5+2	0	1+0	0	0+0	0	1+0	0
21	MF	(England) ENG	Antony Evans	39	11	34+1	10	4+0	1	0+0	0	0+0	0
22	FW	(England) ENG	Harvey Saunders	23	3	10+11	2	0+0	0	1+0	0	1+0	1
24	MF	(Wales) WAL	Sion Spence*	12	3	1+5	1	1+2	2	0+1	0	2+0	0
25	DF	(Wales) WAL	Cian Harries	21	1	15+1	1	3+0	0	0+0	0	2+0	0
~~26~~ †	DF	(England) ENG	Jack Baldwin	4	0	2+1	0	0+0	0	1+0	0	0+0	0
26	MF	(Republic of Ireland) IRL	Glenn Whelan	33	0	19+12	0	2+0	0	0+0	0	0+0	0
28	MF	(England) ENG	Jon Nolan	1	0	0+1	0	0+0	0	0+0	0	0+0	0
~~28~~ †	MF	(England) ENG	Zain Walker	2	0	0+0	0	0+0	0	0+0	0	2+0	0
30	DF	(Wales) WAL	Luca Hoole	32	1	27+2	1	1+1	0	0+0	0	1+0	0
32	GK	(Finland) FIN	Anssi Jaakkola	4	0	4+0	0	0+0	0	0+0	0	0+0	0
33	MF	(England) ENG	Alex Rodman	4	0	3+1	0	0+0	0	0+0	0	0+0	0
35	GK	(England) ENG	Jed Ward	3	0	0+0	0	0+0	0	0+0	0	3+0	0
38	FW	(England) ENG	Ryan Loft	13	1	2+11	1	0+0	0	0+0	0	0+0	0
39	DF	(England) ENG	Junior Brown	6	0	4+2	0	0+0	0	0+0	0	0+0	0
41	FW	(England) ENG	Jarmani Langlais	2	0	0+0	0	0+0	0	0+1	0	0+1	0
42	DF	(England) ENG	Niall Lovelock	1	0	0+0	0	0+0	0	0+0	0	1+0	0
48	DF	(England) ENG	Tyron Mbuenimo	2	0	0+0	0	0+0	0	0+0	0	1+1	0
52	MF	(Wales) WAL	Max Edwards-Stryjewski	1	0	0+0	0	0+1	0	0+0	0	0+0	0
Players out on loan:
8	MF	(England) ENG	Zain Westbrooke	9	1	0+3	0	2+0	0	1+0	0	2+1	1
14	MF	(England) ENG	Cameron Hargreaves	4	0	1+0	0	0+0	0	0+0	0	2+1	0
18	DF	(Wales) WAL	Pablo Martinez	4	0	0+1	0	0+1	0	0+0	0	2+0	0
23	MF	(England) ENG	Tom Mehew	1	0	0+0	0	0+0	0	0+0	0	1+0	0
27	MF	(England) ENG	Ben Liddle	1	0	0+0	0	0+0	0	1+0	0	0+0	0
29	FW	(England) ENG	Kieran Phillips	1	0	0+0	0	0+0	0	0+0	0	0+1	0
40	FW	Jersey	Brett Pitman	18	4	8+8	4	0+2	0	0+0	0	0+0	0
44	MF	(England) ENG	Ryan Jones	5	1	0+0	0	0+2	0	0+1	0	1+1	1

=== Goals Record ===
As of match played 7 May 2022

Rank	No.	Nat.	Po.	Name	League Two	FA Cup	League Cup	League Trophy	Total
1	10	(Wales)	CF	Aaron Collins	16	2	0	0	18
2	21	(England)	AM	Antony Evans	10	1	0	0	11
3	6	(England)	CM	Sam Finley	5	2	0	0	7
3	12	(Scotland)	AM	Elliot Anderson	7	0	0	0	7
5	11	(Scotland)	LW	Sam Nicholson	5	0	0	1	6
5	19	(England)	RM	Harry Anderson	6	0	0	0	6
7	40	(Jersey)	CF	Brett Pitman	4	0	0	0	4
8	4	(England)	DM	Josh Grant	3	0	0	0	3
8	16	(England)	LB	Nick Anderton	1	1	0	1	3
8	17	(England)	CB	Connor Taylor	3	0	0	0	3
8	22	(England)	CF	Harvey Saunders	2	0	0	1	3
8	24	(Wales)	AM	Sion Spence	1	2	0	0	3
13	9	(England)	CF	Leon Clarke	2	0	0	0	2
14	2	(Wales)	CB	James Connolly	1	0	0	0	1
14	5	(England)	CB	Alfie Kilgour	1	0	0	0	1
14	7	(England)	AM	Luke Thomas	0	0	0	1	1
14	8	(England)	CM	Zain Westbrooke	0	0	0	1	1
14	15	(Scotland)	CM	Paul Coutts	0	1	0	0	1
14	25	(Wales)	CB	Cian Harries	1	0	0	0	1
14	30	(Wales)	RB	Luca Hoole	1	0	0	0	1
14	38	(England)	CF	Ryan Loft	1	0	0	0	1
14	44	(England)	LW	Ryan Jones	0	0	0	1	1
Total					70	9	0	6	85

=== Disciplinary record ===
As of match played 7 May 2022

Rank	No.	Nat.	Po.	Name	League Two			FA Cup			League Cup			League Trophy			Total		
Rank	No.	Nat.	Po.	Name	Booked	(yellow card) (yellow-red card)	Sent off (straight red)	Booked	(yellow card) (yellow-red card)	Sent off (straight red)	Booked	(yellow card) (yellow-red card)	Sent off (straight red)	Booked	(yellow card) (yellow-red card)	Sent off (straight red)	Booked	(yellow card) (yellow-red card)	Sent off (straight red)
1	6	(England)	CM	Sam Finley	13	0	1	1	0	0	0	0	0	0	0	0	14	0	1
2	15	(Scotland)	CM	Paul Coutts	8	0	2	1	0	0	0	0	0	0	0	0	9	0	2
2	21	(England)	AM	Antony Evans	9	0	0	2	0	0	0	0	0	0	0	0	11	0	0
4	25	(Wales)	CB	Cian Harries	7	1	1	0	0	0	0	0	0	1	0	0	8	1	1
5	17	(England)	CB	Connor Taylor	7	0	0	1	0	0	0	0	0	0	0	0	8	0	0
6	19	(England)	RW	Harry Anderson	5	0	0	0	0	0	0	0	0	0	0	0	5	0	0
6	26	(Republic of Ireland)	CM	Glenn Whelan	4	1	0	0	0	0	0	0	0	0	0	0	4	1	0
8	5	(England)	CB	Alfie Kilgour	3	1	0	0	0	0	0	0	0	0	0	0	3	1	0
8	10	(Wales)	CF	Aaron Collins	4	0	0	0	0	0	0	0	0	0	0	0	4	0	0
8	16	(England)	LB	Nick Anderton	4	0	0	0	0	0	0	0	0	0	0	0	4	0	0
8	22	(England)	CF	Harvey Saunders	4	0	0	0	0	0	0	0	0	0	0	0	4	0	0
8	30	(Wales)	RB	Luca Hoole	3	1	0	0	0	0	0	0	0	0	0	0	3	1	0
8	38	(England)	CF	Ryan Loft	4	0	0	0	0	0	0	0	0	0	0	0	4	0	0
14	2	(England)	CB	James Connolly	3	0	0	0	0	0	0	0	0	0	0	0	3	0	0
14	4	(England)	DM	Josh Grant	3	0	0	0	0	0	0	0	0	0	0	0	3	0	0
14	40	(Jersey)	CF	Brett Pitman	3	0	0	0	0	0	0	0	0	0	0	0	3	0	0
17	12	(Scotland)	AM	Elliot Anderson	2	0	0	0	0	0	0	0	0	0	0	0	2	0	0
17	20	(Republic of Ireland)	LB	Trevor Clarke	1	0	1	0	0	0	0	0	0	0	0	0	1	0	1
17	26	(England)	CB	Jack Baldwin	1	0	0	0	0	0	1	0	0	0	0	0	2	0	0
19	1	(England)	GK	James Belshaw	1	0	0	0	0	0	0	0	0	0	0	0	1	0	0
19	7	(England)	RW	Luke Thomas	1	0	0	0	0	0	0	0	0	0	0	0	1	0	0
19	8	(England)	CM	Zain Westbrooke	1	0	0	0	0	0	0	0	0	0	0	0	1	0	0
19	11	(Scotland)	LW	Sam Nicholson	1	0	0	0	0	0	0	0	0	0	0	0	1	0	0
19	18	(Wales)	CB	Pablo Martinez	0	0	0	0	0	0	0	0	0	1	0	0	1	0	0
19	23	(England)	CM	Tom Mehew	0	0	0	0	0	0	0	0	0	1	0	0	1	0	0
19	24	(Wales)	AM	Sion Spence	0	0	0	1	0	0	0	0	0	0	0	0	1	0	0
19	39	(England)	LB	Junior Brown	1	0	0	0	0	0	0	0	0	0	0	0	1	0	0
19	44	(England)	LW	Ryan Jones	0	0	0	0	0	0	0	0	0	1	0	0	1	0	0
19	48	(England)	RB	Tyron Mbuenimo	0	0	0	0	0	0	0	0	0	1	0	0	1	0	0
Total					95	4	5	6	0	0	1	0	0	5	0	0	107	4	5
