= Cameron Hargreaves =

English footballer (born 1998)

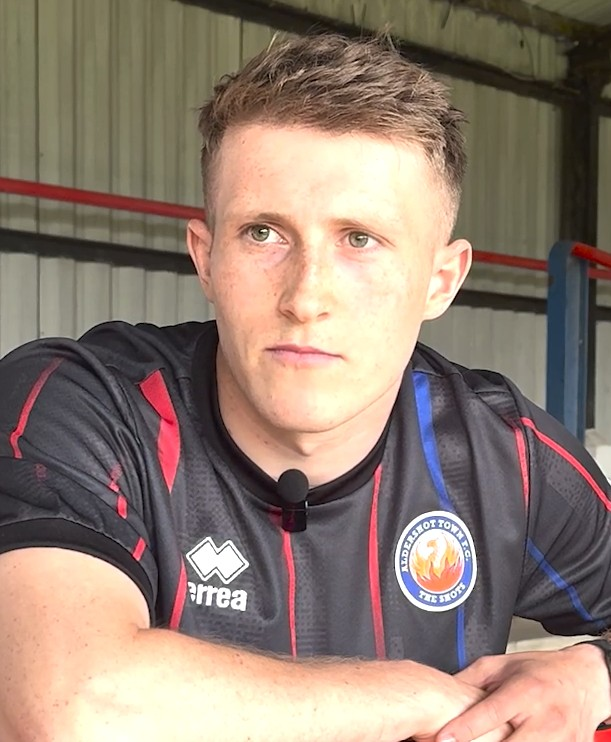
- Hargreaves in June 2024

Personal information
- Full name: Cameron Hargreaves
- Date of birth: 4 December 1998 (age 27)
- Place of birth: Plymouth, England
- Height: 5 ft 10 in (1.78 m)
- Position: Midfielder

Team information
- Current team: Kidderminster Harriers

Youth career
- –2017: Exeter City
- 2017–2019: Bristol Rovers

Senior career*
Years	Team	Apps	(Gls)
2017–2022	Bristol Rovers	5	(0)
2018–2019	→ Hungerford Town (loan)	21	(0)
2021	→ Chippenham Town (loan)	3	(0)
2022	→ King's Lynn Town (loan)	19	(0)
2022–2024	King's Lynn Town	60	(6)
2024–2026	Aldershot Town	85	(8)
2026–	Kidderminster Harriers	0	(0)
- * Club domestic league appearances and goals as of 18:10, 27 August 2026 (UTC)

Cameron Hargreaves (born 4 December 1998) is an English professional footballer who plays as a midfielder for National League club Kidderminster Harriers.

== Career ==
=== Exeter City ===
Hargreaves began his career in the youth academy at Exeter City. He was released by the club in May 2017.

=== Bristol Rovers ===
In April 2017, Hargreaves agreed terms to join Bristol Rovers upon the expiration of his contract with Exeter City. In July 2017, he joined the first team during a pre-season camp in Portugal.

On 29 August 2017, he made his professional debut replacing Liam Sercombe in the 83rd minute of a 5–1 EFL Trophy victory against Wycombe Wanderers. On 31 October, he replaced Ryan Broom in the 66th minute of a 3–1 defeat to West Ham United Under-23s in the same competition. On 29 November 2018, Hargreaves was loaned out to Hungerford Town for the rest of 2018. The deal was later extended for the rest of the season.

At the end of the 2018–19 season, Bristol Rovers exercised a contract extension for him.

Hargreaves made his first league appearance for the club in a 1–0 victory over Milton Keynes Dons, replacing Ed Upson in the 75th minute of the match and made his full league debut for the club in a 0–0 draw with Fleetwood Town on 29 December 2019, playing 84 minutes before being substituted.

On 3 June 2020, Hargreaves signed a new two-year extension to his contract after having a breakthrough season.

On 12 November 2021, Hargreaves, along with his Rovers teammate Zain Walker, joined National League South side Chippenham Town on loan. On 9 December, this loan deal was extended by a month.

On 5 February 2022, Hargreaves joined National League side King's Lynn Town on a one-month loan deal. Hargreaves was released by Rovers at the end of the 2021–22 season.

=== King's Lynn Town ===
On 30 June 2022, Hargreaves returned to King's Lynn Town on a one-year deal for the upcoming National League North season following their relegation the previous season.

Following the conclusion of the 2023–24 season, the club announced that Hargreaves had departed having rejected several offers to stay.

=== Aldershot Town ===
On 18 June 2024, Hargreaves joined National League side Aldershot Town on a one-year deal.

=== Kidderminster Harriers ===
On 27 August 2026, he joined National League club Kidderminster Harriers.

== Personal life ==
He is the son of Chris Hargreaves, the former Bristol Rovers' Academy Manager and former professional footballer who was most recently manager of Yeovil Town.

== Career statistics ==
As of end of 2021–22 season

Appearances and goals by club, season and competition
Club	Season	League			FA Cup		EFL Trophy		Other		Total	
Club	Season	Division	Apps	Goals	Apps	Goals	Apps	Goals	Apps	Goals	Apps	Goals
Bristol Rovers	2017–18	League One	0	0	0	0	0	0	2 (Note: Appearance(s) in EFL Trophy)	0	2	0
Bristol Rovers	2018–19	League One	0	0	0	0	0	0	1	0	1	0
Bristol Rovers	2019–20	League One	6	0	3	0	0	0	1	0	10	0
Bristol Rovers	2020–21	League One	13	0	0	0	1	0	5	0	19	0
Bristol Rovers	2021–22	League Two	1	0	0	0	0	0	3	0	4	0
Bristol Rovers	Total		20	0	3	0	1	0	12	0	36	0
Hungerford Town (loan)	2018–19	National League South	21	0	0	0	—		0	0	21	0
Chippenham Town (loan)	2021–22	National League South	3	0	—		—		1 (Note: Appearance(s) in FA Trophy)	0	4	0
King's Lynn Town (loan)	2021–22	National League	19	0	—		—		0	0	19	0
Career total			63	0	3	0	1	0	13	0	80	0

== Honours ==
Aldershot Town

- FA Trophy: 2024–25
