= Tyron Mbuenimo =

English footballer

Tyron Thomson Mbuenimo
Personal information
- Full name: Tyron Thomson Mbuenimo
- Date of birth: 5 November 2003 (age 22)

Team information
- Current team: Fisher

Youth career
- Tottenham Hotspur
- Onside Academy
- 2020–2023: Bristol Rovers

Senior career*
Years	Team	Apps	(Gls)
2021–2023	Bristol Rovers	0	(0)
2021	→ Yate Town (loan)	1	(0)
2023–	Fisher	48	(2)
2023–2024	→ Basildon United (dual-registration)	5	(0)
- * Club domestic league appearances and goals as of 19:30, 6 May 2025 (UTC)

Tyron Thomson Mbuenimo (born 5 November 2003) is an English footballer who plays as a defender for Southern Counties East League Premier Division club Fisher.

== Career ==
Mbuenimo started his career in the youth system of Tottenham Hotspur before being released. After Tottenham he joined the 'Onside Academy' who try to get players back into league clubs.

Mbuenimo joined Bristol Rovers in the May 2020 following a successful trial period. On 13 October 2021, Mbuenimo made his senior debut, coming off of the bench in an EFL Trophy group-stage defeat to Chelsea U21s.

On 9 September 2021, Mbuenimo joined Southern League Premier Division side Yate Town on a one-month youth loan deal. He made his debut for the club off of the bench 6 days later in a 2–0 home defeat to Truro City.

In March 2023, Mbuenimo joined Southern Counties East Premier Division club Fisher. He made the step up to Isthmian League North Division club Basildon United in December 2023 on a dual-registration basis.

== Career statistics ==
As of end of 2024–25 season

Appearances and goals by club, season and competition
Club	Season	League			FA Cup		League Cup		Other		Total	
Club	Season	Division	Apps	Goals	Apps	Goals	Apps	Goals	Apps	Goals	Apps	Goals
Bristol Rovers	2021–22	League Two	0	0	0	0	0	0	2 (Note: Appearance(s) in EFL Trophy)	0	2	0
Yate Town (loan)	2021–22	Southern Premier South	1	0	1	0	—		0	0	2	0
Fisher	2022–23	SCEFL Premier Division	3	0	0	0	—		0	0	3	0
Fisher	2023–24	SCEFL Premier Division	22	1	1	0	—		1 (Note: Appearance(s) in Southern Counties East Football League Challenge Cup)	0	24	1
Fisher	2024–25	SCEFL Premier Division	23	1	1	0	—		4 (Note: One appearance in FA Vase, one appearances in SCEFL Challenge Cup, two appearances in SCEFL Premier Division play-offs)	0	28	1
Fisher	Total		48	2	2	0	0	0	5	0	55	2
Basildon United (dual-registration)	2023–24	Isthmian League North Division	5	0	0	0	—		0	0	5	0
Career total			54	2	3	0	0	0	7	0	64	2
