= Theo Widdrington =

English footballer (born 1999)

Personal information
- Full name: Theo Jack Widdrington
- Date of birth: 6 April 1999 (age 27)
- Place of birth: Southampton, England
- Height: 5 ft 10 in (1.78 m)
- Position: Midfielder

Team information
- Current team: Dorking Wanderers
- Number: 31

Youth career
- 2005–2017: Portsmouth

Senior career*
Years	Team	Apps	(Gls)
2017–2018	Portsmouth	0	(0)
2017	→ Havant & Waterlooville (loan)	17	(3)
2018–2020	Bristol Rovers	0	(0)
2018–2019	→ Bognor Regis Town (loan)	6	(0)
2019	→ Bognor Regis Town (loan)	10	(3)
2019	→ Welling United (loan)	11	(1)
2020	→ Hemel Hempstead Town (loan)	2	(0)
2020	Lewes	0	(0)
2020–2022	Havant & Waterlooville	5	(0)
2021	→ Gosport Borough (loan)	9	(2)
2021–2022	→ King's Lynn Town (loan)	4	(0)
2022–2023	King's Lynn Town	53	(7)
2023–2026	Aldershot Town	84	(3)
2026	Hampton & Richmond Borough	7	(1)
2026–	Dorking Wanderers	0	(0)
- * Club domestic league appearances and goals as of 11:51, 30 October 2026 (UTC)

Theo Jack Widdrington (born 6 April 1999) is an English professional footballer who plays as a midfielder for National League South club Dorking Wanderers.

== Early and personal life ==
Born in Southampton, Widdrington is the second son and middle child of Tommy Widdrington. He is the brother of professional dancer Kai Widdrington.

== Career ==
Widdrington began his career with Portsmouth, turning professional in 2017. He was released in April 2018 after 13 years with the club, having spent time earlier that season on loan at Havant & Waterlooville.

He signed for Bristol Rovers in July 2018.

He made his debut on 13 November 2018 in the EFL Trophy, one of four Bristol Rovers players (alongside Tareiq Holmes-Dennis, Zain Walker and Connor Jones) to do so in that match. On 21 December 2018 he moved on loan to Bognor Regis Town for one month. On 8 February 2019, he was loaned out to the same club once again, also for one month this time. On 11 March it was announced, that the loan deal had been extended for the rest of the season. On 13 April, Widdrington broke his wrist and missed the rest of the season.

In September 2019 he moved on loan to Welling United, and to Hemel Hempstead Town in March 2020.

He was released by Bristol Rovers at the end of the 2019–20 season.

On 31 August 2020 he signed for Lewes. He then moved to former club Havant & Waterlooville two weeks later.

He moved on loan to Gosport Borough in September 2021. He scored two goals in a match later that month.

On 23 December 2021, Widdrington joined King's Lynn Town on loan until the end of January, the club managed by his father. The loan was made permanent in early 2022. His first goal for the club came when he scored the only goal as Lynn defeated high-flying Bromley to keep their survival hopes alive. On 30 June 2022, Widdrington signed a one-year contract extension with the club following their relegation to the National League North.

In June 2023, he signed for Aldershot Town, joining his father Tommy at the club. On 27 April 2026, it was announced that Widdrington would leave the club at the end of his contract in June.

On 1 July 2026, Widdrington joined National League South side Hampton & Richmond Borough. After eight appearances and one goal in all competitions, Widdrington left Hampton & Richmond Borough in October 2026 via mutual consent.

On 30 October 2026, following his departure from Hampton & Richmond Borough, Widdrington joined fellow National League South club Dorking Wanderers on a deal until the end of the season.

== Career statistics ==
As of match played 20 October 2026

Appearances and goals by club, season and competition
Club	Season	League			FA Cup		EFL Cup		Other		Total	
Club	Season	Division	Apps	Goals	Apps	Goals	Apps	Goals	Apps	Goals	Apps	Goals
Portsmouth	2017–18	League One	0	0	0	0	0	0	0	0	0	0
Havant & Waterlooville (loan)	2017–18	National League South	17	3	—		—		2 (Note: Appearances in the FA Trophy)	0	19	3
Bristol Rovers	2018–19	League One	0	0	0	0	0	0	1 (Note: Appearance in the EFL Trophy)	0	1	0
Bristol Rovers	2019–20	League One	0	0	0	0	0	0	0	0	0	0
Bristol Rovers	Total		0	0	0	0	0	0	1	0	1	0
Bognor Regis Town (loan)	2018–19	Isthmian League Premier Division	16	3	—		—		—		16	3
Welling United (loan)	2019–20	National League South	11	1	3	0	—		2	0	16	1
Hemel Hempstead Town (loan)	2019–20	National League South	2	0	—		—		—		2	0
Lewes	2020–21	Isthmian League Premier Division	0	0	—		—		0	0	0	0
Havant & Waterlooville	2020–21	National League South	4	0	4	1	—		0	0	8	1
Havant & Waterlooville	2021–22	National League South	1	0	—		—		—		1	0
Havant & Waterlooville	Total		5	0	4	1	—		0	0	9	1
Gosport Borough (loan)	2021–22	Southern League Premier Division South	9	2	2	1	—		1	0	12	3
King's Lynn Town (loan)	2021–22	National League	4	0	—		—		—		4	0
King's Lynn Town	2021–22	National League	13	1	—		—		—		13	1
King's Lynn Town	2022–23	National League North	40	6	6	1	—		1 (Note: Appearance in the National League North play-offs)	0	47	7
King's Lynn Town	Total		53	7	6	1	—		1	0	60	8
Aldershot Town	2023–24	National League	24	0	3	0	—		1	0	28	0
Aldershot Town	2024–25	National League	36	1	2	0	—		8 (Note: Three appearances in the National League Cup, five appearances in the FA Trophy)	0	46	1
Aldershot Town	2025–26	National League	24	2	1	0	—		3 (Note: Two appearances in the National League Cup, one appearance in the FA Trophy)	0	28	2
Aldershot Town	Total		84	3	6	0	—		12	0	102	3
Hampton & Richmond Borough	2026–27	National League South	7	1	1	0	—		0	0	8	1
Dorking Wanderers	2026–27	National League South	0	0	—		—		0	0	0	0
Career total			208	20	22	3	0	0	19	0	249	23

== Honours ==
Aldershot Town

- FA Trophy: 2024–25
