= Sion Spence =

Welsh association football player

Personal information
- Full name: Sion Spence
- Date of birth: 2 October 2000 (age 26)
- Position: Midfielder

Team information
- Current team: Barry Town United
- Number: 23

Youth career
- Cardiff City

Senior career*
Years	Team	Apps	(Gls)
2019–2020	Cardiff City	0	(0)
2019–2020	→ Barry Town United (loan)	13	(1)
2020–2022	Crystal Palace	0	(0)
2021–2022	→ Bristol Rovers (loan)	6	(1)
2022–2023	Gloucester City	18	(5)
2023	King's Lynn Town	12	(0)
2023–2024	Havant & Waterlooville	16	(1)
2024–2025	Hednesford Town	20	(3)
2025	Gloucester City		
2026–	Barry Town United	9	(0)

International career^{‡}
2016–2017	Wales U16		
2016	Wales U17	5	(0)
2018–2019	Wales U19	10	(3)
2020–2021	Wales U21	7	(0)
- * Club domestic league appearances and goals as of 07:47, 8 November 2026 (UTC) ‡ National team caps and goals as of 17:10, 20 October 2021 (UTC)

Sion Spence (Welsh: Siôn Spence, born 2 October 2000) is a Welsh professional footballer who plays as a midfielder for Cymru Premier side Barry Town United.

== Club career ==
=== Cardiff City ===
Spence started his career at Cardiff City where he was awarded the club's academy player of the year award for the 2017–18 season. Spence was also part of the Cardiff City Under-18s side that was crowned champions of the PDL2 South.

In September 2019, Spence joined Cymru Premier side Barry Town United on loan.

=== Crystal Palace ===
Following his release from Cardiff, Spence joined Premier League side Crystal Palace in September 2020, initially joining up with the club's under-23s side.

On 9 July 2021, Spence joined recently-relegated League Two side Bristol Rovers on a season-long loan deal. He made his professional debut in a 2–0 EFL Cup defeat to Cheltenham Town. On 25 September 2021, Spence made his league debut for the club when he came on as a 90th minute substitute for Harvey Saunders against Walsall. He scored to give Rovers a 2–1 victory, the club's first away win for 9 months.

Spence was released by Crystal Palace at the end of the 2021–22 season.

=== Non-League ===
On 4 August 2022, Spence signed for National League North club Gloucester City on a one-year deal.

On 7 July 2023, Spence signed for National League North club King's Lynn Town. On 21 October 2023, Spence joined National League South bottom club Havant & Waterlooville.

On 24 June 2024, Spence joined Northern Premier League Division One West club Hednesford Town.

In June 2025, Spence returned to Southern League Premier Division South club Gloucester City.

In June 2026 he re-joined Barry Town United.

== International career ==
In 2016, Spence scored for the Wales under-16 side as they defeated Northern Ireland under-16 side 3–1 to retain the Victory Shield. He has also represented Wales at under-19 and under-21 level.

In June 2021, Spence was shown a red card whilst representing the U21 team in a 0–0 draw with Moldova. Spence was shown a second yellow card for what was deemed to be simulation, despite having to leave the field on a stretcher on account of the challenge in the opposing penalty area. In October 2021, Spence was called up to the Wales squad for the 2023 UEFA European Under-21 Championship qualifying matches against Moldova and Netherlands on 8 and 12 October 2021 respectively, featuring off of the bench in the 5–0 defeat in the second of the two matches.

== Career statistics ==
As of end of 2024–25 season

Appearances and goals by club, season and competition
Club	Season	League			FA Cup		League Cup		Other		Total	
Club	Season	Division	Apps	Goals	Apps	Goals	Apps	Goals	Apps	Goals	Apps	Goals
Cardiff City	2019–20	Championship	0	0	0	0	0	0	0	0	0	0
Barry Town United (loan)	2019–20	Cymru Premier	13	1	0	0	0	0	0	0	13	1
Crystal Palace	2020–21	Premier League	0	0	0	0	0	0	0	0	0	0
Crystal Palace	2021–22	Premier League	0	0	0	0	0	0	0	0	0	0
Crystal Palace	Total		0	0	0	0	0	0	0	0	0	0
Bristol Rovers (loan)	2021–22	League Two	6	1	3	2	1	0	2 (Note: Appearance(s) in EFL Trophy)	0	12	3
Gloucester City	2022–23	National League North	18	5	0	0	—		1 (Note: Appearance (1 goal) in National League North play-offs)	1	19	6
King's Lynn Town	2023–24	National League North	12	0	0	0	—		0	0	12	0
Havant & Waterlooville	2023–24	National League South	16	1	0	0	—		0	0	16	1
Hednesford Town	2024–25	Northern Premier League Division One West	20	3	9	1	—		6 (Note: Two appearances in FA Trophy, two appearances in Walsall Senior Cup, one appearance and two goals in Birmingham Senior Cup, one appearance in Staffordshire Senior Cup)	2	35	6
Career total			85	11	12	3	1	0	9	3	107	17
