= Trevor Clarke (footballer) =

Irish footballer (born 1998)

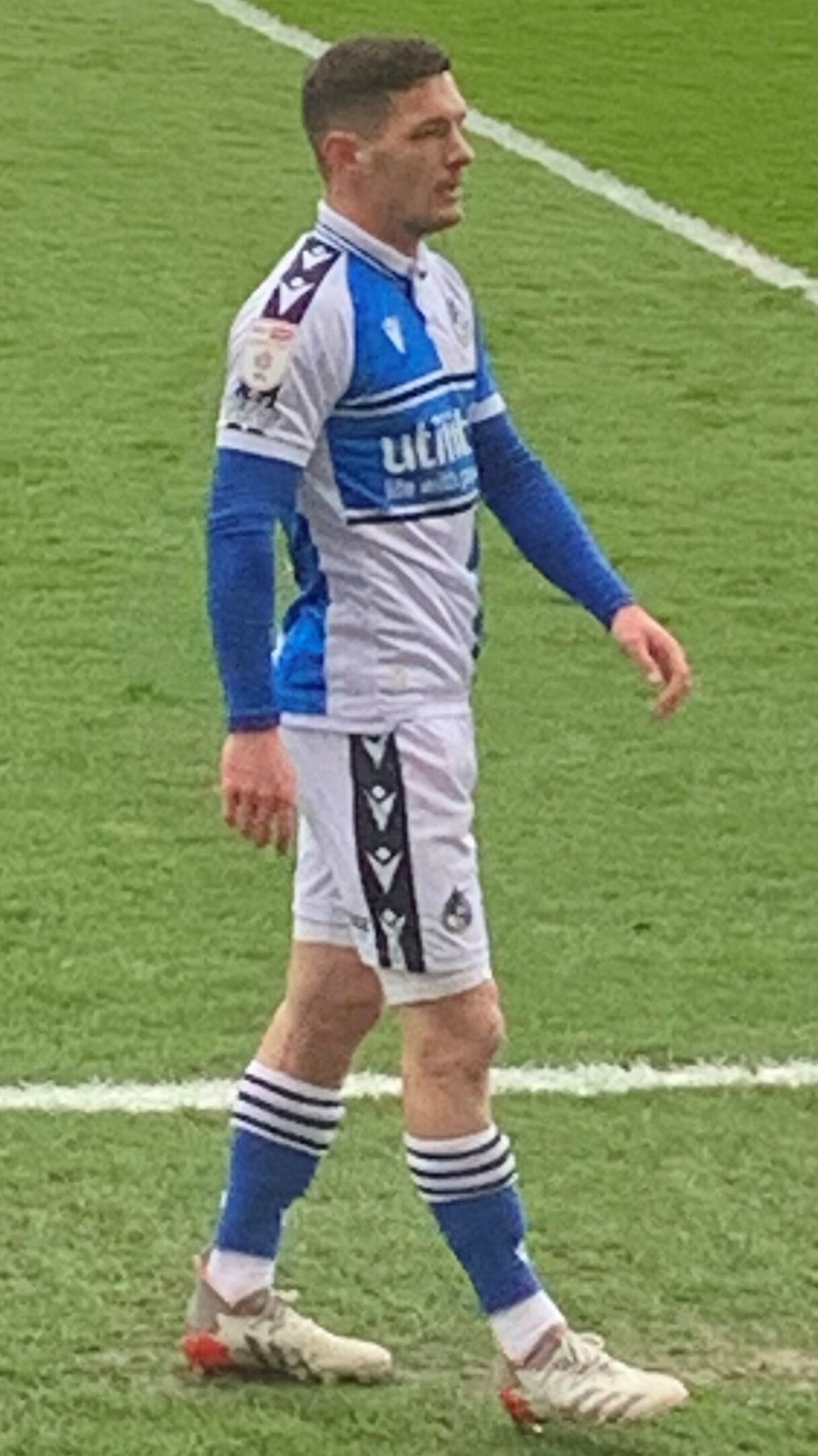
- Clarke at Bristol Rovers in 2022

Personal information
- Full name: Trevor Thomas Clarke
- Date of birth: 26 March 1998 (age 28)
- Place of birth: Dublin, Ireland
- Height: 1.75 m (5 ft 9 in)
- Positions: Left-back; midfielder

Team information
- Current team: Dundalk
- Number: 15

Youth career
- Crumlin United
- –2014: St Kevin's Boys
- 2014–2015: Middlesbrough
- 2015–2016: Shamrock Rovers

Senior career*
Years	Team	Apps	(Gls)
2016–2019	Shamrock Rovers	80	(5)
2019–2021	Rotherham United	17	(0)
2021–2024	Bristol Rovers	14	(0)
2023	→ Shamrock Rovers (loan)	20	(5)
2024–2026	Shamrock Rovers	28	(0)
2026–	Dundalk	13	(1)

International career
- Republic of Ireland U15
2014–2015	Republic of Ireland U17	12	(11)
2015–2017	Republic of Ireland U19	7	(0)
2019	Republic of Ireland U21	1	(0)
- * Club domestic league appearances and goals as of 16:56, 10 November 2026 (UTC)

Trevor Thomas Clarke (born 26 March 1998) is an Irish professional footballer who plays as a left-back for League of Ireland Premier Division club Dundalk.

== Club career ==
=== Early career ===
Clarke started his football career with Crumlin United, before moving to St. Kevin's Boys in the North Dublin suburb of Whitehall. His performances earned him a move to England with Middlesbrough, where he played for their Under-18's. He was released in July 2015 and returned home.

=== Shamrock Rovers ===
Clarke joined Shamrock Rovers in September 2015 from Middlesbrough. He played for the Rovers Under-19's for a short time before stepping up to the first team at the start of 2016. He made 80 league appearances for the club during the four seasons from 2016 to 2019, and also featured in the UEFA Europa League. In 2017 he was a transfer target for Southampton, Sheffield United and Barnsley.

=== Rotherham United ===
Clarke signed for Rotherham United on 29 July 2019, for an undisclosed fee, on a three-year contract. He was expected to be in contention for an immediate first-team place, but suffered a knee injury during a behind-closed-doors match on the same day his signing was announced. He finally made his debut in the 2019–20 EFL Trophy game against Doncaster Rovers on 8 October 2019, creating a goal and then scoring the winner.

=== Bristol Rovers ===
On 9 July 2021, Clarke joined League Two side Bristol Rovers on a one-year deal, signing for an undisclosed fee. Clarke made his debut for the club on the opening day of the season however was forced off with a groin injury after only 32 minutes. Clarke made his return from injury on 13 October when he played the first hour of an EFL Trophy defeat to Chelsea U21s. On 19 October he made his return to league action, coming off of the bench in the 82 minute before being shown a red card in the 91st minute for an off the ball incident with Junior Tchamadeu where Clarke was seen to throw a punch at his Colchester United counterpart, who was also sent off. Clarke's groin injury problems continued into the new year and in January he was again ruled out for over a month after undergoing surgery. Having achieved promotion on the final day of the 2021–22 season, Clarke signed a new two-year contract with the club with the option for a further year on 3 June 2022.

Clarke started the opening match of the season as Rovers were defeated 2–1 by Forest Green Rovers. Following the match Clarke's manager Joey Barton said that if he had been told at the end of the previous season that Clarke would have been included in the starting eleven, then his response would have been that the club "must have had a bad summer". On 4 August 2022, Barton revealed that Clarke was one of three players to be training away from the first-team that had been told that they can leave the club. With the transfer window drawing to a close however, Clarke was reintegrated back into the squad with a transfer away not having been found. On 4 October 2022, Clarke scored his first goal for the club when he fired home from the edge of the box on his weaker right foot in a 2–0 EFL Trophy victory over Crystal Palace U21. Having forced his way back into the team, a freak training injury for Clarke in December 2022 left him with a torn groin muscle, keeping him out of action until February 2023.

=== Shamrock Rovers return ===
On 6 January 2023, Clarke returned to former club Shamrock Rovers on loan for the 2023 season. In June 2023, Hoops head coach Stephen Bradley confirmed that Clarke had suffered an injury that would see him out of action until at least September. Having made his return in late August, the club went on to win their fourth consecutive league title.

Following his return to Bristol Rovers, new manager Matt Taylor confirmed that Clarke was likely to leave the club in the January transfer window. His contract was terminated by mutual consent on 13 January 2024. That same day, his permanent return to Shamrock Rovers was announced on a long-term contract.

=== Dundalk ===
On 2 July 2026, Clarke signed for fellow League of Ireland Premier Division club Dundalk on an 18-month contract.

== International career ==
Clarke has played for Ireland from Under 15s level right up to the Republic of Ireland U21s, earning 12 caps and 5 goals for the Under-17s, 7 caps for Under-19s and 1 cap for the Under-21s in 2019.

== Personal life ==
In June 2023, he was fined €250 following a court appearance over Clarke fleeing the scene of a collision between his vehicle and a Dublin Bus at Fonthill Road in Clondalkin on 15 May 2020, with the judge stating that he could not apply the Probation Act as it cannot be applied to penalty point offences.

== Career statistics ==
As of match played 30 October 2026

Appearances and goals by club, season and competition
Club	Season	League			National cup (Note: Includes FAI Cup & FA Cup)		League cup (Note: Includes League of Ireland Cup & EFL Cup)		Europe		Other		Total	
Club	Season	Division	Apps	Goals	Apps	Goals	Apps	Goals	Apps	Goals	Apps	Goals	Apps	Goals
Shamrock Rovers	2016	LOI Premier Division	26	1	2	0	3	1	1 (Note: Appearances in the UEFA Europa League)	0	1 (Note: Appearances in the Leinster Senior Cup)	0	33	2
Shamrock Rovers	2017	LOI Premier Division	27	3	5	0	3	0	4	0	0	0	39	3
Shamrock Rovers	2018	LOI Premier Division	6	0	0	0	0	0	0	0	0	0	6	0
Shamrock Rovers	2019	LOI Premier Division	21	1	0	0	1	0	1	0	0	0	23	1
Shamrock Rovers	Total		80	5	7	0	7	1	6	0	1	0	101	6
Rotherham United	2019–20	League One	8	0	1	0	0	0	—		1 (Note: Appearances in the EFL Trophy)	1	10	1
Rotherham United	2020–21	Championship	9	0	1	0	0	0	—		—		10	0
Rotherham United	Total		17	0	2	0	0	0	—		1	1	20	1
Bristol Rovers	2021–22	League Two	7	0	1	0	0	0	—		1	0	9	0
Bristol Rovers	2022–23	League One	9	0	2	0	0	0	—		4	1	15	1
Bristol Rovers	2023–24	League One	0	0	0	0	—		—		—		0	0
Bristol Rovers	Total		16	0	3	0	0	0	—		5	1	24	1
Shamrock Rovers (loan)	2023	LOI Premier Division	20	5	0	0	—		0	0	1 (Note: Appearances in President of Ireland's Cup)	0	21	5
Shamrock Rovers	2024	LOI Premier Division	21	0	1	0	—		10 (Note: 4 appearances in the UEFA Champions League; 3 appearances in the UEFA Europa League; 3 appearances in the UEFA Conference League)	0	1	2	33	2
Shamrock Rovers	2025	LOI Premier Division	6	0	1	0	—		1 (Note: Appearances in the UEFA Conference League)	0	0	0	8	0
Shamrock Rovers	2026	LOI Premier Division	1	0	—		—		—		0	0	1	0
Shamrock Rovers	Total		28	0	2	0	—		11	0	1	2	42	2
Dundalk	2026	LOI Premier Division	13	1	2	1	—		—		—		15	2
Career total			174	11	16	1	7	1	17	0	9	4	223	17

== Honours ==
Bristol Rovers

- EFL League Two third-place promotion: 2021–22

Shamrock Rovers

- League of Ireland Premier Division: 2023

Individual

- PFAI Young Player of the Year: 2017
- PFAI Premier Division Team of the Year: 2017
