= Zain Walker =

English footballer (born 2002)

Personal information
- Full name: Zain Alexander Walker
- Date of birth: 8 January 2002 (age 24)
- Place of birth: Wandsworth, England
- Height: 5 ft 8 in (1.73 m)
- Position: Midfielder

Youth career
- Fulham
- Bristol Rovers

Senior career*
Years	Team	Apps	(Gls)
2018–2022	Bristol Rovers	11	(0)
2021	→ King's Lynn Town (loan)	4	(0)
2021	→ Chippenham Town (loan)	1	(0)
2022–2023	King's Lynn Town	21	(0)
2023–2024	Aldershot Town	0	(0)
2023–2024	→ Bishop's Stortford (loan)	19	(1)
2024	→ Bishop's Stortford (loan)	2	(0)
2024–2025	Welling United	24	(3)
2025	Sittingbourne	0	(0)
2025	Kingstonian	1	(0)
- * Club domestic league appearances and goals as of 11:46, 24 May 2026 (UTC)

Zain Alexander Walker (born 8 January 2002) is an English professional footballer who plays as a midfielder.

== Career ==
=== Bristol Rovers ===
Born in Wandsworth, Walker began his career with Fulham, moving to Bristol Rovers at the age of 16. He made his debut on 13 November 2018 in the EFL Trophy, one of four Bristol Rovers players (alongside Tareiq Holmes-Dennis, Connor Jones and Theo Widdrington) to do so in that match. Walker also became the first player born in the 2000s to play for Bristol Rovers.

On 4 September 2020, Walker signed a new two-year deal contract with Rovers with an option for a further year, following an impressive pre-season. Walker made his first league appearance for the club in a 4–1 defeat to Doncaster Rovers coming off of the bench in the 74 minute. Having featured off of the bench a few times, Rovers' third manager of the season Joey Barton promoted both Walker and fellow Development Squad player Pablo Martinez to train with the first team in early March 2021 as Rovers fought to avoid relegation. Walker made his full debut for the club when he started on 27 March 2021 in a 1–0 home defeat to Sunderland.

On 8 September 2021, Walker joined National League side King's Lynn Town on a one-month youth loan deal. He made his debut that weekend, starting and playing 66 minutes of a 2–1 defeat to Dagenham & Redbridge.

On 12 November 2021, Walker joined National League South side Chippenham Town on loan along with his Rovers teammate Cameron Hargreaves. He made his debut the following day but was forced off after 30 minutes with a muscle injury.

=== King's Lynn Town ===
On 19 January 2022, Walker joined National League side King's Lynn Town for an undisclosed fee having spent time on loan there earlier in the season.

=== Aldershot Town ===
In July 2023, Walker signed for National League club Aldershot Town on a one-year deal, reuniting with former King's Lynn manager Tommy Widdrington.

On 2 August 2023, he joined National League North club Bishop's Stortford on loan until January 2024. The loan ended in January 2024. He returned to the club the following month on loan until the end of the season.

Walker was released by Aldershot upon the expiration of his contract at the end of the 2023–24 season.

=== Welling United ===
On 31 May 2024, Walker joined National League South club Welling United.

=== Later career ===
In June 2025, Walker joined Isthmian League South East Division side Sittingbourne. Having failed to make an appearance for the Brickies, he joined Kingstonian in September 2025 where he made one appearance.

== Career statistics ==
As of end of 2023–24 season

Appearances and goals by club, season and competition
Club	Season	League			FA Cup		League Cup		Other		Total	
Club	Season	Division	Apps	Goals	Apps	Goals	Apps	Goals	Apps	Goals	Apps	Goals
Bristol Rovers	2018–19	League One	0	0	0	0	0	0	1 (Note: Appearance(s) in EFL Trophy.)	0	1	0
Bristol Rovers	2019–20	League One	0	0	0	0	0	0	0	0	0	0
Bristol Rovers	2020–21	League One	11	0	0	0	0	0	4	0	15	0
Bristol Rovers	2021–22	League Two	0	0	0	0	0	0	2	0	2	0
Bristol Rovers	Total		11	0	0	0	0	0	7	0	18	0
King's Lynn Town (loan)	2021–22	National League	4	0	0	0	—		0	0	4	0
Chippenham Town (loan)	2021–22	National League South	1	0	—		—		0	0	1	0
King's Lynn Town	2021–22	National League	7	0	—		—		0	0	7	0
King's Lynn Town	2022–23	National League North	14	0	3	0	—		1 (Note: Appearance(s) in FA Trophy)	0	18	0
King's Lynn Town	Total		21	0	3	0	0	0	1	0	25	0
Aldershot Town	2023–24	National League	0	0	0	0	—		0	0	0	0
Bishop's Stortford (loan)	2023–24	National League North	21	1	0	0	—		3	0	24	1
Career total			58	1	3	0	0	0	11	0	72	1
