= Ryan Jones (footballer, born 2002) =

English footballer

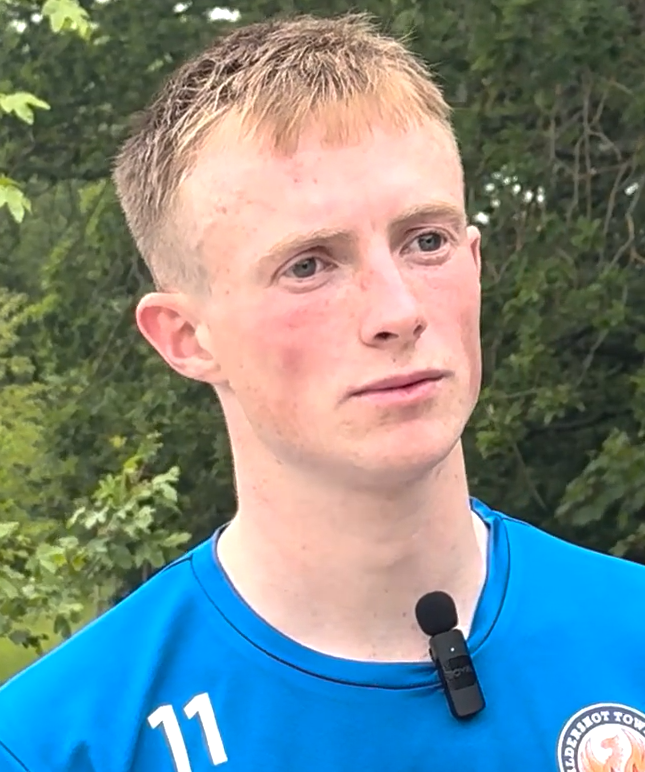
- Jones in 2024

Personal information
- Full name: Ryan Mark Jones
- Date of birth: 23 May 2002 (age 24)
- Place of birth: Bath, England
- Height: 1.77 m (5 ft 10 in)
- Positions: Midfielder; defender

Team information
- Current team: Yeovil Town
- Number: 10

Youth career
- Weston-super-Mare
- –2019: Clevedon Town

Senior career*
Years	Team	Apps	(Gls)
2019	Clevedon Town	5	(2)
2019–2020	Weston-super-Mare	10	(2)
2020–2024	Bristol Rovers	0	(0)
2020	→ Weston-super-Mare (loan)	2	(0)
2022	→ Bath City (loan)	10	(0)
2022–2023	→ Hungerford Town (loan)	34	(5)
2023–2024	→ Bromley (loan)	4	(0)
2024–2026	Aldershot Town	57	(7)
2026–	Yeovil Town	37	(5)
- * Club domestic league appearances and goals as of 22:30, 21 November 2026 (UTC)

Ryan Mark Jones (born 23 May 2002) is an English footballer who plays as a defender or midfielder for National League club Yeovil Town.

== Career ==
Jones spent time in the youth teams of both Weston-super-Mare and Clevedon Town, he made his debut for the latter in the Western League in March 2019 before re-joining Weston-super-Mare. Jones broke through at Weston-super-Mare during the 2019–20 season, being named on the bench for a large proportion of fixtures. On 26 October 2019, Jones scored his first senior goal in a 3–2 FA Trophy defeat to AFC Totton. His goal in the 6th minute of extra time gave his side a 2–1 lead before Totton responded twice to win the match and progress. His first league goal came in February 2020 with the fifth goal in a 5–0 thrashing of Wimborne Town.

=== Bristol Rovers ===
On 16 October 2020, Jones joined League One side Bristol Rovers for an undisclosed fee on a three-year deal before immediately being loaned back to Weston-super-Mare for the season.

Jones enjoyed somewhat of a breakthrough pre-season heading into the 2021–22 season and on 10 August 2021, made his debut when he came off the bench in a 2–0 EFL Cup defeat to Cheltenham Town. He scored his first goal for the club in a 5–3 EFL Trophy defeat to Exeter City, also assisting his side's third goal.

On 18 February 2022, Jones joined National League South side Bath City on a one-month loan deal, making his debut the following day in a 2–0 defeat to Dartford. On 21 March, this loan was extended until the end of the season.

On 26 September 2022, Jones signed for National League South club Hungerford Town on a one-month loan deal. With the deal having been extended until the end of the season, Jones impressed in Hungerford's relegation battle, being described as "one of the best talents" his manager had worked with. Having started the loan spell at left back, he was moved further forward, allowing him to add more goals to his game as well as improving on his physicality. His form saw him named the club's player of the month award for March 2023. The season ended with Hungerford's relegation being confirmed on 22 April 2023 following a 1–1 draw with Dulwich Hamlet, the season bringing individual success however, as he was awarded with the club's Young Player of the Season award following the match. He was offered a new contract by Bristol Rovers in May 2023, signing a one-year deal on 9 June.

On 1 September 2023, Jones joined National League club Bromley on loan until 7 January 2024. Injuries meant that he had to wait until 7 October to make his debut for the club, starting a 2–2 draw with York City. On 8 January 2024, his loan was extended until the end of the season. In February 2024, Bristol Rovers manager Matt Taylor confirmed that the player was back training with his parent club having been told he was no longer needed by Bromley. He was released at the end of the 2023–24 season.

=== Aldershot Town ===
On 1 July 2024, Jones joined National League club Aldershot Town on a two-year deal. In April 2025, Jones suffered a fractured tibia that would rule him out for the remainder of the season.

=== Yeovil Town ===
On 16 January 2026, Jones signed for fellow National League club Yeovil Town for an undisclosed "five-figure sum", agreeing a contract until the end of the 2027–28 season.

Having made an impressive start to the 2026–27 season, he signed a new contract in October 2026, keeping him at the club until 2029.

== Career statistics ==
As of match played 21 November 2026

Appearances and goals by club, season and competition
Club	Season	League			FA Cup		EFL Cup		Other		Total	
Club	Season	Division	Apps	Goals	Apps	Goals	Apps	Goals	Apps	Goals	Apps	Goals
Clevedon Town	2018–19	Western League Premier Division	5	2	—		—		—		5	2
Weston-super-Mare	2019–20	Southern League Premier Division South	7	1	2	0	—		5 (Note: One appearance and one goal in FA Trophy, two appearances and one goal in Southern League Cup, two appearances in Somerset Premier Cup)	2	14	3
Weston-super-Mare	2020–21	Southern League Premier Division South	3	1	2	0	—		0	0	5	1
Weston-super-Mare	Total		10	2	4	0	—		5	2	19	4
Bristol Rovers	2020–21	EFL League One	0	0	0	0	0	0	0	0	0	0
Bristol Rovers	2021–22	EFL League Two	0	0	2	0	1	0	2 (Note: Appearance(s) in EFL Trophy)	1	5	1
Bristol Rovers	2022–23	EFL League One	0	0	0	0	1	0	1	0	2	0
Bristol Rovers	2023–24	EFL League One	0	0	0	0	0	0	0	0	0	0
Bristol Rovers	Total		0	0	2	0	2	0	3	1	7	1
Weston-super-Mare (loan)	2020–21	Southern League Premier Division South	2	0	1	0	—		2 (Note: Appearances in FA Trophy)	0	5	0
Bath City (loan)	2021–22	National League South	10	0	—		—		1 (Note: Appearance(s) in Somerset Premier Cup)	0	11	0
Hungerford Town (loan)	2022–23	National League South	34	5	0	0	—		4	2	38	7
Bromley (loan)	2023–24	National League	4	0	1	0	—		3 (Note: One appearance and one goal in FA Trophy, one appearance in London Senior Cup, one appearance in Kent Senior Cup)	1	8	1
Aldershot Town	2024–25	National League	40	6	1	0	—		12 (Note: Five appearances and two goals in National League Cup, four appearances and two goals in FA Trophy, three appearances and one goal in Hampshire Senior Cup)	5	53	11
Aldershot Town	2025–26	National League	17	1	1	0	—		1	0	19	1
Aldershot Town	Total		57	7	2	0	—		13	5	72	12
Yeovil Town	2025–26	National League	19	2	—		—		—		19	2
Yeovil Town	2026–27	National League	18	3	3	1	—		1	1	20	5
Yeovil Town	Total		37	5	3	1	—		1	1	41	7
Career total			159	21	13	1	2	0	32	12	206	34

== Honours ==
Aldershot Town

- FA Trophy: 2024–25

Individual

- Hungerford Town Young Player of the Season: 2022–23
