= Jed Ward =

English footballer (born 2003)

Personal information
- Full name: Jed Macaulay Ward
- Date of birth: 20 May 2003 (age 23)
- Place of birth: Bristol, England
- Position: Goalkeeper

Team information
- Current team: Walsall
- Number: 1

Youth career
- 2011–2021: Bristol Rovers

Senior career*
Years	Team	Apps	(Gls)
2021–2026	Bristol Rovers	38	(0)
2022	→ Swindon Supermarine (loan)	3	(0)
2022	→ Prescot Cables (loan)	3	(0)
2022–2023	→ Hungerford Town (loan)	24	(0)
2023	→ Wealdstone (loan)	19	(0)
2024–2025	→ Forest Green Rovers (loan)	28	(0)
2025–2026	→ Yeovil Town (loan)	46	(0)
2026–	Walsall	10	(0)

International career^{‡}
2024	England U20	2	(0)
- * Club domestic league appearances and goals as of 21:05, 17 October 2026 (UTC) ‡ National team caps and goals as of 08:26, 12 June 2024 (UTC)

Jed Macauley Ward (born 20 May 2003) is an English footballer who plays as a goalkeeper for EFL League Two club Walsall.

== Club career ==
=== Bristol Rovers ===
Ward joined local Bristol side Bradley Stoke United before being scouted at a local chess club and joining Bristol Rovers at the age of eight, joining the under-9 team. On 5 February 2021, Ward signed his first professional contract with the club aged 17.

On 9 May 2021, with Rovers already relegated, Ward made his professional debut on the final day of the season against Blackpool as they lost 1–0.

On 21 January 2022, Ward joined Southern League Premier Division South club Swindon Supermarine on a one-month loan deal, joining fellow Rovers youngsters Kieran Phillips and Tom Mehew at the club. Ward was recalled from his loan spell on 3 February.

On 17 February he joined Prescot Cables on loan for a month. He returned to his parent club in early March.

On 12 August 2022, Ward joined National League South club Hungerford Town on a one-month youth loan deal. On 7 September 2022, this deal was extended until the end of the season. Whilst on loan with the club suffering from a broken hand, Ward signed a new contract with his parent club that would keep him at Rovers until 2024 with the option for a further extension. Despite Hungerford's relegation battle, he impressed with his manager referring to him as an "ultimate professional" and "a very good up-and-coming goalkeeper". He was recalled from his loan with immediate effect on 7 April, with manager Barton later promising to involve him at some point in the last five matches of the season. On 22 April, he made his first performance since returning to the club, featuring in a 2–0 defeat to Port Vale, with manager Barton impressed by his performance despite the scoreline, tipping him to be a future first-choice goalkeeper for the club.

On 25 July 2023, Ward signed for National League club Wealdstone on a season-long loan deal. He was recalled by his parent club on 14 November 2023, featuring that night in an EFL Trophy tie with Newport County.

On 27 January 2024, Ward made his home league debut for the club in a 3–1 victory over Oxford United, impressing with a man-of-the-match performance. Having firmly established himself as first-choice goalkeeper, he signed a new four-year contract on 28 March 2024. At the club's end of season awards ceremony, Ward was awarded the Young Player of the Year award.

Following the loan signing of Josh Griffiths, Bristol Rovers' manager Matt Taylor revealed that the long-term plan was for Ward to be loaned out to continue his development. On 31 July 2024, he joined National League side Forest Green Rovers on a season-long loan deal. Ward was recalled on 3 February 2025 following Griffiths' recall by West Bromwich Albion.

On 1 August 2025, Ward joined National League club Yeovil Town on a season-long loan. Following an impressive season with the club, he was named Player of the Season at the end of season awards.

Following the conclusion of the 2025–26 season, Ward was named as one of seven players made available to depart Bristol Rovers, either permanently or on loan.

=== Walsall ===
On 10 July 2026, Ward signed for fellow League Two club Walsall on a three-year deal for an undisclosed fee.

== International career ==
On 21 May 2021, the day after he turned 18, Ward was called up to the England U19 training camp, to be held at St George's Park.

In March 2024, Ward received a first call-up for the England U20 squad. On 7 June 2024, Ward made his U20 debut during a 2–1 win over Sweden at Stadion ŠRC Sesvete.

== Career statistics ==
As of match played 17 October 2026

Appearances and goals by club, season and competition
Club	Season	League			FA Cup		League Cup		Other		Total	
Club	Season	Division	Apps	Goals	Apps	Goals	Apps	Goals	Apps	Goals	Apps	Goals
Bristol Rovers	2020–21	League One	1	0	0	0	0	0	0	0	1	0
Bristol Rovers	2021–22	League Two	0	0	0	0	0	0	3 (Note: Appearance(s) in EFL Trophy)	0	3	0
Bristol Rovers	2022–23	League One	1	0	0	0	0	0	0	0	1	0
Bristol Rovers	2023–24	League One	18	0	0	0	0	0	1	0	19	0
Bristol Rovers	2024–25	League One	18	0	0	0	0	0	0	0	18	0
Bristol Rovers	2025–26	League Two	0	0	0	0	0	0	0	0	0	0
Bristol Rovers	Total		38	0	0	0	0	0	4	0	42	0
Swindon Supermarine (loan)	2021–22	SL Premier Division South	3	0	0	0	—		0	0	3	0
Prescot Cables (loan)	2021–22	NPL Division One West	3	0	0	0	—		0	0	3	0
Hungerford Town (loan)	2022–23	National League South	24	0	0	0	—		3 (Note: Appearance(s) in FA Trophy)	0	27	0
Wealdstone (loan)	2023–24	National League	19	0	1	0	—		0	0	20	0
Forest Green Rovers (loan)	2024–25	National League	28	0	0	0	—		3	0	31	0
Yeovil Town (loan)	2025–26	National League	46	0	1	0	—		4	0	51	0
Walsall	2026–27	League Two	10	0	0	0	2	0	0	0	12	0
Career total			171	0	2	0	2	0	14	0	189	0

== Honours ==
Individual

- Bristol Rovers Young Player of the Year: 2023–24
- Yeovil Town Player of the Year: 2025–26
