= Niall Lovelock =

English footballer

Personal information
- Full name: Niall Christopher Lovelock
- Position: Central defender

Team information
- Current team: Eastern Florida State College

Youth career
- Bath City
- 2020–2021: Bristol Rovers

College career
Years	Team	Apps	(Gls)
2023–	Eastern Florida State College		

Senior career*
Years	Team	Apps	(Gls)
2021–2022	Bristol Rovers	0	(0)
2021	→ Cirencester Town (loan)	1	(0)
2022	Larkhall Athletic	2	(0)
2022–2023	Keynsham Town		
- * Club domestic league appearances and goals as of 19:36, 1 March 2023

Niall Christopher Lovelock is an English footballer who plays as a defender for Eastern Florida State College.

== Career ==
Lovelock signed as a scholar for Bristol Rovers in May 2020 having previously played for Bath City.

On 13 October 2021, Lovelock made his senior debut in an EFL Trophy tie against Chelsea U21s when he equalised for the opposition, turning the ball into his own net as the academy side defeated Lovelock's side 2–1.

In November 2021, Lovelock joined Cirencester Town on loan.

Following his release from Bristol Rovers at the end of the 2021–22 season, Lovelock joined Larkhall Athletic, joining Keynsham Town in October. In March 2023, Lovelock agreed to join Eastern Florida State College at the end of the season on a scholarship.

== Career statistics ==
As of match played 13 November 2021

Appearances and goals by club, season and competition
Club	Season	League			FA Cup		League Cup		Other		Total	
Club	Season	Division	Apps	Goals	Apps	Goals	Apps	Goals	Apps	Goals	Apps	Goals
Bristol Rovers	2021–22	League Two	0	0	0	0	0	0	1 (Note: Appearance(s) in EFL Trophy)	0	1	0
Cirencester Town (loan)	2021–22	Southern Division One South	1	0	0	0	—		0	0	1	0
Career total			1	0	0	0	0	0	1	0	2	0
