= Pablo Martinez (Welsh footballer) =

Welsh footballer

Personal information
- Full name: Pablo Jacob Martinez
- Date of birth: 11 October 2000 (age 26)
- Place of birth: Oxford, England
- Height: 6 ft 1 in (1.86 m)
- Position: Central defender

Team information
- Current team: Chippenham Town

Youth career
- –2017: Reading
- 2017–2020: West Bromwich Albion

Senior career*
Years	Team	Apps	(Gls)
2020–2022	Bristol Rovers	9	(0)
2020–2021	→ Oxford City (loan)	9	(1)
2022	→ Gloucester City (loan)	10	(0)
2022–	Chippenham Town	2	(0)

International career
2017	Wales U17	2	(0)
2017–2018	Wales U19	7	(0)
- * Club domestic league appearances and goals as of 10:51, 28 April 2023 (UTC)

Pablo Jacob Martinez (born 11 October 2000) is a retired professional footballer. He played for various teams both as a defender or midfielder, and ended his career whilst playing for Chippenham Town. Born in England, he also represented Wales at youth international level.

== Career ==
=== Early career ===
Martinez came through the academy at West Bromwich Albion from the age of 16. He was released from the club at the end of the 2019–20 season, one of five third-year scholars to not be offered a new contract.

=== Bristol Rovers ===
Following his release from West Bromwich Albion, Martinez joined League One side Bristol Rovers in August 2020, initially joining up with the club's development squad. In early March 2021, Rovers' manager Joey Barton revealed that Martinez, along with fellow development squad player Zain Walker, had been training with the first-team squad. On 27 March 2021, Martinez made his debut for the club, playing the duration of a 1–0 home defeat to Sunderland. After making eight appearances for the League One side as they finished bottom and were relegated to League Two, the club exercised the option in Martinez's contract for another year. Martinez was released at the end of the 2021–22 season following Rovers' promotion back to League One.

==== Oxford City (loan) ====
On 23 October 2020, Martinez joined National League South side Oxford City on an initial three-month loan deal as they looked to gain promotion. He made his debut for the club the following week, coming off of the bench in a 2–0 home defeat to Hampton & Richmond Borough. He scored his first senior goal on 19 January 2021, in a 5–3 victory at Hemel Hempstead Town, Martinez scoring his side's first goal to pull the scores back to 2–1 with a strike from 35 yards out.

==== Gloucester City (loan) ====
On 4 March 2022, Martinez joined Gloucester City on a one-month loan deal having found first-team opportunities hard to come by. By joining the National League North club on loan, Martinez linked up with fellow Rovers loanees Lucas Tomlinson and Ollie Hulbert as well as being managed again by former Bristol Rovers Development Squad manager Lee Mansell.

=== Chippenham Town ===
Following his release from Bristol Rovers, he joined National League South side Chippenham Town on 15 July 2022 On 13 August 2022, Chippenham's home match against Chelmsford City was postponed after Martinez had collapsed 27 minutes into the match. Following the match, Martinez's club issued a statement that his condition was not life-threatening. On 19 August, a further statement was released stating that Martinez had been fitted with a small heart monitor and would likely be able to return to playing football. On 22 April 2023, he made his return to first-team football as a stoppage time substitute against Tonbridge Angels.

== Personal life ==
Pablo Martinez was born in Oxford, England to a Spanish father and Welsh mother and is eligible for all three national teams. He was educated at the European School, Culham and was a youth international for Wales.

== Career statistics ==
As of end of 2021–22 season

Appearances and goals by club, season and competition
Club	Season	League			FA Cup		League Cup		Other		Total	
Club	Season	Division	Apps	Goals	Apps	Goals	Apps	Goals	Apps	Goals	Apps	Goals
Bristol Rovers	2020–21	League One	8	0	0	0	0	0	0	0	8	0
Bristol Rovers	2021–22	League Two	1	0	1	0	0	0	2 (Note: Appearance(s) in EFL Trophy)	0	4	0
Bristol Rovers	Total		9	0	1	0	0	0	2	0	12	0
Oxford City (loan)	2020–21	National League South	9	1	1	0	—		2 (Note: Appearance(s) in FA Trophy)	0	12	1
Gloucester City (loan)	2021–22	National League North	10	0	—		—		0	0	10	0
Career Total			28	1	2	0	0	0	4	0	34	1
