= Connor Jones (footballer) =

English footballer (born 1998)

Personal information
- Full name: Connor Stephen Malcolm Jones
- Date of birth: 30 November 1998 (age 27)
- Position: Midfielder

Youth career
- Bristol Rovers

Senior career*
Years	Team	Apps	(Gls)
2016–2019	Bristol Rovers	0	(0)
2016–2017	→ Yate Town (loan)		
2017–2018	→ Mangotsfield United (loan)	23	(0)
2018	→ Mangotsfield United (loan)	3	(0)
- * Club domestic league appearances and goals as of 07:30, 22 August 2019 (UTC)

Connor Stephen Malcolm Jones (born 30 November 1998) is an English professional footballer who plays as a midfielder.

== Early and personal life ==
Jones' father died in January 2018; the police investigated it as murder.

== Career ==
Jones began his career at Bristol Rovers, spending time on loan at Yate Town during the 2016–17 season. He moved on loan to Mangotsfield United in November 2017, making 23 league appearances. He returned to Mangotsfield United for a second loan spell in March 2018, making a further 3 league appearances. He made his senior debut for Bristol Rovers on 13 November 2018 in the EFL Trophy, one of four Bristol Rovers players (alongside Tareiq Holmes-Dennis, Zain Walker and Theo Widdrington) to do so in that match.

He was released by Bristol Rovers at the end of the 2018–19 season.
