= Oliver Lobley =

English footballer

Personal information
- Date of birth: 23 March 2004 (age 22)
- Place of birth: Walesby, England
- Position: Defender

Team information
- Current team: Sherwood Colliery

Youth career
- Scunthorpe United

Senior career*
Years	Team	Apps	(Gls)
2022	Scunthorpe United	1	(0)
2022	Belper Town	4	(0)
2022–2023	Retford		
2023–	Sherwood Colliery		
- * Club domestic league appearances and goals as of 21:46, 21 October 2024 (UTC)

Oliver Lobley (born 23 March 2004) is an English footballer who plays as a defender for United Counties League Premier Division North club Sherwood Colliery.

== Career ==
Lobley joined Scunthorpe United at under-15 level. On 7 May 2022, Lobley made his league debut for Scunthorpe where he scored an own goal in a 7–0 loss against Bristol Rovers and was substituted after 27 minutes. On 10 May 2022, Scunthorpe announced Lobley was one of four second year scholars to be released by the club.

On 27 July 2022, Lobley joined Northern Premier League Premier Division club Belper Town. Lobley made four league appearances for Belper; he was sent off in his final match for the club – a 5–0 defeat against Warrington Rylands 1906 on 27 August 2022. He later moved to Retford in November and scored on his debut in a 2–1 win against Armthorpe Welfare on 6 November 2022. In late-2023, he joined Sherwood Colliery, helping the team to promotion in his first season.
