= Kieran Phillips (footballer, born 2002) =

English footballer (born 2002)

Personal information
- Full name: Kieran Lee Phillips
- Date of birth: 13 August 2002 (age 24)
- Place of birth: Bristol, England
- Height: 5 ft 11 in (1.81 m)
- Position: Forward

Youth career
- 2008–2020: Bristol Rovers

Senior career*
Years	Team	Apps	(Gls)
2020–2022	Bristol Rovers	0	(0)
2020–2021	→ Chippenham Town (loan)	4	(0)
2021	→ Dorchester Town (loan)	5	(2)
2021–2022	→ Swindon Supermarine (loan)	26	(11)
2022–2023	Gloucester City	32	(14)
2023–2024	Kidderminster Harriers	13	(1)
2023–2024	→ Havant & Waterlooville (loan)	12	(3)
2024	→ Hereford (loan)	12	(2)
2024–2026	Gloucester City	55	(11)
2025	→ Larkhall Athletic (loan)	7	(8)
- * Club domestic league appearances and goals as of 16:58, 21 August 2026 (UTC)

Kieran Lee Phillips (born 13 August 2002) is an English footballer who plays as a forward for Southern League Premier Division South club Gloucester City.

== Career ==
=== Bristol Rovers ===
He signed his first professional contract in February 2020; a two-year contract with League One side Bristol Rovers. This came after interest from Premier League side Southampton with Rovers rejecting two bids for the highly rated youngster.

He made his professional debut on 6 October 2020 as a substitute in a 1–1 EFL Trophy draw away to Oxford United winning a late penalty which was missed by Luke Leahy, before Rovers lost the resulting penalty shoot-out.

==== Chippenham Town (loan) ====
On 9 October 2020, Phillips joined National League South side Chippenham Town on loan until January 2021. Phillips made his debut the following day as a late substitute in a 1–0 win over Braintree Town.

==== Dorchester Town (loan) ====
On 10 September 2021, Phillips joined Southern Premier Division South side Dorchester Town on a one-month loan deal. He made his debut the following day, scoring a first-half brace in a 2–0 victory over Walton Casuals. Phillips returned to his parent club on 12 October 2021.

==== Swindon Supermarine (loan) ====
On 28 October 2021, Phillips joined seventh tier Swindon Supermarine on a one-month loan deal. Phillips made his debut against Dorchester on 6 November, making a goalscoring start to his loan-spell as he scored the only goal against his former club. After scoring seven goals in seven matches over the course of November, Phillips won the Swindon Supermarine Player of the Month award. On 8 December, Phillips extended his loan spell with the club until 1 January 2022. On 5 January, Phillips' loan deal was extended until the end of the season. Phillips' final game of his loan spell came in the 5–2 Wiltshire Premier Shield Final victory over Corsham Town, Phillips scoring the fourth goal.

Phillips was released at the end of the 2021–22 season.

=== Gloucester City ===
On 29 July 2022, Phillips joined National League North club Gloucester City following a successful trial period, linking up with former Bristol Rovers youth team coach Lee Mansell. A successful October saw Phillips win the league's player of the month award having scored six goals in four matches.

=== Kidderminster Harriers ===
On 1 June 2023, Phillips joined newly promoted National League club Kidderminster Harriers on a two-year deal.

On 7 November 2023, Phillips joined the National League South's bottom side Havant & Waterlooville on loan until January 2024. He returned to his parent club on 18 January 2024. On 30 January 2024, Phillips joined National League North club Hereford on loan until the end of the season.

On 21 June 2024, his contract at Harriers, which had one year remaining, was cancelled by mutual consent.

=== Return to Gloucester City ===
In June 2024, Phillips returned to Gloucester City following their relegation to the Southern League Premier Division South.

In November 2025, Phillips joined Southern League Division One South side Larkhall Athletic on a short-term loan until January 2026.

On 16 August 2026, Phillips departed the club to take a break from football due to personal circumstances.

== Career statistics ==
As of end of 2025–26 season

Appearances and goals by club, season and competition
Club	Season	League			FA Cup		League Cup		Other		Total	
Club	Season	Division	Apps	Goals	Apps	Goals	Apps	Goals	Apps	Goals	Apps	Goals
Bristol Rovers	2020–21	League One	0	0	0	0	0	0	1 (Note: Appearance(s) in Football League Trophy)	0	1	0
Bristol Rovers	2021–22	League Two	0	0	0	0	0	0	1	0	1	0
Bristol Rovers	Total		0	0	0	0	0	0	2	0	2	0
Chippenham Town (loan)	2020–21	National League South	4	0	1	0	—		0	0	5	0
Dorchester Town (loan)	2021–22	Southern Premier South	5	2	0	0	—		0	0	5	2
Swindon Supermarine (loan)	2021–22	Southern Premier South	26	11	0	0	—		7 (Note: Four appearances and four goals in Southern League Challenge Cup; three appearances and two goals in Wiltshire Premier Shield)	6	33	17
Gloucester City	2022–23	National League North	32	14	2	1	—		1 (Note: Appearance(s) in National League North play-offs)	1	35	16
Kidderminster Harriers	2023–24	National League	13	1	2	0	—		0	0	15	1
Havant & Waterlooville (loan)	2023–24	National League South	12	3	—		—		1 (Note: Appearance(s) in Hampshire Senior Cup)	0	13	3
Hereford (loan)	2023–24	National League North	12	2	—		—		—		12	2
Gloucester City	2024–25	Southern Premier South	32	4	2	0	—		2 (Note: One appearance in FA Trophy, one appearance in Southern League Premier Division South play-offs)	0	36	4
Gloucester City	2025–26	Southern Premier South	23	7	3	0	—		4 (Note: Two appearances in FA Trophy, two appearances in Southern League Premier Division South play-offs)	0	28	7
Gloucester City	Total		55	11	5	0	—		6	0	66	11
Larkhall Athletic	2025–26	Southern Division One South	7	8	—		—		—		7	8
Career total			166	52	10	1	0	0	17	7	193	60
