= List of EFL League Two clubs =

The following is a list of clubs who have played in the English Football League Two at any time since its formation in 2004 to the current season.

== Table ==
EFL League Two teams playing in the 2026–27 season are indicated in bold. If the longest spell is the current spell, this is indicated in bold, and if the highest finish is that of the most recent season, this is also in bold. A total of 71 teams have played in League Two. Clubs in italic no longer exist as the legal entities they competed as in League Two.

All statistics here refer to time in EFL League Two only, with the exception of 'Most recent finish' which refers to all levels of play, and 'Last promotion' which refers to the club's last promotion from the fifth tier of English football.

| Club | Town or city | Total seasons | Total spells | Longest spell | Promotion to league | Promotion from league | Relegation to league | Relegation from league | Years | Most recent finish | Highest finish |
|---|---|---|---|---|---|---|---|---|---|---|---|
| **Accrington Stanley** | Accrington | 16 | 2 | 12 | 2005–06 | 2017–18 | 2022–23 | Never Relegated | 2006–2018; **2023–** | 16th | 1st |
| AFC Wimbledon | London | 9 | 2 | 6 | 2010–11 | 2024–25 | 2021–22 | Never Relegated | 2011–2016; 2022–2025 | 19th League One | 19th League One |
| Aldershot Town | Aldershot | 5 | 1 | 5 | 2007–08 | Never Promoted | Never Relegated | 2012–13 | 2008–2013 | 20th National League | 6th |
| **Barnet** | Barnet | 13 | 3 | 8 | 2024–25 | Never Promoted | Never Relegated | 2017–18 | 2005–2013; 2015–2018; **2025–** | 8th | 12th |
| Barrow | Barrow-in-Furness | 6 | 1 | 6 | 2019–20 | Never Promoted | Never Relegated | 2025–26 | 2020–2026 | 24th (relegated) | 8th |
| Blackpool | Blackpool | 1 | 1 | 1 | Never Promoted | 2016–17 | 2015–16 | Never Relegated | 2016–2017 | 13th League One | 7th |
| Bolton Wanderers | Bolton | 1 | 1 | 1 | Never Promoted | 2020–21 | 2019–20 | Never Relegated | 2020–2021 | 5th League One | 3rd |
| Boston United | Boston | 3 | 1 | 3 | 2001–02 | Never Promoted | Never Relegated | 2006–07 | 2004–2007 | 12th National League | 12th |
| Bournemouth | Bournemouth | 2 | 1 | 2 | Never Promoted | 2009–10 | 2007–08 | Never Relegated | 2008–2010 | 6th Premier League | 2nd |
| Bradford City | Bradford | 12 | 2 | 6 | Never Promoted | 2024–25 | 2018–19 | Never Relegated | 2007–2013; 2019–2025 | 4th League One | 3rd |
| Brentford | London | 2 | 1 | 2 | Never Promoted | 2008–09 | 2006–07 | Never Relegated | 2007–2009 | 9th Premier League | 1st |
| **Bristol Rovers** | Bristol | 10 | 5 | 3 | 2014–15 | 2021–22 | 2024–25 | 2013–14 | 2004–2007; 2011–2014; 2015–2016; 2021–2022; **2025–** | 14th | 3rd |
| Bromley | London | 2 | 1 | 2 | 2023–24 | 2025–26 | Never Relegated | Never Relegated | 2024–2026 | 1st (promoted) | **1st** |
| Burton Albion | Burton upon Trent | 6 | 1 | 6 | 2008–09 | 2014–15 | Never Relegated | Never Relegated | 2009–2015 | 17th League One | 4th |
| Bury | Bury | 10 | 3 | 7 | Never Promoted | 2018–19 | 2017–18 | Never Relegated | 2004–2010; 2013–2015; 2018–2019 | 1st (promoted); Northern Premier League Division One West | 2nd |
| Cambridge United | Cambridge | 9 | 3 | 7 | 2013–14 | 2025–26 | 2024–25 | 2004–05 | 2004–2005; 2014–2021; 2025–2026 | 3rd (promoted) | 2nd |
| Carlisle United | Carlisle | 11 | 3 | 9 | 2004–05 | 2022–23 | 2023–24 | 2024–25 | 2005–2006; 2014–2023; 2024–2025 | 3rd National League | 1st |
| **Cheltenham Town** | Cheltenham | 16 | 4 | 6 | 2015–16 | 2020–21 | 2023–24 | 2014–15 | 2004–2006; 2009–2015; 2016–2021; **2024–** | 18th | 1st |
| Chester City | Chester | 5 | 1 | 5 | 2003–04 | Never Promoted | Never Relegated | 2008–09 | 2004–2009 | Defunct (2009–10) | 15th |
| **Chesterfield** | Chesterfield | 10 | 4 | 4 | 2023–24 | 2013–14 | 2016–17 | 2017–18 | 2007–2011; 2012–2014; 2017–2018; **2024–** | 6th | 1st |
| **Colchester United** | Colchester | 11 | 1 | **11** | 1991–92 | Never Promoted | 2015–16 | Never Relegated | **2016–** | 12th | 6th |
| Coventry City | Coventry | 1 | 1 | 1 | Never Promoted | 2017–18 | 2016–17 | Never Relegated | 2017–2018 | 1st (promoted); Championship | 6th |
| **Crawley Town** | Crawley | 12 | 3 | 9 | 2010–11 | 2023–24 | 2024–25 | Never Relegated | 2011–2012; 2015–2024; **2025–** | 22nd | 3rd |
| **Crewe Alexandra** | Crewe | 12 | 3 | **5** | Never Promoted | 2019–20 | 2021–22 | Never Relegated | 2009–2012; 2016–2020; **2022–** | 11th | 2nd |
| Dagenham & Redbridge | London | 8 | 2 | 5 | 2006–07 | 2009–10 | 2010–11 | 2015–16 | 2007–2010; 2011–2016 | 13th National League South | 7th |
| Darlington | Darlington | 6 | 1 | 6 | 1989–90 | Never Promoted | Never Relegated | 2009–10 | 2004–2010 | 9th National League North | 6th |
| Doncaster Rovers | Doncaster | 4 | 2 | 3 | 2002–03 | 2024–25 | 2021–22 | Never Relegated | 2016–2017; 2022–2025 | 14th League One | 3rd |
| **Exeter City** | Exeter | 12 | 3 | 10 | 2007–08 | 2021–22 | 2025–26 | Never Relegated | 2008–2009; 2012–2022; **2026–** | 21st (relegated); League One | 2nd |
| Forest Green Rovers | Nailsworth | 6 | 2 | 5 | 2016–17 | 2021–22 | 2022–23 | 2023–24 | 2017–2022; 2023–2024 | 7th National League | 1st |
| **Fleetwood Town** | Fleetwood | 5 | 2 | **3** | 2011–12 | 2013–14 | 2023–24 | Never Relegated | 2012–2014; **2024–** | 15th | 4th |
| **Gillingham** | Gillingham | 9 | 3 | **5** | Never Promoted | 2012–13 | 2021–22 | Never Relegated | 2008–2009; 2010–2013; **2022–** | 17th | 1st |
| **Grimsby Town** | Grimsby | 16 | 3 | 6 | 2021–22 | Never Promoted | Never Relegated | 2020–21 | 2004–2010; 2016–2021; **2022–** | 7th | 4th |
| Harrogate Town | Harrogate | 6 | 1 | 6 | 2019–20 | Never Promoted | Never Relegated | 2025–26 | 2020–2026 | 23rd (relegated) | 13th |
| Hartlepool United | Hartlepool | 7 | 3 | 4 | 2020–21 | 2006–07 | 2012–13 | 2022–23 | 2006–2007; 2013–2017; 2021–2023 | 9th National League | 2nd |
| Hereford United | Hereford | 5 | 2 | 4 | 2005–06 | 2007–08 | 2008–09 | 2011–12 | 2006–2008; 2009–2012 | Defunct (2014–15) | 3rd |
| Kidderminster Harriers | Kidderminster | 1 | 1 | 1 | 1999–2000 | Never Promoted | Never Relegated | 2004–05 | 2004–2005 | 3rd (promoted); National League North | 23rd |
| Leyton Orient | London | 8 | 3 | 2 | 2018–19 | 2022–23 | 2014–15 | 2016–17 | 2004–2006; 2015–2017; 2019–2023 | 20th League One | 1st |
| Lincoln City | Lincoln | 9 | 2 | 7 | 2016–17 | 2018–19 | Never Relegated | 2010–11 | 2004–2011; 2017–2019 | 1st (promoted); League One | 1st |
| Luton Town | Luton | 5 | 2 | 4 | 2013–14 | 2017–18 | 2007–08 | 2008–09 | 2008–2009; 2014–2018 | 7th League One | 2nd |
| Macclesfield Town | Macclesfield | 10 | 2 | 8 | 2017–18 | Never Promoted | Never Relegated | 2019–20 | 2004–2012; 2018–2020 | Defunct (2020–21) | 5th |
| Mansfield Town | Mansfield | 15 | 2 | 11 | 2012–13 | 2023–24 | Never Relegated | 2007–08 | 2004–2008; 2013–2024 | 10th League One | 4th |
| Milton Keynes Dons | Milton Keynes | 6 | 3 | 3 | Never Promoted | 2025–26 | 2022–23 | Never Relegated | 2006–2008; 2018–2019; 2023–2026 | 2nd (promoted) | 1st |
| Morecambe | Morecambe | 16 | 2 | 14 | 2006–07 | 2020–21 | 2022–23 | 2024–25 | 2007–2021; 2023–2025 | 22nd (relegated); National League North | 4th |
| **Newport County** | Newport, Wales | 14 | 1 | **14** | 2012–13 | Never Promoted | Never Relegated | Never Relegated | **2013–** | 20th | 5th |
| **Northampton Town** | Northampton | 14 | 5 | 7 | Never Promoted | 2022–23 | 2025–26 | Never Relegated | 2004–2006; 2009–2016; 2018–2020; 2021–2023; **2026–** | 24th (relegated); League One | 1st |
| Notts County | Nottingham | 13 | 3 | 6 | 2022–23 | 2025–26 | 2014–15 | 2018–19 | 2004–2010; 2015–2019; 2023–2026 | 5th (promoted) | 1st |
| **Oldham Athletic** | Oldham | 6 | 2 | 4 | 2024–25 | Never Promoted | 2017–18 | 2021–22 | 2018–2022; **2025–** | 10th | 14th |
| Oxford United | Oxford | 8 | 2 | 6 | 2009–10 | 2015–16 | Never Relegated | 2005–06 | 2004–2006; 2010–2016 | 22nd (relegated); Championship | 2nd |
| Peterborough United | Peterborough | 3 | 1 | 3 | Never Promoted | 2007–08 | 2004–05 | Never Relegated | 2005–2008 | 18th League One | 2nd |
| Plymouth Argyle | Plymouth | 7 | 2 | 6 | Never Promoted | 2019–20 | 2018–19 | Never Relegated | 2011–2017; 2019–2020 | 8th League One | 2nd |
| Portsmouth | Portsmouth | 4 | 1 | 4 | Never Promoted | 2016–17 | 2012–13 | Never Relegated | 2013–2017 | 18th Championship | 1st |
| **Port Vale** | Stoke-on-Trent | 12 | 4 | 5 | Never Promoted | 2024–25 | 2025–26 | Never Relegated | 2008–2013; 2017–2022; 2024–2025; **2026–** | 22nd (relegated); League One | 3rd |
| **Rochdale** | Rochdale | 11 | 4 | 6 | 2025–26 | 2013–14 | 2020–21 | 2022–23 | 2004–2010; 2012–2014; 2021–2023; **2026–** | 2nd (promoted); National League | 3rd |
| **Rotherham United** | Rotherham | 7 | 2 | 6 | Never Promoted | 2012–13 | 2025–26 | Never Relegated | 2007–2013; **2026–** | 23rd (relegated); League One | 2nd |
| Rushden & Diamonds | Irthlingborough | 2 | 1 | 2 | 2000–01 | Never Promoted | Never Relegated | 2005–06 | 2004–2006 | Defunct (2010–11) | 22nd |
| **Salford City** | Salford | 8 | 1 | **8** | 2018–19 | Never Promoted | Never Relegated | Never Relegated | **2019–** | 4th | **4th** |
| Scunthorpe United | Scunthorpe | 5 | 3 | 3 | Never Promoted | 2013–14 | 2018–19 | 2021–22 | 2004–2005; 2013–2014; 2019–2022 | 5th National League | 2nd |
| **Shrewsbury Town** | Shrewsbury | 11 | 3 | 8 | 2003–04 | 2014–15 | 2024–25 | Never Relegated | 2004–2012; 2014–2015; **2025–** | 19th | 2nd |
| Southend United | Southend-on-sea | 7 | 3 | 5 | Never Promoted | 2014–15 | 2019–20 | 2020–21 | 2004–2005; 2010–2015; 2020–2021 | 6th National League | 4th |
| Stevenage | Stevenage | 10 | 2 | 9 | 2009–10 | 2022–23 | 2013–14 | Never Relegated | 2010–2011; 2014–2023 | 6th League One | 6th |
| Stockport County | Stockport | 6 | 3 | 3 | 2021–22 | 2023–24 | 2009–10 | 2010–11 | 2005–2008; 2010–2011; 2022–2024 | 3rd League One | 1st |
| Sutton United | Sutton | 3 | 1 | 3 | 2020–21 | Never Promoted | Never Relegated | 2023–24 | 2021–2024 | 19th National League | 8th |
| Swansea City | Swansea, Wales | 1 | 1 | 1 | Never Promoted | 2004–05 | Never Relegated | Never Relegated | 2004–2005 | 11th Championship | 3rd |
| **Swindon Town** | Swindon | 11 | 4 | **6** | Never Promoted | 2019–20 | 2020–21 | Never Relegated | 2006–2007; 2011–2012; 2017–2020; **2021–** | 9th | 1st |
| Torquay United | Torquay | 7 | 2 | 5 | 2008–09 | Never Promoted | 2004–05 | 2013–14 | 2005–2007; 2009–2014 | 3rd National League South | 5th |
| **Tranmere Rovers** | Tranmere | 9 | 3 | **7** | 2017–18 | 2018–19 | 2019–20 | 2014–15 | 2014–2015; 2018–2019; **2020–** | 21st | 9th |
| **Walsall** | Walsall | 9 | 2 | **8** | Never Promoted | 2006–07 | 2018–19 | Never Relegated | 2006–2007; **2019–** | 13th | 1st |
| Wrexham | Wrexham, Wales | 4 | 2 | 3 | 2022–23 | 2023–24 | 2004–05 | 2007–08 | 2005–2008; 2023–2024 | 7th Championship | 2nd |
| Wycombe Wanderers | High Wycombe | 11 | 3 | 5 | 1992–93 | 2017–18 | 2011–12 | Never Relegated | 2004–2009; 2010–2011; 2012–2018 | 11th League One | 3rd |
| Yeovil Town | Yeovil | 5 | 2 | 4 | 2002–03 | 2004–05 | 2014–15 | 2018–19 | 2004–2005; 2015–2019 | 16th National League | 1st |
| **York City** | York | 5 | 2 | 4 | 2025–26 | Never Promoted | Never Relegated | 2015–16 | 2012–2016; **2026–** | 1st (promoted); National League | 7th |

== Overview of clubs by season ==
| Champions | Runners-up | Third place | Promoted via play-offs | Relegated |

| Club | 04 05 | 05 06 | 06 07 | 07 08 | 08 09 | 09 10 | 10 11 | 11 12 | 12 13 | 13 14 | 14 15 | 15 16 | 16 17 | 17 18 | 18 19 | 19 20 | 20 21 | 21 22 | 22 23 | 23 24 | 24 25 | 25 26 | 26 27 |
|---|---|---|---|---|---|---|---|---|---|---|---|---|---|---|---|---|---|---|---|---|---|---|---|
| Accrington Stanley | | | 20 | 17 | 16 | 15 | 5 | 14 | 18 | 15 | 17 | 4 | 13 | 1 | | | | | | 17 | 21 | 16 | |
| Aldershot Town | | | | | 15 | 6 | 14 | 11 | 24 | | | | | | | | | | | | | | |
| Barnet | | 18 | 14 | 12 | 17 | 21 | 22 | 22 | 23 | | | 15 | 15 | 23 | | | | | | | | 8 | |
| Barrow | | | | | | | | | | | | | | | | | 21 | 22 | 9 | 8 | 16 | 24 | |
| Blackpool | | | | | | | | | | | | | 7 | | | | | | | | | | |
| Bolton Wanderers | | | | | | | | | | | | | | | | | 3 | | | | | | |
| Boston United | 16 | 11 | 23 | | | | | | | | | | | | | | | | | | | | |
| AFC Bournemouth | | | | | 21 | 2 | | | | | | | | | | | | | | | | | |
| Bradford City | | | | 10 | 9 | 14 | 18 | 18 | 7 | | | | | | | 9 | 15 | 14 | 6 | 9 | 3 | | |
| Brentford | | | | 14 | 1 | | | | | | | | | | | | | | | | | | |
| Bristol Rovers | 12 | 12 | 6 | | | | | 13 | 14 | 23 | | 3 | | | | | | 3 | | | | 14 | |
| Bromley | | | | | | | | | | | | | | | | | | | | | 11 | 1 | |
| Burton Albion | | | | | | 13 | 19 | 17 | 4 | 6 | 1 | | | | | | | | | | | | |
| Bury | 17 | 19 | 21 | 13 | 4 | 9 | 2 | | | 12 | 3 | | | | 2 | | | | | | | | |
| Cambridge United | 24 | | | | | | | | | | 19 | 9 | 11 | 12 | 21 | 16 | 2 | | | | | 3 | |
| Carlisle United | | 1 | | | | | | | | | 20 | 10 | 6 | 10 | 11 | 18 | 10 | 20 | 5 | | 23 | | |
| Cheltenham Town | 14 | 5 | | | | 22 | 17 | 6 | 5 | 17 | 23 | | 21 | 17 | 16 | 4 | 1 | | | | 15 | 18 | |
| Chester City | 20 | 15 | 18 | 22 | 23 | | | | | | | | | | | | | | | | | | |
| Chesterfield | | | | 8 | 10 | 8 | 1 | | 8 | 1 | | | | 24 | | | | | | | 7 | 6 | |
| Colchester United | | | | | | | | | | | | | 8 | 13 | 8 | 6 | 20 | 15 | 20 | 22 | 10 | 12 | |
| Coventry City | | | | | | | | | | | | | | 6 | | | | | | | | | |
| Crawley Town | | | | | | | | 3 | | | | 20 | 19 | 14 | 19 | 13 | 12 | 12 | 22 | 7 | | 22 | |
| Crewe Alexandra | | | | | | 18 | 10 | 7 | | | | | 17 | 15 | 12 | 2 | | | 13 | 6 | 13 | 11 | |
| Dagenham & Redbridge | | | | 20 | 8 | 7 | | 19 | 22 | 9 | 14 | 23 | | | | | | | | | | | |
| Darlington | 8 | 8 | 11 | 16 | 12 | 24 | | | | | | | | | | | | | | | | | |
| Doncaster Rovers | | | | | | | | | | | | | 3 | | | | | | 18 | 5 | 1 | | |
| Exeter City | | | | | 2 | | | | 10 | 16 | 11 | 14 | 5 | 4 | 9 | 5 | 9 | 2 | | | | | |
| Forest Green Rovers | | | | | | | | | | | | | | 21 | 5 | 10 | 6 | 1 | | 24 | | | |
| Fleetwood Town | | | | | | | | | 13 | 4 | | | | | | | | | | | 14 | 15 | |
| Gillingham | | | | | 5 | | 8 | 8 | 1 | | | | | | | | | | 17 | 12 | 17 | 17 | |
| Grimsby Town | 18 | 4 | 15 | 16 | 22 | 23 | | | | | | | 14 | 18 | 17 | 15 | 24 | | 11 | 21 | 9 | 7 | |
| Harrogate Town | | | | | | | | | | | | | | | | | 17 | 19 | 19 | 13 | 18 | 23 | |
| Hartlepool United | | | 2 | | | | | | | 19 | 22 | 16 | 23 | | | | | 17 | 23 | | | | |
| Hereford United | | | 16 | 3 | | 16 | 21 | 23 | | | | | | | | | | | | | | | |
| Kidderminster Harriers | 23 | | | | | | | | | | | | | | | | | | | | | | |
| Leyton Orient | 11 | 3 | | | | | | | | | | 8 | 24 | | | 17 | 11 | 13 | 1 | | | | |
| Lincoln City | 6 | 7 | 5 | 15 | 13 | 20 | 23 | | | | | | | 7 | 1 | | | | | | | | |
| Luton Town | | | | | 24 | | | | | | 8 | 11 | 4 | 2 | | | | | | | | | |
| Macclesfield Town | 5 | 17 | 22 | 19 | 20 | 19 | 15 | 24 | | | | | | | 22 | 24 | | | | | | | |
| Mansfield Town | 13 | 16 | 17 | 23 | | | | | | 11 | 21 | 12 | 12 | 8 | 4 | 21 | 16 | 7 | 8 | 3 | | | |
| Milton Keynes Dons | | | 4 | 1 | | | | | | | | | | | 3 | | | | | 4 | 19 | 2 | |
| Morecambe | | | | 11 | 11 | 4 | 20 | 15 | 16 | 18 | 11 | 21 | 18 | 22 | 18 | 22 | 4 | | | 15 | 24 | | |
| Newport County | | | | | | | | | | 14 | 9 | 22 | 22 | 11 | 7 | 14 | 5 | 11 | 15 | 18 | 22 | 20 | |
| Northampton Town | 7 | 2 | | | | 11 | 16 | 20 | 6 | 21 | 12 | 1 | | | 15 | 7 | | 4 | 3 | | | | |
| Notts County | 19 | 21 | 13 | 21 | 19 | 1 | | | | | | 17 | 16 | 5 | 23 | | | | | 14 | 6 | 5 | |
| Oldham Athletic | | | | | | | | | | | | | | | 14 | 19 | 18 | 23 | | | | 10 | |
| Oxford United | 15 | 23 | | | | | 12 | 9 | 9 | 8 | 13 | 2 | | | | | | | | | | | |
| Peterborough United | | 9 | 10 | 2 | | | | | | | | | | | | | | | | | | | |
| Plymouth Argyle | | | | | | | | 21 | 21 | 10 | 7 | 5 | 2 | | | 3 | | | | | | | |
| Port Vale | | | | | 18 | 10 | 11 | 12 | 3 | | | | | 20 | 20 | 8 | 13 | 5 | | | 2 | | |
| Portsmouth | | | | | | | | | | 13 | 16 | 6 | 1 | | | | | | | | | | |
| Rochdale | 9 | 14 | 9 | 5 | 6 | 3 | | | 12 | 3 | | | | | | | | 18 | 24 | | | | |
| Rotherham United | | | | 9 | 14 | 5 | 9 | 10 | 2 | | | | | | | | | | | | | | |
| Rushden & Diamonds | 22 | 24 | | | | | | | | | | | | | | | | | | | | | |
| Salford City | | | | | | | | | | | | | | | | 11 | 8 | 10 | 7 | 20 | 8 | 4 | |
| Scunthorpe United | 2 | | | | | | | | | 2 | | | | | | 20 | 22 | 24 | | | | | |
| Shrewsbury Town | 21 | 10 | 7 | 18 | 7 | 12 | 4 | 2 | | | 2 | | | | | | | | | | | 19 | |
| Southend United | 4 | | | | | | 13 | 4 | 11 | 5 | 5 | | | | | | 23 | | | | | | |
| Stevenage | | | | | | | 6 | | | | 6 | 18 | 10 | 16 | 10 | 23 | 14 | 21 | 2 | | | | |
| Stockport County | | 22 | 8 | 4 | | | 24 | | | | | | | | | | | | 4 | 1 | | | |
| Sutton United | | | | | | | | | | | | | | | | | | 8 | 14 | 23 | | | |
| Swansea City | 3 | | | | | | | | | | | | | | | | | | | | | | |
| Swindon Town | | | 3 | | | | | 1 | | | | | | 9 | 13 | 1 | | 6 | 10 | 19 | 12 | 9 | |
| Torquay United | | 20 | 24 | | | 17 | 7 | 5 | 19 | 24 | | | | | | | | | | | | | |
| Tranmere Rovers | | | | | | | | | | | 24 | | | | 6 | | 7 | 9 | 12 | 16 | 20 | 21 | |
| Walsall | | | 1 | | | | | | | | | | | | | 12 | 19 | 16 | 16 | 11 | 4 | 13 | |
| AFC Wimbledon | | | | | | | | 16 | 20 | 20 | 15 | 7 | | | | | | | 21 | 10 | 5 | | |
| Wrexham | | 13 | 19 | 24 | | | | | | | | | | | | | | | | 2 | | | |
| Wycombe Wanderers | 10 | 6 | 12 | 7 | 3 | | 3 | | 15 | 22 | 4 | 13 | 9 | 3 | | | | | | | | | |
| Yeovil Town | 1 | | | | | | | | | | | 19 | 20 | 19 | 24 | | | | | | | | |
| York City | | | | | | | | | 17 | 7 | 18 | 24 | | | | | | | | | | | |
| Club | 04 05 | 05 06 | 06 07 | 07 08 | 08 09 | 09 10 | 10 11 | 11 12 | 12 13 | 13 14 | 14 15 | 15 16 | 16 17 | 17 18 | 18 19 | 19 20 | 20 21 | 21 22 | 22 23 | 23 24 | 24 25 | 25 26 | 26 27 |
