= EFL League Two Manager of the Month =

Monthly association football award

The EFL League Two Manager of the Month is a monthly association football award to recognise the outstanding team manager in EFL League Two, the fourth tier of English football. The recipient is chosen by a panel assembled by the League's sponsor, Sky Bet, and the award is announced alongside those for the EFL Championship and EFL League One Manager of the Month at the beginning of the following month. The League Two award was introduced in February 2005 when Coca-Cola was the sponsor. Their sponsorship ended in 2010.

The highest number of awards won is five by Keith Hill, all with Rochdale. Phil Brown, John Coleman, Paul Ince and Chris Wilder have won four awards each and another ten managers have won three apiece. At club level, Bury managers have won the award eight times, followed by Northampton Town. Port Vale and Southend United (all seven).

== List of winners ==
Month	Year (Note: Each year in the table is linked to the corresponding football season.)	Nationality	Manager	Team	Ref
January	2005	Argentina	Ramón Díaz	Oxford United	
February	2005	England	Brian Horton	Macclesfield Town	
March	2005	England	Steve Tilson	Southend United	
April	2005	England	Brian Laws	Scunthorpe United	
August	2005	Iceland	Guðjón Þórðarson	Crewe Alexandra	
September	2005	Scotland	John Gorman	Wycombe Wanderers	
October	2005	England	Martin Ling	Leyton Orient	
November	2005	England	John Ward	Cheltenham Town	
December	2005	England	Paul Simpson	Carlisle United	
January	2006	Scotland	Colin Calderwood	Northampton Town	
February	2006	Saint Lucia	Keith Alexander	Lincoln City	
March	2006	England	Paul Simpson	Carlisle United	
April	2006	England	Ian Atkins	Torquay United	
August	2006	England	Dennis Wise	Swindon Town	
September	2006	Northern Ireland	Danny Wilson	Hartlepool United	
October	2006	England	John Schofield	Lincoln City	
November	2006	England	Richard Money	Walsall	
December	2006	England	Paul Ince	Macclesfield Town	
January	2007	England	Keith Hill	Rochdale	
February	2007	Northern Ireland	Danny Wilson	Hartlepool United	
March	2007	Northern Ireland	Danny Wilson	Hartlepool United	
April	2007	Wales	Paul Trollope	Bristol Rovers	
August	2007	Northern Ireland	Sammy McIlroy	Morecambe	
September	2007	England	Paul Fairclough	Barnet	
October	2007	England	Paul Ince	Milton Keynes Dons	
November	2007	England	Mark Robins	Rotherham United	
December	2007	England	Paul Ince	Milton Keynes Dons	
January	2008	England	Keith Hill	Rochdale	
February	2008	England	Peter Jackson	Lincoln City	
March	2008	Scotland	Darren Ferguson	Peterborough United	
April	2008	England	Paul Ince	Milton Keynes Dons	
August	2008	England	Mark Robins	Rotherham United	
September	2008	Wales	Alan Knill	Bury	
October	2008	England	Peter Jackson	Lincoln City	
November	2008	England	Peter Taylor	Wycombe Wanderers	
December	2008	England	John Still	Dagenham & Redbridge	
January	2009	Wales	Alan Knill	Bury	
February	2009	Northern Ireland	Sammy McIlroy	Morecambe	
March	2009	England	Lee Richardson	Chesterfield	
April	2009	England	Andy Scott	Brentford	
August	2009	England	John Still	Dagenham & Redbridge	
September	2009	England	Keith Hill	Rochdale	
October	2009	Ireland	John Sheridan	Chesterfield	
November	2009	England	Ronnie Moore	Rotherham United	
December	2009	England	Keith Hill	Rochdale	
January	2010	England	Ian Sampson	Northampton Town	
February	2010	Ireland	John Sheridan	Chesterfield	
March	2010	England	Steve Cotterill	Notts County	
April	2010	England	Steve Cotterill	Notts County	
August	2010	England	Paul Buckle	Torquay United	
September	2010	England	Micky Adams	Port Vale	
October	2010	England	Alan Knill	Bury	
November	2010	England	Micky Adams	Port Vale	
December	2010	England	Andy Hessenthaler	Gillingham	
January	2011	England	Dario Gradi	Crewe Alexandra	
February	2011	England	Graham Turner	Shrewsbury Town	
March	2011	England	Dean Holdsworth	Aldershot Town	
April	2011	England	Richie Barker	Bury	
August	2011	England	Andy Scott	Rotherham United	
September	2011	Scotland	Paul Sturrock	Southend United	
October	2011	Scotland	Steve Evans	Crawley Town	
November	2011	England	Mark Yates	Cheltenham Town	
December	2011	England	Phil Parkinson	Bradford City	
January	2012	England	Martin Ling	Torquay United	
February	2012	Italy	Paolo Di Canio	Swindon Town	
March	2012	England	Martin Ling	Torquay United	
April	2012	England	Graham Turner	Shrewsbury Town	
August	2012	England	Martin Allen	Gillingham	
September	2012	England	Micky Adams	Port Vale	
October	2012	England	Mark Yates	Cheltenham Town	
November	2012	Scotland	Paul Sturrock	Southend United	
December	2012	England	Gary Rowett	Burton Albion	
January	2013	England	Martin Allen	Gillingham	
February	2013	England	Gary Rowett	Burton Albion	
March	2013	Ireland	John Sheridan	Plymouth Argyle	
April	2013	Northern Ireland	Nigel Worthington	York City	
August	2013	England	Paul Cook	Chesterfield	
September	2013	England	Keith Hill	Rochdale	
October	2013	England	Colin Cooper	Hartlepool United	
November	2013	England	Phil Brown	Southend United	
December	2013	England	Mark Yates	Cheltenham Town	
January	2014	Scotland	Graham Alexander	Fleetwood Town	
February	2014	England	David Flitcroft	Bury	
March	2014	Northern Ireland	Nigel Worthington	York City	
April	2014	England	Andy Awford	Portsmouth	
August	2014	England	Jim Bentley	Morecambe	
September	2014	England	Phil Brown	Southend United	
October	2014	England	John Still	Luton Town	
November	2014	England	Phil Brown	Southend United	
December	2014	England	Neal Ardley	AFC Wimbledon	
January	2015	England	Chris Wilder	Northampton Town	
February	2015	England	Andy Awford	Portsmouth	
March	2015	England	Gareth Ainsworth	Wycombe Wanderers	
April	2015	England	Phil Brown	Southend United	
August	2015	England	Ian Hendon	Leyton Orient	
September	2015	England	John Coleman	Accrington Stanley	
October	2015	Scotland	Derek Adams	Plymouth Argyle	
November	2015	England	Chris Wilder	Northampton Town	
December	2015	England	Shaun Derry	Cambridge United	
January	2016	England	Chris Wilder	Northampton Town	
February	2016	England	Chris Wilder	Northampton Town	
March	2016	England	Darrell Clarke	Bristol Rovers	
April	2016	England	Neal Ardley	AFC Wimbledon	
August	2016	England	Jim Bentley	Morecambe	
September	2016	Scotland	Derek Adams	Plymouth Argyle	
October	2016	England	Keith Curle	Carlisle United	
November	2016	England	Gareth Ainsworth	Wycombe Wanderers	
December	2016	England	John McGreal	Colchester United	
January	2017	Scotland	Darren Ferguson	Doncaster Rovers	
February	2017	England	Darren Sarll	Stevenage	
March	2017	England	John Coleman	Accrington Stanley	
April	2017	England	Paul Cook	Portsmouth	
August	2017	England	Paul Tisdale	Exeter City	
September	2017	England	Kevin Nolan	Notts County	
October	2017	Wales	Nathan Jones	Luton Town	
November	2017	Wales	Nathan Jones	Luton Town	
December	2017	England	Danny Cowley	Lincoln City	
January	2018	England	Gareth Ainsworth	Wycombe Wanderers	
February	2018	England	John Coleman	Accrington Stanley	
March	2018	England	John Coleman	Accrington Stanley	
April	2018	Wales	Nathan Jones	Luton Town	
August	2018	England	Danny Cowley	Lincoln City	
September	2018	Wales	Michael Flynn	Newport County	
October	2018	England	Paul Tisdale	Milton Keynes Dons	
November	2018	England	Ryan Lowe	Bury	
December	2018	England	Michael Jolley	Grimsby Town	
January	2019	England	Ryan Lowe	Bury	
February	2019	England	Ryan Lowe	Bury	
March	2019	Scotland	Micky Mellon	Tranmere Rovers	
April	2019	Wales	Michael Flynn	Newport County	
August	2019	England	Matt Taylor	Exeter City	
September	2019	Northern Ireland	Michael Duff	Cheltenham Town	
October	2019	Scotland	Graham Alexander	Salford City	
November	2019	England	Richie Wellens	Swindon Town	
December	2019	England	Matt Taylor	Exeter City	
January	2020	England	Ryan Lowe	Plymouth Argyle	
February	2020	Northern Ireland	Michael Duff	Cheltenham Town	
September	2020	England	Mark Bonner	Cambridge United	
October	2020	Wales	Michael Flynn	Newport County	
November	2020	England	Ian Evatt	Bolton Wanderers	
December	2020	Scotland	Derek Adams	Morecambe	
January	2021	England	Mark Bonner	Cambridge United	
February	2021	England	Ian Evatt	Bolton Wanderers	
March	2021	England	Ian Evatt	Bolton Wanderers	
April	2021	England	Gary Bowyer	Salford City	
August	2021	Wales	Rob Edwards	Forest Green Rovers	
September	2021	England	Darrell Clarke	Port Vale	
October	2021	England	Darrell Clarke	Port Vale	
November	2021	Wales	Rob Edwards	Forest Green Rovers	
December	2021	Scotland	Micky Mellon	Tranmere Rovers	
January	2022	Wales	Rob Edwards	Forest Green Rovers	
February	2022	England	Matt Taylor	Exeter City	
March	2022	England	Joey Barton	Bristol Rovers	
April	2022	England	Matt Taylor	Exeter City	
August	2022	England	Richie Wellens	Leyton Orient	
September	2022	England	Richie Wellens	Leyton Orient	
October	2022	Wales	Michael Flynn	Walsall	
November	2022	England	Johnnie Jackson	AFC Wimbledon	
December	2022	England	Dave Challinor	Stockport County	
January	2023	England	Matt Bloomfield	Colchester United	
February	2023	England	Dave Challinor	Stockport County	
March	2023	Australia	Jon Brady	Northampton Town	
April	2023	Scotland	Steve Evans	Stevenage	
August	2023	Scotland	Graham Alexander	Milton Keynes Dons	
September	2023	England	Dave Challinor	Stockport County	
October	2023	England	Dave Challinor	Stockport County	
November	2023	England	Pete Wild	Barrow	
December	2023	England	Mike Williamson	Milton Keynes Dons	
January	2024	England	Simon Weaver	Harrogate Town	
February	2024	England	Nigel Clough	Mansfield Town	
March	2024	England	Pete Wild	Barrow	
April	2024	Northern Ireland	Grant McCann	Doncaster Rovers	
August	2024	England	Mark Bonner	Gillingham	
September	2024	Jamaica	Darren Moore	Port Vale	
October	2024	Jamaica	Darren Moore	Port Vale	
November	2024	Scotland	Derek Adams	Morecambe	
December	2024	England	Mat Sadler	Walsall	
January	2025	England	Ian Holloway	Swindon Town	
February	2025	Scotland	Graham Alexander	Bradford City	
March	2025	England	Danny Cowley	Colchester United	
April	2025	Northern Ireland	Grant McCann	Doncaster Rovers	
August	2025	England	Gareth Ainsworth	Gillingham	
September	2025	England	Mat Sadler	Walsall	
October	2025	England	Steve Cotterill	Cheltenham Town	
November	2025	England	Danny Cowley	Colchester United	
December	2025	England	Andy Woodman	Bromley	
January	2026	England	Neil Harris	Cambridge United	
February	2026	England	Gavin Cowan	Shrewsbury Town	
March	2026	Scotland	Micky Mellon	Oldham Athletic	
April	2026	Scotland	Steve Evans	Bristol Rovers	
August	2026	Ireland	Dean Brennan	Barnet	
September	2026	Australia	Peter Cklamovski	Salford City	
October	2026	Australia	Peter Cklamovski	Salford City	

== Multiple winners ==
Up to and including the April 2026 award.

- The below table lists all the people that have won on more than two occasions.

Rank	Manager	Wins
1st	(England) Keith Hill	5
2nd	(Scotland) Derek Adams	4
2nd	(England) Gareth Ainsworth	4
2nd	(Scotland) Graham Alexander	4
2nd	(England) Phil Brown	4
2nd	(England) Dave Challinor	4
2nd	(England) John Coleman	4
2nd	(England) Danny Cowley	4
2nd	(Wales) Michael Flynn	4
2nd	(England) Paul Ince	4
2nd	(England) Ryan Lowe	4
2nd	(England) Matt Taylor	4
2nd	(England) Chris Wilder	4
13th	(England) Micky Adams	3
13th	(England) Mark Bonner	3
13th	(England) Darrell Clarke	3
13th	(England) Steve Cotterill	3
13th	(Wales) Rob Edwards	3
13th	(Scotland) Steve Evans	3
13th	(England) Ian Evatt	3
13th	(Wales) Nathan Jones	3
13th	(Wales) Alan Knill	3
13th	(England) Martin Ling	3
13th	(Scotland) Micky Mellon	3
13th	(Republic of Ireland) John Sheridan	3
13th	(England) John Still	3
13th	(England) Richie Wellens	3
13th	(Northern Ireland) Danny Wilson	3
13th	(England) Mark Yates	3

== Awards won by nationality ==
Up to and including the October 2026 award.

Country	Wins
England	138
Scotland	20
Wales	13
Northern Ireland	10
Ireland	4
Australia	3
Jamaica	2
Argentina	1
Iceland	1
Italy	1
Saint Lucia	1

== Awards won by club ==
Up to and including the October 2026 award.

Club	Wins
Bury	8
Cheltenham Town	7
Northampton Town	7
Port Vale	7
Southend United	7
Lincoln City	6
Milton Keynes Dons	6
Morecambe	6
Exeter City	5
Gillingham	5
Rochdale	5
Wycombe Wanderers	5
Accrington Stanley	4
Bristol Rovers	4
Cambridge United	4
Chesterfield	4
Colchester United	4
Hartlepool United	4
Leyton Orient	4
Luton Town	4
Plymouth Argyle	4
Rotherham United	4
Salford City	4
Stockport County	4
Swindon Town	4
Torquay United	4
Walsall	4
AFC Wimbledon	3
Bolton Wanderers	3
Carlisle United	3
Doncaster Rovers	3
Forest Green Rovers	3
Newport County	3
Notts County	3
Portsmouth	3
Barnet	2
Barrow	2
Bradford City	2
Burton Albion	2
Crewe Alexandra	2
Dagenham & Redbridge	2
Macclesfield Town	2
Shrewsbury Town	2
Stevenage	2
Tranmere Rovers	2
York City	2
Aldershot Town	1
Brentford	1
Bromley	1
Crawley Town	1
Fleetwood Town	1
Grimsby Town	1
Harrogate Town	1
Mansfield Town	1
Oldham Athletic	1
Oxford United	1
Peterborough United	1
Scunthorpe United	1
Shrewsbury Town	1
