= Mark Bonner (football manager) =

English football manager

Personal information
- Date of birth: 23 November 1985 (age 40)
- Place of birth: Cambridge, England

Team information
- Current team: Cambridge United (director of football)

Managerial career
- Years: Team
- 2011–2014: Cambridge Regional College
- 2020–2023: Cambridge United
- 2024–2025: Gillingham

Mark Bonner (born 23 November 1985) is an English football manager who is currently director of football of Cambridge United.

== Coaching career ==
Bonner first joined Cambridge United in 2002, working at Cambridge's centre of excellence, before the club entered administration, causing Cambridge to close their academy. In 2005, Bonner joined Southend United as a coach in the academy.

Bonner returned to Cambridge United in June 2011, working in a number of positions in the club's academy, including being manager of Cambridge's reserve and feeder club Cambridge Regional College. In January 2018, Bonner was named as first team coach, working under manager Shaun Derry and assistant Joe Dunne, taking over the role from Mick Halsall.

Following the departure of Derry in February 2018, Dunne took over as interim head coach with Bonner serving as his assistant head coach. Dunne and Bonner's roles were made permanent in May of that year following a successful interim spell. As results declined in the first half of the 2018–19 season, Dunne departed the club in December 2018 with Bonner taking over temporary charge of the first team, overseeing a defeat and a draw before Colin Calderwood was appointed later that month, with Bonner returning to his role as assistant head coach.

Calderwood's departure in January 2020 again saw Bonner take temporary charge of first team duties, overseeing four wins in his first four matches in charge.

=== Cambridge United manager ===
In March 2020, Bonner was named permanent head coach of Cambridge United on a two-year contract until the end of the 2021–22 season.

Due to the curtailing of the 2019–20 season caused by the COVID-19 pandemic, Bonner's first match as permanent head coach did not come for six months until Cambridge United knocked Championship side Birmingham City out of the first round of the 2020–21 EFL Cup.

Bonner's first full season as a manager was hugely successful for Cambridge United, both in team and personal honours. In September, he was named League Two Manager of the Month after an unbeaten start saw Cambridge United top of the league with seven points and without conceding a goal. He won his second monthly award in January after an unbeaten month of three wins and two draws saw the U's return to the top of the table. Cambridge United continued their encouraging form into the final stretch of the season and, after spurning two chances to secure promotion with surprise losses to Stevenage and Harrogate Town, a 3–0 win at home to Grimsby Town saw them confirm a second-placed finish, and promotion to League One for the first time since 2002.

On 10 May 2021, Bonner signed a new three-year contract with the club. Bonner led Cambridge to a 1–0 away win to Premier League Newcastle United in the FA Cup third round in January 2022. On 14 September 2023, Bonner signed a new "long term" contract with the club, but two months later he was sacked with the club sitting in 18th position, four points above the relegation zone. A 3–0 defeat to Lincoln City was the club's third defeat in a row, and they had picked up just one win in the previous thirteen league matches at the time of his departure.

=== Gillingham manager ===
In May 2024, Bonner was appointed manager of Gillingham. An unbeaten start to the season saw Bonner named the League Two Manager of the Month for August 2024. Bonner was dismissed from his role on 5 January 2025.

=== Return to Cambridge United ===
On 19 February 2025, Bonner returned to Cambridge United as director of football.

== Managerial statistics ==
As of match played 2 January 2025

Managerial record by team and tenure
Team	From	To	Record					Ref
Team	From	To	P	W	D	L	Win %	Ref
Cambridge United^{[a]}	29 January 2020	29 November 2023	201	77	43	81	38.31	
Gillingham	7 May 2024	5 January 2025	28	9	4	15	32.14	
Total			229	86	47	96	37.55	

a. Initially caretaker and appointed permanently on 9 March 2020

== Honours ==
=== Manager ===
Cambridge United

- EFL League Two runner-up: 2020–21

Individual

- League Two Manager of the Month: September 2020, January 2021, August 2024
