= List of winners of the EFL League Two and predecessors =

English League (4th tier)

Football League Fourth Division (1958–1992) Football League Third Division (1992–2004) Football League Two (2004–2016) EFL League Two (2016–present)
- Country
- England
- Founded
- 1958
- Number of teams
- 24 (2025–26 season)
- Current champions
- Bromley (2025–26)
- Most successful club
- Chesterfield and Doncaster Rovers (4 championships each)

A national fourth tier of English league football was established in 1958–59, as the Fourth Division. It was formed from the merger of the Third Division North and the Third Division South. In 1992, with the departure of the First Division clubs to become the Premier League, the fourth tier became known as the Third Division. Since 2004 it has been known as League Two.

== Football League Fourth Division (1958–1992) ==
Season	Champions	Runners-up	Also promoted	Play-off winners
1958–59	Port Vale	Coventry City	York City, Shrewsbury Town	No play-offs
1959–60	Walsall	Notts County	Torquay United, Watford	No play-offs
1960–61	Peterborough United	Crystal Palace	Northampton Town, Bradford	No play-offs
1961–62	Millwall	Colchester United	Wrexham, Carlisle United	No play-offs
1962–63	Brentford	Oldham Athletic	Crewe Alexandra, Mansfield Town	No play-offs
1963–64	Gillingham	Carlisle United	Workington, Exeter City	No play-offs
1964–65	Brighton & Hove Albion	Millwall	York City, Oxford United	No play-offs
1965–66	Doncaster Rovers	Darlington	Torquay United, Colchester United	No play-offs
1966–67	Stockport County	Southport	Barrow, Tranmere Rovers	No play-offs
1967–68	Luton Town	Barnsley	Hartlepools United, Crewe Alexandra	No play-offs
1968–69	Doncaster Rovers (2)	Halifax Town	Rochdale, Bradford City	No play-offs
1969–70	Chesterfield	Wrexham	Swansea City, Port Vale	No play-offs
1970–71	Notts County	Bournemouth & Boscombe Athletic	Oldham Athletic, York City	No play-offs
1971–72	Grimsby Town	Southend United	Brentford, Scunthorpe United	No play-offs
1972–73	Southport	Hereford United	Cambridge United, Aldershot	No play-offs
1973–74	Peterborough United (2)	Gillingham	Colchester United, Bury	No play-offs
1974–75	Mansfield Town	Shrewsbury Town	Rotherham United, Chester City	No play-offs
1975–76	Lincoln City	Northampton Town	Reading, Tranmere Rovers	No play-offs
1976–77	Cambridge United	Exeter City	Colchester United, Bradford City	No play-offs
1977–78	Watford	Southend United	Swansea City, Brentford	No play-offs
1978–79	Reading	Grimsby Town	Wimbledon, Barnsley	No play-offs
1979–80	Huddersfield Town	Walsall	Newport County, Portsmouth	No play-offs
1980–81	Southend United	Lincoln City	Doncaster Rovers, Wimbledon	No play-offs
1981–82	Sheffield United	Bradford City	Wigan Athletic, AFC Bournemouth	No play-offs
1982–83	Wimbledon	Hull City	Port Vale, Scunthorpe United	No play-offs
1983–84	York City	Doncaster Rovers	Reading, Bristol City	No play-offs
1984–85	Chesterfield (2)	Blackpool	Darlington, Bury	No play-offs
1985–86	Swindon Town	Chester City	Mansfield Town, Port Vale	No play-offs
1986–87	Northampton Town	Preston North End	Southend United	Aldershot
1987–88	Wolverhampton Wanderers	Cardiff City	Bolton Wanderers	Swansea City
1988–89	Rotherham United	Tranmere Rovers	Crewe Alexandra	Leyton Orient
1989–90	Exeter City	Grimsby Town	Southend United	Cambridge United
1990–91	Darlington	Stockport County	Hartlepool United, Peterborough United	Torquay United
1991–92	Burnley	Rotherham United	Mansfield Town	Blackpool

== Football League Third Division (1992–2004) ==
Season	Champions	Runners-up	Also promoted	Play-off winners
1992–93	Cardiff City	Wrexham	Barnet	York City
1993–94	Shrewsbury Town	Chester City	Crewe Alexandra	Wycombe Wanderers
1994–95	Carlisle United	Walsall	—	Chesterfield
1995–96	Preston North End	Gillingham	Bury	Plymouth Argyle
1996–97	Wigan Athletic	Fulham	Carlisle United	Northampton Town
1997–98	Notts County (2)	Macclesfield Town	Lincoln City	Colchester United
1998–99	Brentford (2)	Cambridge United	Cardiff City	Scunthorpe United
1999–2000	Swansea City	Rotherham United	Northampton Town	Peterborough United
2000–01	Brighton & Hove Albion (2)	Cardiff City	Chesterfield	Blackpool
2001–02	Plymouth Argyle	Luton Town	Mansfield Town	Cheltenham Town
2002–03	Rushden & Diamonds	Hartlepool United	Wrexham	AFC Bournemouth
2003–04	Doncaster Rovers (3)	Hull City	Torquay United	Huddersfield Town

== Football League Two/EFL League Two (2004 onwards) ==
Season	Champions	Runners-up	Third place	Play-off winners
2004–05	Yeovil Town	Scunthorpe United	Swansea City	Southend United
2005–06	Carlisle United (2)	Northampton Town	Leyton Orient	Cheltenham Town
2006–07	Walsall (2)	Hartlepool United	Swindon Town	Bristol Rovers
2007–08	Milton Keynes Dons	Peterborough United	Hereford United	Stockport County
2008–09	Brentford (3)	Exeter City	Wycombe Wanderers	Gillingham
2009–10	Notts County (3)	Bournemouth	Rochdale	Dagenham & Redbridge
2010–11	Chesterfield (3)	Bury	Wycombe Wanderers	Stevenage
2011–12	Swindon Town (2)	Shrewsbury Town	Crawley Town	Crewe Alexandra
2012–13	Gillingham (2)	Rotherham United	Port Vale	Bradford City
2013–14	Chesterfield (4)	Scunthorpe United	Rochdale	Fleetwood Town
2014–15	Burton Albion	Shrewsbury Town	Bury	Southend United
2015–16	Northampton Town (2)	Oxford United	Bristol Rovers	AFC Wimbledon
2016–17	Portsmouth	Plymouth Argyle	Doncaster Rovers	Blackpool
2017–18	Accrington Stanley	Luton Town	Wycombe Wanderers	Coventry City
2018–19	Lincoln City (2)	Bury	Milton Keynes Dons	Tranmere Rovers
2019–20	Swindon Town (3)	Crewe Alexandra	Plymouth Argyle	Northampton Town
2020–21	Cheltenham Town	Cambridge United	Bolton Wanderers	Morecambe
2021–22	Forest Green Rovers	Exeter City	Bristol Rovers	Port Vale
2022–23	Leyton Orient	Stevenage	Northampton Town	Carlisle United
2023–24	Stockport County (2)	Wrexham	Mansfield Town	Crawley Town
2024–25	Doncaster Rovers (4)	Port Vale	Bradford City	AFC Wimbledon
2025–26	Bromley	Milton Keynes Dons	Cambridge United	Notts County

== Number of titles overall ==
Clubs in bold are competing in the 2025–26 EFL League Two.

Rank	Club	Winners	Winning seasons
1	**Chesterfield**	4	1969–70, 1984–85, 2010–11, 2013–14
1	Doncaster Rovers	4	1965–66, 1968–69, 2003–04, 2024–25
2	Brentford	3	1962–63, 1998–99, 2008–09
2	**Notts County**	3	1970–71, 1997–98, 2009–10
2	**Swindon Town**	3	1985–86, 2011–12, 2019–20
6	Brighton & Hove Albion	2	1964–65, 2000–01
6	Carlisle United	2	1994–95, 2005–06
6	**Gillingham**	2	1963–64, 2012–13
6	Lincoln City	2	1975–76, 2018–19
6	Northampton Town	2	1986–87, 2015–16
6	Peterborough United	2	1960–61, 1973–74
6	Stockport County	2	1966–67, 2023–24
6	**Walsall**	2	1959–60, 2006–07
14	**Accrington Stanley**	1	2017–18
14	**Bromley**	1	2025–26
14	Burnley	1	1991–92
14	Burton Albion	1	2014–15
14	**Cambridge United**	1	1976–77
14	Cardiff City	1	1992–93
14	**Cheltenham Town**	1	2020–21
14	Darlington	1	1990–91
14	Exeter City	1	1989–90
14	Forest Green Rovers	1	2021–22
14	**Grimsby Town**	1	1971–72
14	Huddersfield Town	1	1979–80
14	Leyton Orient	1	2022–23
14	Luton Town	1	1967–68
14	Mansfield Town	1	1974–75
14	Millwall	1	1961–62
14	**Milton Keynes Dons**	1	2007–08
14	Plymouth Argyle	1	2001–02
14	Port Vale	1	1958–59
14	Portsmouth	1	2016–17
14	Preston North End	1	1995–96
14	Reading	1	1978–79
14	Rotherham United	1	1988–89
14	Rushden & Diamonds	1	2002–03
14	Sheffield United	1	1981–82
14	Shrewsbury Town	1	1993–94
14	Southend United	1	1980–81
14	Southport	1	1972–73
14	Swansea City	1	1999–2000
14	Watford	1	1977–78
14	Wigan Athletic	1	1996–97
14	Wimbledon	1	1982–83
14	Wolverhampton Wanderers	1	1987–88
14	Yeovil Town	1	2004–05
14	York City	1	1983–84
