= Peter Cklamovski =

Australian soccer player and manager

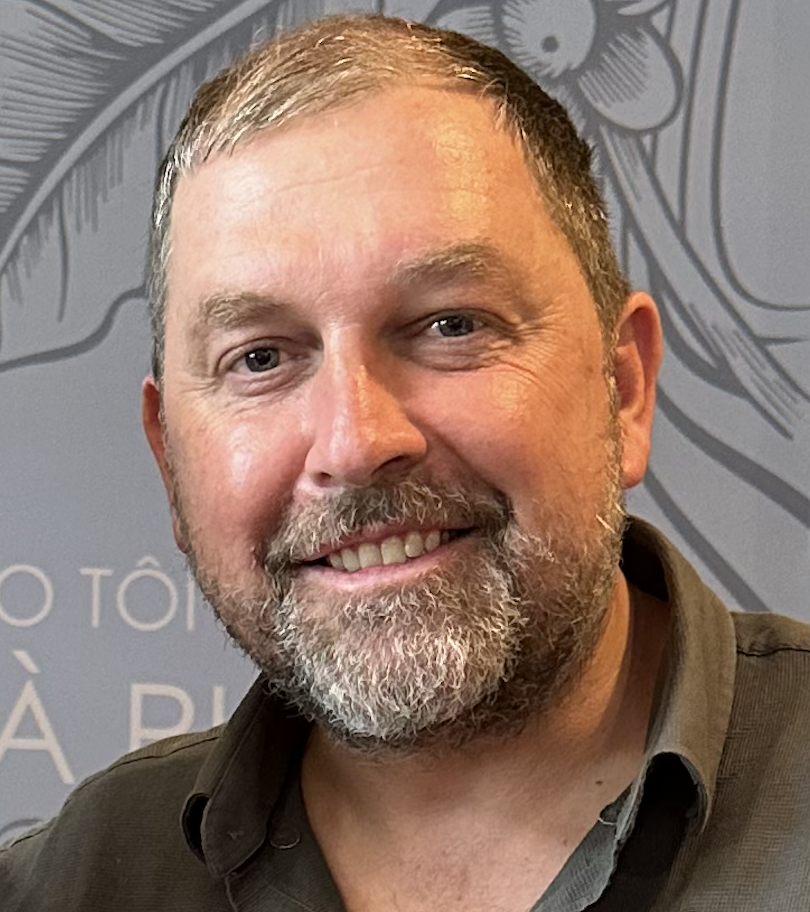

Personal information
- Date of birth: 16 October 1978 (age 48)
- Place of birth: Sydney, Australia
- Position: Midfielder

Team information
- Current team: Salford City (manager)

Youth career
- 1999: NSWIS

Senior career*
Years	Team	Apps	(Gls)
2001	Rockdale City Suns		
2001–2002	Bonnyrigg White Eagles	4	(1)
2002	Hajduk Wanderers	3	(0)

Managerial career
- 2017: Australia U17
- 2020: Shimizu S-Pulse
- 2021–2023: Montedio Yamagata
- 2023–2024: FC Tokyo
- 2025–2026: Malaysia
- 2026–: Salford City
Medal record
Men's soccer
Representing Australia (as Assistant Coach)
AFC Asian Cup
Winner	2015 Australia
- * Club domestic league appearances and goals

Peter Cklamovski (Macedonian: Петар Чкламовски; born 16 October 1978) is an Australian professional football manager and former player who is the manager of EFL League Two club Salford City.

Cklamovski began his coaching career in 2004 with Australia’s national youth teams, working under Ange Postecoglou at FIFA World Youth Championships and AFC Youth Championships, before moving abroad to Greece’s Panaxaiki and later joining Melbourne Victory in Australia’s premier competition, the A-League.

In 2014, Cklamovski joined Postecoglou’s staff with the Australian national team, serving as assistant coach through one of the nation’s most successful periods ever. As part of the wider coaching team, they led the Socceroos at the 2014 FIFA World Cup, guided the team to success at the 2015 AFC Asian Cup becoming champions and securing what was Australia’s first ever continental title, secured their place at the 2017 FIFA Confederations Cup and earned qualification for the FIFA World Cup Russia 2018. Cklamovski also managed the Australia under-17 team in 2017, guiding them through 2018 AFC U-16 Championship qualification.

He later joined Postecoglou at Yokohama F. Marinos in Japan as assistant coach in 2018, helping the team secure the 2019 J1 League title, their first since 2004. In 2020, Cklamovski became head coach of Shimizu S-Pulse in the J1 League. He then managed Montedio Yamagata in the J2 League, where he is credited with transforming the team's style into an attacking, win-focused approach. His tenure saw the club achieve its best win percentage and points-per-game record in history while avoiding relegation and nearing promotion in 2022. Cklamovski was then signed by J1 League outfit FC Tokyo in 2023.

Cklamovski brought to an end a successful seven year spell in Japanese club football at the end of the 2024 J1 League season, taking up the position of Malaysia national team head coach in January 2025.

== Early life and education ==
Cklamovski played in Australia in the New South Wales Super League with Bonnyrigg White Eagles and Rockdale Ilinden. As a youth player Cklamovski was a Rockdale Ilinden junior and played in NSL youth league competitions with Sydney United and NSW ITC. Cklamovski was set for selection for the U17 Australian national youth team until a serious car accident caused injuries that rendered this impossible.

Cklamovski's first coaching job was at The Kings School Grammar, Sydney where he coached U14s and U16s in 2002 & 2003. He also worked at Westfields Sports High School as Head of Performance from 2002 to 2008. During this time, Cklamovski completed postgraduate degrees in Applied Science, Sports Coaching and Graduate Certificate in Exercise Science. During Cklamovski's coaching career he completed his Pro License in 2016.

== Managerial career ==
=== Australia national team ===
The 2014 FIFA World Cup in Brazil saw Australia's group draw with three teams - Chile, Netherlands and Spain. Australia's backroom staff included mew head coach Ange Postecoglou and his coaching team including assistant coach, Peter Cklamovski.

New hope and excitement was created in the way the team played, showcasing a new generation of stars joining established greats. Following the 2014 FIFA World Cup, training camps in September, October and November were used to develop the team for 2015 AFC Asian Cup success.

The 2015 AFC Asian Cup held in Australia resulted in the first major trophy for the Australia men's national soccer team, winning the final against South Korea 2–1 with an extra-time goal scored by James Troisi in front of 76,385 fans at Stadium Australia in Sydney.

As reigning Asian Champions, the Socceroos competed at the 2017 FIFA Confederations Cup in Russia where they would play 2014 World Champions Germany, Cameroon and Chile in the group stage.

The following year, qualification was achieved for the FIFA 2018 World Cup with the Socceroos clinching their place in the finals after defeating Honduras 3–1, in the AFA/CONCACAF Playoff at Stadium Australia (Sydney) on 15 November 2017, where captain Mile Jedinak scored a hat-trick.

=== Australia U17 ===
While working with the Socceroos, on 5 August 2017 Cklamovski was appointed by the FFA becoming Australian U-17 national youth team head coach. Cklamovski selected a squad for the AFC qualification stage. The Joeys qualified through the first stage of AFC qualification undefeated in Mongolia.

=== Yokohama F. Marinos ===
In February 2018, Cklamovski was then approached by Ange Postecoglou to join him as his Assistant at J1 League club Yokohama F. Marinos.

In 2019, Yokohama F Marinos won the J1 League for the first time in 15 years.

=== Shimizu S-Pulse ===
Following success at Yokohama F Marinos winning the 2019 J1 title, J1 outfit Shimizu S-Pulse appointed Cklamovski as head coach in February 2020.

In the disrupted 2020 season affected by the COVID-19 pandemic, Cklamovski led Shimizu S-Pulse through a compressed J.League schedule of 33 matches over a 20-week period.

Cklamovski resigned from his role as head coach on 1 November 2020.

=== Montedio Yamagata ===
On 30 April 2021, Cklamovski signed with J2 League club Montedio Yamagata and in doing so, became the first foreign head coach in the club's history.

Arriving in round 14 – where the club was sitting in the relegation zone – Cklamovksi oversaw a club record seven consecutive wins, a 12-match unbeaten run, and averaged 2.66 points per game which was another club record.

Across two seasons (2021 and 2022), Yamagata reached the J2 promotion play-offs.

In 2023, his contract was terminated in round seven with six points on the league table, five points away from sixth position. Cklamovski departed the club with the highest win percentage and points-per-game of any manager in the club’s history.

=== FC Tokyo ===
On 16 June 2023, Cklamovski was appointed as FC Tokyo head coach.

Across the 2024 season, Cklamovski fielded the youngest starting XI in the club’s history with an average age of 22.7 years, handed 12 debuts where nine were U-21, and promoted eight academy players. Attendance surged to 60,988 (a club record) and an average home crowd of 34,000 which was second highest in the J.League.

On 19 November 2024, Cklamovski announced that he would be stepping down from his role as head coach of FC Tokyo at the end of the 2024 J.League season.

=== Malaysia ===
On 16 December 2024, the Football Association of Malaysia announced the appointment of Cklamovski as the new Head Coach of the Malaysia national team. Cklamovski began his duties on 5 January 2025, with the task of leading the team to qualify for the 2027 AFC Asian Cup.

On 17 December 2025, FIFA voided the results of three friendlies matches due to the fielding of ineligible naturalized players.

On 17 March 2026, the AFC also overturned the results of two matches in the third round qualification of 2027 Asian Cup against Nepal and Vietnam into 0–3 defeats, which resulted in Malaysia not qualifying for the 2027 AFC Asian Cup.

On 18 June 2026, FAM announced that Cklamovski and his assistants had departed from the national team by mutual consent.

=== Salford City ===
On 18 June 2026, Cklamovski was appointed as the new manager of EFL League Two club Salford City. Having started with three consecutive league defeats, he was consecutively named EFL League Two Manager of the Month for September and October.

== Managerial statistics ==
As of 21 November 2026

Managerial record by team and tenure
Team	Nat.	From	To	Record					Ref.
Team	Nat.	From	To	G	W	D	L	Win %	Ref.
Shimizu S-Pulse	(Japan)	1 February 2020	31 October 2020	28	3	5	20	10.71	
Montedio Yamagata	(Japan)	30 April 2021	2 April 2023	82	37	17	28	45.12	
FC Tokyo	(Japan)	20 June 2023	31 December 2024	65	25	14	26	38.46	
Malaysia	(Malaysia)	1 January 2025	18 June 2026	9	3	0	6	33.33 (Note: Five of the losses were given due to forfeits awarded by FIFA and the AFC due to the Malaysian football naturalisation scandal)	
Salford City	(England)	18 June 2026	present	20	10	5	5	50.00	
Career Total				204	78	41	85	38.24	

== Honours ==
=== As Manager ===
==== Australia ====
- AFC Asian Cup: 2015 AFC Asian Cup (Assistant)

==== Yokohama F. Marinos ====
- J1 League: 2019 J1 League (Assistant)

=== Individual ===
- J2 League Manager of the Month: 2021 J2 League
- EFL League Two Manager of the Month: September 2026, October 2026
