= Matt Taylor (footballer, born 1982) =

English footballer and manager (born 1982)

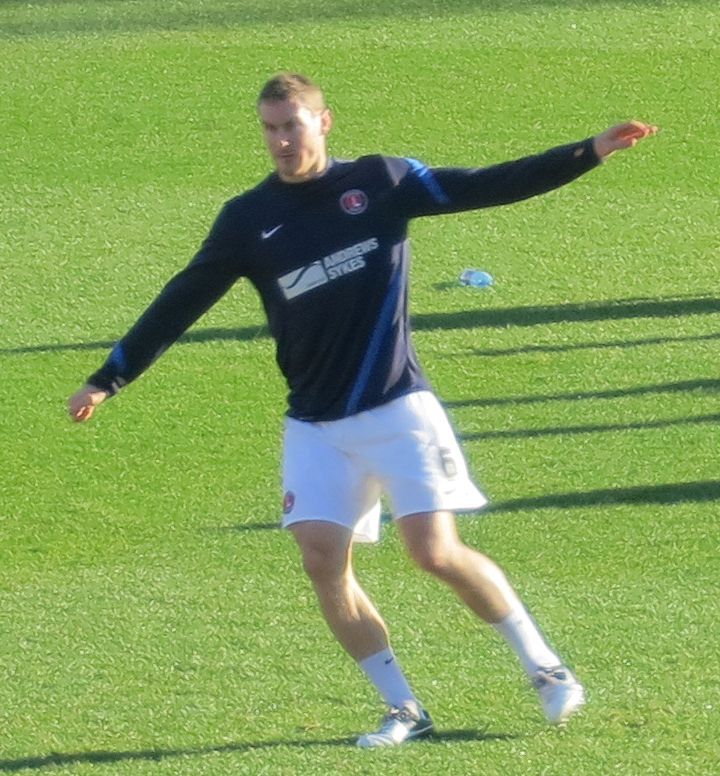
- Taylor warming up for Charlton Athletic in 2013

Personal information
- Full name: Matthew James Taylor
- Date of birth: 30 January 1982 (age 44)
- Place of birth: Chorley, England
- Position: Centre back

Team information
- Current team: Exeter City (manager)

Youth career
- 1999–2000: Everton

Senior career*
Years	Team	Apps	(Gls)
2000–2003	Burscough		
2003	Rossendale United		
2003–2004	Matlock Town		
2004–2005	Hucknall Town		
2005	Halifax Town	0	(0)
2005–2006	Guiseley		
2006–2007	Team Bath		
2007–2011	Exeter City	147	(17)
2011–2013	Charlton Athletic	53	(0)
2013–2014	Bradford City	2	(0)
2013	→ Colchester United (loan)	5	(1)
2014–2015	Cheltenham Town	33	(1)
2015–2016	Newport County	4	(0)
2016	Bath City	1	(0)
Total		245	(19)

Managerial career
- 2018–2022: Exeter City
- 2022–2023: Rotherham United
- 2023–2024: Bristol Rovers
- 2026–: Exeter City
- * Club domestic league appearances and goals

Matthew James Taylor (born 30 January 1982) is an English professional football manager and former player who played as a centre back. He is currently the manager of EFL League Two club Exeter City.

== Playing career ==
=== Early career ===
Taylor began his career as a goalkeeper playing for Preston North End Boys before being a member of the Everton U17 Academy. He joined Burscough and, alongside brother Joe, played in their 2003 FA Trophy final win 2–1 over Tamworth. The game was played at Aston Villa's Villa Park in front of more than 14,000 spectators and was televised live on Sky; the club had started their FA Trophy campaign that year rated at 400–1 to win the silverware. However, it would be his final game for the club as he and a number of other senior players left the club following the departure of the manager Shaun Teale.

After an unsuccessful trial with Lincoln City in July 2003, he joined Rossendale United before moving to Matlock Town, a club his uncle Neil Fairclough had previously played for, at the end of September. He debuted for the club in the 4–0 victory at Ossett Town on 27 September 2003. and his signing coincided with the club going on a run that took them to the top of the Northern Premier League Premier Division table before eventually finishing as runners-up to Hucknall Town; Taylor was named the club's player of the season.

In June 2004, Matlock Town's manager Ernie Moss moved to Hucknall Town and he swiftly returned to his former club to sign Taylor and also his brother Joe who had been with Worksop Town.

On 31 March 2005, he joined Halifax Town until the end of the season but did not make an appearance for the club.

In August 2005 he joined Guiseley on trial, eventually joining the club permanently for the season.

Taylor combined his playing career with life as a student at Sheffield Hallam University where he played as a centre back, representing the university in the British Universities Sports Association (BUSA) championship games, catching the eye of the Team Bath manager Ged Roddy, who picked him to play as a defender in the England Universities team at the 2006 British Universities Games. He joined Team Bath in the summer of 2006 to play as a centre back whilst studying for a Diploma in Fitness Excellence at the University of Bath. Taylor enjoyed a successful season at the heart of the team's defence being named Players' Player of the Year as the team finished runners-up in the Southern League Premier Division, missing out on promotion to the Conference South after losing 1–0 to Maidenhead United in the play-off final.

=== Exeter City ===
In June 2007 he completed a move to Exeter City. He signed a new contract with the club in December, which would expire in 2010. He featured in the Conference play-off final for Exeter, which was won 1–0 and finished the season with 46 appearances and scored nine goals. He played in the club's first game on their return to the Football League, which finished as a 1–1 draw with Darlington.

=== Charlton Athletic ===
Taylor signed a two-year contract for Charlton Athletic on 1 July 2011, moving on a free transfer from Exeter City. In August 2011 he was appointed vice-captain by manager Chris Powell. He quickly established himself in the centre of defence alongside Michael Morrison, and scored his first goal for the club in an FA Cup 4–0 away win at FC Halifax, in November 2011. He was released by Charlton at the end of the 2012–13 season.

=== Bradford City ===
On 1 August 2013, Taylor signed for Bradford City on a two-year deal. He was substituted at half-time on his debut, and later suffered a foot injury. After three appearances for the Bantams and just one league game under his belt, Taylor joined fellow League One club Colchester United on a one-month loan deal on 20 September, scoring once against Bristol City.

=== Cheltenham Town ===
On 25 July 2014, Taylor joined League Two side Cheltenham Town on a two-year deal, and was made club captain. He scored his first goal for the club in a 1–1 draw with AFC Wimbledon.

=== Newport County ===
On 6 July 2015, Taylor joined League Two Newport County.

=== Bath City ===
On 8 February 2016, Taylor signed for National League South side Bath City as a player-coach.

== Managerial career ==
=== Exeter City ===
Taylor was appointed manager of League Two club Exeter City, who he had previously captained, on 1 June 2018 replacing Paul Tisdale. A bright start led to Taylor being nominated for the August 2018 EFL League Two Manager of the Month award. Taylor voiced his disappointment at missing out on the EFL League Two promotion play-offs, the side missing out on a third successive top 7 finish by a single point.

Taylor won the August 2019 EFL League Two Manager of the Month award following a strong start to Exeter's 2019–20 season, with the side winning four and drawing two of their opening six matches. A strong set of results over the festive period meant Exeter finished 2019 in second place, with Taylor himself being named EFL League Two Manager of the Month for December 2019.

With his side ending the month in fourth position after achieving thirteen points from an unbeaten five matches, Taylor was again awarded the League Two Manager of the Month award for February 2022.

Under Taylor, Exeter City won promotion to League One for the 2022–23 season after finishing second in the 2021–22 League Two table.

On 1 October 2022, following a 2–2 draw with Bristol Rovers, Exeter confirmed that they had given Taylor permission to speak to Rotherham United regarding the vacant managerial position.

=== Rotherham United ===
On 3 October 2022, Taylor was confirmed as the new Rotherham United manager, pending talks. The appointment was made official the following day, with Taylor signing a contract with the EFL Championship club until 2026, and was joined by his assistant, Wayne Carlisle. Taylor guided the club to Championship safety to conclude the 2022–23 campaign.

On 13 November 2023, Taylor was dismissed with the club sitting in 22nd position.

=== Bristol Rovers ===
On 1 December 2023, Taylor was appointed manager of League One club Bristol Rovers on a three-and-a-half-year contract. A successful first month in charge, including wins over high-flying Bolton Wanderers and Portsmouth, saw him nominated for the League One Manager of the Month for December 2023.

On 28 November 2024, Taylor took a leave of absence due to an ongoing family emergency. Having missed two fixtures, he returned to his role the following week, thanking the club's fans for their support. On 16 December 2024, following a 2–0 defeat to Birmingham City that left Bristol Rovers in 20th position, Taylor was dismissed by the club.

=== Return to Exeter City ===
On 3 March 2026, Taylor returned to manage League One club Exeter City on a short-term contract until the end of the 2025–26 season. Following his first match back in charge that same day, a 1–1 draw with Burton Albion, he said it was unlikely that he would remain at the club long-term. Taylor signed a new contract on 14 May 2026 for the following season.

== Playing style ==
Taylor began his career as a goalkeeper, before being converted to a central defender.

== Career statistics ==
As of match played 23 February 2016

Appearances and goals by club, season and competition
Club	Season	League			FA Cup		EFL Cup		Other		Total	
Club	Season	Division	Apps	Goals	Apps	Goals	Apps	Goals	Apps	Goals	Apps	Goals
Exeter City	2007–08	Conference	42	8	2	1	—		2 (Note: One appearance in FA Trophy, one appearance in Conference play-offs)	0	46	9
Exeter City	2008–09	League Two	31	2	1	0	1	0	1 (Note: Appearances in Football League Trophy / EFL Trophy)	0	34	2
Exeter City	2009–10	League One	46	5	2	2	1	0	1	0	50	7
Exeter City	2010–11	League One	28	2	0	0	1	0	3	0	32	2
Exeter City	Total		147	17	5	3	3	0	7	0	162	20
Charlton Athletic	2011–12	League One	41	0	2	1	0	0	1	0	44	1
Charlton Athletic	2012–13	Championship	12	0	1	0	1	0	—		14	0
Charlton Athletic	Total		53	0	3	1	1	0	1	0	58	1
Bradford City	2013–14	League One	2	0	0	0	1	0	1	0	4	0
Colchester United (loan)	2013–14	League One	5	1	0	0	0	0	0	0	5	1
Cheltenham Town	2014–15	League Two	33	1	1	0	0	0	2	0	36	1
Newport County	2015–16	League Two	4	0	1	0	0	0	0	0	5	0
Bath City	2015–16	National League South	1	0	0	0	—		0	0	1	0
Career total			245	19	10	4	5	0	11	0	271	23

== Managerial statistics ==
As of match played 21 November 2026

Managerial record by team and tenure
Team	From	To	Record					Ref.
Team	From	To	P	W	D	L	Win %	Ref.
Exeter City	1 June 2018	4 October 2022	227	99	68	60	43.6	
Rotherham United	4 October 2022	13 November 2023	55	10	18	27	18.2	
Bristol Rovers	1 December 2023	16 December 2024	58	18	9	31	31.0	
Exeter City	3 March 2026	Present	34	9	12	13	26.5	
Total			373	136	106	131	36.5	

== Honours ==
=== As a player ===
Charlton Athletic

- Football League One: 2011–12

=== As a manager ===
Exeter City

- EFL League Two second-place promotion: 2021–22

Individual

- EFL League Two Manager of the Month: August 2019, December 2019, February 2022, April 2022
