= Michael Jolley =

English football coach (born 1977)

Personal information
- Date of birth: 30 March 1977 (age 49)
- Place of birth: Sheffield, England

Youth career
- 1989–1993: Barnsley

College career
Years	Team	Apps	(Gls)
1995–1998	Cambridge University		

Managerial career
- 2008–2009: Stirling University
- 2008–2009: Scotland Universities Team
- 2014–2017: Burnley (U23s)
- 2017–2018: AFC Eskilstuna
- 2018–2019: Grimsby Town
- 2020–2021: Barrow
- 2022–2023: Vélez
- 2025: Bury

Michael Jolley (born 30 March 1977) is an English professional football manager who was most recently in charge of Bury.

He started coaching in 2004. He has previously held coaching positions at five professional clubs, including Crystal Palace, Nottingham Forest, Lincoln City, Crewe Alexandra and Burnley. After three years as Burnley's U23 head coach, he was appointed manager of AFC Eskilstuna in Sweden, joining the last-placed Allsvenskan club in June 2017. He left the club after it was relegated to Superettan. In March 2018, Jolley became manager at League Two club Grimsby Town before later managing Barrow, Spanish side Vélez and Bury.

== Early life ==
Born in Sheffield, Jolley was a youth player with Barnsley between 1989 and 1993. Between 1995 and 1998 Jolley attended Downing College, Cambridge, where he won three 'Blues' for representing Cambridge against Oxford University in the Varsity Football match. During his time at Cambridge Jolley gained a bachelor's degree in economics, which was subsequently converted to a master's degree.

From 1999 to 2005, Jolley was a fixed-income trader, first in London, then in New York; he worked near the World Trade Center at the time of the 11 September 2001 terrorist attacks. In 2002, Jolley returned to England to be nearer to his family, while continuing his work in banking he also moved into football coaching when he joined Crystal Palace in 2004.

== Coaching career ==
Jolley's first coaching position was at Crystal Palace Academy, commencing in 2004, spending three years at Palace, during which time the academy produced players such as Victor Moses and John Bostock. In 2007 Jolley left to take up a position with the academy of Nottingham Forest. After just over one year with Forest, Jolley was appointed high-performance football coach in August 2008 at Stirling University Football Club. Jolley coached and recruited players to the University's football scholarship programme. Stirling also won the Queen's Park Shield in Jolley's first season. Jolley also joined Falkirk as an academy coach. Jolley was also appointed head coach of the Scotland Universities Team in 2008–09. Jolley gained a Postgraduate Diploma PGDip/MSc in Sports Coaching during his time at the University of Stirling. Jolley left his roles at Stirling and Falkirk in 2009.

In 2011 Jolley was one of 16 coaches to participate in the inaugural FA Elite Coaches Award. He then had a brief role as first team coach at Lincoln City of the Conference Premier in 2012. In November 2012, he joined League One side Crewe Alexandra as an Academy coach; his under-16s team included future Crewe professionals Charlie Kirk, Harry Pickering and Callum Ainley. In July 2013 Michael Jolley was one of 16 coaches to complete the FA Elite Coaches Award.

Jolley was appointed senior professional development coach of the Burnley under-23 team on 7 July 2014. Burnley would spend two of the next three seasons in the Premier League (see List of Burnley F.C. seasons). His development squad won the Final Third Development League Cup final with a 2–1 victory over Stoke City U23s in the 2015–16 season. Jolley spent three years in the role, during which time he played a role in the development of Cameron Dummigan, Tom Anderson, Luke Conlan, Luke Hendrie, Ntumba Massanka, Josh Ginnelly, Dan Agyei, Alex Whitmore, and Aiden O'Neill. In 2015, Jolley gained the League Managers Association Diploma in Football Management, which covered influencing and negotiation, mental toughness and resilience, football finance, diversity, equality and inclusion, sport science and performance analytics and focused on leadership, personal development and wellbeing. In 2016, Jolley gained his UEFA Pro Licence, from the English Football Association.

== Managerial career ==
=== AFC Eskilstuna ===
Jolley became new manager of Swedish Premier Division, Allsvenskan side, AFC Eskilstuna on 13 June 2017, after being recommended by Sean Dyche. The team was then winless with four points from the opening 12 matches, and bottom of the league table. Under his coaching they took 15 points from the next 16 games, gaining their first ever Allsvenskan win on 15 July 2017, 2–1 against Kalmar FF in Jolley's first home game in charge, plus wins against IFK Göteborg and Malmö FF; the Malmö victory showcased Jolley's tactical thinking, receiving considerable analysis within the coaching community. A 3–2 defeat by IF Elfsborg in their penultimate home game followed by a 1–1 draw away to Halmstads BK confirmed relegation to Superettan on 23 October 2017, and Jolley left AFC Eskilstuna on 9 January 2018 by mutual consent, unable to agree on the future direction of the club.

=== Grimsby Town ===
On 2 March 2018, Jolley was appointed as the new first team manager of EFL League Two side Grimsby Town on an undisclosed rolling contract. His main task for the remainder of the season was to maintain their League Two status; he worked alongside Paul Wilkinson, who continued his previous role as assistant manager. Jolley's first game in charge was a 1–1 draw at home to Port Vale on 10 March 2018.

Jolley secured Grimsby's League status on 28 April 2018 with a 2–1 victory at home to Notts County. The final ten games of the season yielded Grimsby 15 points (four wins and three draws), after a winless run of over 20 games before Jolley took charge and led to his nomination for EFL League Two Manager of the Month for April 2018.

After retaining their EFL League Two status, the 2018–19 season began slowly with only five points and a single win in the opening ten games leading to fears that Grimsby would again be involved in a relegation battle. However, the next ten games were the most productive of Jolley's spell at the club and by Christmas Grimsby were one of the form teams in the Division leading to Jolley winning the EFL League Two Manager of the Month for December 2018 after four consecutive wins.

Further wins in the opening two rounds of the FA Cup against Milton Keynes Dons and Chesterfield saw them pitched against Premier League Crystal Palace in the third round. Roared on by over 5500 Mariner's fans only a solitary late goal edged Grimsby out despite them having to play nearly the entire game with ten men after an early red card.

The team's league form suffered again after their cup exit and it wasn't until the final game in January that they picked up their next victory against Milton Keynes Dons. They backed this up with three wins and one draw in February leading to optimistic thoughts of a late bid for the playoffs with Jolley again nominated for EFL League Two Manager of the Month. Their form fell away through March though and it was Easter Monday when they tasted victory again, closing the season out by winning two of the final three games to give a mid-table finish, equally positioned 15 points clear of relegation and 15 points short of the play-offs.

The 2019–20 season began promisingly and by the end of August Grimsby were top goalscorers in League 2 and placed fourth securing Jolley his third EFL League Two Manager of the Month nomination in six months.

EFL Cup victories over Macclesfield Town and League 1 Doncaster Rovers saw the Mariners rewarded with a plum away tie to Chelsea and by the end of September Grimsby Town continued to occupy a play off spot a quarter of the way through the season as they maintained their strong goalscoring form with a 3–1 away win at previously unbeaten Exeter City.

However it was announced that Jolley had moved on from the club by mutual consent on 15 November 2019 after only four more league games, a 1–1 draw at home to Newport County AFC in the FA Cup proving to be his final game in charge. Due to postponements his final EFL league match was a goalless draw away to Cambridge United three weeks earlier on 22 October 2019, which saw him leave Grimsby still well in touch with the promotion contenders only one point and two points respectively behind eventual play-off teams Colchester United and Northampton Town and only five points worse off than eventual Champions Swindon Town.

Later it emerged that Jolley's "expletive-laden rant" to a BBC journalist had contributed to his departure after an off-record conversation had been captured on tape in which Jolley complained about excessively negative coverage of the team and swore multiple times.

=== Barrow ===
On 23 December 2020, Jolley was announced as the new manager of EFL League Two side Barrow, signing a two-and-a-half-year contract. He was sacked by Barrow on 21 February 2021 after just eight games in the role, with the club 23rd in League Two. Chairman Paul Hornby said the board and Jolley had differing visions on how the team should play which ultimately lead to the decision to remove him as manager.

=== Vélez CF ===
In January 2023, Jolley was appointed manager of Segunda División RFEF side Vélez until the end of the season.

=== Bury ===
On 12 December 2025, Jolley was appointed manager of Northern Premier League Division One West side Bury. His appointment prompted objections from some supporters due to his 2009 conviction, despite the matter having been disclosed to the club during the recruitment process and Jolley having previously been cleared to work in football by safeguarding authorities. Two days after his appointment, Jolley announced he was not going to take up the job. In a detailed statement, he pointed to the 2009 criminal proceedings and subsequent investigations from the Scottish Government and English Football Association that established he was "deceived, and at no time acted maliciously" but described his appointment as a "distraction" and said "I do not wish my presence to deter the board from its mission of returning the club to its rightful place in the EFL."

== Personal life ==
=== Family ===
Jolley has been married to Lizzie since 2013.

He auctioned off the Manager of the Month award he received in December 2018 to raise funds for Grimsby's Fishermen's Mission, one of a number of community initiatives he undertook during his time in the role.

=== 2009 incident ===
In 2009, Jolley was involved in an incident in Scotland that led to a court appearance after a 15-year-old girl misled him about her age when they met in a Stirling nightclub on a night out and later had a sexual encounter. It was established in court that the girl and her friends that accompanied her to the nightclub had lied to him about her true age, telling him that she was 19, and that he would not have had sexual relations with her had he known her true age. This was also the conclusion of all subsequent investigations into the incident with Jolley quoting directly from one of these in a 2010 statement.

Media reports following the encounter said that the girl and her friends returned to his flat demanding money and that he was assaulted, prompting Jolley to ask a neighbour to contact the police. According to the same accounts, it was only much later that police later informed Jolley of the girl’s true age.

Under Scottish law, offences of this type carry a wide sentencing range, with courts able to impose a custodial sentence of up to 14 years or non-custodial sentences depending on the circumstances of the offence and the offender. Jolley received the minimum available sentence of a 12-month community order and placed on the Sex Offenders’ Register for the same length of time, reflecting the mitigating circumstances accepted in full by the court.

Following their own separate investigations, both the English Football Association and the Scottish Football Association concluded that Jolley posed no safeguarding risk and cleared him to continue working with young people in football. He has subsequently held a number of Academy and First Team roles at seven different professional clubs spanning three different countries and the top five divisions of English football. Jolley stated that he made all the clubs that employed him aware of the incident.

In 2018, complaints made to the press regulator IPSO resulted in corrections to media reporting of the incident by the Daily Record and the Daily Mail, with MailOnline also issuing an apology for their errors reporting the incident.

== Managerial statistics ==
As of match played 13 December 2025

Managerial record by team and tenure
Team	From	To	Record					Ref
Team	From	To	P	W	D	L	Win %	Ref
AFC Eskilstuna	1 July 2017	9 January 2018	18	4	4	10	22.2	
Grimsby Town	5 March 2018	15 November 2019	79	29	16	34	36.7	
Barrow	23 December 2020	21 February 2021	8	2	1	5	25.0	
Vélez	28 November 2022	30 July 2023	20	8	2	10	40.0	
Bury	12 December 2025	14 December 2025	1	1	0	0	100.0	
Total			125	43	23	59	33.8	

== Honours ==
=== Manager ===
Stirling University

- Queen's Park Shield: 2008–09

Burnley U23

- Central League Cup: 2015–16

Grimsby Town

- Football League Two Manager of the Month: December 2018
