= 2019–20 EFL League Two =

EFL League Two
- Season: 2019–20
- Champions: Swindon Town
- Promoted: Swindon Town; Crewe Alexandra; Plymouth Argyle; Northampton Town
- Relegated: Macclesfield Town
- Matches: 440
- Goals: 1,108 (2.52 per match)
- Top goalscorer: Eoin Doyle (25 goals)
- Biggest home win: Mansfield Town 6–1 Oldham Athletic (12 October 2019)
- Biggest away win: Crawley Town 0–4 Swindon Town (26 October 2019); Mansfield Town 0–4 Cambridge United (17 September 2019); Cambridge United 0–4 Stevenage (18 January 2020)
- Longest unbeaten run: 15 matches Colchester United
- Longest winless run: 10 matches Stevenage
- Highest attendance: 17,668; Bradford City 1–1 Grimsby Town (8 February 2020)

The 2019–20 EFL League Two (referred to as the Sky Bet League Two for sponsorship reasons) was the 16th season of Football League Two under its current title and the 28th season under its current league division format. On 13 March 2020, the EFL, alongside the FA announced the suspension of all domestic football until 3 April due to the rapidly developing COVID-19 pandemic. On 3 April 2020, this suspension was extended indefinitely.

On 15 May 2020, the clubs voted to end the season with immediate effect with the final table being determined on a points-per-game basis. No decision was made as to promotion and relegation. The play-offs would be played as normal. The decision meant Swindon Town would be crowned champions and would be joined by Crewe Alexandra and Plymouth Argyle in League One the following season.

== Team changes ==
The following teams have changed division since the 2018–19 season.

=== To League Two ===
Promoted from National League

- Leyton Orient
- Salford City

Relegated from League One

- Plymouth Argyle
- Walsall
- Scunthorpe United
- Bradford City

=== From League Two ===
Promoted to League One

- Lincoln City
- Bury (later expelled)
- Milton Keynes Dons
- Tranmere Rovers

Relegated to National League

- Notts County
- Yeovil Town

== Stadiums ==
Locations of the 2019–20 EFL League Two teams

Team	Location	Stadium	Capacity
Bradford City	Bradford	Valley Parade	25,136
Cambridge United	Cambridge	Abbey Stadium	8,127
Carlisle United	Carlisle	Brunton Park	18,202
Cheltenham Town	Cheltenham	Whaddon Road	7,066
Colchester United	Colchester	Colchester Community Stadium	10,105
Crawley Town	Crawley	Broadfield Stadium	5,996
Crewe Alexandra	Crewe	Gresty Road	10,180
Exeter City	Exeter	St. James Park	8,696
Forest Green Rovers	Nailsworth	The New Lawn	5,147
Grimsby Town	Cleethorpes	Blundell Park	9,052
Leyton Orient	London (Leyton)	Brisbane Road	9,271
Macclesfield Town	Macclesfield	Moss Rose	6,355
Mansfield Town	Mansfield	Field Mill	10,000
Morecambe	Morecambe	Globe Arena	6,476
Newport County	Newport	Rodney Parade	7,850
Northampton Town	Northampton	Sixfields Stadium	7,653
Oldham Athletic	Oldham	Boundary Park	13,512
Plymouth Argyle	Plymouth	Home Park	17,300
Port Vale	Burslem	Vale Park	19,052
Salford City	Salford	Moor Lane	5,108
Scunthorpe United	Scunthorpe	Glanford Park	9,088
Stevenage	Stevenage	Broadhall Way	6,722
Swindon Town	Swindon	County Ground	15,728
Walsall	Walsall	Bescot Stadium	11,300

== Personnel and sponsoring ==
Team	Manager	Captain	Kit manufacturer	Sponsor
Bradford City	(Scotland) Stuart McCall	(England) James Vaughan	Avec Sport	JCT600
Cambridge United	(England) Mark Bonner	(England) Greg Taylor	Hummel	Mick George
Carlisle United	(England) Chris Beech	(England) Adam Collin	Erreà	Edinburgh Woollen Mill
Cheltenham Town	(Northern Ireland) Michael Duff	(England) Ben Tozer	Erreà	Mira Showers
Colchester United	(England) John McGreal	(England) Luke Prosser	Macron	Texo Scaffolding (Home); JobServe (Away / Third)
Crawley Town	(England) John Yems	(England) Jimmy Smith	Erreà	The People's Pension
Crewe Alexandra	(Gibraltar) David Artell	(England) Perry Ng	FBT	Mornflake
Exeter City	(England) Matt Taylor	(Wales) Jake Taylor	Joma	Flybe
Forest Green Rovers	(England) Mark Cooper	(England) Joseph Mills	PlayerLayer	Ecotricity
Grimsby Town	(England) Ian Holloway	(Republic of Ireland) James McKeown	Erreà	Young's Seafood
Leyton Orient	(England) Ross Embleton	(England) Josh Coulson	New Balance	The Sun Dream Team
Macclesfield Town	(Republic of Ireland) Mark Kennedy	(Republic of Ireland) Fiacre Kelleher	Nike	Paddy Power (unbranded) (Note: The shirts of Macclesfield Town and Newport County do not display Paddy Power's logo as part of the bookmakers "Save Our Shirt" campaign.)
Mansfield Town	(Republic of Ireland) Graham Coughlan	(Barbados) Krystian Pearce	Surridge	One Call
Morecambe	(Scotland) Derek Adams	(England) Barry Roche	Macron	Annapurna Recruitment
Newport County	(Wales) Michael Flynn	(England) Joss Labadie	FBT	Paddy Power (unbranded)
Northampton Town	(England) Keith Curle	(England) Charlie Goode	Nike	University of Northampton
Oldham Athletic	(Tunisia) Dino Maamria	(France) Mohamed Maouche	Hummel	Wakelet
Plymouth Argyle	(England) Ryan Lowe	(England) Gary Sawyer	Puma	Ginsters
Port Vale	(England) John Askey	(England) Leon Legge	Erreà	Synectics Solutions
Salford City	(Scotland) Graham Alexander	(England) Liam Hogan	Kappa	Soccer Saturday Super 6
Scunthorpe United	(England) Russ Wilcox	(England) Andy Butler	FBT	Utilita Energy
Stevenage	(England) Alex Revell	(Scotland) Scott Cuthbert	Macron	Burger King
Swindon Town	(England) Richie Wellens	(England) Dion Conroy	Puma	Imagine Cruising ( home / away); Darby Rimmer MND Foundation (Third)
Walsall	(England) Darrell Clarke	(England) James Clarke	Erreà	HomeServe

== Managerial changes ==
Team	Outgoing manager	Manner of departure	Date of vacancy	Position in table	Incoming manager	Date of appointment
Walsall	(Cayman Islands) Martin O'Connor	End of caretaker spell	4 May 2019	Pre-season	(England) Darrell Clarke	10 May 2019
Scunthorpe United	(England) Andy Dawson	End of caretaker spell	4 May 2019	Pre-season	(England) Paul Hurst	13 May 2019
Plymouth Argyle	(England) Kevin Nancekivell	End of caretaker spell	4 May 2019	Pre-season	(England) Ryan Lowe	5 June 2019
Oldham Athletic	(England) Pete Wild	Resigned	4 May 2019	Pre-season	(France) Laurent Banide	11 June 2019
Mansfield Town	(England) David Flitcroft	Sacked	14 May 2019	Pre-season	(Scotland) John Dempster	14 May 2019
Leyton Orient	(England) Justin Edinburgh	Deceased	8 June 2019	Pre-season	(Wales) Carl Fletcher	16 October 2019
Macclesfield Town	(England) Sol Campbell	Mutual consent	15 August 2019	8th	(Republic of Ireland) Daryl McMahon	19 August 2019
Stevenage	(Tunisia) Dino Maamria	Sacked	9 September 2019	23rd	(England) Graham Westley	15 December 2019
Oldham Athletic	(France) Laurent Banide	Sacked	19 September 2019	21st	(Tunisia) Dino Maamria	19 September 2019
Morecambe	(England) Jim Bentley	Signed by AFC Fylde	28 October 2019	24th	(Scotland) Derek Adams	7 November 2019
Carlisle United	(Scotland) Steven Pressley	Sacked	13 November 2019	19th	(England) Chris Beech	26 November 2019
Leyton Orient	(Wales) Carl Fletcher	Sacked	14 November 2019	16th	(England) Ross Embleton	7 January 2020
Grimsby Town	(England) Michael Jolley	Mutual consent	15 November 2019	18th	(England) Ian Holloway	31 December 2019
Crawley Town	(Italy) Gabriele Cioffi	Sacked	2 December 2019	17th	(England) John Yems	5 December 2019
Mansfield Town	(Scotland) John Dempster	Sacked	14 December 2019	18th	(Republic of Ireland) Graham Coughlan	17 December 2019
Macclesfield Town	(Republic of Ireland) Daryl McMahon	Resigned	2 January 2020	22nd	(Republic of Ireland) Mark Kennedy	16 January 2020
Cambridge United	(Scotland) Colin Calderwood	Sacked	29 January 2020	16th	(England) Mark Bonner	9 March 2020
Scunthorpe United	(England) Paul Hurst	Sacked	29 January 2020	19th	(England) Russ Wilcox	12 February 2020
Bradford City	(England) Gary Bowyer	Sacked	3 February 2020	8th	(Scotland) Stuart McCall	4 February 2020
Stevenage	(England) Graham Westley	Sacked	16 February 2020	24th	(England) Alex Revell	16 February 2020

== League table ==
Pos	Team	Pld	W	D	L	GF	GA	GD	Pts	PPG	Promotion, qualification or relegation
1	Swindon Town (C, P)	36	21	6	9	62	39	+23	69	1.92	Promotion to EFL League One
2	Crewe Alexandra (P)	37	20	9	8	67	43	+24	69	1.86	Promotion to EFL League One
3	Plymouth Argyle (P)	37	20	8	9	61	39	+22	68	1.84	Promotion to EFL League One
4	Cheltenham Town	36	17	13	6	52	27	+25	64	1.78	Qualification for League Two play-offs (Note: Four teams play for one spot and promotion to EFL League One.)
5	Exeter City	37	18	11	8	53	43	+10	65	1.76	Qualification for League Two play-offs
6	Colchester United	37	15	13	9	52	37	+15	58	1.57	Qualification for League Two play-offs
7	Northampton Town (O, P)	37	17	7	13	54	40	+14	58	1.57	Qualification for League Two play-offs
8	Port Vale	37	14	15	8	50	44	+6	57	1.54	
9	Bradford City	37	14	12	11	44	40	+4	54	1.46	
10	Forest Green Rovers	36	13	10	13	43	40	+3	49	1.36	
11	Salford City	37	13	11	13	49	46	+3	50	1.35	
12	Walsall	36	13	8	15	40	49	−9	47	1.31	
13	Crawley Town	37	11	15	11	51	47	+4	48	1.30	
14	Newport County	36	12	10	14	32	39	−7	46	1.28	
15	Grimsby Town	37	12	11	14	45	51	−6	47	1.27	
16	Cambridge United	37	12	9	16	40	48	−8	45	1.22	
17	Leyton Orient	36	10	12	14	47	55	−8	42	1.17	
18	Carlisle United	37	10	12	15	39	56	−17	42	1.14	
19	Oldham Athletic	37	9	14	14	44	57	−13	41	1.11	
20	Scunthorpe United	37	10	10	17	44	56	−12	40	1.08	
21	Mansfield Town	36	9	11	16	48	55	−7	38	1.06	
22	Morecambe	37	7	11	19	35	60	−25	32	0.86	
23	Stevenage	36	3	13	20	24	50	−26	22	0.61	Reprieved from relegation (Note: As a result of Bury's expulsion from League One, only one team is relegated to maintain League Two at 24 teams.)
24	Macclesfield Town (R)	37	7	15	15	32	47	−15	19 (Note: Macclesfield Town were deducted a total of 17 points for various infractions. They were deducted six points for failing to both pay their players' wages and to fulfil a fixture, reduced to four points after appeal. A further seven-point deduction was given for failing to play December's match against Plymouth Argyle. A further two-point deduction was given for breaches of regulations over non-payment of wages. On 3 July the EFL appealed against the independent disciplinary panel's sanctions, and a further four points were deducted on 11 August 2020, resulting in Macclesfield Town being relegated.)	0.51	Relegation to the National League

Source: EFL Official Website
Rules for classification: 1) Points per game; 2) Goal difference; 3) Number of goals scored; 4) Head-to-head results; 5) Wins; 6) Away goals; 7) Penalty points (sec 9.5); 8) 12-point sending off offences
(C) Champions; (O) Play-off winners; (P) Promoted; (R) Relegated

== Play-offs ==
Semi-finals
4	Cheltenham Town	2	0	2
7	Northampton Town	0	3	3
5	Exeter City	0	3	3
6	Colchester United	1	1	2

Final
7	Northampton Town	4
5	Exeter City	0

== Results ==
Home \ Away	BRA	CAM	CAR	CHE	COL	CRA	CRE	EXE	FGR	GRI	LEY	MAC	MAN	MOR	NEW	NOR	OLD	PLY	POR	SAL	SCU	STE	SWI	WAL
Bradford City	—	0–0	3–1	1–1		2–1		2–0	0–1	1–1			2–0	1–0	1–0	2–1	3–0	2–1	1–2	1–1	2–2	3–1	2–1	
Cambridge United	2–1	—	1–2		2–1	2–1		4–0	0–1	0–0	2–3	2–2	2–3	1–0	0–0		1–2	1–0		0–4	3–2	0–4	0–1	
Carlisle United	0–0	0–0	—	0–1	0–3	2–1	2–4	1–3	0–0	0–0		2–1	0–2	2–2	2–0	0–2	1–0	0–3		2–2			1–1	2–1
Cheltenham Town	3–2	1–1	2–0	—	1–1		1–1		1–2		2–1	3–0	1–0	2–1		2–1	3–0	0–1	0–0		4–1	4–2	2–2	3–1
Colchester United	0–0	1–2	3–0	0–2	—	1–1		2–2		2–3	2–1	2–1		0–1	3–1	1–0		3–0	1–1	1–0		3–1	3–1	0–0
Crawley Town	2–1		0–0	1–0	2–1	—	1–2	0–1	1–1	3–2			1–0	1–1		4–0	3–0	2–2	0–0	2–0	3–1	2–0	0–4	2–3
Crewe Alexandra	2–1	2–3	4–1	1–0	0–0	2–1	—	1–1			2–0	2–0	1–1	5–0			2–1	0–3	0–1	4–1	3–1	3–1	3–1	1–0
Exeter City		2–0		0–0	0–0	1–1	1–1	—	1–0	1–3	2–2	1–0	1–0		1–0	3–2	5–1	4–0	2–0			2–1	1–1	3–3
Forest Green Rovers			1–4		1–0	3–1	0–0	0–1	—	1–0		1–0	2–2		0–2		1–0	0–1	2–3	1–2	0–2	0–0	2–2	1–2
Grimsby Town	1–1			0–0	2–2	1–1	0–2	0–1	2–2	—	0–4	1–0	0–1	2–1	4–2	0–3			5–2	1–0	0–1	3–1	0–3	
Leyton Orient	0–0	2–1	1–1	1–0	1–3	2–3	1–2		2–4	1–1	—	1–1	2–1		2–1	1–1	2–2		3–3		0–2	0–0	1–3	3–1
Macclesfield Town	1–1	1–0			1–1	1–1	1–1	2–3	2–1	1–1	3–0	—	0–0	0–1	1–1	0–1	1–1	1–1	2–1	0–2	1–0			
Mansfield Town	3–0	0–4	2–2	0–3	2–3				3–4	0–1	2–3		—	2–2	1–0	1–1	6–1	0–1	2–2	1–2	2–0	0–0		
Morecambe	1–2	1–1	1–1	0–0	1–1		1–1	2–3	0–2	0–2	1–0	2–0	1–1	—	2–1	2–2	1–2		2–1	2–2				0–1
Newport County	2–1	0–1	1–0	1–1		1–1	1–0	1–1			1–1	1–0	2–2	1–0	—		0–1	1–0	1–0	1–2	2–1	1–1	2–0	0–0
Northampton Town		2–0		1–1		2–2	4–1	2–0	1–0	2–0	0–1	1–2	1–2	4–1	2–0	—		3–1	0–1	2–0	3–0	1–0	0–1	0–1
Oldham Athletic	3–0		1–1	1–1	0–1	2–1	1–2	0–0	1–1	2–2	1–1	0–1	3–1	3–1	5–0	2–2	—			1–4	0–2			2–0
Plymouth Argyle	2–1	0–0	2–0	0–2	1–0	2–2	2–1			3–0	4–0	3–0	3–1	3–0	1–0		2–2	—		2–2	2–2	2–1	1–2	3–0
Port Vale		1–0	2–1	1–1	3–0			3–1	2–1		1–0	2–2	2–2	3–1		1–1	0–0	1–0	—	1–1	2–2	1–1	2–0	0–1
Salford City	2–0	1–0		0–2	1–2	0–0	3–1	0–1	0–4	1–0	1–1	0–0				1–2	1–1	2–3	1–1	—	1–1	2–0	2–3	1–2
Scunthorpe United	1–1	0–2	0–1	1–0	2–2	2–2	2–2	3–1	1–0	0–2				3–0	1–2	3–0	2–2	1–3	2–1		—	0–0	0–2	0–2
Stevenage	0–1	1–1	2–3		0–0	0–0	1–5	0–1	0–0	2–1	0–3	2–2		1–0		0–1	0–0	1–2	0–1	0–1		—		
Swindon Town	1–1	4–0	3–2		0–3		3–1	2–1	0–2	3–1		3–0	1–0	3–1	0–2	0–1	2–0	1–1	3–0		2–0	1–0	—	2–1
Walsall	0–1	2–1	1–2	1–2		2–1	1–2	3–1	1–1	1–3	1–0	1–1	1–2	0–2	0–0	3–2			2–2	0–3	1–0	0–0		—

Updated to match(es) played on 10 March 2020. Source: EFL Official Website
Legend: Blue = home team win; Yellow = draw; Red = away team win.
For upcoming matches, an "a" indicates there is an article about the rivalry between the two participants.

== Season statistics ==
=== Top scorers ===
As of 7 March 2020

Rank	Player	Club	Goals
1	(Republic of Ireland) Eoin Doyle	Swindon Town	25
2	(England) Nicky Maynard	Mansfield Town	14
3	(England) Ryan Bowman	Exeter City	13
3	(England) Ollie Palmer	Crawley Town	13
3	(England) Jerry Yates	Swindon Town	13
6	(Democratic Republic of the Congo) Bez Lubala	Crawley Town	12
6	(England) Chris Porter	Crewe Alexandra	12
8	(Jamaica) Theo Robinson	Colchester United	11
8	(England) Danny Rose	Mansfield Town	11
8	(England) James Vaughan	Bradford City	11
11	(England) Antoni Sarcevic	Plymouth Argyle	10
11	(Netherlands) Kevin van Veen	Scunthorpe United	10

=== Hat-tricks ===
Player	For	Against	Result	Date	Ref
(England) Nicky Maynard	Mansfield Town	Oldham Athletic	6–1 (H)	12 October 2019	
(Republic of Ireland) Eoin Doyle	Swindon Town	Crawley Town	4–0 (A)	26 October 2019	
(England) Keshi Anderson	Swindon Town	Cambridge United	4–0 (H)	26 December 2019	
(England) Nicky Maynard	Mansfield Town	Cambridge United	3–2 (A)	1 January 2020	
