= 2018–19 EFL League Two =

EFL League Two
- Season: 2018–19
- Champions: Lincoln City (2nd title)
- Promoted: Lincoln City; Bury; Milton Keynes Dons; Tranmere Rovers
- Relegated: Notts County; Yeovil Town
- Matches: 552
- Goals: 1,409 (2.55 per match)
- Top goalscorer: James Norwood (29 goals)
- Biggest home win: Crewe Alexandra 6–0 Morecambe (4 August 2018); Colchester United 6–0 Crewe Alexandra (21 August 2018); Carlisle United 6–0 Oldham Athletic (26 December 2018); Milton Keynes Dons 6–0 Cambridge United (1 January 2019)
- Biggest away win: Newport County 0–6 Yeovil Town (15 September 2018)
- Highest scoring: Port Vale 2–6 Lincoln City (13 October 2018)
- Longest winning run: 7 matches Tranmere Rovers
- Longest unbeaten run: 19 matches Lincoln City
- Longest winless run: 13 matches Macclesfield Town
- Longest losing run: 6 matches Grimsby Town; Notts County; Yeovil Town
- Highest attendance: 20,718; Milton Keynes Dons 1–0 Mansfield Town (4 May 2019)
- Lowest attendance: 1,355; Morecambe 0–1 Mansfield Town (23 October 2018)
- Total attendance: 2,461,975
- Average attendance: 4,468

The 2018–19 EFL League Two (referred to as the Sky Bet League Two for sponsorship reasons) was the 15th season of Football League Two under its current title and the 26th season under its current league division format.

== Team changes ==
=== To League Two ===
Promoted from National League

- Macclesfield Town
- Tranmere Rovers

Relegated from League One

- Bury
- Milton Keynes Dons
- Northampton Town
- Oldham Athletic

=== From League Two ===
Promoted to League One

- Accrington Stanley
- Luton Town
- Wycombe Wanderers
- Coventry City

Relegated to National League

- Chesterfield
- Barnet

== Stadiums ==
Locations of the 2018–19 EFL League Two teams

Team	Location	Stadium	Capacity
Bury	Bury	Gigg Lane	11,840
Cambridge United	Cambridge	Abbey Stadium	8,127
Carlisle United	Carlisle	Brunton Park	17,949
Cheltenham Town	Cheltenham	Whaddon Road	7,066
Colchester United	Colchester	Colchester Community Stadium	10,105
Crawley Town	Crawley	Broadfield Stadium	5,996
Crewe Alexandra	Crewe	Gresty Road	10,180
Exeter City	Exeter	St James Park	6,087 (Note: Capacity temporarily reduced due to redevelopment work.)
Forest Green Rovers	Nailsworth	The New Lawn	5,147
Grimsby Town	Cleethorpes	Blundell Park	9,052
Lincoln City	Lincoln	Sincil Bank	10,120
Macclesfield Town	Macclesfield	Moss Rose	6,355
Mansfield Town	Mansfield	Field Mill	10,000
Milton Keynes Dons	Milton Keynes	Stadium MK	30,500
Morecambe	Morecambe	Globe Arena	6,476
Newport County	Newport	Rodney Parade	7,850
Northampton Town	Northampton	Sixfields Stadium	7,653
Notts County	Nottingham	Meadow Lane	19,588
Oldham Athletic	Oldham	Boundary Park	13,512
Port Vale	Burslem	Vale Park	19,052
Stevenage	Stevenage	Broadhall Way	6,722
Swindon Town	Swindon	County Ground	15,728
Tranmere Rovers	Birkenhead	Prenton Park	16,789
Yeovil Town	Yeovil	Huish Park	9,566

== Personnel and sponsoring ==
Team	Manager^{1}	Captain	Kit manufacturer	Sponsor
Bury	(England) Ryan Lowe	(Republic of Ireland) Stephen Dawson	Admiral	PaySec
Cambridge United	(Scotland) Colin Calderwood		Puma	Mick George
Carlisle United	(Scotland) Steven Pressley	(England) Danny Grainger	Umbro	Edinburgh Woollen Mill
Cheltenham Town	(Northern Ireland) Michael Duff	(England) Johnny Mullins	Erreà	Mira Showers
Colchester United	(England) John McGreal	(England) Luke Prosser	Macron	JobServe
Crawley Town	(Italy) Gabriele Cioffi	(England) Jimmy Smith	Erreà	The People's Pension
Crewe Alexandra	(Gibraltar) David Artell	(Wales) George Ray	FBT	Mornflake
Exeter City	(England) Matt Taylor	(Wales) Jake Taylor	Joma	Flybe
Forest Green Rovers	(England) Mark Cooper	(England) Lee Collins	PlayerLayer	Ecotricity
Grimsby Town	(England) Michael Jolley	(England) John Welsh	Erreà	Young's Seafood
Lincoln City	(England) Danny Cowley	(Republic of Ireland) Lee Frecklington	Erreà	NSUK
Macclesfield Town	(England) Sol Campbell	(England) Jared Hodgkiss	Macron	Arighi Bianchi
Mansfield Town	(England) David Flitcroft	(Barbados) Krystian Pearce	Surridge	One Call
Milton Keynes Dons	(England) Paul Tisdale	(England) Dean Lewington	Erreà	Suzuki
Morecambe	(England) Jim Bentley	(England) Barry Roche	Macron	BizLoans4U
Newport County	(Wales) Michael Flynn	(Wales) Andrew Crofts	FBT	Interbet
Northampton Town	(England) Keith Curle	(Northern Ireland) David Buchanan	Nike	University of Northampton
Notts County	(England) Neal Ardley	(Wales) Richard Duffy	Puma	Bassingfield Wood Yard
Oldham Athletic	(England) Pete Wild	(England) Peter Clarke	Sondico	PFE Express
Port Vale	(England) John Askey	(England) Tom Pope	BLK	Manorshop.com
Stevenage	(Tunisia) Dino Maamria	(England) Ronnie Henry	Macron	Astute Electronics
Swindon Town	(England) Richie Wellens	(England) Olly Lancashire	Puma	Imagine Cruising
Tranmere Rovers	(Scotland) Micky Mellon	(England) Steve McNulty	Puma	B&M Waste Services
Yeovil Town	(England) Darren Sarll	(England) James Bailey	TAG	Jones Building Group

- ^{1} According to current revision of List of current Premier League and English Football League managers.

== Managerial changes ==
Team	Outgoing manager	Manner of departure	Date of vacancy	Position in table	Incoming manager	Date of appointment
Carlisle United	(England) Keith Curle	Resigned	5 May 2018	Pre-season	(Republic of Ireland) John Sheridan	5 June 2018
Milton Keynes Dons	(England) Keith Millen	End of caretaker spell	5 May 2018	Pre-season	(England) Paul Tisdale	6 June 2018
Exeter City	(England) Paul Tisdale	End of contract	1 June 2018	Pre-season	(England) Matt Taylor	1 June 2018
Macclesfield Town	(England) John Askey	Signed by Shrewsbury Town	1 June 2018	Pre-season	(England) Mark Yates	19 June 2018
Oldham Athletic	(England) Richie Wellens	Sacked	8 June 2018	Pre-season	(England) Frankie Bunn	13 June 2018
Cheltenham Town	(England) Gary Johnson	Sacked	21 August 2018	21st	(Northern Ireland) Michael Duff	10 September 2018
Notts County	(England) Kevin Nolan	Sacked	26 August 2018	24th	(Australia) Harry Kewell	31 August 2018
Crawley Town	(Australia) Harry Kewell	Signed by Notts County	31 August 2018	14th	(Italy) Gabriele Cioffi	7 September 2018
Northampton Town	(England) Dean Austin	Mutual consent	1 October 2018	21st	(England) Keith Curle	1 October 2018
Macclesfield Town	(England) Mark Yates	Sacked	8 October 2018	24th	(England) Sol Campbell	27 November 2018
Swindon Town	(England) Phil Brown	Sacked	12 November 2018	17th	(England) Richie Wellens	13 November 2018
Notts County	(Australia) Harry Kewell	Sacked	13 November 2018	22nd	(England) Neal Ardley	24 November 2018
Cambridge United	(Republic of Ireland) Joe Dunne	Sacked	1 December 2018	22nd	(Scotland) Colin Calderwood	19 December 2018
Oldham Athletic	(England) Frankie Bunn	Sacked	27 December 2018	12th	(England) Paul Scholes	10 February 2019
Carlisle United	(Republic of Ireland) John Sheridan	Resigned	4 January 2019	7th	(Scotland) Steven Pressley	16 January 2019
Port Vale	(England) Neil Aspin	Resigned	30 January 2019	18th	(England) John Askey	4 February 2019
Oldham Athletic	(England) Paul Scholes	Resigned	14 March 2019	14th	(England) Pete Wild	15 March 2019
Yeovil Town	(England) Darren Way	Sacked	24 March 2019	22nd	(England) Darren Sarll	19 June 2019

== League table ==
Pos	Team	Pld	W	D	L	GF	GA	GD	Pts	Promotion, qualification or relegation
1	Lincoln City (C, P)	46	23	16	7	73	43	+30	85	Promotion to EFL League One
2	Bury (P)	46	22	13	11	82	56	+26	79	Promotion to EFL League One
3	Milton Keynes Dons (P)	46	23	10	13	71	49	+22	79	Promotion to EFL League One
4	Mansfield Town	46	20	16	10	69	41	+28	76	Qualification for League Two play-offs (Note: Four teams play for one spot and promotion to EFL League One.)
5	Forest Green Rovers	46	20	14	12	68	47	+21	74	Qualification for League Two play-offs
6	Tranmere Rovers (O, P)	46	20	13	13	63	50	+13	73	Qualification for League Two play-offs
7	Newport County	46	20	11	15	59	59	0	71	Qualification for League Two play-offs
8	Colchester United	46	20	10	16	65	53	+12	70	
9	Exeter City	46	19	13	14	60	49	+11	70	
10	Stevenage	46	20	10	16	59	55	+4	70	
11	Carlisle United	46	20	8	18	67	62	+5	68	
12	Crewe Alexandra	46	19	8	19	60	59	+1	65	
13	Swindon Town	46	16	16	14	59	56	+3	64	
14	Oldham Athletic	46	16	14	16	67	60	+7	62	
15	Northampton Town	46	14	19	13	64	63	+1	61	
16	Cheltenham Town	46	15	12	19	57	68	−11	57	
17	Grimsby Town	46	16	8	22	45	56	−11	56	
18	Morecambe	46	14	12	20	54	70	−16	54	
19	Crawley Town	46	15	8	23	51	68	−17	53	
20	Port Vale	46	12	13	21	39	55	−16	49	
21	Cambridge United	46	12	11	23	40	66	−26	47	
22	Macclesfield Town	46	10	14	22	48	74	−26	44	
23	Notts County (R)	46	9	14	23	48	84	−36	41	Relegation to the National League
24	Yeovil Town (R)	46	9	13	24	41	66	−25	40	Relegation to the National League

Source: EFL Official Website
Rules for classification: 1) Points; 2) Goal difference; 3) Number of goals scored; 4) Head-to-head results
(C) Champions; (O) Play-off winners; (P) Promoted; (R) Relegated

== Play-offs ==
Semi-finals
4	Mansfield Town	1	0	1 (3)
7	Newport County (p)	1	0	1 (5)
5	Forest Green Rovers	0	1	1
6	Tranmere Rovers	1	1	2

Final
7	Newport County	0
6	Tranmere Rovers	1

== Results ==
Home \ Away	BUR	CAM	CAR	CHL	COL	CRA	CRE	EXE	FGR	GRI	LIN	MAC	MAN	MKD	MOR	NEW	NOR	NOT	OLD	POR	STE	SWI	TRA	YEO
Bury	—	0–3	0–1	4–1	2–0	1–1	3–1	2–0	1–1	4–0	3–3	3–0	2–2	4–3	3–2	1–1	3–1	4–0	3–1	1–1	4–0	1–3	2–1	1–0
Cambridge United	2–2	—	1–2	0–1	0–1	2–1	0–0	0–2	1–3	1–0	1–2	1–0	1–1	0–1	1–2	0–3	3–2	3–2	1–1	1–0	2–0	0–0	0–0	0–0
Carlisle United	3–2	2–2	—	2–0	4–0	4–2	1–0	1–1	1–2	0–1	1–0	2–1	3–2	2–3	0–2	3–2	2–2	1–3	6–0	2–1	0–1	2–1	0–2	0–1
Cheltenham Town	1–1	2–0	0–1	—	1–3	0–1	0–0	1–1	2–2	2–1	0–2	3–2	2–2	3–1	2–2	2–1	3–1	4–1	0–0	1–0	0–2	3–2	1–3	1–0
Colchester United	1–2	3–0	1–1	3–0	—	3–1	6–0	1–1	0–3	1–0	1–0	1–0	2–3	2–0	0–0	3–0	1–2	3–3	0–2	2–0	1–2	1–0	0–2	3–1
Crawley Town	3–2	2–0	2–3	1–0	2–0	—	3–0	1–1	1–2	2–1	0–3	1–1	0–0	0–4	2–0	4–1	0–1	1–1	0–3	0–1	1–3	2–2	3–1	3–1
Crewe Alexandra	1–1	2–0	2–1	1–3	2–1	6–1	—	1–2	4–3	2–0	2–1	3–0	0–3	0–0	6–0	3–2	0–2	3–0	0–2	0–1	1–0	1–0	3–2	2–0
Exeter City	0–1	1–0	3–1	3–1	3–0	1–3	1–0	—	1–2	1–2	0–3	0–1	1–4	3–1	0–0	1–1	2–2	5–1	1–0	2–0	1–0	2–0	0–1	2–1
Forest Green Rovers	1–2	2–1	1–1	1–1	0–1	1–0	1–0	0–0	—	3–0	1–2	2–0	1–1	1–2	0–1	1–1	2–1	1–2	1–1	1–1	0–0	1–1	3–1	3–0
Grimsby Town	0–0	0–2	1–0	1–0	1–0	1–0	2–0	0–0	1–4	—	1–1	0–2	0–1	1–0	1–2	3–0	0–0	4–0	0–3	2–0	0–2	2–1	5–2	0–1
Lincoln City	2–1	1–1	2–2	1–1	0–3	0–1	1–0	1–1	2–1	1–0	—	1–1	1–1	2–1	3–1	3–2	1–1	3–1	2–0	1–1	2–2	4–1	0–0	1–0
Macclesfield Town	1–4	1–1	2–1	1–1	1–1	2–0	3–3	3–2	1–1	0–2	1–2	—	1–1	1–3	1–1	0–0	0–5	0–1	2–1	0–0	2–2	1–2	1–1	1–0
Mansfield Town	2–1	1–0	1–0	4–2	1–1	1–0	1–2	1–2	1–0	2–1	1–1	3–1	—	1–1	4–0	3–0	4–0	2–0	0–0	1–0	1–2	0–0	3–0	0–1
Milton Keynes Dons	1–0	6–0	2–0	3–0	0–1	1–0	0–1	1–0	1–1	1–1	0–2	2–0	1–0	—	2–0	2–0	1–0	2–1	2–1	1–1	1–1	2–3	1–1	2–0
Morecambe	2–3	3–0	0–2	4–0	0–1	1–0	2–2	0–2	3–0	1–1	0–2	2–1	0–1	4–2	—	1–1	1–0	1–1	0–2	2–2	1–2	0–1	3–4	2–1
Newport County	3–1	4–2	2–0	1–0	2–0	0–0	1–0	1–0	1–4	1–0	1–0	3–3	1–0	0–1	1–1	—	3–1	3–2	2–0	0–0	2–1	0–0	0–0	0–6
Northampton Town	0–0	2–2	3–0	1–3	0–4	0–0	2–0	2–1	2–1	2–2	0–1	3–1	1–1	2–2	1–1	1–0	—	0–0	2–1	1–2	1–1	1–1	1–1	2–2
Notts County	0–0	0–1	1–1	0–3	0–0	3–1	2–1	0–1	1–3	2–1	1–1	1–2	1–0	1–2	0–0	1–4	2–2	—	0–0	0–0	3–3	1–2	3–2	0–4
Oldham Athletic	4–2	3–1	1–3	2–0	3–3	2–1	1–1	2–3	0–0	2–0	1–1	3–1	3–2	1–2	1–2	0–1	2–5	2–0	—	0–1	1–1	2–2	2–0	4–1
Port Vale	1–0	3–0	0–1	2–2	0–3	1–0	1–0	1–1	0–2	0–1	2–6	0–1	2–1	0–2	0–1	1–2	2–0	2–2	1–4	—	1–4	0–1	1–2	3–0
Stevenage	0–1	0–1	3–0	2–0	3–1	2–1	0–1	1–1	0–2	1–0	0–1	1–0	1–3	3–2	1–0	1–0	1–2	0–3	3–2	0–0	—	2–0	2–2	1–0
Swindon Town	1–2	0–2	0–4	0–0	3–0	0–1	1–2	0–2	2–0	1–1	2–2	3–2	0–0	1–1	4–0	2–1	1–1	3–1	0–0	0–0	3–2	—	3–2	1–1
Tranmere Rovers	1–1	1–0	3–0	1–0	1–1	5–1	1–0	2–0	0–1	4–1	1–0	1–0	0–0	2–1	3–1	0–1	1–2	1–0	1–1	1–0	2–0	1–2	—	0–0
Yeovil Town	0–1	1–0	0–0	1–4	1–1	0–1	1–1	2–2	1–2	1–3	0–2	0–2	2–2	1–1	3–2	1–3	1–1	2–0	0–0	0–3	2–0	0–3	0–0	—

Updated to match(es) played on 4 May 2019. Source: EFL Official Website
Legend: Blue = home team win; Yellow = draw; Red = away team win.
For upcoming matches, an "a" indicates there is an article about the rivalry between the two participants.

== Statistics ==
=== Top scorers ===
As of 4 May 2019

Rank	Player	Club	Goals
1	(England) James Norwood	Tranmere Rovers	29
2	(England) Tyler Walker	Mansfield Town	21
2	(England) Nicky Maynard	Bury	21
4	(England) Kieran Agard	Milton Keynes Dons	20
5	(England) Chuks Aneke	Milton Keynes Dons	17
6	(England) Jayden Stockley	Exeter City	16
7	(Republic of Ireland) Jay O'Shea	Bury	15
7	(England) John Akinde	Lincoln City	15
9	(England) Ollie Palmer	Crawley Town	14
9	(England) Luke Varney	Cheltenham Town	14
9	(Republic of Ireland) Padraig Amond	Newport County	14

=== Hat-tricks ===
Player	For	Against	Result	Date	Ref
(Wales) Michael Doughty	Swindon Town	Macclesfield Town	3–2 (H)	4 August 2018	
(England) Alex Fisher	Yeovil Town	Notts County	0–4 (A)	17 August 2018	
(England) Matt Crooks	Northampton Town	Macclesfield Town	0–5 (A)	23 October 2018	
(England) Chris O'Grady	Oldham Athletic	Bury	4–2 (H)	15 December 2018	
(England) Jayden Stockley	Exeter City	Oldham Athletic	2–3 (A)	22 December 2018	
(Wales) George Williams	Forest Green Rovers	Newport County	1–4 (A)	26 December 2018	
