= EFL League Two =

English association football league

- Organising body: English Football League
- Founded: 2004; 22 years ago: 1992–2004 (as Division Three); 1958–1992 (as Division Four)
- Country: England
- Other club from: Wales
- Confederation: UEFA
- Chairman: Rick Parry
- Chief Executive Officer: Trevor Birch
- Number of clubs: 24
- Level on pyramid: 4
- Promotion to: EFL League One
- Relegation to: National League
- Domestic cup: FA Cup
- League cups: EFL Cup; EFL Trophy
- International cups: UEFA Europa League (via FA Cup); UEFA Conference League (via EFL Cup)
- Current champions: Bromley; 1st League Two title 1st fourth tier title (2025–26)
- Most championships: Chesterfield; Doncaster Rovers (4 titles total, 2 League Two titles each)
- Broadcasters: List of broadcasters
- Sponsor: Sky Bet
- Website: efl.com/league-two
- Current: 2026–27 EFL League Two

The English Football League Two is the third and lowest division of the English Football League (EFL) and the fourth-highest tier in the English football league system, after the Premier League, EFL Championship and the EFL League One, and above the English National League. It is contested by 24 professional clubs.

Introduced for the 2004–05 English football season as Football League Two, it is a rebrand of the former Football League Third Division.

As of the 2025–26 season, Newport County holds the longest tenure in this division following their promotion in the 2012–13 season. There are currently two former Premier League clubs competing in this division: Oldham Athletic (1992–94) and Swindon Town (1993–94).

The current League Two champions are Bromley.

== Structure ==
There are 24 clubs in the division. Each club plays each of the other clubs twice (once at home and once away) for a total of 46 matches per season and is awarded three points for a win, one for a draw and no points for a loss. From these points a league table is constructed.

At the end of each season the top three teams, together with the winner of the play-offs between the teams which finished in the fourth to seventh positions, are promoted to EFL League One and are replaced by the four teams that finished at the bottom of that division.

The two teams that finish at the bottom of League Two are relegated to the National League and are replaced by the team that finished first and the team that won the second through seventh place play-off in that division. Technically a team can be reprieved from relegation if the team replacing them does not have a ground suitable for League football, but in practice this is a non-factor because every team currently in the National League has a ground that meets the League criteria. The other way that a team can be spared relegation is if another team either resigns or is expelled from the EFL.

Final league position is determined, in order, by points obtained, goal difference, goals scored, a mini-league of the results between two or more teams ranked using the previous three criteria, and finally a series of one or more play-off matches.

There is a mandatory wage cap in this division that limits spending on players' wages to 55% of club turnover.

== Current members ==
Locations of the 2026–27 EFL League Two teams

Note: Table lists in alphabetical order.

Team	Location	Stadium	Capacity
Accrington Stanley	Accrington	Crown Ground	5,450
Barnet	London (Canons Park)	The Hive Stadium	6,500
Bristol Rovers	Bristol (Horfield)	Memorial Stadium	12,500
Cheltenham Town	Cheltenham	Whaddon Road	7,066
Chesterfield	Chesterfield	SMH Group Stadium	10,504
Colchester United	Colchester	Colchester Community Stadium	10,105
Crawley Town	Crawley	Broadfield Stadium	5,996
Crewe Alexandra	Crewe	Gresty Road	10,153
Exeter City	Exeter	St James Park	8,219
Fleetwood Town	Fleetwood	Highbury Stadium	5,327
Gillingham	Gillingham	Priestfield Stadium	11,582
Grimsby Town	Cleethorpes	Blundell Park	9,052
Newport County	Newport	Rodney Parade	7,850
Northampton Town	Northampton (Sixfields)	Sixfields Stadium	8,203
Oldham Athletic	Oldham	Boundary Park	13,513
Port Vale	Stoke-on-Trent (Burslem)	Vale Park	16,800
Rochdale	Rochdale	Spotland Stadium	10,249
Rotherham United	Rotherham	New York Stadium	12,021
Salford City	Salford	Moor Lane	5,108
Shrewsbury Town	Shrewsbury	New Meadow	9,875
Swindon Town	Swindon	County Ground	15,728
Tranmere Rovers	Birkenhead (Prenton)	Prenton Park	16,789
Walsall	Walsall (Bescot)	Bescot Stadium	11,300
York City	York	York Community Stadium	8,500

== Teams promoted from League Two ==
Season	Champions	Points	Runners-up	Points	Third place	Points	Promoted via play-off	League position	Points
2004–05	Yeovil Town	83	Scunthorpe United	80	Swansea City	80	Southend United	4th	78
2005–06	Carlisle United	86	Northampton Town	83	Leyton Orient	81	Cheltenham Town	5th	72
2006–07	Walsall	89	Hartlepool United	88	Swindon Town	85	Bristol Rovers	6th	72
2007–08	Milton Keynes Dons	97	Peterborough United	92	Hereford United	88	Stockport County	4th	82
2008–09	Brentford	85	Exeter City	79	Wycombe Wanderers	78	Gillingham	5th	75
2009–10	Notts County	93	Bournemouth	83	Rochdale	82	Dagenham & Redbridge	7th	72
2010–11	Chesterfield	86	Bury	81	Wycombe Wanderers	81	Stevenage	6th	69
2011–12	Swindon Town	93	Shrewsbury Town	88	Crawley Town	84	Crewe Alexandra	7th	72
2012–13	Gillingham	83	Rotherham United	79	Port Vale	78	Bradford City	7th	69
2013–14	Chesterfield	84	Scunthorpe United	81	Rochdale	81	Fleetwood Town	4th	76
2014–15	Burton Albion	94	Shrewsbury Town	89	Bury	85	Southend United	5th	84
2015–16	Northampton Town	99	Oxford United	86	Bristol Rovers	85	AFC Wimbledon	7th	75
2016–17	Portsmouth	87	Plymouth Argyle	87	Doncaster Rovers	85	Blackpool	7th	70
2017–18	Accrington Stanley	93	Luton Town	88	Wycombe Wanderers	84	Coventry City	6th	75
2018–19	Lincoln City	85	Bury	79	Milton Keynes Dons	79	Tranmere Rovers	6th	73
2019–20 (Note: The teams listed for this season were ranked using points per game following the curtailment of the season due to the COVID-19 pandemic in the United Kingdom.)	Swindon Town	88.32	Crewe Alexandra	85.56	Plymouth Argyle	84.64	Northampton Town	7th	72.22
2020–21	Cheltenham Town	82	Cambridge United	80	Bolton Wanderers	79	Morecambe	4th	78
2021–22	Forest Green Rovers	84	Exeter City	84	Bristol Rovers	80	Port Vale	5th	78
2022–23	Leyton Orient	91	Stevenage	85	Northampton Town	83	Carlisle United	5th	76
2023–24	Stockport County	92	Wrexham	88	Mansfield Town	86	Crawley Town	7th	70
2024–25	Doncaster Rovers	84	Port Vale	80	Bradford City	78	AFC Wimbledon	5th	73
2025–26	Bromley	87	Milton Keynes Dons	86	Cambridge United	82	Notts County	5th	80

== Play-off results ==
Season	Semi-final (1st leg)	Semi-final (2nd leg)	Final
2004–05	Lincoln City 1–0 Macclesfield Town; Northampton Town 0–0 Southend United	Macclesfield Town 1–1 Lincoln City; Southend United 1–0 Northampton Town	Lincoln City 0–2 Southend United
2005–06	Lincoln City 0–1 Grimsby Town; Wycombe Wanderers 1–2 Cheltenham Town	Grimsby Town 2–1 Lincoln City; Cheltenham Town 0–0 Wycombe Wanderers	Grimsby Town 0–1 Cheltenham Town
2006–07	Bristol Rovers 2–1 Lincoln City; Shrewsbury Town 0–0 Milton Keynes Dons	Lincoln City 3–5 Bristol Rovers; Milton Keynes Dons 1–2 Shrewsbury Town	Bristol Rovers 3–1 Shrewsbury Town
2007–08	Darlington 2–1 Rochdale; Wycombe Wanderers 1–1 Stockport County	Rochdale 2–1 Darlington (a.e.t., Rochdale won 5–4 on penalties.); Stockport County 1–0 Wycombe Wanderers	Rochdale 2–3 Stockport County
2008–09	Shrewsbury Town 0–1 Bury; Rochdale 0–0 Gillingham	Bury 0–1 Shrewsbury Town (a.e.t., Shrewsbury won 4–3 on penalties.); Gillingham 2–1 Rochdale	Gillingham 1–0 Shrewsbury Town
2009–10	Dagenham & Redbridge 6–0 Morecambe; Aldershot Town 0–1 Rotherham United	Morecambe 2–1 Dagenham & Redbridge; Rotherham United 2–0 Aldershot Town	Dagenham & Redbridge 3–2 Rotherham United
2010–11	Torquay United 2–0 Shrewsbury Town; Stevenage 2–0 Accrington Stanley	Shrewsbury Town 0–0 Torquay United; Accrington Stanley 0–1 Stevenage	Stevenage 1–0 Torquay United
2011–12	Crewe Alexandra 1–0 Southend United; Cheltenham Town 2–0 Torquay United	Southend United 2–2 Crewe Alexandra; Torquay United 1–2 Cheltenham Town	Cheltenham Town 0–2 Crewe Alexandra
2012–13	Bradford City 2–3 Burton Albion; Northampton Town 1–0 Cheltenham Town	Burton Albion 1–3 Bradford City; Cheltenham Town 0–1 Northampton Town	Bradford City 3–0 Northampton Town
2013–14	Burton Albion 1–0 Southend United; York City 0–1 Fleetwood Town	Southend United 2–2 Burton Albion; Fleetwood Town 0–0 York City	Burton Albion 0–1 Fleetwood Town
2014–15	Stevenage 1–1 Southend United; Plymouth Argyle 2–3 Wycombe Wanderers	Southend United 3–1 Stevenage (a.e.t.); Wycombe Wanderers 2–1 Plymouth Argyle	Southend United 1–1 Wycombe Wanderers (a.e.t., Southend won 7–6 on penalties.)
2015–16	Portsmouth 2–2 Plymouth Argyle; AFC Wimbledon 1–0 Accrington Stanley	Plymouth Argyle 1–0 Portsmouth; Accrington Stanley 2–2 AFC Wimbledon (a.e.t.)	AFC Wimbledon 2–0 Plymouth Argyle
2016–17	Blackpool 3–2 Luton Town; Carlisle United 3–3 Exeter City	Luton Town 3–3 Blackpool; Exeter City 3–2 Carlisle United	Blackpool 2–1 Exeter City
2017–18	Lincoln City 0–0 Exeter City; Coventry City 1–1 Notts County	Exeter City 3–1 Lincoln City; Notts County 1–4 Coventry City	Coventry City 3–1 Exeter City
2018–19	Newport County 1–1 Mansfield Town; Tranmere Rovers 1–0 Forest Green Rovers	Mansfield Town 0–0 Newport County (a.e.t., Newport won 5–3 on penalties.); Forest Green Rovers 1–1 Tranmere Rovers	Newport County 0–1 Tranmere Rovers (a.e.t.)
2019–20	Colchester United 1–0 Exeter City; Northampton Town 0–2 Cheltenham Town	Exeter City 3–1 Colchester United; Cheltenham Town 0–3 Northampton Town	Exeter City 0–4 Northampton Town
2020–21	Newport County 2–0 Forest Green Rovers; Tranmere Rovers 1–2 Morecambe	Forest Green Rovers 4–3 Newport County (a.e.t.); Morecambe 1–1 Tranmere Rovers	Morecambe 1–0 Newport County
2021–22	Mansfield Town 2–1 Northampton Town; Swindon Town 2–1 Port Vale	Northampton Town 0–1 Mansfield Town; Port Vale 1–1 Swindon Town (a.e.t., Port Vale won 6–5 on penalties.)	Mansfield Town 0–3 Port Vale
2022–23	Salford City 1–0 Stockport County; Bradford City 1–0 Carlisle United	Stockport County 2–1 Salford City (a.e.t., Stockport County won 3–1 on penalties.); Carlisle United 3–1 (a.e.t.) Bradford City	Stockport County 1–1 Carlisle United (a.e.t., Carlisle won 5–4 on penalties.)
2023–24	Crawley Town 3–0 Milton Keynes Dons; Crewe Alexandra 0–2 Doncaster Rovers	Milton Keynes Dons 1–5 Crawley Town; Doncaster Rovers 0–2 Crewe Alexandra (a.e.t., Crewe Alexandra won 4–3 on penalties.	Crawley Town 2–0 Crewe Alexandra
2024–25	Notts County 0–1 AFC Wimbledon; Chesterfield 0–2 Walsall	AFC Wimbledon 1–0 Notts County; Walsall 2–1 Chesterfield	AFC Wimbledon 1–0 Walsall
2025–26	Grimsby Town 1–2 Salford City; Chesterfield 0–1 Notts County	Salford City 2–2 Grimsby Town; Notts County 0–0 Chesterfield	Notts County 3–0 Salford City

== Relegated teams ==
Season	Clubs
2004–05	Kidderminster Harriers, Cambridge United
2005–06	Oxford United, Rushden & Diamonds
2006–07	Boston United, Torquay United
2007–08	Mansfield Town, Wrexham
2008–09	Chester City, Luton Town
2009–10	Darlington, Grimsby Town
2010–11	Lincoln City, Stockport County
2011–12	Macclesfield Town, Hereford United
2012–13	Aldershot Town, Barnet
2013–14	Bristol Rovers, Torquay United
2014–15	Cheltenham Town, Tranmere Rovers
2015–16	York City, Dagenham & Redbridge
2016–17	Hartlepool United, Leyton Orient
2017–18	Barnet, Chesterfield
2018–19	Notts County, Yeovil Town, Bury
2019–20	Macclesfield Town (Note: As a result of Bury's expulsion from League One, only one team was relegated to maintain League Two at 24 teams.), Bury
2020–21	Southend United, Grimsby Town
2021–22	Oldham Athletic, Scunthorpe United
2022–23	Hartlepool United, Rochdale
2023–24	Sutton United, Forest Green Rovers
2024–25	Carlisle United, Morecambe
2025–26	Harrogate Town, Barrow

== Top scorers ==
Season	Top scorer(s)	Club(s)	Goals
2004–05	(England) Phil Jevons	Yeovil Town	27
2005–06	(England) Karl Hawley	Carlisle United	22
2006–07	(England) Richie Barker	Hartlepool United	21
2006–07	(England) Izale McLeod	Milton Keynes Dons	21
2007–08	(England) Aaron McLean	Peterborough United	29
2008–09	(England) Grant Holt	Shrewsbury Town	20
2008–09	(England) Jack Lester	Chesterfield	20
2009–10	(England) Lee Hughes	Notts County	30
2010–11	(Jamaica) Clayton Donaldson	Crewe Alexandra	28
2011–12	(England) Adebayo Akinfenwa	Northampton Town	18
2011–12	(England) Jack Midson	AFC Wimbledon	18
2011–12	(England) Izale McLeod	Barnet	18
2011–12	(England) Lewis Grabban	Rotherham United	18
2012–13	(England) Tom Pope	Port Vale	31
2013–14	(England) Sam Winnall	Scunthorpe United	23
2014–15	(England) Matt Tubbs	Portsmouth	21
2015–16	(England) Matty Taylor	Bristol Rovers	27
2016–17	(England) John Akinde	Barnet	26
2016–17	(England) John Marquis	Doncaster Rovers	26
2017–18	(Northern Ireland) Billy Kee	Accrington Stanley	25
2018–19	(England) James Norwood	Tranmere Rovers	29
2019–20	(Republic of Ireland) Eoin Doyle	Bradford City, Swindon Town	25
2020–21	(England) Paul Mullin	Cambridge United	32
2021–22	(England) Dom Telford	Newport County	25
2022–23	(England) Andy Cook	Bradford City	28
2023–24	(England) Macaulay Langstaff	Notts County	28
2024–25	(England) Michael Cheek	Bromley	25
2025–26	(Republic of Ireland) Aaron Drinan	Swindon Town	22

== Attendances ==
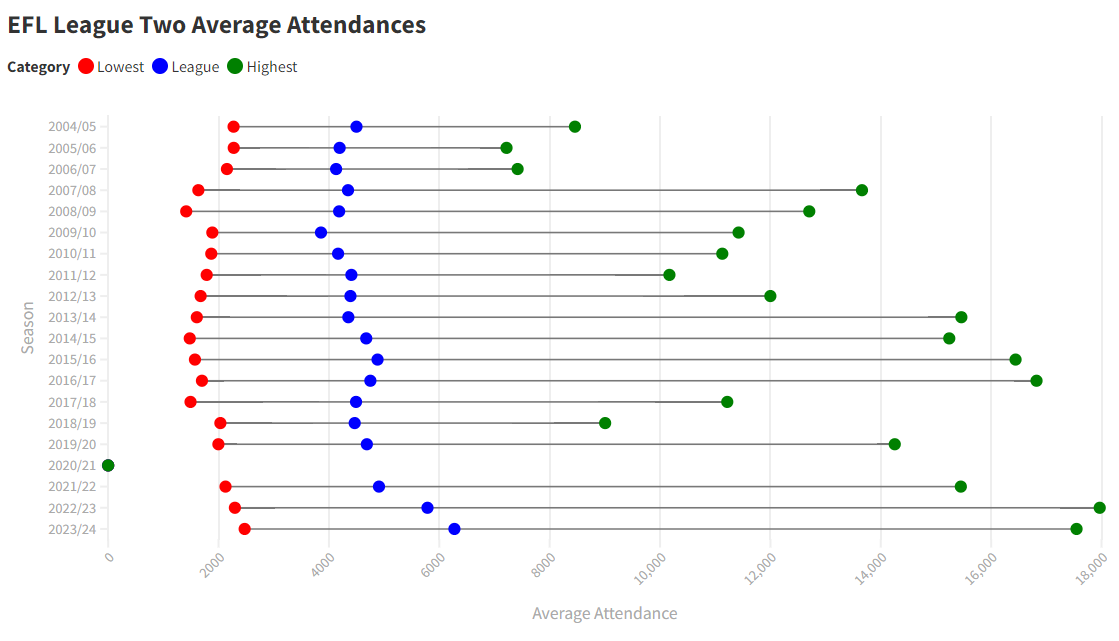

As of June 2023, League Two is the most watched fourth-tier domestic sports league in the world, and the 14th most watched football league in Europe of any tier. The total number of spectators who watched a League Two game in the 2023–24 season was 3,458,968.

Since the restructuring into League Two in 2004, the average attendance across all seasons is 4,602. The highest average attendance was 6,274 in the 2023–24 season. The highest average attendance for an individual club was achieved in the 2022–23; 17,967 for Bradford City. The lowest average attendance was 3,856 in the 2009–10 season.

Season	League average attendance	Highest average	
Season	League average attendance	Club	Attendance
2004–05	4,499	Swansea City	8,458
2005–06	4,194	Carlisle United	7,218
2006–07	4,130	Swindon Town	7,419
2007–08	4,346	Bradford City	13,659
2008–09	4,185	Bradford City	12,704
2009–10	3,856	Bradford City	11,423
2010–11	4,166	Bradford City	11,128
2011–12	4,407	Bradford City	10,170
2012–13	4,390	Bradford City	11,999
2013–14	4,352	Portsmouth	15,460
2014–15	4,676	Portsmouth	15,241
2015–16	4,881	Portsmouth	16,442
2016–17	4,751	Portsmouth	16,822
2017–18	4,491	Coventry City	11,218
2018–19	4,467	Lincoln City	9,005
2019–20	4,687	Bradford City	14,253
2020–21	No attendances due to COVID-19 pandemic		
2021–22	4,907	Bradford City	15,450
2022–23	5,786	Bradford City	17,967
2023–24	6,274	Bradford City	17,547
2024–25	6,221	Bradford City	17,762
2025–26	5,523	Notts County	10,432

== Historic performance ==
Since the restructuring into League Two in 2004, 69 teams have spent at least one season in the division, including 3 of the 20 teams in the 2026–27 Premier League.

Accrington Stanley, Cheltenham Town, Grimsby Town and Morecambe have spent the longest in League Two; 16 seasons in total. Morecambe and Newport County have the joint-longest tenure, with 14 consecutive seasons.

Northampton Town and Bristol Rovers have each been promoted four times from League Two. There have been 20 different champions, with Swindon Town and Chesterfield champions on two occasions. 23 teams have been both promoted and relegated from League Two.

Key

- † Teams with this background and symbol in the "Club" column will be competing in the 2026–27 EFL League Two
- ‡ Team will be competing in the 2026–27 Premier League
- The club competed in League Two during that season (the number is the club's final league position)

Club	Total Seasons	Number of Spells	Longest Spell (Seasons)	Highest Position	Lowest Position	Season																																											
Club	Total Seasons	Number of Spells	Longest Spell (Seasons)	Highest Position	Lowest Position	2004–05	2005–06	2006–07	2007–08	2008–09	2009–10	2010–11	2011–12	2012–13	2013–14	2014–15	2015–16	2016–17	2017–18	2018–19	2019–20	2020–21	2021–22	2022–23	2023–24	2024–25	2025–26	2026–27																					
Club	Total Seasons	Number of Spells	Longest Spell (Seasons)	Highest Position	Lowest Position	2004–05	2005–06	2006–07	2007–08	2008–09	2009–10	2010–11	2011–12	2012–13	2013–14	2014–15	2015–16	2016–17	2017–18	2018–19	2019–20	2020–21	2021–22	2022–23	2023–24	2024–25	2025–26	2026–27	Accrington Stanley †	16	2	12	1	21	20	17	16	15	5	14	18	15	17	4	13	1	17	21	16
AFC Bournemouth ‡	2	1	2	2	21					21	2																																						
AFC Wimbledon	8	2	5	5	21								16	20	20	15	7							21	10	5																							
Aldershot Town	5	1	5	6	24					15	6	14	11	24																																			
Barnet †	13	3	8	8	23		18	14	12	17	21	22	22	23			15	15	23								8																						
Barrow	6	1	6	8	24																	21	22	9	8	16	24																						
Blackpool	1	1	1	7	7													7																															
Bolton Wanderers	1	1	1	3	3																	3																											
Boston United	3	1	3	11	23	16	11	23																																									
Bradford City	12	2	6	3	18				10	9	14	18	18	7							9	15	14	6	9	3																							
Brentford ‡	2	1	2	1	14				14	1																																							
Bristol Rovers †	10	5	3	3	23	12	12	6					13	14	23		3						3				14																						
Bromley	2	1	2	1	11																					11	1																						
Burton Albion	6	1	6	1	19						13	19	17	4	6	1																																	
Bury	10	3	7	2	21	17	19	21	13	4	9	2			12	3				2																													
Cambridge United	9	3	7	2	24	24										19	9	11	12	21	16	2					3																						
Carlisle United	11	3	9	1	23		1									21	10	6	10	11	18	10	20	5		23																							
Cheltenham Town †	16	4	6	1	23	14	5				22	17	6	5	17	23		21	17	16	4	1				15	18																						
Chester City	5	1	5	15	23	20	15	18	22	23																																							
Chesterfield †	10	4	4	1	24				8	10	8	1		8	1				24							7	6																						
Colchester United †	11	1	11	6	22													8	13	8	6	20	15	20	22	10	12																						
Coventry City ‡	1	1	1	6	6														6																														
Crawley Town †	12	3	9	3	22								3				20	19	14	19	13	12	12	22	7		22																						
Crewe Alexandra †	12	3	5	2	18						18	10	7					17	15	12	2			13	6	13	11																						
Dagenham & Redbridge	8	2	5	7	23				20	8	7		19	22	9	14	23																																
Darlington	6	1	6	6	24	8	8	11	6	12	24																																						
Doncaster Rovers	4	2	3	1	18													3						18	5	1																							
Exeter City †	12	3	10	2	16					2				10	16	10	14	5	4	9	5	9	2																										
Fleetwood Town †	5	2	3	4	15									13	4											14	15																						
Forest Green Rovers	6	2	5	1	24														21	5	10	6	1		24																								
Gillingham †	9	3	5	1	17					5		8	8	1										17	12	17	17																						
Grimsby Town †	16	3	6	4	24	18	4	15	16	22	23							14	18	17	15	24		11	21	9	7																						
Harrogate Town	6	1	6	13	23																	17	19	19	13	18	23																						
Hartlepool United	7	3	4	2	23			2							19	22	16	23					17	23																									
Hereford United	5	2	3	3	23			16	3		16	21	23																																				
Kidderminster Harriers	1	1	1	23	23	23																																											
Leyton Orient	8	3	4	1	24	11	3										8	24			17	11	13	1																									
Lincoln City	9	2	7	1	23	6	7	5	15	13	20	23							7	1																													
Luton Town	5	2	4	2	24					24						8	11	4	2																														
Macclesfield Town	10	2	8	5	24	5	17	22	19	20	19	15	24							22	24																												
Mansfield Town	15	2	11	3	23	13	16	17	23						11	21	12	12	8	4	21	16	7	8	3																								
Milton Keynes Dons	6	3	3	1	19			4	1											3					4	19	2																						
Morecambe	16	2	14	4	24				11	11	4	20	15	16	18	11	21	18	22	18	22	4			15	24																							
Newport County †	14	1	14	5	22										14	9	22	22	11	7	14	5	11	15	18	22	20																						
Northampton Town †	13	5	7	1	21	7	2				11	16	20	6	21	12	1			15	7		4	3																									
Notts County	13	3	6	1	23	19	21	13	21	19	1						17	16	5	23					14	6	5																						
Oldham Athletic †	6	2	4	10	23															14	19	18	23				10																						
Oxford United	8	2	6	2	23	15	23					12	9	9	8	13	2																																
Peterborough United	3	1	3	2	10		9	10	2																																								
Plymouth Argyle	7	2	6	2	21								21	21	10	7	5	2			3																												
Port Vale †	12	4	5	2	20					18	10	11	12	3					20	20	8	13	5			2																							
Portsmouth	4	1	4	1	16										13	16	6	1																															
Rochdale †	11	4	6	3	24	9	14	9	5	6	3			12	3								18	24																									
Rotherham United †	7	2	6	2	14				9	14	5	9	10	2																																			
Rushden & Diamonds	2	1	2	22	24	22	24																																										
Salford City †	8	1	8	4	20																11	8	10	7	20	8	4																						
Scunthorpe United	5	3	3	2	24	2									2						20	22	24																										
Shrewsbury Town †	11	3	8	2	21	21	10	7	18	7	12	4	2			2											19																						
Southend United	7	3	5	4	23	4						13	4	11	5	5						23																											
Stevenage	10	2	9	2	23							6				6	18	10	16	10	23	14	21	2																									
Stockport County	6	3	3	1	24		22	8	4			24												4	1																								
Sutton United	3	1	3	8	23																		8	14	23																								
Swansea City	1	1	1	3	3	3																																											
Swindon Town †	11	4	6	1	19			3					1						9	13	1		6	10	19	12	9																						
Torquay United	7	2	5	5	24		20	24			17	7	5	19	24																																		
Tranmere Rovers †	9	3	7	6	24											24				6		7	9	12	16	20	21																						
Walsall †	9	2	8	1	19			1													12	19	16	16	11	4	13																						
Wrexham	4	2	3	2	24		13	19	24																2																								
Wycombe Wanderers	12	3	6	3	22	10	6	12	7	3		3		15	22	4	13	9	3																														
Yeovil Town	5	2	4	1	24	1											19	20	19	24																													
York City †	5	2	4	7	24									17	7	18	24																																

== See also ==
- Football League Fourth Division (1958–59 – 1991–92)
- Football League Third Division (1992–93 – 2003–04)
- List of professional sports teams in the United Kingdom
