= Player of the month =

Player of the month may refer to:

In English football:

- Premier League Player of the Month
- EFL Championship Player of the Month
- EFL League One Player of the Month
- EFL League Two Player of the Month
- Football League First Division Player of the Month
- Football League Second Division Player of the Month
- Football League Third Division Player of the Month

In Dutch football:

- Eredivisie Player of the Month

In French football:

- UNFP Player of the Month

In Spanish football:

- La Liga Player of the Month
- Liga F Player of the Month

In Italian football:

- Serie A Player of the Month

In Malaysia football

- PFAM Player of the Month

In other sports:

- ACB Player of the Month Award
- Major League Baseball Player of the Month Award
- NBA Player of the Month and Week
