= Luke Hannant =

English footballer (born 1993)

Personal information
- Full name: Luke James Hannant
- Date of birth: 4 November 1993 (age 33)
- Place of birth: Great Yarmouth, England
- Height: 5 ft 11 in (1.80 m)
- Position: Midfielder

Team information
- Current team: Rochdale
- Number: 19

Youth career
- 2003–2008: Norwich City
- 2010–2012: Cambridge United

Senior career*
Years	Team	Apps	(Gls)
2012–2014	Dereham Town		
2014–2016	Team Northumbria		
2016–2018	Gateshead	37	(4)
2016	→ South Shields (dual registration)	4	(1)
2018–2019	Port Vale	63	(4)
2019–2021	Cambridge United	70	(5)
2021–2023	Colchester United	61	(2)
2023	→ Dundee (loan)	14	(1)
2023–2025	Gateshead	88	(24)
2025–2026	Oldham Athletic	25	(1)
2026–	Rochdale	12	(3)
- * Club domestic league appearances and goals as of 17:00, 5 September 2026 (UTC)

Luke James Hannant (born 4 November 1993) is an English professional footballer who plays as a midfielder for EFL League Two club Rochdale.

Hannant spent his youth with Norwich City and Cambridge United before embarking on a degree at Northumbria University. During his time as a student, he played non-League football for Dereham Town and Team Northumbria. He helped Dereham win the Eastern Counties League Premier Division championship in 2012–13. He joined Gateshead in 2016, and after returning from a dual registration spell at South Shields, managed to establish himself in the first team. Port Vale signed him in January 2018 before he made a return to Cambridge United in May 2019 and helped the club to win promotion out of League Two at the end of the 2020–21 season. However, he remained in League Two as he left Cambridge to join Colchester United. He joined Scottish club Dundee on loan in January 2023. He rejoined Gateshead in August 2023 and helped the club to the FA Trophy title in 2024. He was the club's Player of the Year for the 2024–25 season. He left Gateshead for Oldham Athletic in June 2025, then moved on to Rochdale in March 2026. He was promoted out of the National League with Rochdale via the play-offs in 2026.

== Career ==
=== Early career ===
Hannant spent his youth at the Academy at Norwich City before being released at the age of 14. At that point, he joined the Cambridge United youth team. Released by Cambridge at 18, he took up a football scholarship at Northumbria University. He would graduate with a 2:1 Sport & Exercise Science degree in 2016. During this time he also played in the Eastern Counties League and Isthmian League for Dereham Town and in the Northern League for Team Northumbria. He was an important part of the "Magpies" side that finished the 2012–13 season as champions of the Eastern Counties League Premier Division.

=== Gateshead ===
He spent the summer of 2016 on trial at Gateshead before agreeing to join the club on non-contract terms. He went on to join Northern League Division One club South Shields on a dual registration deal. He scored on his debut for the "Mariners" in a 5–0 home win over Jarrow Roofing Boldon Community Association on 27 September. He played a total of four games for South Shields. He made his National League debut for the "Tynesiders" on 22 October, in a 2–0 win at Maidstone United. He scored his first goal for the "Heed" on New Year's Eve, in a 4–1 victory over Barrow at the Gateshead International Stadium, where he was also named as man of the match. He was signed to a contract at Gateshead in March 2017, which would keep him tied to the club in summer 2018. He ended the 2016–17 season with two goals in 21 appearances, and scored three goals in 23 games in the first half of the 2017–18 campaign. Speaking in January 2018, manager Steve Watson said that "Hannant has been one of our best players this season".

=== Port Vale ===
On 18 January 2018, Hannant signed an 18-month contract with EFL League Two side Port Vale after being signed for an undisclosed fee – reported to be a low five-figure sum – by Neil Aspin, his former manager at Gateshead. Despite being a newcomer to the English Football League, he was described as "a rare positive for the Valiants in a difficult start to 2018", and credited his good start to his career to the support of fellow midfielders Michael Tonge, Antony Kay and Danny Pugh. On 17 March, he scored his first goal in the Football League with curling effort from outside the box in a 2–2 draw with Stevenage at Vale Park; he went on to say that "I was a bit speechless when it went in".

He began the 2018–19 season in good form on the left-side of midfield, scoring two goals in the opening five games, including a brilliant curling free kick away at Carlisle United. This led to reports that he was being monitored by EFL Championship club Bolton Wanderers. However, despite making 50 appearances during the campaign, manager John Askey confirmed that he would not be offering Hannant a new contract on 16 May.

=== Cambridge United ===
On 28 May 2019, Hannant returned to Cambridge United to sign a two-year deal with an option for another year. Manager Colin Calderwood said that "Luke has good experience in senior football and caught my eye against us at the Abbey". He picked up an ankle injury in February 2020 and was sidelined for six weeks. However, the COVID-19 pandemic in England meant that he had to wait until August to complete a full day's training with the club.

He enjoyed a strong first half to the 2020–21 season, playing on both wings and either side of a midfield diamond, providing eight assists and scoring five goals by February. Cambridge went on to secure promotion at the end of the season, with Hannant scoring seven goals from 48 appearances.

=== Colchester United ===
Hannant left Cambridge after failing to reach an agreement on a new contract and chose to remain in League Two, joining Colchester United on a two-year deal on 10 June 2021. Hannant stated that "I'm 27 now and I needed to go somewhere where I know I'm going to play a lot of minutes". He made his debut at the Colchester Community Stadium on 14 August 2021, coming on as a substitute in Colchester's 1–0 defeat to Northampton Town. He was a regular first-team player under Hayden Mullins, before being sidelined by interim head coach Wayne Brown. He made 27 starts and 16 substitute appearances in the 2021–22 season, picking up two assists and five yellow cards. He featured in 29 matches during the first half of the 2022–23 campaign, scoring three goals. Hannant was released at the end of the season.

==== Dundee (loan) ====
On 31 January 2023, Hannant joined Scottish Championship club Dundee on loan until the end of the 2022–23 season. He joined Colchester teammate Ryan Clampin, who was already on loan at Dundee. Hannant made his debut as a substitute on 12 February in a 3–0 league victory over Cove Rangers. Hannant scored his first goal for the Dark Blues on 15 April in a 3–3 draw at home to Greenock Morton. He would complete a successful loan spell by starting in Dundee's win over Queen's Park which would clinch the Scottish Championship title for the Dee.

=== Return to Gateshead ===
On 2 August 2023, Hannant rejoined Gateshead on a two-year deal. He scored 1 goals in 50 games during the 2023–24 season, including a brace in a 2–1 win over champions Chesterfield that secured Gateshead a place in the play-offs. However, due to a stadium issue, Gateshead were not permitted to take part in the play-offs. Hannant and Gateshead ended the season on a high, however, as the team beat Solihull Moors in the FA Trophy final.

On 14 December 2024, Hannant scored two goals from the penalty spot in a 4–0 home win over Woking and would have claimed a hat-trick if he had not missed a third penalty kick. He was named as the Supporters' January Player of the Month after having scored two goals in four games. He was named Player's Player of the Season and Supporters' Player of the Season for the 2024–25 campaign, also winning Goal of the Season for his strike against Sutton United, and the Golden Boot award. He left the club after choosing to return to the EFL.

=== Oldham Athletic ===
On 27 June 2025, Hannant agreed a two-year deal with newly promoted League Two club Oldham Athletic. Manager Micky Mellon said that he was a player that the club had "admired for a long time" for his versatility and technique. On 26 August, Hannant scored his first goal for the Latics in an EFL Trophy group stage game against Manchester City U21. He scored once in 25 league games for the Latics.

=== Rochdale ===
On 21 March 2026, Hannant returned to the National League, joining leaders Rochdale on a deal until the end of the 2026–27 season. He said that the philosophy of manager Jimmy McNulty appealed to him. On 10 May, Rochdale defeated Boreham Wood on penalties in the play-off final to secure promotion back into the EFL.

== Style of play ==
Hannant is a versatile two-footed attacking midfielder who can play in central midfield or as a winger. Port Vale teammate Tom Pope described him as a player with "good energy, is positive, doesn't mind a tackle, is decent in the air and can play as well".

== Career statistics ==
As of match played 5 September 2026

Appearances and goals by club, season and competition
Club	Season	League			FA Cup		EFL Cup		Other		Total	
Club	Season	Division	Apps	Goals	Apps	Goals	Apps	Goals	Apps	Goals	Apps	Goals
Dereham Town	2013–14	Isthmian League; Division One North	7	0	0	0	—		0	0	7	0
Gateshead	2016–17	National League	18	2	1	0	—		2 (Note: Appearance(s) in the FA Trophy.)	0	21	2
Gateshead	2017–18	National League	19	2	3	0	—		2	1	24	3
Gateshead	Total		37	4	4	0	—		4	1	45	5
South Shields (dual registration)	2016–17	Northern League; Division One	4	1	0	0	—		0	0	4	1
Port Vale	2017–18	League Two	18	1	0	0	0	0	0	0	18	1
Port Vale	2018–19	League Two	45	3	1	0	1	0	3 (Note: Appearance(s) in the EFL Trophy.)	1	50	4
Port Vale	Total		63	4	1	0	1	0	3	1	68	5
Cambridge United	2019–20	League Two	27	1	0	0	2	0	0	0	29	1
Cambridge United	2020–21	League Two	43	4	1	0	1	0	3	3	48	7
Cambridge United	Total		70	5	1	0	3	0	3	3	77	8
Colchester United	2021–22	League Two	37	0	1	0	0	0	5	0	43	0
Colchester United	2022–23	League Two	24	2	1	0	1	1	3	0	29	3
Colchester United	Total		61	2	2	0	1	1	8	0	72	3
Dundee (loan)	2022–23	Scottish Championship	14	1	—		—		0	0	14	1
Gateshead	2023–24	National League	44	9	2	2	—		5	0	51	11
Gateshead	2024–25	National League	44	15	2	0	—		1	0	47	15
Gateshead	Total		88	24	4	2	0	0	6	0	98	26
Oldham Athletic	2025–26	League Two	25	1	2	1	1	0	2	2	30	4
Rochdale	2025–26	National League	8	2	—		—		2 (Note: Appearance(s) in the play-offs.)	0	10	2
Rochdale	2026–27	League Two	4	1	0	0	2	0	0	0	6	1
Rochdale	Total		12	3	0	0	2	0	2	0	16	3
Career total			381	45	14	3	8	1	28	7	431	56

== Honours ==
Dereham Town

- Eastern Counties Football League Premier Division: 2012–13

Cambridge United

- EFL League Two second-place promotion: 2020–21

Dundee

- Scottish Championship: 2022–23

Gateshead

- FA Trophy: 2023–24

Rochdale

- National League play-offs: 2026

Individual

- Gateshead Player of the Year: 2024–25
