= Harvey Knibbs =

English footballer (born 1999)

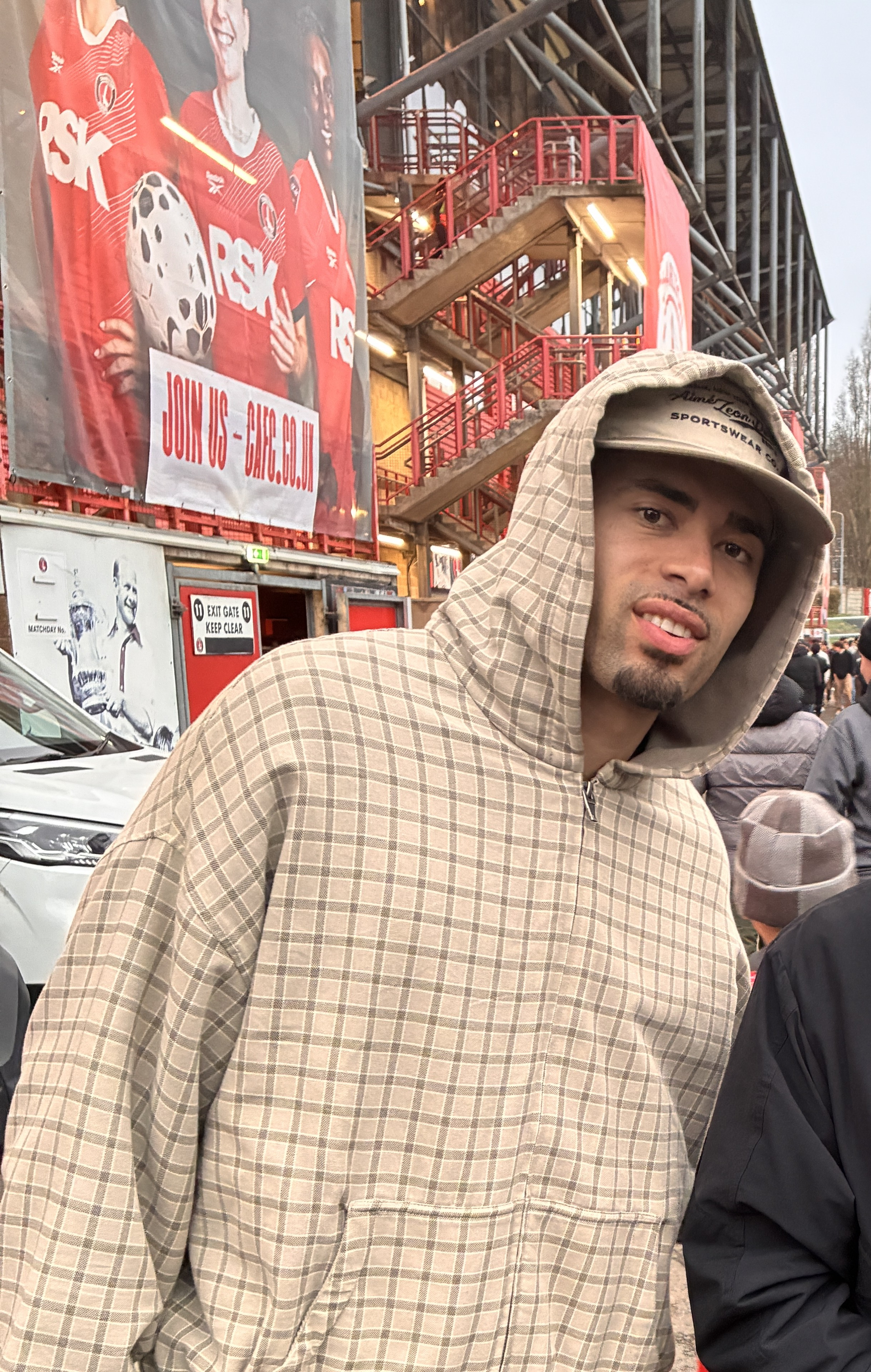
- Knibbs with Charlton Athletic in 2026

Personal information
- Full name: Harvey Andrew Knibbs
- Date of birth: 26 April 1999 (age 27)
- Place of birth: Bristol, England
- Height: 1.74 m (5 ft 9 in)
- Positions: Attacking midfielder; left winger; forward

Team information
- Current team: Charlton Athletic
- Number: 8

Youth career
- –2015: Nottingham Forest
- 2015–2019: Aston Villa

Senior career*
Years	Team	Apps	(Gls)
2019–2023	Cambridge United	121	(18)
2023–2025	Reading	88	(25)
2025–	Charlton Athletic	33	(3)
- * Club domestic league appearances and goals as of 17:10, 7 November 2026 (UTC)

Harvey Andrew Knibbs (born 26 April 1999) is an English professional footballer who plays as an attacking midfielder, left winger or forward for EFL Championship club Charlton Athletic.

Knibbs went through the academies of Nottingham Forest and Aston Villa, before starting his senior career with Cambridge United in 2019. He finished as top scorer in his debut season with Cambridge after scoring nine goals in 31 games. He left Cambridge in 2023 following the expiry of his contract. He joined Reading later that year and quickly established himself into the team, making 53 appearances and scoring 16 times in his first season with them.

== Club career ==
=== Early career ===
Knibbs was raised in Derbyshire and joined the Nottingham Forest academy at age nine. He was released at age 14 before moving to the Aston Villa Academy. He signed his first professional contract at the end of the 2016–17 season. He was released from Aston Villa in 2019 after spending seven years in their youth system.

=== Cambridge United ===
In June 2019 Knibbs signed a two-year contract with Cambridge United. He sustained a heel injury shortly after signing, forcing him to miss most of pre-season. On 13 August, he made his debut for Cambridge in an EFL Cup match against Championship side Brentford. He scored the winning penalty as Cambridge beat Brentford 5–4 in the shootout. He made his league debut on 17 August in a 2–1 win over Colchester United. On his first professional start on 20 August, he scored his first senior goal in a 3–2 win over Scunthorpe United. He suffered a hamstring injury on 22 February 2020, in a 0–0 draw to Plymouth Argyle, which caused him to miss the rest of the season. He finished his debut season with Cambridge as the top scorer, scoring nine goals in 31 games.

Knibbs played in Cambridge's season opener on 12 September 2020, in a 3–0 win over Carlisle United. He extended his contract in October by two years, keeping him at the club until 2023. He scored his first league goal of the season on 16 January 2021 in a 1–1 draw to Colchester. Knibbs struggled that season, due to the sacking of Colin Calderwood and the arrivals of Paul Mullin and Joe Ironside. He finished the season with 31 appearances and 3 goals in all competitions. Knibbs scored his first goal of the 2021–22 season on 31 August 2021 in a 4–1 win over Oxford United in the EFL Trophy. He once again struggled for gametime, but manager Mark Bonner praised him for his conduct. His first league goal of the season came on 18 January 2022 in a 3–1 win over Doncaster Rovers. He finished the season with 9 goals in 47 appearances. On 30 July 2022, Knibbs scored the winner in the 2022–23 season opener against MK Dons, securing a 1–0 victory. He won Cambridge Player of the Month for September for three goal contributions. Cambridge rejected an offer for Knibbs from Plymouth in January 2023. He left the club following the expiry of his contract in June. In total, he made 156 appearances and scored 26 times for Cambridge.

=== Reading ===
==== 2023–24 season ====
On 13 July 2023, Knibbs signed a three-year contract with Reading, their first signing following the lift of their transfer embargo. He made his Reading debut in a 1–0 defeat to Peterborough United on 5 August. His first goal came on 26 August in a 2–1 defeat to Exeter City. On 10 October, he scored the first professional hat-trick of his career in an EFL Trophy match against M4 rivals Swindon Town that finished in a 5–0 win. He finished his debut Reading season with 53 appearances and 16 goals in all competitions, establishing himself in the first-team.

==== 2024–25 season ====
Knibbs started the season opener on 10 August 2024, a 1–1 draw against Birmingham City. Later that month, manager Rubén Sellés revealed that Knibbs had suffered a groin injury in training, and would be out for three to four weeks. He made his return on 14 September in a 1–0 defeat to Leyton Orient, coming on as a substitute for Charlie Savage. He scored his first goal of the season on 28 September, scoring the equaliser in a 2–1 win over Huddersfield Town. Despite playing through a "painful" MCL injury, he scored three goals in three games in November and was subsequently nominated for EFL League One Player of the Month.

Reading continued to push for a position in the play-offs, and Knibbs was an important member of the team, scoring three goals in five games (in wins over Wrexham, Peterborough, and Wycombe). In the process, he also became the first Reading player since Dave Kitson in the 2005–06 season to score 15 or more goals in all competitions in back-to-back seasons.

=== Charlton Athletic ===
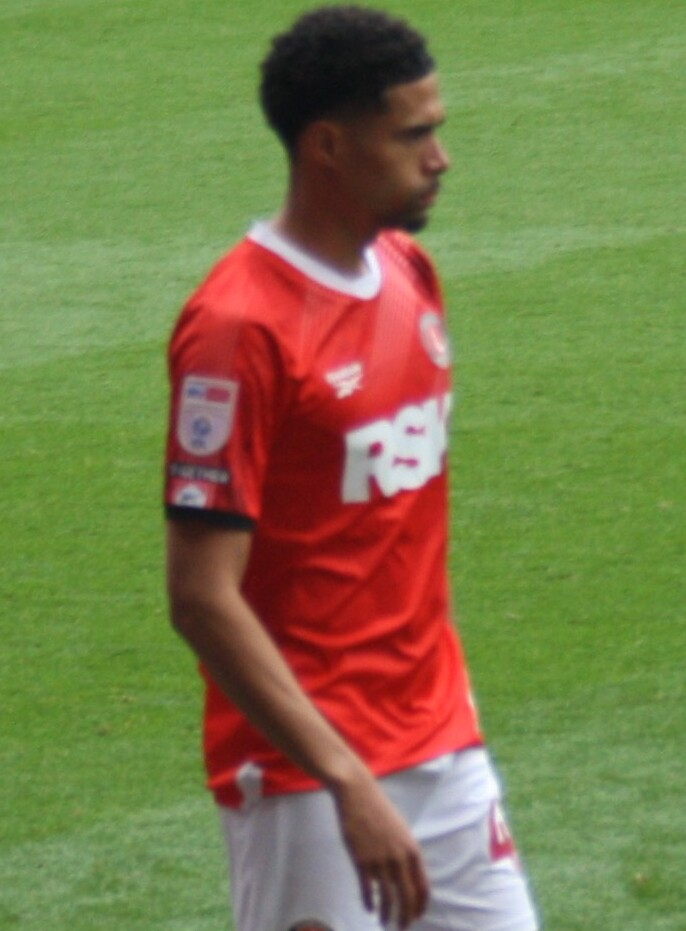
Knibbs with Charlton Athletic in 2025 at The Valley.

On 1 August 2025, Knibbs signed a four-year deal at Championship club Charlton Athletic for an undisclosed fee. He made his debut for the club in the first match of the season on 9 August 2025, coming on as a substitute in the 80th minute and scoring the winning goal during stoppage time for a 1–0 win over Watford at The Valley. Knibbs was stretchered off the pitch during Charlton's 1–0 home win over Sheffield United on 17 January 2026, after a late challenge by Djibril Soumaré which resulted in a straight red card. The injury saw Knibbs miss most of the rest of the season.

== Personal life ==
Knibbs is of Jamaican descent through his paternal grandparents. His twin brother is international athlete Alex Knibbs, who won a bronze medal in the 4 × 400 m relay at the IAAF U20 World Championships. Knibbs' dad, Ralph Knibbs is a former elite rugby union player for Bristol.

== Career statistics ==
As of match played 7 November 2026

Appearances and goals by club, season and competition
Club	Season	League			FA Cup		League Cup		Other		Total	
Club	Season	Division	Apps	Goals	Apps	Goals	Apps	Goals	Apps	Goals	Apps	Goals
Cambridge United	2019–20	League Two	24	7	2	0	2	0	3 (Note: Appearances in the EFL Trophy)	2	31	9
Cambridge United	2020–21	League Two	23	2	1	0	2	0	5	1	31	3
Cambridge United	2021–22	League One	34	4	5	2	2	0	6	3	47	9
Cambridge United	2022–23	League One	40	5	3	0	1	0	3	0	47	5
Cambridge United	Total		121	18	11	2	7	0	17	6	156	26
Reading	2023–24	League One	45	11	2	1	2	0	4	4	53	16
Reading	2024–25	League One	43	14	2	0	1	0	1	2	47	16
Reading	Total		88	25	4	1	3	0	5	6	100	32
Charlton Athletic	2025–26	Championship	26	3	1	0	2	0	—		29	3
Charlton Athletic	2026–27	Championship	7	0	0	0	1	0	—		8	0
Charlton Athletic	Total		33	3	1	0	3	0	0	0	37	3
Career total			242	46	16	3	13	0	22	12	293	61
