= 2020–21 Cambridge United F.C. season =

Cambridge United
2020–21 season
- Owner: Paul Barry
- Head coach: Mark Bonner
- Stadium: Abbey Stadium
- League Two: 2nd (Promoted)
- FA Cup: First round
- EFL Cup: Second round
- EFL Trophy: Third round
- Top goalscorer: League: Paul Mullin (32); All: Paul Mullin (34)
Home colours	Away colours	Third colours

The 2020–21 season was Cambridge United's 109th season in their history, 42nd season in the Football League and seventh consecutive season in EFL League Two. Along with League Two, the club also participated in the FA Cup, EFL Cup and EFL Trophy.

The season covers the period from 1 July 2020 to 30 June 2021.

== Transfers ==
=== Transfers in ===
Date	Position	Name	From	Fee	Ref.
20 July 2020	CF	Paul Mullin (ENG)	Tranmere Rovers	Free transfer	
21 July 2020	DM	Paul Digby (ENG)	Stevenage	Free transfer	
28 July 2020	AM	Wes Hoolahan (IRL)	Newcastle Jets (AUS)	Free transfer	
1 August 2020	CF	Joe Ironside (ENG)	Macclesfield Town	Free transfer	
14 August 2020	LB	Jack Iredale (AUS)	Carlisle United	Free transfer	
1 September 2020	GK	Kai McKenzie-Lyle (GUY)	Liverpool	Free transfer	
4 September 2020	CM	Adam May (ENG)	Portsmouth	Free transfer	

=== Loans in ===
Date from	Position	Name	From	Date until	Ref.
7 August 2020	CB	Robbie Cundy (ENG)	Bristol City	January 2021	
22 September 2020	AM	Idris El Mizouni (TUN)	Ipswich Town	January 2021	
9 October 2020	DM	Hiram Boateng (ENG)	Milton Keynes Dons	End of season	
6 January 2021	RB	Jubril Okedina (ENG)	Tottenham Hotspur	End of season	
25 January 2021	RW	Shilow Tracey (ENG)	Tottenham Hotspur	End of season	
1 February 2021	CB	Aji Alese (ENG)	West Ham United	End of season	
1 February 2021	CB	Declan Drysdale (ENG)	Coventry City	End of season	

=== Loans out ===
Date from	Position	Name	To	Date until	Ref.
21 August 2020	GK	Louis Chadwick (ENG)	St Neots Town	Work experience	
21 August 2020	MF	Myles Cowling (ENG)	St Neots Town	Work experience	
23 October 2020	CM	Lewis Simper (ENG)	St Neots Town		
23 January 2021	CF	Andrew Dallas (SCO)	Weymouth	April 2021	

=== Transfers out ===
Date	Position	Name	To	Fee	Ref.
1 July 2020	CF	Sam Bennett (ENG)	Unattached	Released	
1 July 2020	CM	Samir Carruthers (IRL)	Unattached	Released	
1 July 2020	CF	Jabo Ibehre (ENG)	Unattached	Released	
1 July 2020	GK	Finley Iron (ENG)	Unattached	Released	
1 July 2020	LB	Daniel Jones (ENG)	Hereford	Released	
1 July 2020	RM	Reggie Lambe (BER)	Unattached	Released	
1 July 2020	CM	Paul Lewis (ENG)	Tranmere Rovers	Released	
1 July 2020	LB	Jordan Norville-Williams (ENG)	Unattached	Released	
1 July 2020	CB	George Taft (ENG)	Bolton Wanderers	Released	
28 July 2020	CM	George Maris (ENG)	Mansfield Town	Undisclosed	
1 December 2020	RW	Tom Knowles (ENG)	Yeovil Town	Undisclosed	
22 January 2021	CB	Harry Darling (ENG)	Milton Keynes Dons	Undisclosed	

== Competitions ==
=== League Two ===
==== League table ====
Pos	Team	Pld	W	D	L	GF	GA	GD	Pts	Promotion, qualification or relegation
1	Cheltenham Town (C, P)	46	24	10	12	61	39	+22	82	Promotion to the EFL League One
2	Cambridge United (P)	46	24	8	14	73	49	+24	80	Promotion to the EFL League One
3	Bolton Wanderers (P)	46	23	10	13	59	50	+9	79	Promotion to the EFL League One
4	Morecambe (O, P)	46	23	9	14	69	58	+11	78	Qualification for League Two play-offs
5	Newport County	46	20	13	13	57	42	+15	73	Qualification for League Two play-offs
6	Forest Green Rovers	46	20	13	13	59	51	+8	73	Qualification for League Two play-offs
7	Tranmere Rovers	46	20	13	13	55	50	+5	73	Qualification for League Two play-offs
8	Salford City	46	19	14	13	54	34	+20	71	

Updated to match(es) played on 31 May 2021. Source: EFL Official Website
Rules for classification: 1) Points; 2) Goal difference; 3) Number of goals scored; 4) Head-to-head results; 5) Wins; 6) Away goals; 7) Penalty points (sec 9.5); 8) 12-point sending off offences
(C) Champions; (O) Play-off winners; (P) Promoted

==== Results summary ====
Overall								Home						Away					
Pld	W	D	L	GF	GA	GD	Pts	W	D	L	GF	GA	GD	W	D	L	GF	GA	GD
46	24	8	14	73	49	+24	80	12	5	6	30	20	+10	12	3	8	43	29	+14

Last updated: 8 May 2021.
Source: BBC

==== Results by matchday ====
Matchday	1	2	3	4	5	6	7	8	9	10	11	12	13	14	15	16	17	18	19	20	21	22	23	24	25	26	27	28	29	30	31	32	33	34	35	36	37	38	39	40	41	42	43	44	45	46
Ground	H	A	H	A	H	A	H	H	A	A	H	H	A	H	H	A	H	A	H	A	A	H	A	A	H	H	A	A	H	A	H	A	H	H	A	A	H	A	H	A	H	A	A	H	A	H
Result	W	W	D	L	W	W	W	D	W	L	W	D	D	L	L	L	W	L	W	L	W	W	D	W	D	W	W	L	D	W	L	W	L	W	L	W	W	W	W	D	L	W	W	L	L	W
Position	2	1	1	4	2	1	1	2	2	2	2	2	3	6	6	9	6	9	8	8	5	3	3	1	1	1	1	1	1	1	1	1	2	2	2	2	2	1	1	1	2	1	1	2	2	2

Updated to match(es) played on 8 May 2021. Source: 11v11 for league tables and fixtures
A = Away; H = Home; W = Win; D = Draw; L = Loss

==== Matches ====
Win Draw Loss Postponed

The 2020–21 season fixtures were released on 21 August.

12 September 2020 1	Cambridge United	3–0	Carlisle United	Cambridge
15:00 BST	Hannant 9'; Mullin 16'; Digby (yellow card) 45+2'; Ironside 86'	Report	Patrick (yellow card) 45+2'; Guy (yellow card) 76'; Touré (yellow card) 88'; Mellish (yellow card) 89'	Stadium: Abbey Stadium; Attendance: 0 Referee: Paul Howard

19 September 2020 2	Morecambe	0–5	Cambridge United	Morecambe
15:00 BST	Diagouraga (yellow card) 58'; Mendes Gomes (yellow card) 60'	Report	Hoolahan 29'; Mullin 34', 54', 64'; May 37'	Stadium: Mazuma Stadium; Attendance: 0 Referee: Ben Speedie

26 September 2020 3	Cambridge United	0–0	Tranmere Rovers	Cambridge
15:00 BST	Cundy (yellow card) 53'; Ironside (yellow card) 67'; Knoyle (yellow card) 79'	Report		Stadium: Abbey Stadium; Attendance: 0 Referee: Sam Purkiss

3 October 2020 4	Exeter City	2–0	Cambridge United	Exeter
15:00 BST	Jay 16' (pen.); Randall 34'; Parkes (yellow card) 57'; Taylor (yellow card) 77'; McArdle (yellow card) 90+2'	Report	Digby (yellow card) 41'; Dunk (yellow card) 79'	Stadium: St James Park; Attendance: 0 Referee: Neil Hair

10 October 2020 5	Cambridge United	2–1	Newport County	Cambridge
15:00 BST	Mullin 38', 61' (yellow card) 76'; May (yellow card) 65'	Report	Bennett (yellow card) 25'; Twine 67'; Haynes (yellow card) 90'	Stadium: Abbey Stadium; Attendance: 0 Referee: Carl Brook

17 October 2020 6	Scunthorpe United	0–5	Cambridge United	Scunthorpe
15:00 BST	Hippolyte (yellow card) 47' (yellow-red card) 55'; Taylor (yellow card) 48'; Spence (yellow card) 53'	Report	Mullin 35' (pen.), 44' (pen.); Cordner 51' (o.g.); Ironside 61', 83' (yellow card) 77'	Stadium: Sands Venue Stadium; Attendance: 0 Referee: Chris Sarginson

20 October 2020 7	Cambridge United	3–1	Port Vale	Cambridge
19:00 BST	Mullin 3' (pen.), 51', 90+5'; May (yellow card) 84'	Report	Robinson 18' (pen.)	Stadium: Abbey Stadium; Attendance: 0 Referee: Trevor Kettle

24 October 2020 8	Cambridge United	1–1	Bolton Wanderers	Cambridge
15:00 BST	Crellin 73' (o.g.); Iredale (yellow card) 90+4'	Report	Delaney (yellow card) 64'; Sarcevic 82'	Stadium: Abbey Stadium; Attendance: 0 Referee: Lee Swabey

27 October 2020 9	Walsall	0–2	Cambridge United	Bescot
19:00 GMT	Kinsella (yellow card) 55'; McDonald (yellow card) 64'	Report	Mullin 9' (pen.); Boateng (yellow card) 23'; Ironside 80' (pen.)	Stadium: Banks's Stadium; Attendance: 0 Referee: Anthony Backhouse

31 October 2020 10	Crawley Town	2–1	Cambridge United	Crawley
15:00 GMT	Watters 44'; Nichols 56' (yellow card) 71'; Hesketh (red card) 87'	Report	Ironside 3'	Stadium: The People's Pension Stadium; Attendance: 0 Referee: James Bell

3 November 2020 11	Cambridge United	2–1	Salford City	Cambridge
19:00 GMT	Iredale 43'; Ironside 49' (pen.)	Report	Henderson 31'; Hunter (yellow card) 85'; Lowe (yellow card) 90+2'	Stadium: Abbey Stadium; Attendance: 0 Referee: Declan Bourne

14 November 2020 12	Cambridge United	1–1	Barrow	Cambridge
15:00 GMT	Boateng (yellow card) 13'; Taylor (yellow card) 15'; Ironside 56'; Hannant (yellow card) 66'	Report	Kay (yellow card) 7'; Platt 90+6'	Stadium: Abbey Stadium; Attendance: 0 Referee: Josh Smith

24 November 2020 13	Cheltenham Town	1–1	Cambridge United	Cheltenham
19:00 GMT	Tozer 45+4'; Chapman (yellow card) 58'; Lloyd (yellow card) 90+3'	Report	Digby (yellow card) 90+3'; Mullin 90+5'	Stadium: Whaddon Road; Attendance: 0 Referee: Craig Hicks

2 December 2020 14	Cambridge United	0–1	Mansfield Town	Cambridge
19:45 GMT		Report	Menayese (yellow card) 24'; Sweeney (yellow card) 34'; Reid 64'	Stadium: The Abbey Stadium; Attendance: 1,917; Referee: Robert Lewis

5 December 2020 15	Cambridge United	1–2	Oldham Athletic	Cambridge
15:00 GMT	Mullin (penalty missed) 43' 90+1'; Dunk (yellow card) 45+1'	Report	Grant (yellow card) 41'; McCalmont (yellow card) 53' (goal) 60'; McAleny 57' (yellow card) 63'; Borthwick-Jackson (yellow card) 77'	Stadium: Abbey Stadium; Attendance: 1,970; Referee: Brett Huxtable

12 December 2020 16	Forest Green Rovers	2–0	Cambridge United	Nailsworth
15:00 GMT	Matt (yellow card) 45+1' (goal) 65' (pen.); Collins 58'	Report		Stadium: The New Lawn; Attendance: 799; Referee: James Oldham

15 December 2020 17	Cambridge United	2–1	Colchester United	Cambridge
19:45 GMT	Mullin 50', 65'; Digby (yellow card) 79'	Report	Senior (yellow card) 17'; Folivi 68' (pen.)	Stadium: The Abbey Stadium; Attendance: 1,949; Referee: Kevin Johnson

19 December 2020 18	Bradford City	1–0	Cambridge United	Bradford
15:00 GMT	Pritchard 42'; Novak (yellow card) 84'; O'Connor (yellow card) 85'	Report	Hannant (yellow card) 77'	Stadium: Utilita Energy Stadium; Attendance: 0 Referee: Chris Sarginson

26 December 2020 19	Cambridge United	2–1	Leyton Orient	Cambridge
13:00 GMT	Hannant (yellow card) 33'; Hoolahan 55'; Mullin 57'; May (yellow card) 84'	Report	Johnson 23'; Happe (yellow card) 63'	Stadium: The Abbey Stadium; Attendance: 0 Referee: Will Finnie

29 December 2020 20	Stevenage	1–0	Cambridge United	Stevenage
17:00 GMT	Carter 22'	Report	May (yellow card) 48'; Darling (yellow card) 62'	Stadium: Lamex Stadium; Attendance: 0 Referee: Thomas Bramall

2 January 2021 21	Grimsby Town	1–2	Cambridge United	Cleethorpes
15:00 GMT	Hewitt 72'	Report	May 4'; Mullin 36'; Hannant (yellow card) 90+1'	Stadium: Blundell Park; Attendance: 0 Referee: Andy Haines

9 January 2021 22	Cambridge United	2–1	Harrogate Town	Cambridge
15:00 GMT	Darling (yellow card) 64'; Ironside 71', (yellow card) 90+3'; Hoolahan 81'; Dunk (yellow card) 90+6'	Report	Muldoon 10'; March (yellow card) 34'; Roberts (yellow card) 47'; Kerry (yellow card) 67' (yellow-red card) 78'; Falkingham (yellow card) 73'; Burrell (yellow card) 79'	Stadium: The Abbey Stadium; Attendance: 0 Referee: Carl Brook

16 January 2021 23	Colchester United	1–1	Cambridge United	Colchester
15:00 GMT	Harriott (yellow card) 37'; Taylor 39' (o.g.); Pell (yellow card) 54'	Report	Darling (yellow card) 4'; Knibbs 12'; Mullin (yellow card) 37'	Stadium: JobServe Community Stadium; Attendance: 0 Referee: Steve Martin

19 January 2021 24	Southend United	1–2	Cambridge United	Southend-on-Sea
19:00 GMT	Akinola 27'; Hart (yellow card) 40'; Oxley (yellow card) 90+6'	Report	Digby (yellow card) 40'; Iredale 46'; Ironside 68'	Stadium: Roots Hall; Attendance: 0 Referee: Bobby Madley

23 January 2021 25	Cambridge United	0–0	Bradford City	Cambridge
15:00 GMT	Hannant (yellow card) 77'	Report	Sutton (yellow card) 70'	Stadium: Abbey Stadium; Attendance: 0 Referee: Sam Allison

30 January 2021 26	Cambridge United	3–1	Crawley Town	Cambridge
15:00 GMT	Ironside 11'; Hoolahan (yellow card) 33', (goal) 85'; Knoyle 45+2'; May (yellow card) 76'; Tracey (yellow card) 83'	Report	Hessenthaler 14'	Stadium: Abbey Stadium; Attendance: 0 Referee: John Busby

6 February 2021 27	Barrow	0–2	Cambridge United	Barrow-in-Furness
15:00 GMT	Davies (yellow card) 73'; Donohue (yellow card) 90+1'	Report	Mullin 43'; Ironside 84'; O'Neil (yellow card) 90+3'	Stadium: Progression Solicitors Stadium; Attendance: 0 Referee: Graham Salisbury

9 February 2021 28	Salford City	4–1	Cambridge United	Salford
17:30 GMT	Henderson 19', 69'; Towell 33'; Gotts 42'	Report	Mullin 71'	Stadium: Moor Lane; Attendance: 0 Referee: Ollie Yates

13 February 2021 29	Cambridge United	0–0	Southend United	Cambridge
15:00 GMT	May (yellow card) 41'; Okedina (yellow card) 85'; Mullin (yellow card) 89'	Report		Stadium: Abbey Stadium; Attendance: 0 Referee: Ross Joyce

20 February 2021 30	Mansfield Town	0–3	Cambridge United	Mansfield
15:00 GMT	Maris (yellow card) 90'	Report	Mullin 57', 65'; Knibbs 90+1'	Stadium: One Call Stadium; Attendance: 0 Referee: Sam Purkiss

23 February 2021 31	Cambridge United	0–1	Cheltenham Town	Cambridge
19:00 GMT	Hannant (yellow card) 66'; Boateng (yellow card) 83'	Report	Long (yellow card) 60' (goal) 63'; Azaz (yellow card) 79'	Stadium: Abbey Stadium; Attendance: 0 Referee: James Oldham

27 February 2021 32	Port Vale	0–1	Cambridge United	Burslem
15:15 GMT		Report	O'Neil 85'	Stadium: Vale Park; Attendance: 0 Referee: Lee Swabey

2 March 2021 33	Cambridge United	0–1	Scunthorpe United	Cambridge
19:00 GMT	Mullin (yellow card) 90+1'; Ironside (yellow card) 90+5'	Report	Beestin 78'	Stadium: Abbey Stadium; Attendance: 0 Referee: Craig Hicks

6 March 2021 34	Cambridge United	1–0	Walsall	Cambridge
15:00 GMT	Mullin 90+4'	Report		Stadium: Abbey Stadium; Attendance: 0 Referee: Ben Toner

9 March 2021 35	Bolton Wanderers	2–1	Cambridge United	Bolton
19:00 GMT	Doyle 38'; Sarcevic 43'; Lee (yellow card) 90+4'	Report	Mullin (yellow card) 49'; Ironside (yellow card) 58'; Drysdale (yellow card) 59'; Knoyle 80'	Stadium: University of Bolton Stadium; Attendance: 0 Referee: Peter Wright

13 March 2021 36	Oldham Athletic	2–4	Cambridge United	Oldham
15:00 GMT	Keillor-Dunn 3', 11' (penalty missed) 68'	Report	Mullin 25' (pen.); Taylor (yellow card) 27'; Iredale 36', 45+2' (yellow card) 57'; O'Neil (yellow card) 45+4'; Hannant 74'; Drysdale (yellow card) 77'	Stadium: Boundary Park; Attendance: 0 Referee: Brett Huxtable

20 March 2021 37	Cambridge United	1–0	Forest Green Rovers	Cambridge
15:00 GMT	Mullin (penalty missed) 17'; Ironside (yellow card) 32'; Hoolahan 38'	Report	Wilson (yellow card) 23'; Matt (yellow card) 76'	Stadium: Abbey Stadium; Attendance: 0 Referee: Marc Edwards

27 March 2021 38	Carlisle United	1–2	Cambridge United	Carlisle
15:00 GMT	Hayden (yellow card) 24'; Furman (yellow card) 29'; Zanzala (yellow card) 68'; Alessandra 78'	Report	Mullin 45+3'; May 90+1'	Stadium: Brunton Park; Attendance: 0 Referee: Tom Nield

2 April 2021 39	Cambridge United	2–1	Morecambe	Cambridge
15:00 BST	Mullin 19', 81' (pen.); Taylor (yellow card) 83'; Ironside (yellow card) 88'; Digby (yellow card) 90+3'; Burton (yellow card) 90+4'	Report	Mendes Gomes (yellow card) 52'; Gibson (red card) 55'; Stockton (penalty missed) 66'; Wildig (yellow card) 82'; Price 88'	Stadium: Abbey Stadium; Attendance: 0 Referee: David Rock

5 April 2021 40	Tranmere Rovers	1–1	Cambridge United	Birkenhead
15:00 BST	Lewis 11' (yellow card) 80'; Clarke (yellow card) 60'	Report	Mullin (penalty missed) 60' 60'	Stadium: Prenton Park; Attendance: 0 Referee: Martin Coy

10 April 2021 41	Cambridge United	1–4	Exeter City	Cambridge
15:00 BST	Iredale (yellow card) 12'; Ironside (yellow card) 41' (goal) 55'; Knoyle (yellow card) 50'; Digby (yellow card) 90'	Report	Bowman 3' (yellow card) 50'; Sparkes 15'; Collins 67'; Jay 80'	Stadium: Abbey Stadium; Attendance: 0 Referee: Kevin Johnson

17 April 2021 42	Newport County	0–1	Cambridge United	Newport
12:30 BST	Sheehan (yellow card) 20'; Lewis (yellow card) 56'; Collins (yellow card) 84'	Report	Drysdale 79'; Hoolahan (yellow card) 83'	Stadium: Rodney Parade; Attendance: 0 Referee: Thomas Bramall

20 April 2021 43	Leyton Orient	2–4	Cambridge United	Leyton
19:00 BST	Johnson (yellow card) 21'; Kemp 45+1'; Turley (yellow card) 49'; Drysdale 73' (o.g.); Akinola (yellow card) 78'; Vigouroux (yellow card) 90+6'	Report	Ironside 19', 80'; Tracey 64'; Mullin 69' (pen.)	Stadium: Breyer Group Stadium; Attendance: 0 Referee: Christopher Pollard

24 April 2021 44	Cambridge United	0–1	Stevenage	Cambridge
15:00 BST	Knoyle (yellow card) 71'	Report	Norris 63'	Stadium: Abbey Stadium; Attendance: 0 Referee: Ross Joyce

30 April 2021 45	Harrogate Town	5–4	Cambridge United	Harrogate
19:00 BST	Kiernan 9', 20' (pen.), 32'; Beck 13'; Williams (yellow card) 73'; Burrell (yellow card) 76'; Lokko 84'	Report	Burton (yellow card) 19'; Hoolahan 26'; Hannant 29'; Mullin 59', 74' (pen.)	Stadium: The EnviroVent Stadium; Attendance: 0 Referee: Ollie Yates

8 May 2021 46	Cambridge United	3–0	Grimsby Town	Cambridge
15:00 BST	O'Neil 25'; Hoolahan 57'; Mullin 80'	Report		Stadium: Abbey Stadium; Attendance: 0 Referee: Tom Nield

=== FA Cup ===
The draw for the first round was made on Monday 26, October.

Win Draw Loss

7 November 2020 First round	Cambridge United	0–2	Shrewsbury Town	Cambridge
15:00 GMT	Taylor (yellow card) 64'	Report	Daniels 47'; Udoh (yellow card) 51'; Norburn (yellow card) 78'; Walker 89'	Stadium: Abbey Stadium; Attendance: 0 Referee: Peter Wright

=== EFL Cup ===
Win Draw Loss

The first round draw was made on 18 August, live on Sky Sports, by Paul Merson. The draw for both the second and third round were confirmed on September 6, live on Sky Sports by Phil Babb.

5 September 2020 First round	Birmingham City	0–1	Cambridge United	Bordesley
15:00 BST		Report	Cundy 18'	Stadium: St Andrew's Trillion Trophy Stadium; Attendance: 0 Referee: Leigh Doughty

15 September 2020 Second round	Newport County	1–0	Cambridge United	Newport
19:00 BST	Twine 80'	Report	Mullin (yellow card) 79'	Stadium: Rodney Parade; Attendance: 0 Referee: Lee Swabey

=== EFL Trophy ===
Win Draw Loss

The regional group stage draw was confirmed on 18 August. The second round draw was made by Matt Murray on 20 November, at St Andrew's. The third round was made on 10 December 2020 by Jon Parkin.

Pos	Div	Team	Pld	W	PW	PL	L	GF	GA	GD	Pts	Qualification
1	L2	Cambridge United	3	2	1	0	0	7	3	+4	8	Advance to Round 2
2	L1	Peterborough United	3	1	1	1	0	8	6	+2	6	Advance to Round 2
3	L1	Burton Albion	3	0	1	1	1	6	8	−2	3	
4	ACA	Fulham U21	3	0	0	1	2	3	7	−4	1	

Source: EFL.com

8 September 2020 Group stage	Cambridge United	2–0	Fulham U21	Cambridge
19:30 BST	Knowles 24'; Simper (yellow card) 60'; Mullin 84'	Report		Stadium: The Abbey Stadium; Attendance: 862; Referee: Darren Drysdale

6 October 2020 Group stage	Burton Albion	2–4	Cambridge United	Burton upon Trent
19:00 BST	Akins 3'; Powell 4'; Gallacher (yellow card) 20'; Daniel (yellow card) 45+3'	Report	Knibbs 27' (yellow card) 90'; Hannant 31', 86'; Digby (yellow card) 73'; Darling 79'	Stadium: Pirelli Stadium; Attendance: 0 Referee: Ross Joyce

10 November 2020 Group stage	Cambridge United	1–1 (3–1 p)	Peterborough United	Cambridge
19:00 GMT	Dunk (yellow card) 25'; Worman 86'; Knowles (yellow card) 90+4'	Report	Clarke 49' (yellow card) 85'; Blake-Tracey (yellow card) 77'	Stadium: Abbey Stadium; Attendance: 0 Referee: John Busby
	Penalties
	Dunk (penalty scored); Knowles (penalty scored); Dallas (penalty scored)		Burrows (penalty missed); Hamilton (penalty scored); Tasdemir (penalty missed); Eisa (penalty missed)

8 December 2020 Second round	Cambridge United	2–0	Gillingham	Cambridge
19:45 GMT	Mullin 67' (pen.); Hannant 79'	Report	Woods (yellow card) 37'	Stadium: Abbey Stadium; Attendance: 724; Referee: David Rock

12 January 2021 Third round	Oxford United	1–0	Cambridge United	Oxford
19:00 GMT	Hall 74'; Kelly (yellow card) 90+2'	Report	Davies (yellow card) 64'; Darling (yellow card) 73'	Stadium: The Kassam Stadium; Attendance: 0 Referee: Charles Breakspear

== Statistics ==
=== Appearances and goals ===
Last updated 9 May 2021.

No.	Pos	Nat	Player	Total		EFL League Two		EFL Cup		EFL Trophy		FA Cup	
No.	Pos	Nat	Player	Apps	Goals	Apps	Goals	Apps	Goals	Apps	Goals	Apps	Goals
Goalkeepers
1	GK	(Bulgaria) BUL	Dimitar Mitov	22	0	20	0	1	0	0	0	1	0
13	GK	(Guyana) GUY	Kai McKenzie-Lyle	0	0	0	0	0	0	0	0	0	0
25	GK	(England) ENG	Callum Burton	33	0	27	0	1	0	5	0	0	0
30	GK	(England) ENG	Louis Chadwick	0	0	0	0	0	0	0	0	0	0
Defenders
2	DF	(England) ENG	Kyle Knoyle	52	2	46	2	2	0	3	0	1	0
3	DF	(Australia) AUS	Jack Iredale	45	4	38	4	2	0	4	0	1	0
5	DF	(England) ENG	Greg Taylor	52	0	46	0	2	0	3	0	1	0
6	DF	(England) ENG	Harry Darling (transferred out)	20	1	16	0	0	0	4	1	0	0
6	DF	(England) ENG	Declan Drysdale	13	1	13	1	0	0	0	0	0	0
15	DF	(England) ENG	Jubril Okedina	15	0	14	0	0	0	1	0	0	0
16	DF	(England) ENG	Robbie Cundy (loan expired)	23	1	17	0	2	1	3	0	1	0
16	DF	(England) ENG	Aji Alese	2	0	2	0	0	0	0	0	0	0
17	DF	(England) ENG	Leon Davies	19	0	13	0	1	0	5	0	0	0
29	DF	(England) ENG	Tom Dickens	0	0	0	0	0	0	0	0	0	0
Midfielders
4	MF	(England) ENG	Paul Digby	41	0	35	0	2	0	4	0	0	0
7	MF	(England) ENG	Luke Hannant	48	6	43	3	1	0	3	3	1	0
8	MF	(England) ENG	Liam O'Neil	23	2	21	2	1	0	1	0	0	0
11	MF	(England) ENG	Harrison Dunk	49	0	41	0	2	0	5	0	1	0
14	MF	(Republic of Ireland) IRL	Wes Hoolahan	35	7	33	7	0	0	1	0	1	0
18	MF	(Tunisia) TUN	Idris El Mizouni (loan expired)	15	0	11	0	0	0	3	0	1	0
19	MF	(England) ENG	Adam May	46	3	38	3	2	0	5	0	1	0
22	MF	(England) ENG	Lewis Simper	1	0	0	0	0	0	1	0	0	0
23	MF	(England) ENG	Tom Knowles (transferred out)	5	1	0	0	1	0	3	1	1	0
27	MF	(England) ENG	Ben Worman	2	1	0	0	0	0	2	1	0	0
44	MF	(England) ENG	Hiram Boateng	27	0	25	0	0	0	1	0	1	0
Forwards
9	FW	(Scotland) SCO	Andrew Dallas (out on loan)	5	0	1	0	0	0	3	0	1	0
10	FW	(England) ENG	Paul Mullin	50	34	46	32	2	0	2	2	0	0
18	FW	(England) ENG	Shilow Tracey	17	1	17	1	0	0	0	0	0	0
20	FW	(England) ENG	Joe Ironside	49	14	44	14	2	0	3	0	0	0
26	FW	(England) ENG	Harvey Knibbs	31	3	23	2	2	0	5	1	1	0
28	FW	(England) ENG	Joe Neal	1	0	0	0	0	0	1	0	0	0

=== Top scorers ===
Includes all competitive matches. The list is sorted by squad number when total goals are equal.

Last updated 9 May 2021.

Rank	Position	Nationality	No.	Player	EFL League Two	EFL Cup	EFL Trophy	FA Cup	Total
1	FW	(England)	10	Paul Mullin	32	0	2	0	34
2	FW	(England)	20	Joe Ironside	14	0	0	0	14
3	MF	(Republic of Ireland)	14	Wes Hoolahan	7	0	0	0	7
4	MF	(England)	7	Luke Hannant	3	0	3	0	6
4	DF	(Australia)	3	Jack Iredale	4	0	0	0	4
5	MF	(England)	19	Adam May	3	0	0	0	3
5	FW	(England)	26	Harvey Knibbs	2	0	1	0	3
6	DF	(England)	2	Kyle Knoyle	2	0	0	0	2
6	MF	(England)	8	Liam O'Neil	2	0	0	0	2
7	DF	(England)	6	Harry Darling	0	0	1	0	1
7	DF	(England)	6	Declan Drysdale	1	0	0	0	1
7	DF	(England)	16	Robbie Cundy	0	1	0	0	1
7	FW	(England)	18	Shilow Tracey	1	0	0	0	1
7	MF	(England)	23	Tom Knowles	0	0	1	0	1
7	MF	(England)	27	Ben Worman	0	0	1	0	1
	Own goals				2	0	0	0	0
	TOTALS				73	1	9	0	83

=== Cleansheets ===
Includes all competitive matches. The list is sorted by squad number when total cleansheets are equal.

Last updated 9 May 2021.

Rank	Position	Nationality	No.	Player	EFL League Two	EFL Cup	EFL Trophy	FA Cup	Total
1
1	GK	(England)	25	Callum Burton	9	0	2	0	11
2
2	GK	(Bulgaria)	1	Dimitar Mitov	6	1	0	0	7
TOTALS					15	1	2	0	18

=== Disciplinary record ===
Includes all competitive matches.

Last updated 9 May 2021.

Position	Nationality	Number	Name	League Two		EFL Cup		EFL Trophy		FA Cup		Total	
Position	Nationality	Number	Name	Booked	Sent off (straight red)	Booked	Sent off (straight red)	Booked	Sent off (straight red)	Booked	Sent off (straight red)	Booked	Sent off (straight red)
FW	(England)	20	Joe Ironside	8	0	0	0	0	0	0	0	8	0
MF	(England)	4	Paul Digby	7	0	0	0	1	0	0	0	7	0
MF	(England)	7	Luke Hannant	7	0	0	0	0	0	0	0	7	0
FW	(England)	10	Paul Mullin	5	0	1	0	0	0	0	0	6	0
MF	(England)	19	Adam May	6	0	0	0	0	0	0	0	6	0
DF	(England)	5	Greg Taylor	3	0	0	0	0	0	1	0	4	0
DF	(England)	6	Harry Darling	3	0	0	0	1	0	0	0	4	0
MF	(England)	11	Harrison Dunk	3	0	0	0	1	0	0	0	4	0
DF	(Australia)	3	Jack Iredale	3	0	0	0	0	0	0	0	3	0
DF	(England)	6	Declan Drysdale	3	0	0	0	0	0	0	0	3	0
MF	(England)	44	Hiram Boateng	3	0	0	0	0	0	0	0	3	0
DF	(England)	2	Kyle Knoyle	3	0	0	0	0	0	0	0	3	0
MF	(England)	8	Liam O'Neil	2	0	0	0	0	0	0	0	2	0
MF	(Republic of Ireland)	14	Wes Hoolahan	2	0	0	0	0	0	0	0	2	0
DF	(England)	15	Jubril Okedina	1	0	0	0	0	0	0	0	1	0
DF	(England)	16	Robbie Cundy	1	0	0	0	0	0	0	0	1	0
DF	(England)	17	Leon Davies	0	0	0	0	1	0	0	0	1	0
FW	(England)	18	Shilow Tracey	1	0	0	0	0	0	0	0	1	0
MF	(England)	22	Lewis Simper	0	0	0	0	1	0	0	0	1	0
MF	(England)	23	Tom Knowles	0	0	0	0	1	0	0	0	1	0
GK	(England)	25	Callum Burton	1	0	0	0	0	0	0	0	1	0
FW	(England)	26	Harvey Knibbs	0	0	0	0	1	0	0	0	1	0
			TOTALS	62	0	1	0	7	0	1	0	71	0
