= Joe Neal =

Joe Neal may refer to:

- Joe Neal (politician), member of the Nevada Senate
- Joe Neal (footballer), English footballer

== See also ==
- Joseph Neal, member of the South Carolina House of Representatives
- Joseph Ladd Neal, American architect
- Joe Neale, baseball player
