= Joe Neal (footballer) =

English footballer

Personal information
- Full name: Joe Loram John Neal
- Date of birth: 22 October 2000 (age 26)
- Place of birth: Bury St Edmunds, England
- Height: 1.76 m (5 ft 9 1/2 in)
- Position: Forward

Team information
- Current team: Needham Market

Youth career
- 2008–2019: Cambridge United

Senior career*
Years	Team	Apps	(Gls)
2019–2021	Cambridge United	0	(0)
2019	→ Royston Town (loan)	16	(1)
2019	→ Needham Market (loan)	19	(1)
2020	→ St Neots Town (loan)	4	(2)
2020	→ Biggleswade Town (loan)	8	(5)
2021–2022	Biggleswade Town	26	(11)
2022–2023	St Albans City	52	(2)
2023–2025	AFC Sudbury	76	(24)
2025–	Needham Market	0	(0)
- * Club domestic league appearances and goals as of 15:40, 1 June 2025 (UTC)

Joe Neal (born 22 October 2000) is an English semi-professional footballer who plays as a forward for Needham Market.

== Playing career ==
=== Cambridge United ===
Neal joined the Cambridge United Academy in 2008 and signed his first two-and-a-half-year professional contract in February 2019. He was handed the contract after impressing on loan at Southern League Premier Division Central side Royston Town the previous month. He made his debut in first-team football on 19 January, in a 1–0 defeat at Kettering Town and scored a brace on his home debut three days later in a 4–4 draw with Lowestoft Town. In total he scored three goals in 18 games for Steve Castle's "Crows".

He began the 2019–20 season on loan at Needham Market, having scored a brace for the club in a pre-season friendly. He went on to score five goals in 29 appearances for Richard Wilkins's "Marketmen". He played four games on loan at St Neots Town in January 2020; "Saints" manager Barry Corr said that "I expect him to score goals".

He was loaned out to Biggleswade Town and scored a hat-trick in a 7–4 win over Leiston on 29 September 2020. He was recalled to Cambridge after the 2020–21 season was cancelled at Southern League level due to the COVID-19 pandemic in England, having scored five goals in ten games for Chris Nunn's "Waders". He made his first-team debut for Cambridge on 10 November 2020, coming on as a 79th-minute substitute for Harvey Knibbs in a 1–1 draw with Peterborough United in an EFL Trophy game at the Abbey Stadium; Cambridge went on to lose the penalty shoot-out 3–1.

On 17 May 2021, Cambridge United announced they would not be offering Neal a new contract.

=== Biggleswade Town ===
Neal signed permanently for Biggleswade Town on 2 August 2021.

=== St Albans City ===
Neal signed permanently for St Albans City on 15 February 2022.

=== AFC Sudbury ===
Neal signed permanently for AFC Sudbury on 1 July 2023.

== Style of play ==
Neal is a free-kick specialist.

== Statistics ==
As of match played 27 April 2024

Club	Season	League			FA Cup		League Cup		Other		Total	
Club	Season	Division	Apps	Goals	Apps	Goals	Apps	Goals	Apps	Goals	Apps	Goals
Cambridge United	2018–19	EFL League Two	0	0	0	0	0	0	0	0	0	0
Cambridge United	2019–20	EFL League Two	0	0	0	0	0	0	0	0	0	0
Cambridge United	2020–21	EFL League Two	0	0	0	0	0	0	1	0	1	0
Cambridge United	Total		0	0	0	0	0	0	1	0	1	0
Royston Town (loan)	2018–19	Southern League Premier Division Central	16	1	0	0	2	2	0	0	18	3
Needham Market (loan)	2019–20	Southern League Premier Division Central	19	1	3	1	4	1	3 (Note: 2 appearances and 1 goal in the FA Trophy and 2 appearances and 1 goal in the Suffolk Senior Cup.)	2	29	5
St Neots Town (loan)	2019–20	Southern League Division One Central	4	2	0	0	0	0	0	0	4	2
Biggleswade Town (loan)	2020–21	Southern League Premier Division Central	8	5	1	0	0	0	1 (Note: Appearance/s in the FA Trophy.)	0	10	5
Biggleswade Town (loan)	Total		47	9	4	1	6	3	5	2	62	15
Biggleswade Town	2021–22	Southern League Premier Division Central	26	11	1	0	2	1	3	3	31	15
St Albans City	2021–22	National League South	16	0	0	0	0	0	0	0	16	0
St Albans City	2022–23	National League South	36	2	0	0	0	0	0	0	36	2
A.F.C. Sudbury	2023–24	Southern League Premier Division Central	34	14	2	1	0	0	2	1	38	15
A.F.C. Sudbury	2024–25	Southern League Premier Division Central	0	0	0	0	0	0	0	0	0	0
Career total			159	36	7	2	8	4	10	6	183	47
