= EFL League Two Player of the Month =

English football award

The EFL League Two Player of the Month is an association football award that recognises the player adjudged the best for each month of the season in EFL League Two, the fourth tier of English football. Originally named the Football League Two Player of the Month award, it replaced the Third Division Player of the Month as League Two replaced the Third Division in 2004, and in 2016, when the Football League rebranded itself as the English Football League (EFL), the award was renamed accordingly. From the 2013–14 season, the Football League is sponsored by Sky Bet, so it is known as the Sky Bet League Two Player of the Month award. The awards are designed and manufactured in the UK by bespoke awards company Gaudio Awards.

== List of winners ==
- Each year in the table below is linked to the corresponding football season.

Month	Year	Nationality	Player	Team	Ref
August	2004	England	Jon Parkin	Macclesfield Town	
September	2004	England	Phil Jevons	Yeovil Town	
October	2004	England	Lee Steele	Leyton Orient	
November	2004	England	Paul Hayes	Scunthorpe United	
December	2004	England	Lee Johnson	Yeovil Town	
January	2005	England	Lee Trundle	Swansea City	
February	2005	Wales	Matthew Tipton	Macclesfield Town	
March	2005	Wales	Freddy Eastwood	Southend United	
April	2005	Netherlands	Clyde Wijnhard	Darlington	
August	2005	England	Nathan Tyson	Wycombe Wanderers	
September	2005	England	Gary Alexander	Leyton Orient	
October	2005	England	Ian Ross	Boston United	
November	2005	England	Karl Hawley	Carlisle United	
December	2005	England	Scott McGleish	Northampton Town	
January	2006	England	Michael Bridges	Carlisle United	
February	2006	England	Richie Barker	Mansfield Town	
March	2006	Grenada	Tony Bedeau	Torquay United	
April	2006	England	Scott McGleish	Northampton Town	
August	2006	Wales	Christian Roberts	Swindon Town	
September	2006	England	Mark Stallard	Lincoln City	
October	2006	England	Jamie Forrester	Lincoln City	
November	2006	Scotland	Steve Phillips	Bristol Rovers	
December	2006	Greece	Dimitrios Konstantopoulos	Hartlepool United	
January	2007	England	Michael Nelson	Hartlepool United	
February	2007	Wales	Wayne Hennessey	Stockport County	
March	2007	England	Glenn Murray	Rochdale	
April	2007	England	Dean Keates	Walsall	
August	2007	England	Jim Bentley	Morecambe	
September	2007	Jamaica	Trevor Benjamin	Hereford United	
October	2007	England	Lloyd Dyer	Milton Keynes Dons	
November	2007	England	Jack Lester	Chesterfield	
December	2007	France	Willy Guéret	Milton Keynes Dons	
January	2008	England	Danny North	Grimsby Town	
February	2008	England	Joe Lewis	Peterborough United	
March	2008	England	John Ruddy	Stockport County	
April	2008	England	Aaron Wilbraham	Milton Keynes Dons	
August	2008	England	Solomon Taiwo	Dagenham & Redbridge	
September	2008	England	Matthew Gill	Exeter City	
October	2008	Northern Ireland	Jamie Ward	Chesterfield	
November	2008	England	Grant Holt	Shrewsbury Town	
December	2008	Jamaica	Marcus Bean	Brentford	
January	2009	France	Dany N'Guessan	Lincoln City	
February	2009	England	Charlie MacDonald	Brentford	
March	2009	England	Reuben Reid	Rotherham United	
April	2009	England	Sam Saunders	Dagenham & Redbridge	
August	2009	Nigeria	Ismail Yakubu	Barnet	
September	2009	Jersey	Brett Pitman	AFC Bournemouth	
October	2009	Denmark	Kasper Schmeichel	Notts County	
November	2009	England	Laurence Wilson	Morecambe	
December	2009	England	Craig Dawson	Rochdale	
January	2010	England	Ryan Lowe	Bury	
February	2010	Wales	Wayne Brown	Bury	
March	2010	England	Neal Bishop	Notts County	
April	2010	England	Lee Hughes	Notts County	
August	2010	England	Adam Le Fondre	Rotherham United	
September	2010	England	Ryan Lowe	Bury	
October	2010	Wales	Craig Davies	Chesterfield	
November	2010	England	Mark Wright	Shrewsbury Town	
December	2010	England	Greg Tansey	Stockport County	
January	2011	England	Cody McDonald	Gillingham	
February	2011	England	Ryan Lowe	Bury	
March	2011	Wales	Craig Davies	Chesterfield	
April	2011	England	Ryan Lowe	Bury	
August	2011	England	Mark Arber	Dagenham & Redbridge	
September	2011	England	Danny Carlton	Morecambe	
October	2011	England	Danny Hylton	Aldershot Town	
November	2011	Northern Ireland	Billy Kee	Burton Albion	
December	2011	England	Bryan Hughes	Accrington Stanley	
January	2012	England	Mark Ellis	Torquay United	
February	2012	England	Paul Benson	Swindon Town	
March	2012	England	Lee Mansell	Torquay United	
April	2012	France	Bilel Mohsni	Southend United	
August	2012	England	Jake Wright	Oxford United	
September	2012	England	Tom Pope	Port Vale	
October	2012	England	Ashley Vincent	Port Vale	
November	2012	England	Adebayo Akinfenwa	Northampton Town	
December	2012	England	Ashley Grimes	Rochdale	
January	2013	England	Tom Parkes	Bristol Rovers	
February	2013	DR Congo	Jacques Maghoma	Burton Albion	
March	2013	England	Jason Banton	Plymouth Argyle	
April	2013	England	Chris Smith	York City	
August	2013	England	Gary Roberts	Chesterfield	
September	2013	England	Antoni Sarcevic	Fleetwood Town	
October	2013	England	Luke James	Hartlepool United	
November	2013	England	Zavon Hines	Dagenham & Redbridge	
December	2013	Jamaica	Deon Burton	Scunthorpe United	
January	2014	England	Ryan Clarke	Oxford United	
February	2014	England	Scott Hogan	Rochdale	
March	2014	England	Jamie Allen	Rochdale	
April	2014	England	Josh Morris	Fleetwood Town	
August	2014	England	Matt Tubbs	AFC Wimbledon	
September	2014	England	Luke Wilkinson	Luton Town	
October	2014	England	Mark Cullen	Luton Town	
November	2014	England	David Worrall	Southend United	
December	2014	England	Paris Cowan-Hall	Wycombe Wanderers	
January	2015	Northern Ireland	Rory Donnelly	Tranmere Rovers	
February	2015	England	Jed Wallace	Portsmouth	
March	2015	England	Bobby Grant	Shrewsbury Town	
April	2015	England	Adam Barrett	Southend United	
August	2015	England	Dean Cox	Leyton Orient	
September	2015	England	Michael Gash	Barnet	
October	2015	England	Shaun Miller	Morecambe	
November	2015	England	Jay Simpson	Leyton Orient	
December	2015	England	Gareth Evans	Portsmouth	
January	2016	England	Ricky Holmes	Northampton Town	
February	2016	England	Bradley Fewster	York City	
March	2016	England	Matty Taylor	Bristol Rovers	
April	2016	Ghana	Tarique Fosu	Accrington Stanley	
August	2016	England	James Coppinger	Doncaster Rovers	
September	2016	England	Jon Stead	Notts County	
October	2016	England	Jason Kennedy	Carlisle United	
November	2016	England	Omar Bogle	Grimsby Town	
December	2016	England	Scott Kashket	Wycombe Wanderers	
January	2017	England	Ollie Watkins	Exeter City	
February	2017	England	Matt Godden	Stevenage	
March	2017	Northern Ireland	Shay McCartan	Accrington Stanley	
April	2017	England	Mickey Demetriou	Newport County	
August	2017	England	Frank Nouble	Newport County	
September	2017	England	Shaq Coulthirst	Barnet	
October	2017	England	Tom Pope	Port Vale	
November	2017	Wales	Christian Doidge	Forest Green Rovers	
December	2017	England	Sammie Szmodics	Colchester United	
January	2018	Scotland	Marc McNulty	Coventry City	
February	2018	England	Marc Richards	Swindon Town	
March	2018	Sudan	Mohamed Eisa	Cheltenham Town	
April	2018	England	Mitch Rose	Grimsby Town	
August	2018	England	James Norwood	Tranmere Rovers	
September	2018	England	Sam Surridge	Oldham Athletic	
October	2018	Ireland	James McKeown	Grimsby Town	
November	2018	Ireland	Jay O'Shea	Bury	
December	2018	England	Danny Grainger	Carlisle United	
January	2019	Ireland	Jay O'Shea	Bury	
February	2019	Portugal	Bruno Andrade	Lincoln City	
March	2019	England	Reece Brown	Forest Green Rovers	
April	2019	England	Joe Day	Newport County	
August	2019	England	James Hanson	Grimsby Town	
September	2019	England	James Clarke	Walsall	
October	2019	Ireland	Eoin Doyle	Swindon Town	
November	2019	Ireland	Eoin Doyle	Swindon Town	
December	2019	Ireland	Eoin Doyle	Swindon Town	
January	2020	Wales	Luke Jephcott	Plymouth Argyle	
February	2020	England	Callum Morton	Northampton Town	
September	2020	England	Ian Henderson	Salford City	
October	2020	England	Paul Mullin	Cambridge United	
November	2020	Jamaica	Jevani Brown	Colchester United	
December	2020	England	Max Watters	Crawley Town	
January	2021	Ireland	Wes Hoolahan	Cambridge United	
February	2021	Portugal	Ricardo Santos	Bolton Wanderers	
March	2021	England	Matt Jay	Exeter City	
April	2021	England	Ian Henderson	Salford City	
August	2021	England	Matty Stevens	Forest Green Rovers	
September	2021	Scotland	Nicky Cadden	Forest Green Rovers	
October	2021	England	Dom Telford	Newport County	
November	2021	England	Dom Telford	Newport County	
December	2021	England	Jake Beesley	Rochdale	
January	2022	England	Luke McGee	Forest Green Rovers	
February	2022	England	Davis Keillor-Dunn	Oldham Athletic	
March	2022	Cyprus	Ruel Sotiriou	Leyton Orient	
April	2022	Scotland	Elliot Anderson	Bristol Rovers	
August	2022	England	Sam Hoskins	Northampton Town	
September	2022	England	Andy Cook	Bradford City	
October	2022	Ireland	Paddy Madden	Stockport County	
November	2022	England	Billy Waters	Barrow	
December	2022	England	Kyle Wootton	Stockport County	
January	2023	England	Conor McAleny	Salford City	
February	2023	England	Dan Kemp	Hartlepool United	
March	2023	Scotland	Callum Hendry	Salford City	
April	2023	England	Andy Cook	Bradford City	
August	2023	England	Jake Young	Swindon Town	
September	2023	England	Louie Barry	Stockport County	
October	2023	England	Matt Smith	Salford City	
November	2023	England	Jake Young	Swindon Town	
December	2023	England	Dean Lewington	Milton Keynes Dons	
January	2024	Malta	Jodi Jones	Notts County	
February	2024	England	Hakeeb Adelakun	Doncaster Rovers	
March	2024	England	Paul Mullin	Wrexham	
April	2024	Ireland	Paddy Madden	Stockport County	
August	2024	England	Luke Molyneux	Doncaster Rovers	
September	2024	England	Glenn Morris	Gillingham	
October	2024	Northern Ireland	Will Grigg	Chesterfield	
November	2024	England	Alex Gilbey	Milton Keynes Dons	
December	2024	England	Nathan Lowe	Walsall	
January	2025	England	Shaun Whalley	Accrington Stanley	
February	2025	England	Antoni Sarcevic	Bradford City	
March	2025	England	George Lapslie	Bradford City	
April	2025	Switzerland	Lorent Tolaj	Port Vale	
August	2025	England	Matthew Dennis	Notts County	
September	2025	Ireland	Aaron Drinan	Swindon Town	
October	2025	England	Harry Anderson	Colchester United	
November	2025	England	Ryan Finnigan	Walsall	
December	2025	Northern Ireland	Lee Bonis	Chesterfield	
January	2026	England	Ben Knight	Cambridge United	
February	2026	England	Jack Payne	Colchester United	
March	2026	England	Mark Helm	Fleetwood Town	
April	2026	England	Callum Stead	Barnet	
August	2026	England	Harry Boyes	York City	
September	2026	Northern Ireland	Charlie McCann	Cheltenham Town	
October	2026	England	Kabongo Tshimanga	Barnet	

== Multiple winners ==
Up to and including the April 2024 award.

- The table lists all the players who have won more than once.

Rank	Player	Wins
1	(England) Ryan Lowe	4
2	(Republic of Ireland) Eoin Doyle	3
3	(England) Andy Cook	2
3	(Wales) Craig Davies	2
3	(England) Ian Henderson	2
3	(England) Scott McGleish	2
3	(Republic of Ireland) Paddy Madden	2
3	(England) Paul Mullin	2
3	(Republic of Ireland) Jay O'Shea	2
3	(England) Tom Pope	2
3	(England) Dom Telford	2
3	(England) Jake Young	2

== Awards won by nationality ==
Up to and including the October 2026 award.

Country	Wins
England	147
Ireland	10
Wales	9
Northern Ireland	7
Scotland	5
Jamaica	4
France	3
Portugal	2
Cyprus	1
DR Congo	1
Denmark	1
Ghana	1
Greece	1
Grenada	1
Jersey	1
Malta	1
Netherlands	1
Nigeria	1
Sudan	1
Switzerland	1

== Awards won by club ==
Up to and including the October 2026 award.

Club	Wins
Swindon Town	9
Bury	7
Chesterfield	7
Northampton Town	6
Notts County	6
Rochdale	6
Stockport County	6
Barnet	5
Forest Green Rovers	5
Grimsby Town	5
Leyton Orient	5
Milton Keynes Dons	5
Newport County	5
Salford City	5
Accrington Stanley	4
Bradford City	4
Bristol Rovers	4
Carlisle United	4
Colchester United	4
Dagenham & Redbridge	4
Hartlepool United	4
Lincoln City	4
Morecambe	4
Port Vale	4
Southend United	4
Walsall	4
Cambridge United	3
Doncaster Rovers	3
Exeter City	3
Fleetwood Town	3
Shrewsbury Town	3
Torquay United	3
Wycombe Wanderers	3
York City	3
Brentford	2
Burton Albion	2
Cheltenham Town	2
Gillingham	2
Luton Town	2
Macclesfield Town	2
Oldham Athletic	2
Oxford United	2
Plymouth Argyle	2
Portsmouth	2
Rotherham United	2
Scunthorpe United	2
Tranmere Rovers	2
Yeovil Town	2
AFC Bournemouth	1
AFC Wimbledon	1
Aldershot Town	1
Barrow	1
Bolton Wanderers	1
Boston United	1
Coventry City	1
Crawley Town	1
Darlington	1
Hereford United	1
Mansfield Town	1
Peterborough United	1
Stevenage	1
Stockport County	1
Swansea City	1
Wrexham	1

== See also ==
- Football League Two Manager of the Month
- Football League Championship Player of the Month
- Football League One Player of the Month
