= Kyle Knoyle =

English footballer (born 1996)

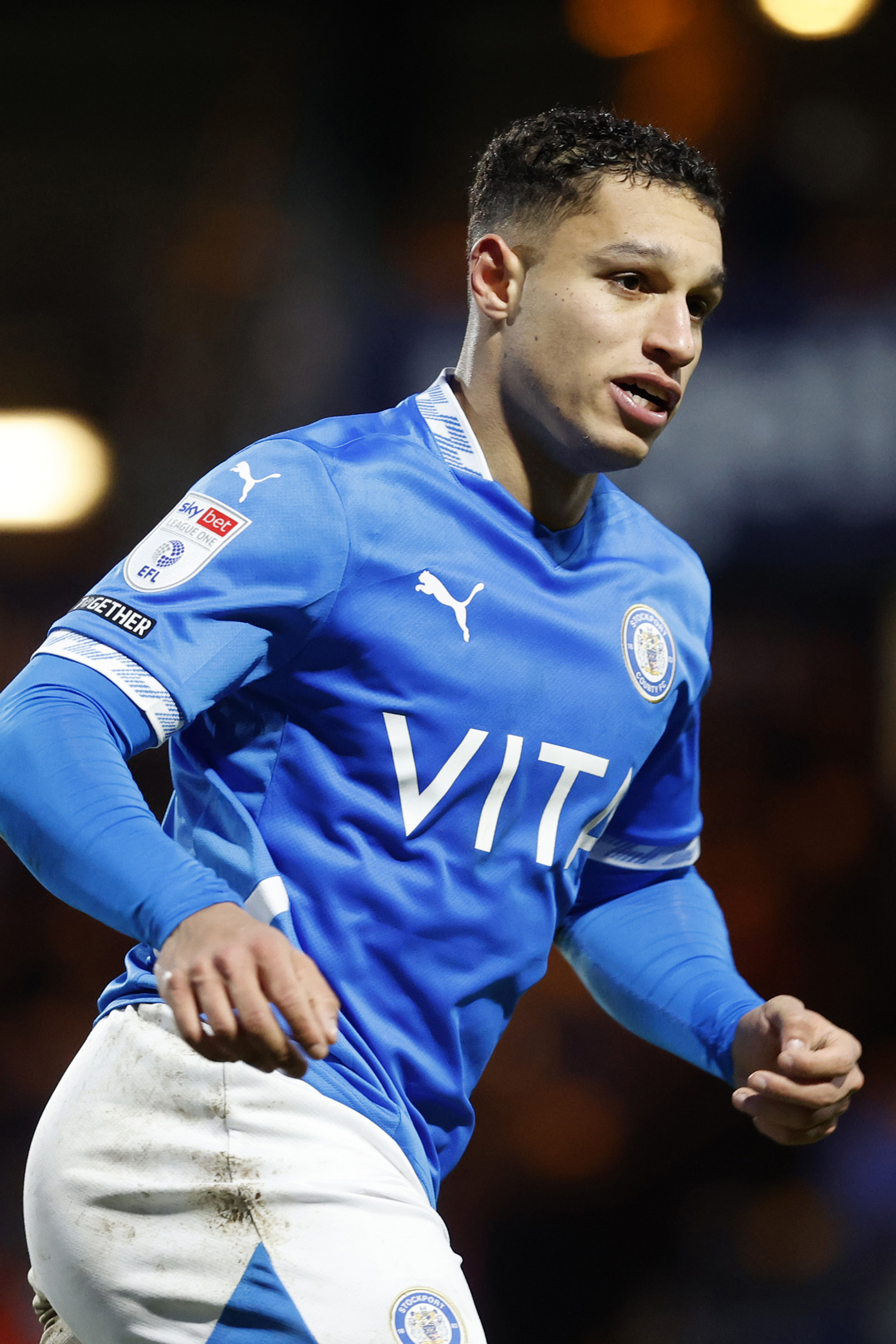
- Knoyle in action for Stockport County

Personal information
- Date of birth: 24 September 1996 (age 30)
- Place of birth: Newham, England
- Height: 1.73 m (5 ft 8 in)
- Position: Right-back

Team information
- Current team: Mansfield Town
- Number: 2

Youth career
- 2010–2015: West Ham United

Senior career*
Years	Team	Apps	(Gls)
2015–2017	West Ham United	0	(0)
2016	→ Dundee United (loan)	9	(0)
2016	→ Wigan Athletic (loan)	1	(0)
2017–2019	Swindon Town	60	(0)
2019–2021	Cambridge United	72	(3)
2021–2023	Doncaster Rovers	70	(2)
2023–2025	Stockport County	70	(2)
2025–	Mansfield Town	19	(0)

International career
2013–2015	England U18	3	(0)
- * Club domestic league appearances and goals as of 21:48, 18 February 2026 (UTC)

Kyle Andy P. Knoyle (born 24 September 1996) is an English professional footballer who plays as a right-back for EFL League One club Mansfield Town.

Knoyle began his career with West Ham United, making his debut in 2015, and was loaned by them to both Dundee United and Wigan Athletic. He joined Swindon Town in 2017 and then Cambridge in 2019 before joining Doncaster in 2021. He has represented the England under-18 team.

== Club career ==
=== West Ham United ===
Knoyle spent five years with the West Ham United Academy before signing a two-year professional contract in June 2015. was first included in a West Ham matchday squad for their UEFA Europa League first qualifying round second leg fixture away to Lusitanos of Andorra on 9 July 2015, remaining an unused substitute in a 1–0 victory (4–0 aggregate). With manager Slaven Bilić putting priority on the team's Premier League performance, he made an array of changes for their third qualifying round second leg away to FC Astra Giurgiu on 6 August, including giving Knoyle his debut as a starter.

On 22 January 2016, Knoyle signed on loan for Dundee United until the end of the 2015–16 season. He made his Tangerines debut on 27 February as an 82nd-minute substitute for Blair Spittal in a 3–0 win at Ross County in the Scottish Premiership. His full debut came on 2 April in a 1–0 win at St Johnstone's McDiarmid Park.

On 1 July 2016, Knoyle joined Championship side Wigan Athletic on a season-long loan. In a pre-season training camp in Portugal, Knoyle suffered a dislocated and broken elbow in an accident, an injury which was expected to keep him out of the side for a lengthy period.

Knoyle was released by West Ham at the end of the 2016–17 season.

=== Swindon Town ===
Knoyle joined League Two club Swindon Town on 2 August 2017 on a free transfer. At the end of the 2017–18 season, Swindon exercised an option to extend his contract. He was offered a new contract by Swindon at the end of the 2018–19 season, which he turned down.

=== Cambridge United ===
Knoyle signed a two-year contract with League Two club Cambridge United on 5 June 2019. Following an impressive 2020–21 season, Knoyle was named in the 2020–21 EFL League Two Team of the Season at the league's annual awards ceremony.

=== Doncaster Rovers ===
On 17 June 2021, Knoyle signed for Doncaster Rovers on a two-year contract.

=== Stockport County ===
On 13 January 2023, Knoyle signed for Stockport County from Doncaster Rovers for an undisclosed fee on a two-and-a-half-year contract.

On 20 May 2025, the club announced he would be leaving in June when his contract expired.

=== Mansfield Town ===
On 12 June 2025, Knoyle signed for Mansfield Town on a free transfer on a two-year contract.

== International career ==
Knoyle made three appearances for the England under-18 team between 2013 and 2015.

== Career statistics ==
As of 14 February 2026

Appearances and goals by club, season and competition
Club	Season	League			National cup (Note: Includes FA Cup, Scottish Cup)		League cup (Note: Includes EFL Cup, Scottish League Cup)		Other		Total	
Club	Season	Division	Apps	Goals	Apps	Goals	Apps	Goals	Apps	Goals	Apps	Goals
West Ham United	2015–16	Premier League	0	0	0	0	0	0	1 (Note: Appearance(s) in UEFA Europa League)	0	1	0
Dundee United (loan)	2015–16	Scottish Premiership	9	0	2	0	0	0	—		11	0
Wigan Athletic (loan)	2016–17	Championship	1	0	0	0	0	0	—		1	0
Swindon Town	2017–18	League Two	18	0	0	0	0	0	3 (Note: Appearance(s) in EFL Trophy)	0	21	0
Swindon Town	2018–19	League Two	42	0	2	0	1	0	3	0	48	0
Swindon Town	Total		60	0	2	0	1	0	6	0	69	0
Cambridge United	2019–20	League Two	27	1	2	0	0	0	1	0	30	1
Cambridge United	2020–21	League Two	44	2	1	0	2	0	3	0	50	2
Cambridge United	Total		71	3	3	0	2	0	4	0	80	3
Doncaster Rovers	2021–22	League One	45	1	2	0	2	0	3	0	52	1
Doncaster Rovers	2022–23	League Two	25	1	1	0	1	0	2	0	29	1
Doncaster Rovers	Total		70	2	3	0	3	0	5	0	81	2
Stockport County	2022–23	League Two	23	2	0	0	0	0	3 (Note: Appearance(s) in EFL League Two play-offs)	0	26	2
Stockport County	2023–24	League Two	24	0	3	0	1	0	2	0	30	0
Stockport County	2024–25	League One	23	0	1	0	0	0	1 (Note: Appearance(s) in EFL League One play-offs)	0	25	0
Stockport County	Total		70	2	4	0	1	0	6	0	81	2
Mansfield Town	2025–26	League One	19	0	2	0	1	0	—		22	0
Career total			281	7	14	0	7	0	22	0	324	7

== Honours ==
Stockport County

- EFL League Two: 2023–24

Individual

- EFL League Two Team of the Season: 2020–21
- PFA Team of the Year: 2020–21 League Two
