= Joe Ironside =

English footballer (born 1993)

Personal information
- Full name: Joe Samuel Ironside
- Date of birth: 16 October 1993 (age 33)
- Place of birth: Middlesbrough, England
- Height: 5 ft 11 in (1.80 m)
- Position: Striker

Team information
- Current team: Tranmere Rovers
- Number: 9

Youth career
- –2012: Sheffield United

Senior career*
Years	Team	Apps	(Gls)
2012–2015	Sheffield United	16	(0)
2013–2014	→ FC Halifax Town (loan)	10	(2)
2014	→ Harrogate Town (loan)	8	(0)
2014	→ Alfreton Town (loan)	16	(4)
2014	→ Hartlepool United (loan)	4	(1)
2015–2016	Alfreton Town	30	(2)
2016–2017	Nuneaton Town	44	(16)
2017–2019	Kidderminster Harriers	82	(42)
2018–2019	→ York City (loan)	9	(0)
2019–2020	Macclesfield Town	33	(6)
2020–2023	Cambridge United	125	(34)
2023–2025	Doncaster Rovers	84	(24)
2025–	Tranmere Rovers	37	(5)

International career
2017	England C	2	(0)
- * Club domestic league appearances and goals as of 23:16, 17 May 2026 (UTC)

Joe Samuel Ironside (born 16 October 1993) is an English professional footballer who plays as a striker for EFL League Two club Tranmere Rovers.

Ironside started his career at Sheffield United after progressing through their academy. He spent time on loan at FC Halifax Town, Harrogate Town, Alfreton Town and Hartlepool United before signing for Alfreton in 2015.

== Career ==
=== Sheffield United ===
Ironside came through the academy at Sheffield United. He was in the team that lost the 2011 FA Youth Final against Manchester United, although he scored United's only goal at Old Trafford a 4–1 defeat in the second leg, following a 2–2 draw at Bramall Lane. Ironside made his first-team debut for United on 17 October 2012, appearing as an 89th-minute substitute in a 4–1 away win against Notts County in the Football League Trophy. His first league appearance came on 8 December as an 81st-minute substitute in a 3–1 away win over Carlisle United. After a string of appearances for United, Ironside signed a professional contract of 2 1/2 years with the club in March 2013.

After making six appearances for United at the start of the 2013–14 season, Ironside joined Conference Premier club FC Halifax Town on 12 November 2013 on loan until 5 January 2014. Ironside made his debut for his new club against Hyde the same day, being named in the starting eleven and scoring a goal which was disallowed as offside, before being substituted after 61 minutes. Ironside returned to United after making 11 appearances for FC Halifax, only to be loaned out once more in February 2014, this time to Conference North club Harrogate Town on a one-month loan. Ironside's loan was extended until the end of the season after a successful initial spell, but struggled with injuries during the remainder of his loan, and returned to United in May having played eight matches.

Ironside went on trial with Grimsby Town before joining Conference Premier club Alfreton Town on 16 August 2014 on a one-month loan, making his debut the same day, starting in a 2–0 loss away to Forest Green Rovers. Ironside joined League Two club Hartlepool United on 22 November 2014 on a one-month loan. Hartlepool decided not to extend Ironside's loan on 31 December 2014 and he returned to United having scored once in four appearances for Hartlepool.

=== Non-League ===
Ironside signed for Conference Premier club Alfreton Town permanently on 15 January 2015 on a one-and-a-half-year contract after being released by Sheffield United. He left Alfreton by mutual consent on 5 February 2016 before signing for their National League North rivals Nuneaton Town three days later.

Ironside signed for National League North club Kidderminster Harriers on 21 March 2017 on a contract until June 2019 for a five-figure fee. He joined Kidderminster's National League North rivals York City on 12 November 2018 on loan until 11 January 2019. He was recalled by Kidderminster on 7 January 2019 having made 10 appearances for York without scoring.

=== Macclesfield Town ===
Ironside turned down the offer of a new long-term contract with Kidderminster to sign for League Two club Macclesfield Town on 5 June 2019 on a one-year contract.

=== Cambridge United ===
On 1 August 2020, Ironside joined League Two club Cambridge United signing a two-year deal. He made his debut for the U's in 1–0 win over Birmingham City in the first round of the EFL Cup. A week later he opened his account in the League Two opener against Carlisle United picking up the ball on the edge of the area before sweeping in a shot into the bottom right hand corner.

During the 2020-21 season, Ironside made 44 league appearances, scoring 14 goals, as United gained promotion to League One.

In the 2021–22 FA Cup, Ironside scored the decisive goal in his team's third-round upset of Premier League side Newcastle United.

At the end of the 2022–23 season, Ironside departed Cambridge following the expiration of his contract, after helping the U's dramatically stay up in League One on the final day, following a 2-0 win over Forest Green.

=== Doncaster Rovers ===
On 9 June 2023, Ironside signed for Doncaster Rovers on a three-year contract, having scored 35 goals in 145 games for Cambridge between 2020 and 2023.

Ironside made his competitive debut on 5 August 2023 in a 1 nil home defeat to Harrogate Town in the opening match of the 2023–24 League Two season He then scored his first goal for Doncaster on 15 August 2023 in a 2-2 draw against Mansfield Town.

On 30th August Ironside scored the opening goal against Everton in the second round of the EFL Cup, after he headed in a cross from Tommy Rowe. Everton subsequently came back to win the match 2–1

On 3 February 2024, Doncaster faced fellow relegation-threatened side Sutton United. With Doncaster trailing 1–0, Ironside converted a penalty in the sixth minute of stoppage time to secure a 1–1 draw. The result was important in the context of Doncaster's fight to avoid relegation, as a defeat would have left the club in the relegation zone. This late equaliser proved a turning point in Doncaster's season, as the club subsequently won 13 out of their next 17 matches, including a run of ten consecutive league victories, which moved Doncaster from the lower reaches of the table into contention for the play-offs. On 20 April 2024, with Doncaster's play-off hopes still in the balance, Ironside scored twice in a 4–2 comeback victory over Barrow after Doncaster had fallen 2–0 behind at half-time.

Doncaster finished fifth in League Two and faced Crewe Alexandra in the play-off semi-finals. After the two-legged tie finished level on aggregate, Crewe won 4–3 on penalties, ending Doncaster's hopes of promotion to League One.

Ironside scored 24 goals in 55 appearances.

During the 2024-2025 season, Ironside achieved the League Two title and promotion with Doncaster. Making 49 appearances and scoring 6 goals.

Ironside began the 2025–26 season with Doncaster Rovers following the club's promotion to League One. His involvement was brief, as he made two appearances before leaving the club to Join Tranmere Rovers.

=== Tranmere Rovers ===
On 1 September 2025, Ironside joined EFL League Two club Tranmere Rovers on a three-year deal for an undisclosed fee.

== Personal life ==
Ironside was born in Middlesbrough, North Yorkshire. He is the son of Ian Ironside, a former footballer who played as a goalkeeper.

== Career statistics ==
As of 2 May 2026

Appearances and goals by club, season and competition
Club	Season	League			FA Cup		League Cup		Other		Total	
Club	Season	Division	Apps	Goals	Apps	Goals	Apps	Goals	Apps	Goals	Apps	Goals
Sheffield United	2012–13	League One	12	0	1	0	0	0	4 (Note: Two appearances in Football League Trophy, two in League One play-offs)	0	17	0
Sheffield United	2013–14	League One	4	0	0	0	0	0	2 (Note: Appearances in Football League Trophy)	0	6	0
Sheffield United	2014–15	League One	0	0	0	0	0	0	—		0	0
Sheffield United	Total		16	0	1	0	0	0	6	0	23	0
FC Halifax Town (loan)	2013–14	Conference Premier	10	2	—		—		1 (Note: Appearance(s) in FA Trophy)	0	11	2
Harrogate Town (loan)	2013–14	Conference North	8	0	—		—		—		8	0
Alfreton Town (loan)	2014–15	Conference Premier	16	4	0	0	—		—		16	4
Hartlepool United (loan)	2014–15	League Two	4	1	0	0	—		—		4	1
Alfreton Town	2014–15	Conference Premier	13	0	—		—		—		13	0
Alfreton Town	2015–16	National League North	17	2	2	0	—		1	0	20	2
Alfreton Town	Total		30	2	2	0	—		1	0	33	2
Nuneaton Town	2015–16	National League North	13	2	—		—		—		13	2
Nuneaton Town	2016–17	National League North	31	14	1	1	—		4	3	36	18
Nuneaton Town	Total		44	16	1	1	—		4	3	49	20
Kidderminster Harriers	2016–17	National League North	9	6	—		—		2 (Note: Appearances in National League North play-offs)	0	11	6
Kidderminster Harriers	2017–18	National League North	38	19	4	2	—		6 (Note: Five appearances and two goals in FA Trophy, one appearance in National League North play-offs)	2	48	23
Kidderminster Harriers	2018–19	National League North	35	17	2	2	—		—		37	19
Kidderminster Harriers	Total		82	42	6	4	—		8	2	96	48
York City (loan)	2018–19	National League North	9	0	—		—		1	0	10	0
Macclesfield Town	2019–20	League Two	33	6	0	0	1	0	2 (Note: Appearances in EFL Trophy)	1	36	7
Cambridge United	2020–21	League Two	44	14	0	0	2	0	3	0	49	14
Cambridge United	2021–22	League One	38	14	4	1	2	0	2	0	46	15
Cambridge United	2022–23	League One	43	6	3	0	2	0	2	0	50	6
Cambridge United	Total		81	20	7	1	4	0	4	0	96	21
Doncaster Rovers	2023-24	League Two	45	20	2	1	2	1	6	2	55	24
Doncaster Rovers	2024–25	League Two	39	4	4	0	2	0	4	2	49	6
Doncaster Rovers	2025–26	League One	0	0	0	0	2	0	0	0	2	0
Doncaster Rovers	Total		84	24	6	1	6	1	10	4	104	30
Tranmere Rovers	2025–26	League Two	37	5	1	0	0	0	4	1	42	6
Career total			498	133	24	7	13	1	44	11	577	152

== Honours ==
Sheffield United

- FA Youth Cup runner-up: 2010–11

Cambridge United

- EFL League Two runner-up: 2020–21

Doncaster Rovers

- EFL League Two: 2024–25
