= Declan Drysdale =

English footballer

Personal information
- Full name: Declan Raymond Drysdale
- Date of birth: 14 November 1999 (age 26)
- Place of birth: Birkenhead, England
- Height: 1.96 m (6 ft 5 in)
- Position: Centre back

Team information
- Current team: Marine
- Number: 26

Youth career
- 2017-2019: Tranmere Rovers
- 2019: Coventry City

Senior career*
Years	Team	Apps	(Gls)
2017–2019	Tranmere Rovers	2	(0)
2019–2022	Coventry City	1	(0)
2020	→ Solihull Moors (loan)	3	(0)
2020–2021	→ Gillingham (loan)	10	(0)
2021	→ Cambridge United (loan)	13	(1)
2022	→ Ross County (loan)	5	(0)
2022–2024	Newport County	34	(0)
2024–2025	Tranmere Rovers	6	(0)
2025-	Marine	27	(2)
- * Club domestic league appearances and goals as of 12:50, 26 April 2026 (UTC)

Declan Raymond Drysdale (born 14 November 1999) is an English footballer who plays as a centre back for Marine.

== Career ==
=== Tranmere Rovers ===
Drysdale made his debut for Tranmere Rovers starting on 24 April 2017 in a National League win against Maidstone United.

=== Coventry City ===
On 4 January 2019, Drysdale completed a transfer to League One side Coventry City on a two-and-a-half-year deal. He spent three-and-a-half seasons at the club but only made a handful of first-team appearances. During his first year at Coventry, he featured primarily for the club's under-23 side although he made his first-team debut in an EFL Trophy match with Southampton U23s on 5 November 2019.

Drysdale joined Solihull Moors in January 2020 on a one-month loan deal. Shortly after the start of the 2020–21 season, he joined Gillingham on a season-long loan deal. On 12 January, Drysdale was recalled back to the "Sky Blues". On 1 February 2021 Drysdale joined Cambridge United on loan until the end of the 2020–21 season.

In January 2022, Drysdale joined Ross County on loan the end of the 2021–22 season.

=== Newport County ===
Drysdale joined Newport County for an undisclosed fee on 7 June 2022. He made his debut for Newport on 30 July 2022 in the starting line up for the 1–1 League Two draw against Sutton United. Drysdale was released by Newport County at the end of the 2023-24 season.

=== Tranmere Rovers return ===
In July 2024 Drysdale re-joined Tranmere Rovers on a one-year contract.

On 6 May 2025, the club announced the player would be released in June when his contract expired. He signed for Marine in September 2025.

== Career statistics ==
As of match played 18 April 2023

Appearances and goals by club, season and competition
Club	Season	League			FA Cup		League Cup		Other		Total	
Club	Season	Division	Apps	Goals	Apps	Goals	Apps	Goals	Apps	Goals	Apps	Goals
Tranmere Rovers	2016–17	National League	1	0	0	0	—		0	0	1	0
Tranmere Rovers	2017–18	National League	1	0	0	0	—		0	0	1	0
Tranmere Rovers	2018–19	League Two	0	0	0	0	0	0	0	0	0	0
Tranmere Rovers	Total		2	0	0	0	0	0	0	0	2	0
Coventry City	2018–19	League One	0	0	0	0	0	0	0	0	0	0
Coventry City	2019–20	League One	1	0	0	0	0	0	2 (Note: Appearance(s) in EFL Trophy)	0	3	0
Coventry City	2020–21	Championship	0	0	0	0	2	0	—		2	0
Coventry City	2021–22	Championship	0	0	0	0	1	0	—		1	0
Coventry City	Total		1	0	0	0	3	0	2	0	6	0
Solihull Moors (loan)	2019–20	National League	3	0	0	0	0	0	0	0	3	0
Gillingham (loan)	2020–21	League One	10	0	2	0	0	0	3	0	15	0
Cambridge United (loan)	2020–21	League Two	13	1	0	0	0	0	—		13	1
Ross County (loan)	2021–22	Scottish Premiership	5	0	1	0	0	0	—		6	0
Newport County	2022–23	League Two	22	0	1	0	2	0	4	0	29	0
Career totals			56	1	4	0	5	0	9	0	74	1
