= Football League Third Division Player of the Month =

English football award

The Football League Third Division Player of the Month award was a monthly prize of recognition given to association football players in the Football League Third Division, the fourth tier of English football from 1992 to 2004. The award was announced in the first week of the following month. From the 2004–05 season onwards, following a rebranding exercise by The Football League, the fourth tier was known as Football League Two, thus the award became the Football League Two Player of the Month award.

== Winners ==
- August 2003 - (England) Lee Trundle (Swansea City)
- September 2003 - (England) Jon Stead (Huddersfield Town)
- October 2003 - (Scotland) Michael McIndoe (Doncaster Rovers)
- November 2003 - (England) Peter Beagrie (Scunthorpe United)
- December 2003 - (England) Andy Preece (Carlisle United)
- For results from 2004–05 onwards, see EFL League Two Player of the Month.
