= Paul Mullin =

English footballer (born 1994)

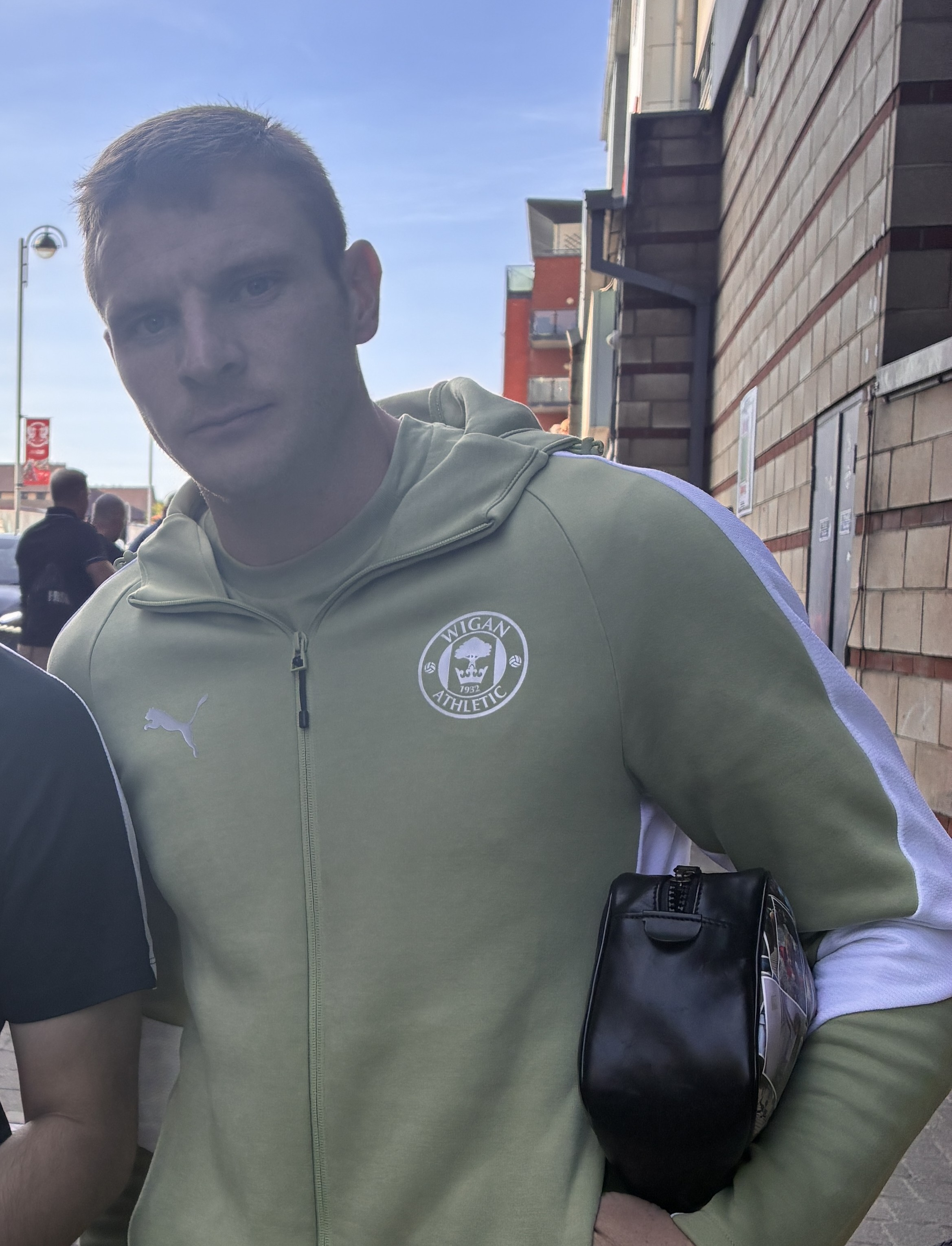
- Mullin with Wigan Athletic in 2025

Personal information
- Full name: Paul Philip Mullin
- Date of birth: 6 November 1994 (age 32)
- Place of birth: Litherland, England
- Height: 5 ft 10 in (1.77 m)
- Position: Forward

Team information
- Current team: Rotherham United
- Number: 10

Youth career
- Everton
- Liverpool
- 2012–2013: Huddersfield Town

Senior career*
Years	Team	Apps	(Gls)
2013–2014	Huddersfield Town	0	(0)
2014	→ Vauxhall Motors (loan)	4	(0)
2014–2017	Morecambe	122	(25)
2017–2018	Swindon Town	40	(6)
2018–2020	Tranmere Rovers	42	(8)
2020	→ Cambridge United (loan)	6	(2)
2020–2021	Cambridge United	46	(32)
2021–2026	Wrexham	148	(91)
2025–2026	→ Wigan Athletic (loan)	20	(4)
2026	→ Bradford City (loan)	14	(0)
2026–	Rotherham United	10	(5)
- * Club domestic league appearances and goals as of 23:23, 10 October 2026 (UTC)

Paul Philip Mullin (born 6 November 1994) is an English professional footballer who plays as a forward for EFL League Two club Rotherham United.

He is a product of the Everton, Liverpool, and Huddersfield Town academies. Born in England, he is eligible to play for Wales through his grandmother.

Mullin was the 2020–21 EFL League Two top scorer with Cambridge United and, having helped to secure their promotion to League One as runners-up, then subsequently moved to Wrexham ahead of the 2021–22 season where he again became top scorer; this time in the National League. In the 2022–23 season, Mullin scored 38 league goals as Wrexham were promoted to League Two as champions. In the 2023–24 season, he was again the team high scorer as Wrexham were promoted to League One.

== Club career ==
Mullin was born in Litherland, Merseyside. He spent time in the academies of both Everton and Liverpool and after a period in the Liverpool Foundation College, he moved to Huddersfield Town.

=== Huddersfield Town ===
Huddersfield Town's youth coach Frankie Bunn invited Mullin to the squad. Subsequently Mullin was signed to Huddersfield Town in 2012 after impressing at U18 and U21 level; he signed a one-year contract at the club. However, at the end of the 2013–14 season, Mullin was released by the club, without ever making a first team appearance.

=== Morecambe ===
After a successful trial period he signed for Morecambe on a short-term contract in August 2014. He made his professional debut coming on as a second-half substitute in the League Cup first round defeat to Bradford City on 12 August 2014. Four days later, on his league debut, Mullin scored his first professional goal after coming on as a second-half substitute in the 3–2 win over Newport County, in which he scored a winning goal. One week later, on 23 August, Mullin made his full debut scoring both goals in a 2–1 win away at Cambridge United. After scoring three goals in his first seven matches, Mullin signed a three-year contract with the club in mid-September. Mullin then went through a barren spell of 11 games without scoring, only finding the net again in a 2–1 loss at Accrington Stanley on 31 October 2014.

=== Swindon Town ===
On 27 June 2017, Mullin joined League Two club Swindon Town for an undisclosed fee. Mullin was well regarded by fans for his hard-working approach but goals were hard to come by; which led to his departure after one season.

=== Tranmere Rovers ===
In June 2018, he signed for Tranmere Rovers. He scored his first goal for Tranmere in a 4–3 EFL Trophy loss against Crewe Alexandra on 4 September 2018.

In January 2020, Tranmere Rovers took Premier League club Watford to an FA Cup third round replay after drawing 3–3 at Vicarage Road, Mullin scored a penalty in the first game and went on to score the winner after coming on as a substitute in the replay at Prenton Park. Tranmere drew Manchester United in the fourth round at home.

=== Cambridge United ===
Mullin signed for Cambridge United on a six-month loan deal on 31 January 2020, and scored his first goal for the club on 11 February 2020, away at Scunthorpe United. He scored again at Leyton Orient on 7 March, the last match before the season was curtailed due to the COVID-19 pandemic.

In July 2020, Mullin signed permanently on a one-year contract. On 20 October 2020, he scored a hat-trick in a 3–1 victory over Port Vale, taking his goal total to 11 in ten matches in all competitions. On 27 March 2021, Mullin scored his 25th league goal of the season in a 2–1 victory over Carlisle United, a goal which saw him break David Crown's record for the most league goals by a Cambridge United player in a season. As a gesture, club partners Mead renamed their stand the "Paul Mullin Stand", a name that would stay in place for the remainder of the 2020–21 season.

In April 2021, Mullin was nominated for the EFL League Two Player of the Season, before being announced as the winner at the EFL Awards on 29 April, where he was also named in the 2020–21 EFL League Two Team of the Season. Mullin was also awarded the League Two Golden boot after scoring 32 goals in Cambridge United's 2020–21 campaign, in which they secured promotion to the third tier of English football, a record number for the division since its rebranding in 2004.

=== Wrexham ===
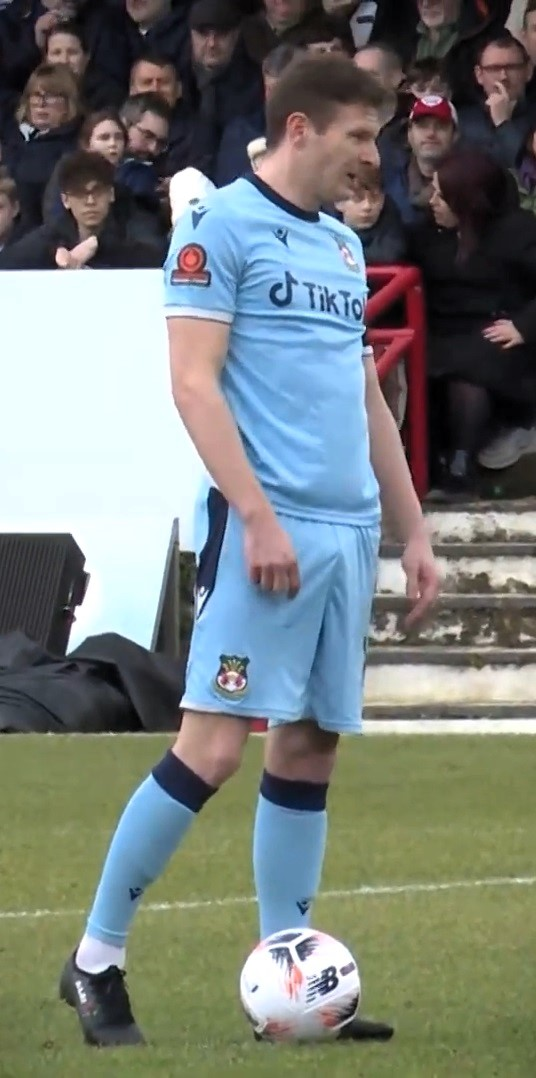
Mullin playing for Wrexham in 2023.

At the end of the 2020–21 season, Mullin rejected a new contract offer with Cambridge United and in July 2021 joined National League side Wrexham on a three-year deal.

==== 2021–22 season: National League Player of the Season and Golden Boot ====
On 19 October, Mullin scored both goals in a 2–0 win over Marine in the fourth qualifying round replay of the 2021–22 FA Cup, thus helping Wrexham reach the cup's first round proper. This brace also meant he had now scored 7 goals in his first 10 games for the club, thus having the best start of any Wrexham player since the club joined the National League in 2008, breaking the previous record held by Jefferson Louis who had scored 6 times in his first 10 appearances in 2009. After scoring three goals across the course of the month, including a vital last-minute winner against FC Halifax Town, Mullin was awarded the league's Player of the Month award for November 2021.

On 2 April 2022, in the semi-finals of the 2021–22 FA Trophy, Mullin scored both goals in a 2–0 win over Stockport County. Both goals came in stoppage time, twice lobbing the goalkeeper, as he helped Wrexham reach their first FA Trophy final since 2015. Mullin continued to have a successful first season at Wrexham, scoring 26 goals in the league campaign to help the club to a second-placed finish, losing the automatic promotion from the National League to Stockport County. Wrexham then lost the 2022 FA Trophy final in Wembley Stadium to Bromley on 22 May, and just six days later, Wrexham lost 5–4 to Grimsby Town in the semi-finals of the promotion play-offs despite Mullin scoring twice. In total, Mullin scored 32 goals in all competitions in his debut season, thus winning Wrexham Men's Team Top Goalscorer, Player of the Season, and Goal of the Season awards as well as the National League's Golden Boot and Player of the Season.

==== 2022–23 season: FA Cup Golden Ball and promotion to the Football League ====
On 20 August 2022, Mullin scored his first hat-trick for Wrexham in a 5–0 home victory against Maidstone United. In October 2022, Mullin posted a picture of his boots on with "F*** the Tories!" printed on the side. The club acted quickly to ban him from wearing the boots, calling the photo an "unwelcome distraction". Later that season, he wore another message on his boots, carrying a dedication to his son Albi who had recently been diagnosed with autism.

On 1 October, Mullin scored a last-minute penalty against Oldham Athletic to seal a 2–1 comeback win for his team, who went top of the league. In the second round of the FA Cup, Mullin scored his second hat-trick for Wrexham in a 4–1 home victory against Farnborough. His first goal was his 50th goal for Wrexham, and his second-half brace saw him reach 20 for the 2022–23 season. In the third round, Mullin converted a second-half penalty against Championship side Coventry City to help secure a 4–3 win to Wrexham, as the club reached the FA Cup fourth round for the first time since 2000. In the fourth round, Wrexham faced Championship club Sheffield United. Mullin scored a late goal to give his side a 3–2 lead, but a last-minute equalizer forced a replay in which Mullin scored a penalty, but also missed one, as Wrexham were knocked-out with a 3–1 loss. Despite being eliminated in the fourth round, the 2022–23 FA Cup ended with Mullin as its top scorer with 9 goals (including one in the qualifying rounds), and he was thus the winner of the Golden Ball Award, which he collected in Wembley after the final ended. He was also selected to the FA Cup Team of the Season.

On 4 March, Mullin scored both goals in a 2–2 draw with Maidenhead United, a result that saw Wrexham return to the top of the National League, one point clear of Notts County. On 10 April, Mullin scored a goal in an eventual 3–2 win over league rivals Notts County, which helped his club to go three points clear of Notts County in the National League title race. On 22 April 2023, he scored two goals in a 3–1 home victory over Boreham Wood to clinch promotion to League Two. He finished as the league's second highest top scorer with 38 goals behind Notts County's Macaulay Langstaff, who set a National League division record of 42 goals. Mullin was named as the club's Player of the Season for the second consecutive season.

On 15 May, Wrexham extended Mullin's contract, keeping him at the club until the summer of 2026.

==== 2023–25 seasons: Pre-season injuries and back-to-back-to-back promotions ====
On 25 July, in the third match of Wrexham's pre-season US tour, Mullin had a violent mid-air collision with Manchester United's goalkeeper, Nathan Bishop, after which he was walked off the field with assistance while wearing an oxygen mask and was later hospitalized with broken ribs and a punctured lung, thus missing the start of the season. Unlike the rest of the squad, Mullin stayed in the United States to allow time for his lung to heal, starting non-contact training in late August. On 9 September, Mullin made his first appearance since his injury when he came off the bench in a 2–1 victory over Doncaster Rovers, and in the following week, on 16 September, he started against Grimsby Town in a 3–0 victory. Mullin scored his first goals of the regular season with a brace against Crewe Alexandra on 30 September, resulting in a 3–3 draw. On 25 November, he achieved a hat-trick over his former club Morecambe in a 6–0 victory.

On 1 January 2024, Mullin signed a contract extension with Wrexham, keeping him there until the end of the 2026–27 season. On 2 March, Mullin converted his first hat-trick of the year and second of the season in a 4–0 win over Accrington Stanley with all goals being scored in the first half. He continued his impressive goalscoring form across the remainder of March, scoring seven goals and registering two assists in six matches, winning the League Two Player of the Month award for a second time in his career. He achieved his 100th goal for Wrexham on 6 April 2024 in a win against Colchester United. On 13 April, he scored two goals in a 6–0 home victory over Forest Green Rovers which clinched promotion to League One.

Mullin had spinal surgery in June to help with a "long-term lower back/hamstring issue", which caused him to miss the start of the season. On 10 September, he returned from injury and scored his first goal of the season in a 3–0 EFL Trophy group-stage victory over Salford City and celebrated the goal by putting on a Deadpool mask in reference to his cameo in the superhero movie Deadpool & Wolverine. Whilst Wrexham achieved a historic third consecutive promotion, taking them to the EFL Championship, Mullin saw a drastic dip in form, only scoring five goals all season. He was frozen out of the first team from February onwards, with Phil Parkinson preferring Steven Fletcher, Jack Marriott, and Sam Smith. Mullin's last appearance of the season came in a defeat to Peterborough United in the EFL Trophy on 26 February, during which he missed a penalty in the shootout.

==== 2025–26 season: Loans back to League One with Wigan Athletic and Bradford City ====
On 23 June, Mullin was loaned to League One side Wigan Athletic for the 2025–26 season, following Wrexham's promotion to the EFL Championship. On 5 January 2026, Wigan terminated Mullin's loan. On 30 January, he returned to League One, joining Bradford City on loan for the remainder of the season. On 26 June, it was announced that Paul Mullin would depart Wrexham by mutual consent.

=== Rotherham United ===
On 29 July 2026, Mullin signed a two-year contract with League Two club Rotherham United.

== International career ==
Born in England, Mullin is eligible to play for the Wales national team through a grandmother. Mullin was placed on the standby list for the Wales national team for their October 2023 fixtures against Gibraltar and Croatia.

== Personal life ==
Mullin began to raise awareness for autism after his son, born in 2019, was diagnosed with it and became a patron for the autism charity YourSpace in March 2023. He released the memoir My Wrexham Story in November 2023 through Penguin Books.

He appeared in a non-speaking cameo role in the superhero movie Deadpool & Wolverine as Welshpool, a Welsh version of Deadpool. His costume was put on permanent display at the club's hospitality suite.

== Career statistics ==
As of match played 5 September 2026

Appearances and goals by club, season and competition
Club	Season	League			FA Cup		League Cup		Other		Total	
Club	Season	Division	Apps	Goals	Apps	Goals	Apps	Goals	Apps	Goals	Apps	Goals
Huddersfield Town	2013–14	Championship	0	0	0	0	0	0	—		0	0
Vauxhall Motors (loan)	2013–14	Conference North	4	0	0	0	—		0	0	4	0
Morecambe	2014–15	League Two	42	8	1	0	1	0	2 (Note: Appearances in Football League Trophy)	0	46	8
Morecambe	2015–16	League Two	40	9	2	0	1	0	4	1	47	10
Morecambe	2016–17	League Two	40	8	2	0	2	0	3 (Note: Appearance(s) in EFL Trophy)	2	47	10
Morecambe	Total		122	25	5	0	4	0	9	3	140	28
Swindon Town	2017–18	League Two	40	6	2	1	1	1	4	2	47	10
Tranmere Rovers	2018–19	League Two	22	5	5	1	1	0	1	1	29	7
Tranmere Rovers	2019–20	League One	20	3	4	2	1	0	2	0	27	5
Tranmere Rovers	Total		42	8	9	3	2	0	3	1	56	12
Cambridge United (loan)	2019–20	League Two	6	2	—		—		0	0	6	2
Cambridge United	2020–21	League Two	46	32	0	0	2	0	2	2	50	34
Cambridge United	Total		52	34	0	0	2	0	2	2	56	36
Wrexham	2021–22	National League	38	26	2	2	—		4 (Note: Three appearances and two goals in FA Trophy, one appearance and two goals in National League play-offs)	4	44	32
Wrexham	2022–23	National League	46	38	7	9	—		0	0	53	47
Wrexham	2023–24	League Two	38	24	4	1	0	0	1	1	43	26
Wrexham	2024–25	League One	26	3	1	0	0	0	5	2	32	5
Wrexham	2025–26	Championship	0	0	—		—		—		0	0
Wrexham	Total		148	91	14	12	0	0	10	7	172	110
Wigan Athletic (loan)	2025–26	League One	20	4	2	0	3	1	1	0	26	5
Bradford City (loan)	2025–26	League One	9	0	—		—		0	0	9	0
Rotherham United	2026–27	League Two	5	1	0	0	1	0	0	0	6	1
Career total			442	169	32	16	13	2	29	15	516	202

== Honours ==
Tranmere Rovers

- EFL League Two play-offs: 2019

Cambridge United

- EFL League Two second-place promotion: 2020–21

Wrexham

- EFL League One second-place promotion: 2024-25
- EFL League Two second-place promotion: 2023–24
- National League: 2022–23
- FA Trophy runner-up: 2021–22

Individual

- EFL League Two Player of the Month: October 2020, November 2021, March 2024
- EFL League Two Player of the Year: 2020–21
- EFL League Two Top Scorer: 2020–21
- EFL League Two Team of the Season: 2020–21
- PFA Team of the Year: 2020–21 League Two, 2023–24 League Two
- Cambridge United Player of the Season: 2020–21
- National League Top Scorer: 2021–22
- National League Player of the Season: 2021–22
- National League Team of the Season: 2021–22, 2022–23
- Wrexham Player of the Season: 2021–22, 2022–23, 2023–24
- FA Cup Golden Ball: 2022–23

== Filmography ==
Year	Title	Role	Notes	Refs.
2024	Deadpool & Wolverine	Welshpool	Cameo appearance	
2021-2026	Welcome to Wrexham	Wrexham AFC player	Main Role	
