= 2020–21 EFL League Two =

EFL League Two
- Season: 2020–21
- Dates: 12 September 2020 – 8 May 2021
- Champions: Cheltenham Town
- Promoted: Cheltenham Town; Cambridge United; Bolton Wanderers; Morecambe
- Relegated: Southend United; Grimsby Town
- Matches: 552
- Goals: 1,303 (2.36 per match)
- Top goalscorer: Paul Mullin (32 goals)
- Biggest home win: Tranmere Rovers 5–0 Grimsby Town (21 November 2020); Exeter City 6–1 Colchester United (24 November 2020); Exeter City 5–0 Tranmere Rovers (12 December 2020)
- Biggest away win: Morecambe 0–5 Cambridge United (19 September 2020) Scunthorpe United 0–5 Cambridge United (17 October 2020)
- Highest scoring: Bolton Wanderers 3–6 Port Vale (5 December 2020) Harrogate Town 5–4 Cambridge United (30 April 2021)
- Longest winning run: Bolton Wanderers; Port Vale (6 games)
- Longest unbeaten run: Bolton Wanderers (14 games)
- Longest winless run: Colchester United; Walsall (14 games)
- Longest losing run: Southend United (6 games)

The 2020–21 EFL League Two (referred to as the Sky Bet League Two for sponsorship reasons) was the 17th season of Football League Two under its current title and the 29th season under its current league division format.

== Team changes ==
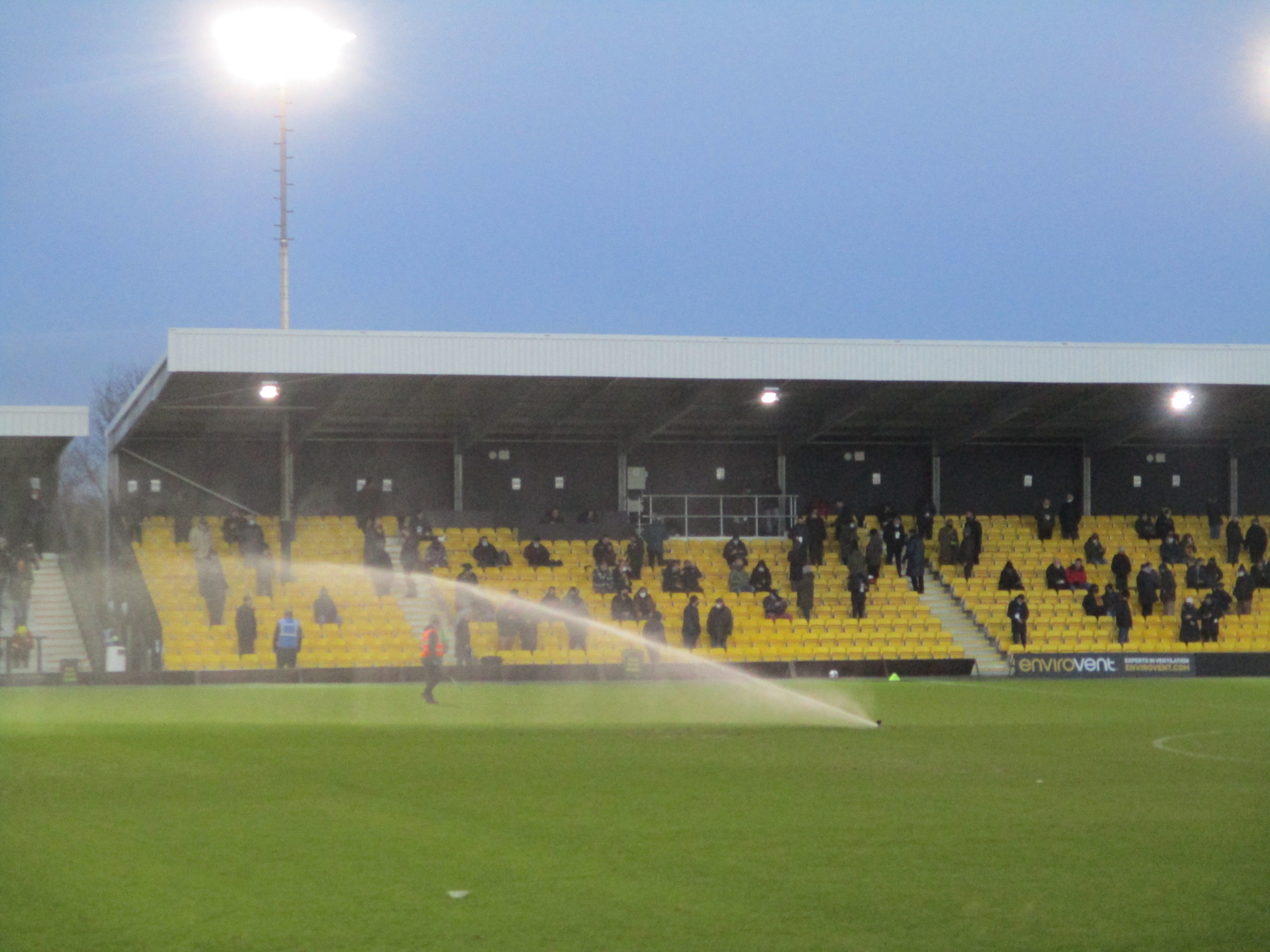
A socially distanced crowd at Wetherby Road in December 2020.

The following teams have changed divisions since the 2019–20 season.

=== To League Two ===
Promoted from National League

- Barrow
- Harrogate Town

Relegated from League One

- Tranmere Rovers
- Southend United
- Bolton Wanderers

=== From League Two ===
Promoted to League One

- Swindon Town
- Crewe Alexandra
- Plymouth Argyle
- Northampton Town

Relegated to National League

- Macclesfield Town (Note: Stevenage originally finished 24th in the 2019–20 EFL League Two table, but after 17 points were deducted against Macclesfield Town, Macclesfield slipped to 24th, and Stevenage were granted a reprieve from relegation.)

== Stadiums ==
Locations of the 2020–21 EFL League Two teams
Greater Manchester League Two football clubs

Team	Location	Stadium	Capacity
Barrow	Barrow-in-Furness	Holker Street	5,045
Bolton Wanderers	Bolton	University of Bolton Stadium	28,723
Bradford City	Bradford	Valley Parade	25,136
Cambridge United	Cambridge	Abbey Stadium	8,127
Carlisle United	Carlisle	Brunton Park	18,202
Cheltenham Town	Cheltenham	Whaddon Road	7,066
Colchester United	Colchester	Colchester Community Stadium	10,105
Crawley Town	Crawley	Broadfield Stadium	5,996
Exeter City	Exeter	St. James Park	8,696
Forest Green Rovers	Nailsworth	The New Lawn	5,147
Grimsby Town	Cleethorpes	Blundell Park	9,052
Harrogate Town	Harrogate	Wetherby Road (Note: Harrogate Town began the season at the Keepmoat Stadium in Doncaster.)	5,000
Leyton Orient	London (Leyton)	Brisbane Road	9,271
Mansfield Town	Mansfield	Field Mill	10,000
Morecambe	Morecambe	Globe Arena	6,476
Newport County	Newport	Rodney Parade	7,850
Oldham Athletic	Oldham	Boundary Park	13,512
Port Vale	Burslem	Vale Park	19,052
Salford City	Salford	Moor Lane	5,108
Scunthorpe United	Scunthorpe	Glanford Park	9,088
Southend United	Southend-on-Sea	Roots Hall	12,392
Stevenage	Stevenage	Broadhall Way	7,300
Tranmere Rovers	Birkenhead	Prenton Park	16,789
Walsall	Walsall	Bescot Stadium	11,300

== Personnel and sponsoring ==
Team	Manager	Captain	Kit manufacturer	Sponsor
Barrow	(England) Rob Kelly (caretaker)	(England) Jason Taylor	Joma	JF Hornby & Co.
Bolton Wanderers	(England) Ian Evatt	(England) Antoni Sarcevic	Macron	Home Bargains
Bradford City	(England) Mark Trueman and (England) Conor Sellars	(England) Richard O'Donnell	Avec Sport	JCT600
Cambridge United	(England) Mark Bonner	(England) Greg Taylor	Hummel	Mick George
Carlisle United	(England) Chris Beech	(England) Nick Anderton	Erreà	Edinburgh Woollen Mill
Cheltenham Town	(Northern Ireland) Michael Duff	(England) Ben Tozer	Erreà	Mira Showers
Colchester United	(England) Hayden Mullins (caretaker)	(England) Harry Pell	Macron	Texo Scaffolding (Home); JobServe (Away / Third)
Crawley Town	(England) John Yems	(England) George Francomb	Erreà	The People's Pension
Exeter City	(England) Matt Taylor	(Wales) Jake Taylor	Joma	Carpetright
Forest Green Rovers	(England) Jimmy Ball (caretaker)	(England) Chris Stokes	PlayerLayer	Ecotricity
Grimsby Town	(England) Paul Hurst	(Republic of Ireland) James McKeown	Erreà	Young's Seafood
Harrogate Town	(England) Simon Weaver	(England) Josh Falkingham	New Balance	Strata
Leyton Orient	(Jamaica) Jobi McAnuff (caretaker)	(Jamaica) Jobi McAnuff	New Balance	Multiple charities (Note: Tottenham Hotspur player Harry Kane, who played for Leyton Orient early in his career, bought the club's shirt sponsorship for the 2020–21 season. Each of the team's shirts will feature a different message or charity chosen by Kane: "Thank You Frontline Workers" (home shirt), Haven House Children's Hospice (away shirt), and Mind (third shirt).)
Mansfield Town	(England) Nigel Clough	(England) Ollie Clarke	Surridge	One Call
Morecambe	(Scotland) Derek Adams	(Scotland) Sam Lavelle	Macron	Annapurna Recruitment
Newport County	(Wales) Michael Flynn	(England) Joss Labadie	Hummel	Home: Alzheimer's Society Cymru; Away: PureVans; Third: ExilesPicks
Oldham Athletic	(England) Keith Curle	(England) Carl Piergianni	Hummel	Wakelet
Port Vale	(England) Darrell Clarke	(England) Tom Conlon	Erreà	Synectics Solutions
Salford City	(England) Gary Bowyer	(England) Ashley Eastham	Kappa	TalkTalk
Scunthorpe United	(England) Neil Cox	(England) Jordan Clarke	Macron	Utilita Energy
Southend United	(England) Phil Brown	(England) John White	Hummel	Watchlotto
Stevenage	(England) Alex Revell	(Scotland) Scott Cuthbert	Macron	Burger King
Tranmere Rovers	(England) Ian Dawes (caretaker)	(England) Scott Davies	Puma	Essar
Walsall	(England) Brian Dutton	(England) James Clarke	Erreà	HomeServe

== Managerial changes ==
Team	Outgoing manager	Manner of departure	Date of vacancy	Position in table	Incoming manager	Date of appointment
Bolton Wanderers	(England) Keith Hill	End of contract	12 June 2020	Pre-season	(England) Ian Evatt	1 July 2020
Southend United	(England) Sol Campbell	Mutual consent	30 June 2020	Pre-season	(England) Mark Molesley	13 August 2020
Barrow	(England) Ian Evatt	Signed by Bolton Wanderers	1 July 2020	Pre-season	(England) David Dunn	9 July 2020
Tranmere Rovers	(Scotland) Micky Mellon	Signed by Dundee United	6 July 2020	Pre-season	(England) Mike Jackson	18 July 2020
Colchester United	(England) John McGreal	Sacked	14 July 2020	Pre-season	(England) Steve Ball	28 July 2020
Oldham Athletic	(Tunisia) Dino Maamria	Sacked	31 July 2020	Pre-season	(Australia) Harry Kewell	1 August 2020
Scunthorpe United	(England) Russ Wilcox	End of caretaker spell	7 August 2020	Pre-season	(England) Neil Cox	7 August 2020
Salford City	(Scotland) Graham Alexander	Sacked	12 October 2020	5th	(England) Richie Wellens	4 November 2020
Mansfield Town	(Republic of Ireland) Graham Coughlan	Sacked	27 October 2020	22nd	(England) Nigel Clough	6 November 2020
Tranmere Rovers	(England) Mike Jackson	Sacked	31 October 2020	18th	(England) Keith Hill	21 November 2020
Bradford City	(Scotland) Stuart McCall	Sacked	13 December 2020	22nd	(England) Mark Trueman (England) Conor Sellars	22 February 2021
Barrow	(England) David Dunn	Sacked	13 December 2020	21st	(England) Michael Jolley	23 December 2020
Grimsby Town	(England) Ian Holloway	Resigned	23 December 2020	20th	(England) Paul Hurst	30 December 2020
Port Vale	(England) John Askey	Sacked	4 January 2021	17th	(England) Darrell Clarke	15 February 2021
Walsall	(England) Darrell Clarke	Signed by Port Vale	15 February 2021	11th	(England) Brian Dutton	15 February 2021
Barrow	(England) Michael Jolley	Sacked	21 February 2021	23rd	(England) Rob Kelly (Caretaker)	21 February 2021
Colchester United	(England) Steve Ball	Sacked	24 February 2021	21st	(England) Wayne Brown (Caretaker)	24 February 2021
Leyton Orient	(England) Ross Embleton	Sacked	27 February 2021	14th	(Jamaica) Jobi McAnuff (Caretaker)	28 February 2021
Oldham Athletic	(Australia) Harry Kewell	Sacked	7 March 2021	16th	(England) Keith Curle	8 March 2021
Salford City	(England) Richie Wellens	Mutual consent	22 March 2021	9th	(England) Gary Bowyer	23 March 2021
Colchester United	(England) Wayne Brown (Caretaker)	End of caretaker spell	31 March 2021	21st	(England) Hayden Mullins (Caretaker)	31 March 2021
Southend United	(England) Mark Molesley	Mutual consent	9 April 2021	23rd	(England) Phil Brown	9 April 2021
Forest Green Rovers	(England) Mark Cooper	Sacked	11 April 2021	6th	(England) Jimmy Ball (interim)	11 April 2021
Tranmere Rovers	(England) Keith Hill	Sacked	11 May 2021	7th	(England) Ian Dawes (caretaker)	11 May 2021

== League table ==
Pos	Team	Pld	W	D	L	GF	GA	GD	Pts	Promotion, qualification or relegation
1	Cheltenham Town (C, P)	46	24	10	12	61	39	+22	82	Promotion to the EFL League One
2	Cambridge United (P)	46	24	8	14	73	49	+24	80	Promotion to the EFL League One
3	Bolton Wanderers (P)	46	23	10	13	59	50	+9	79	Promotion to the EFL League One
4	Morecambe (O, P)	46	23	9	14	69	58	+11	78	Qualification for League Two play-offs
5	Newport County	46	20	13	13	57	42	+15	73	Qualification for League Two play-offs
6	Forest Green Rovers	46	20	13	13	59	51	+8	73	Qualification for League Two play-offs
7	Tranmere Rovers	46	20	13	13	55	50	+5	73	Qualification for League Two play-offs
8	Salford City	46	19	14	13	54	34	+20	71	
9	Exeter City	46	18	16	12	71	50	+21	70	
10	Carlisle United	46	18	12	16	60	51	+9	66	
11	Leyton Orient	46	17	10	19	53	55	−2	61	
12	Crawley Town	46	16	13	17	56	62	−6	61	
13	Port Vale	46	17	9	20	57	57	0	60	
14	Stevenage	46	14	18	14	41	41	0	60	
15	Bradford City	46	16	11	19	48	53	−5	59	
16	Mansfield Town	46	13	19	14	57	55	+2	58	
17	Harrogate Town	46	16	9	21	52	61	−9	57	
18	Oldham Athletic	46	15	9	22	72	81	−9	54	
19	Walsall	46	11	20	15	45	53	−8	53	
20	Colchester United	46	11	18	17	44	61	−17	51	
21	Barrow	46	13	11	22	53	59	−6	50	
22	Scunthorpe United	46	13	9	24	41	64	−23	48	
23	Southend United (R)	46	10	15	21	29	58	−29	45	Relegation to National League
24	Grimsby Town (R)	46	10	13	23	37	69	−32	43	Relegation to National League

Updated to match(es) played on 31 May 2021. Source: EFL Official Website
Rules for classification: 1) Points; 2) Goal difference; 3) Number of goals scored; 4) Head-to-head results; 5) Wins; 6) Away goals; 7) Penalty points (sec 9.5); 8) 12-point sending off offences
(C) Champions; (O) Play-off winners; (P) Promoted; (R) Relegated

== Play-offs ==
Semi-finals
4	Morecambe	2	1	3
7	Tranmere Rovers	1	1	2
5	Newport County	2	3	5
6	Forest Green Rovers	0	4	4

Final
4	Morecambe	1
5	Newport County	0

First leg

18 May 2021
20:15

Newport County	2–0	Forest Green Rovers
Dolan 31'; Lewis Collins 56'	Report

Rodney Parade, Newport
Attendance: 900
Referee: Charles Breakspear
20 May 2021
18:00

Tranmere Rovers	1–2	Morecambe
Clarke 19'	Report	Knight-Percival 15'; McAlinden 45+1'

Prenton Park, Tranmere
Referee: Darren Drysdale

Second leg

23 May 2021
12:30

Morecambe	1–1	Tranmere Rovers
Wildig 9'	Report	Vaughan 53'

Mazuma Stadium, Morecambe
Referee: Thomas Bramall
23 May 2021
18:30

Forest Green Rovers	4–3 (a.e.t.)	Newport County
Adams 7'; Aaron Collins 8'; Cadden 53'; Matt 87'	Report	Ellison 70'; Labadie 77'; Maynard 119'

New Lawn, Nailsworth
Attendance: 1,300
Referee: Martin Coy

Final

31 May 2021
15:00 BST

Morecambe	1–0 (a.e.t.)	Newport County
Mendes Gomes 107' (pen.)	Report

Wembley Stadium, London
Attendance: 9,083
Referee: Bobby Madley

== Results ==
Home \ Away	BRW	BOL	BRA	CAM	CAR	CHE	COL	CRA	EXE	FOR	GRI	HAR	LEY	MAN	MOR	NEW	OLD	POR	SAL	SCU	SOU	STE	TRA	WAL
Barrow	—	3–3	1–0	0–2	2–2	3–0	1–1	3–2	2–1	2–2	0–1	0–1	1–1	2–0	1–2	2–1	3–4	0–2	0–1	1–0	1–2	1–1	1–1	2–2
Bolton Wanderers	1–0	—	1–0	2–1	1–0	1–1	0–0	0–1	1–2	0–1	0–0	2–1	2–0	1–1	1–1	0–2	1–2	3–6	2–0	2–0	3–0	1–0	0–3	2–1
Bradford City	2–1	1–1	—	1–0	0–1	1–2	0–0	0–2	2–2	4–1	1–0	0–1	1–0	1–0	2–1	0–3	0–0	0–0	0–1	0–0	3–0	2–1	0–1	1–1
Cambridge United	1–1	1–1	0–0	—	3–0	0–1	2–1	3–1	1–4	1–0	3–0	2–1	2–1	0–1	2–1	2–1	1–2	3–1	2–1	0–1	0–0	0–1	0–0	1–0
Carlisle United	1–0	3–3	3–1	1–2	—	1–2	3–2	2–0	1–0	1–2	1–1	1–1	0–1	1–0	3–1	3–2	1–3	0–0	2–1	2–0	2–0	4–0	2–3	0–0
Cheltenham Town	0–2	0–1	0–2	1–1	1–1	—	1–0	2–0	5–3	2–1	1–3	4–1	1–0	0–0	1–2	1–1	2–0	3–2	2–0	1–0	1–0	1–1	4–0	3–0
Colchester United	1–1	2–0	1–2	1–1	2–1	0–0	—	1–1	1–2	1–0	2–1	2–1	2–1	2–2	1–2	0–2	3–3	0–1	1–0	0–1	2–0	3–1	2–2	2–1
Crawley Town	4–2	1–4	1–1	2–1	0–3	1–0	1–0	—	2–0	0–0	1–2	1–3	0–0	1–0	4–0	1–1	1–4	1–3	1–0	1–0	1–1	0–1	4–0	1–1
Exeter City	1–1	1–1	3–2	2–0	1–0	0–1	6–1	2–1	—	1–1	3–2	1–2	4–0	0–0	0–2	0–0	1–2	0–2	1–0	3–1	0–0	3–1	5–0	0–0
Forest Green Rovers	0–2	0–1	2–2	2–0	1–0	0–0	3–0	1–2	0–0	—	1–0	2–1	2–1	1–2	2–2	1–1	4–3	1–1	0–2	3–2	1–3	1–0	2–1	1–1
Grimsby Town	1–0	2–1	1–2	1–2	1–1	1–1	0–0	2–1	1–4	1–2	—	1–2	0–1	1–1	0–3	0–2	0–0	1–0	0–4	1–0	0–0	1–2	0–0	1–1
Harrogate Town	1–0	1–2	2–1	5–4	1–0	0–1	3–0	1–1	0–0	0–1	1–0	—	2–2	1–0	0–1	2–1	0–3	0–2	0–1	2–5	0–1	0–0	0–1	2–2
Leyton Orient	2–0	4–0	1–0	2–4	2–3	0–2	0–0	1–2	1–1	0–1	2–3	3–0	—	2–2	2–0	2–1	2–1	1–1	1–0	1–1	2–0	0–0	1–3	0–0
Mansfield Town	2–4	2–3	1–3	0–3	1–1	3–1	1–1	3–3	1–2	0–0	2–2	0–1	0–2	—	1–0	1–1	4–1	4–0	2–1	3–0	1–1	0–0	0–0	1–1
Morecambe	1–0	0–1	2–0	0–5	3–1	1–0	3–0	3–1	2–2	1–2	3–1	1–0	2–1	1–1	—	1–3	4–3	1–0	2–1	4–1	1–1	1–1	0–1	1–1
Newport County	2–1	1–0	2–1	0–1	0–0	1–0	2–1	2–0	1–1	0–2	1–0	2–1	0–1	2–1	2–1	—	2–4	1–0	0–0	4–0	0–1	0–0	1–0	1–1
Oldham Athletic	0–1	0–2	3–1	2–4	1–1	2–1	5–2	2–3	2–1	0–3	1–2	1–2	0–1	2–3	2–3	3–2	—	1–2	2–1	0–2	0–0	0–1	0–1	2–3
Port Vale	0–2	0–1	2–1	0–1	0–1	2–1	1–1	2–0	1–0	1–1	3–0	0–0	2–3	0–3	1–0	2–1	0–0	—	1–0	0–1	5–1	0–0	3–4	1–3
Salford City	1–0	0–1	3–0	4–1	1–1	0–0	0–0	1–1	2–2	0–0	1–1	2–2	3–0	2–0	2–1	1–1	2–0	1–0	—	1–1	3–0	2–1	2–2	2–0
Scunthorpe United	2–1	0–1	2–0	0–5	1–0	0–2	0–1	0–0	0–2	1–4	3–0	3–1	2–0	2–3	1–1	1–1	1–1	2–0	0–1	—	1–1	0–1	0–0	0–2
Southend United	1–0	0–1	1–3	1–2	0–2	0–2	2–0	0–0	2–2	0–1	3–1	0–4	2–1	0–1	1–2	1–1	1–2	0–2	0–0	1–0	—	0–0	0–2	0–0
Stevenage	2–1	1–2	1–1	1–0	3–1	0–1	0–0	3–3	0–1	3–0	0–0	1–0	0–2	0–1	2–2	0–1	3–0	2–1	0–1	3–1	0–0	—	0–0	1–1
Tranmere Rovers	1–0	2–1	0–1	1–1	1–0	0–3	0–0	0–1	2–1	3–2	5–0	3–2	0–1	1–1	0–1	1–0	2–2	3–1	0–0	2–0	2–0	0–1	—	1–3
Walsall	0–1	2–1	1–2	0–2	0–2	1–2	1–1	1–0	0–0	2–1	1–0	0–0	2–1	1–1	0–2	0–1	1–1	4–3	0–2	1–2	0–1	1–1	1–0	—

Updated to match(es) played on 8 May 2021. Source:
Legend: Blue = home team win; Yellow = draw; Red = away team win.
For upcoming matches, an "a" indicates there is an article about the rivalry between the two participants.

== Season statistics ==
=== Top scorers ===
As of 8 May 2021

Rank	Player	Club	Goals
1	(England) Paul Mullin	Cambridge United	32
2	(Republic of Ireland) Eoin Doyle	Bolton Wanderers	19
3	(England) Matt Jay	Exeter City	18
3	(England) James Vaughan	Tranmere Rovers	18
5	(England) Ian Henderson	Salford City	17
5	(England) Danny Johnson	Leyton Orient	17
5	(England) Conor McAleny	Oldham Athletic	17
8	(Jamaica) Jamille Matt	Forest Green Rovers	16
9	(Guinea-Bissau) Carlos Mendes Gomes	Morecambe	15
9	(England) Jack Muldoon	Harrogate Town	15
9	(England) Scott Quigley	Barrow	15

=== Hat-tricks ===
Player	For	Against	Result	Date	Ref
(England) Paul Mullin	Cambridge United	Morecambe	5–0	19 September 2020	
(England) Ian Henderson	Salford City	Grimsby Town	4–0	19 September 2020	
(Jamaica) Jamille Matt	Forest Green Rovers	Scunthorpe United	4–1	10 October 2020	
(England) Paul Mullin	Cambridge United	Port Vale	3–1	20 October 2020	
(Jamaica) Jevani Brown	Colchester United	Stevenage	3–1	3 November 2020	
(England) Danny Johnson	Leyton Orient	Harrogate Town	3–0	21 November 2020	
(England) Ryan Bowman	Exeter City	Colchester United	6–1	24 November 2020	
(England) Ryan Bowman	Exeter City	Tranmere Rovers	5–0	12 December 2020	
(England) Max Watters	Crawley Town	Barrow	4–2	12 December 2020	
(Saint Kitts and Nevis) Jordan Bowery	Mansfield Town	Port Vale	4–0	2 January 2021	
(England) Matt Jay	Exeter City	Leyton Orient	4–0	6 March 2021	
(England) Brendan Kiernan	Harrogate Town	Cambridge United	5–4	30 April 2021	

== Awards ==
Award	Winner	Club
Player of the Season	(England) Paul Mullin	Cambridge United

EFL League Two Team of the season

Pos.	Player	Club	Ref.
GK	(Czech Republic) Václav Hladký	Salford City	
DF	(England) Kyle Knoyle	Cambridge United	
DF	(England) Will Boyle	Cheltenham Town	
DF	(England) Jordan Tunnicliffe	Crawley Town	
DF	(The Gambia) Ibou Touray	Salford City	
MF	(England) David Worrall	Port Vale	
MF	(England) Antoni Sarcevic	Bolton Wanderers	
MF	(Republic of Ireland) Wes Hoolahan	Cambridge United	
MF	(England) Chris Hussey	Cheltenham Town	
FW	(England) Matt Jay	Exeter City	
FW	(England) Paul Mullin	Cambridge United	
Manager	(Northern Ireland) Michael Duff	Cheltenham Town	
