= 2021–22 Cambridge United F.C. season =

Cambridge United
2021–22 season
- Owners: Paul Barry (70%), Mark Green (20%), Adam Webb (10%)
- Head Coach: Mark Bonner
- Stadium: Abbey Stadium
- League One: 14th
- FA Cup: Fourth round (eliminated by Luton Town)
- EFL Cup: Second round (eliminated by Millwall)
- EFL Trophy: Quarter-finals (eliminated by Rotherham United)
- Top goalscorer: League: Sam Smith (15); All: Sam Smith (21)
- Biggest win: 0–5 vs Cheltenham Town (A), (7 December 2021); EFL League One
- Biggest defeat: 6–0 vs Sheffield Wednesday (A), (12 March 2022); EFL League One
| Home colours | Away colours | Third colours |

The 2021–22 season is Cambridge United's 110th year in their history, and first season back in the third tier since the 2001–02 season, following promotion last season. Along with the league, the club will also compete in the FA Cup, the EFL Cup and the EFL Trophy. The season covers the period from 1 July 2021 to 30 June 2022.

== Pre-season ==
Cambridge United announced they would have friendlies against Cardiff City, Newmarket Town, Brentford XI, Queens Park Rangers, AFC Sudbury and Northampton Town as part of their pre-season preparations.

| 17 July 2021 Friendly | Cardiff City | 0–2 | Cambridge United | Leckwith |
| 13:00 BST | | Report | Smith 4'; Weir 56' | Stadium: Cardiff International Sports Stadium |

| 17 July 2021 Friendly | Cardiff City | 1–1 | Cambridge United | Leckwith |
| 14:30 BST | Zimba 12' | Report | Ironside 1' | Stadium: Cardiff International Sports Stadium |

| 20 July 2021 Friendly | Newmarket Town | 2–2 | Cambridge United XI | Newmarket |
| 19:00 BST | | Report | Yearn; Njoku | Stadium: Cricket Field Road |

| 23 July 2021 Friendly | Cambridge United | 1–3 | Brentford XI | St Neots |
| 18:30 BST | Knibbs (?) | Report | Trevitt 21'; Adams 33' (pen.); Trailist 36' | Stadium: The Premier Plus Stadium; Attendance: 726 |

| 27 July 2021 Friendly | Cambridge United | 1–2 | Queens Park Rangers | Cambridge |
| 19:00 BST | May 86' | Report | Dykes (penalty missed) 7', 39'; Chair 32' | Stadium: Abbey Stadium; Attendance: 3,158 |
Note: Harrison Dunk testimonial

| 28 July 2021 Friendly | AFC Sudbury | 2–2 | Cambridge United XI | Sudbury |
| TBC BST | | Report | | Stadium: King's Marsh |

| 31 July 2021 Friendly | Cambridge United | 0–0 | Northampton Town | Cambridge |
| 15:00 BST | | Report | | Stadium: Abbey Stadium |

== Competitions ==
=== League One ===
==== League table ====
| Pos | Team | Pld | W | D | L | GF | GA | GD | Pts |
|---|---|---|---|---|---|---|---|---|---|
| 10 | Portsmouth | 46 | 20 | 13 | 13 | 68 | 51 | +17 | 73 |
| 11 | Ipswich Town | 46 | 18 | 16 | 12 | 67 | 46 | +21 | 70 |
| 12 | Accrington Stanley | 46 | 17 | 10 | 19 | 61 | 80 | −19 | 61 |
| 13 | Charlton Athletic | 46 | 17 | 8 | 21 | 55 | 59 | −4 | 59 |
| 14 | Cambridge United | 46 | 15 | 13 | 18 | 56 | 74 | −18 | 58 |
| 15 | Cheltenham Town | 46 | 13 | 17 | 16 | 66 | 80 | −14 | 56 |
| 16 | Burton Albion | 46 | 14 | 11 | 21 | 51 | 67 | −16 | 53 |
| 17 | Lincoln City | 46 | 14 | 10 | 22 | 55 | 63 | −8 | 52 |
| 18 | Shrewsbury Town | 46 | 12 | 14 | 20 | 47 | 51 | −4 | 50 |

Source: EFL Official Website
Rules for classification: 1) Points; 2) Goal difference; 3) Number of goals scored; 4) Head-to-head results; 5) Wins; 6) Away goals; 7) Penalty points based on yellow and red cards received excluding the last four games of the season (sec 9.5); 8) 12-point sending off offences; 9) If the tie affects the automatic promotion or relegation places, a play-off game or games would be held between the two tied teams

==== Results summary ====
| Overall | | | | | | | | Home | | | | | | Away | | | | | |
| Pld | W | D | L | GF | GA | GD | Pts | W | D | L | GF | GA | GD | W | D | L | GF | GA | GD |
|---|---|---|---|---|---|---|---|---|---|---|---|---|---|---|---|---|---|---|---|
| 46 | 15 | 13 | 18 | 56 | 74 | −18 | 58 | 9 | 8 | 7 | 29 | 29 | 0 | 6 | 5 | 11 | 27 | 45 | −18 |

==== Results by matchday ====
| Matchday | 1 | 2 | 3 | 4 | 5 | 6 | 7 | 8 | 9 | 10 | 11 | 12 | 13 | 14 | 15 | 16 | 17 | 18 | 19 | 20 | 21 | 22 | 23 | 24 | 25 | 26 | 27 | 28 | 29 | 30 | 31 | 32 | 33 | 34 | 35 | 36 | 37 | 38 | 39 | 40 | 41 | 42 | 43 | 44 | 45 | 46 |
|---|---|---|---|---|---|---|---|---|---|---|---|---|---|---|---|---|---|---|---|---|---|---|---|---|---|---|---|---|---|---|---|---|---|---|---|---|---|---|---|---|---|---|---|---|---|---|
| Ground | H | A | A | H | H | H | A | H | H | A | H | H | A | A | H | A | A | A | H | H | A | A | H | H | A | H | H | A | A | A | A | H | H | A | A | H | A | H | A | A | H | H | A | H | A | H |
| Result | D | L | D | W | W | L | W | D | L | D | D | D | L | D | W | W | L | L | D | L | W | L | L | D | W | W | W | D | L | L | D | W | W | L | L | D | L | L | W | W | L | W | W | L | L | D |
| Position | 11 | 17 | 17 | 12 | 10 | 15 | 13 | 12 | 15 | 15 | 18 | 16 | 18 | 17 | 15 | 10 | 12 | 14 | 15 | 16 | 15 | 16 | 16 | 16 | 16 | 13 | 12 | 12 | 13 | 15 | 16 | 14 | 12 | 13 | 13 | 13 | 15 | 17 | 16 | 13 | 13 | 13 | 12 | 12 | 14 | 14 |

Source: Statto.com
A = Away; H = Home; W = Win; D = Draw; L = Loss

==== Matches ====
The U's fixtures were revealed on 24 June 2021.

| 7 August 2021 1 | Cambridge United | 1–1 | Oxford United | Cambridge |
| 15:00 BST | O'Neil (yellow card) 31'; Ironside 78' (pen.) | Report | Williams (yellow card) 30'; Seddon 42' (yellow card) 88' | Stadium: Abbey Stadium; Attendance: 6,444; Referee: David Rock |

| 14 August 2021 2 | Accrington Stanley | 2–1 | Cambridge United | Accrington |
| 15:00 BST | Butcher 14'; Pell (yellow card) 20' (goal) 30'; Pritchard (yellow card) 34'; Rodgers (yellow card) 81' | Report | Ironside 79' | Stadium: Wham Stadium; Attendance: 2,077; Referee: Ben Speedie |

| 17 August 2021 3 | Plymouth Argyle | 1–1 | Cambridge United | Plymouth |
| 19:45 BST | Wilson (yellow card) 6'; Jephcott 68'; Edwards (yellow card) 86' | Report | Williams (yellow card) 6'; May (yellow card) 57'; Brophy (yellow card) 72'; Ironside (penalty missed) 76' 76'; O'Neil (yellow card) 79'; Digby (yellow card) 90+1' | Stadium: Home Park; Attendance: 10,532; Referee: Christopher Sarginson |

| 21 August 2021 4 | Cambridge United | 3–0 | Burton Albion | Cambridge |
| 15:00 BST | Jones (yellow card) 34'; Smith 53'; Hamer 73', 79' (o.g.) | Report | Mancienne (yellow card) 18'; Brayford (yellow card) 71' | Stadium: Abbey Stadium; Attendance: 4,468; Referee: Ben Toner |

| 28 August 2021 5 | Cambridge United | 1–0 | Bolton Wanderers | Cambridge |
| 15:00 BST | Tracey 16'; Iredale (yellow card) 17'; Digby (yellow card) 38'; Hoolahan (yellow card) 54'; O'Neil (yellow card) 73' | Report | Williams (yellow card) 13'; Sarcevic (yellow card) 29'; Santos (yellow card) 88' | Stadium: Abbey Stadium; Attendance: 6,124; Referee: Ben Toner |

| 11 September 2021 6 | Cambridge United | 1–5 | Lincoln City | Cambridge |
| 15:00 BST | Williams (yellow card) 36'; Ironside 59'; Digby (yellow card) 72'; Knibbs (yellow card) 82' | Report | Adelakun 1'; McGrandles 16'; Scully 24', 72'; Fiorini 57' | Stadium: Abbey Stadium; Attendance: 5,833; Referee: Sam Purkiss |

| 18 September 2021 7 | Portsmouth | 1–2 | Cambridge United | Portsmouth |
| 15:00 BST | Williams (yellow card) 48'; Curtis 76' (yellow card) 90+1'; Brown (yellow card) 87' | Report | Ironside 38'; O'Neil 69'; Tracey (yellow card) 78'; Digby (yellow card) 86'; Williams (yellow card) 87' | Stadium: Fratton Park; Attendance: 15,330; Referee: Gavin Ward |

| 25 September 2021 8 | Cambridge United | 2–2 | Fleetwood Town | Cambridge |
| 15:00 BST | Digby (yellow card) 30'; May 35'; Tracey 51' | Report | Hill 2'; Lane 76' | Stadium: Abbey Stadium; Attendance: 4,429; Referee: Paul Howard |

| 28 September 2021 9 | Cambridge United | 0–2 | Gillingham | Cambridge |
| 15:00 BST | Jones (yellow card) 72' | Report | Tutonda (yellow card) 19'; Ehmer (yellow card) 22'; Oliver 26'; Lloyd 60'; Cumming (yellow card) 90+7' | Stadium: Abbey Stadium; Attendance: 4,019; Referee: James Bell |

| 2 October 2021 10 | Crewe Alexandra | 2–2 | Cambridge United | Crewe |
| 15:00 BST | Finney 10'; Kashket (yellow card) 20'; Robertson 26'; Ramsay (yellow card) 89' | Report | Jääskeläinen 79' (o.g.); May 90+4' | Stadium: Mornflake Stadium; Attendance: 4,237; Referee: Carl Brook |

| 16 October 2021 11 | Cambridge United | 2–2 | Ipswich Town | Cambridge |
| 15:00 BST | Brophy 40'; Ironside 88' | Report | Aluko 10', 36'; Chaplin (yellow card) 37' | Stadium: Abbey Stadium; Attendance: 7,944; Referee: Leigh Doughty |

| 19 October 2021 12 | Cambridge United | 1–1 | Sheffield Wednesday | Cambridge |
| 19:45 BST | Williams 20'; Iredale (yellow card) 67' | Report | Paterson (yellow card) 45'; Dele-Bashiru 80'; Palmer (yellow card) 90+2' | Stadium: Abbey Stadium; Attendance: 7,342; Referee: Scott Oldham |

| 23 October 2021 13 | Shrewsbury Town | 4–1 | Cambridge United | Shrewsbury |
| 15:00 BST | Bowman 6', 73', 83'; Ebanks-Landell (yellow card) 45+8'; Leahy 90' | Report | Digby (yellow card) 57'; Iredale 58'; Jones (yellow card) 60'; May (red card) 68'; Hoolahan (yellow card) 84'; Smith (yellow card) 85' | Stadium: Montgomery Waters Meadow; Referee: Simon Mather |

| 26 October 2021 14 | Doncaster Rovers | 1–1 | Cambridge United | Doncaster |
| 19:45 BST | Galbraith 68'; Williams (yellow card) 71' | Report | Gardner 7' (o.g.); Dunk (yellow card) 45+5' | Stadium: Keepmoat Stadium; Attendance: 6,146; Referee: Andy Haines |

| 30 October 2021 15 | Cambridge United | 1–0 | AFC Wimbledon | Cambridge |
| 15:00 BST | Iredale (yellow card) 43'; Weir 47'; Williams (yellow card) 71'; Jones (yellow card) 73' | Report | Palmer (yellow card) 73'; Woodyard (yellow card) 90' | Stadium: Abbey Stadium; Attendance: 5,609; Referee: Tom Reeves |

| 2 November 2021 16 | Morecambe | 0–2 | Cambridge United | Morecambe |
| 19:45 GMT | McDonald (yellow card) 19'; Stockton (yellow card) 45+1'; Ayunga (yellow card) 54'; Price (yellow card) 64' | Report | Worman 28'; Lankester (yellow card) 29'; Ironside 72' (pen.); Smith (yellow card) 78' | Stadium: Mazuma Stadium; Attendance: 3,414; Referee: Bobby Madley |

| 13 November 2021 17 | Milton Keynes Dons | 4–1 | Cambridge United | Denbigh |
| 15:00 GMT | Twine 13', 36'; Watters 25', 76'; Kasumu (yellow card) 60' | Report | Okedina (yellow card) 42'; Williams (yellow card) 50'; Smith 82' | Stadium: Stadium MK; Attendance: 9,904; Referee: Seb Stockbridge |

| 20 November 2021 18 | Rotherham United | 3–1 | Cambridge United | Rotherham |
| 15:00 GMT | Wood (yellow card) 30'; Wiles 34'; Barlaser 45+3' (pen.); Ladapo 81'; Lindsay (yellow card) 83' | Report | Smith 51' | Stadium: AESSEAL New York Stadium; Attendance: 9,534; Referee: Andy Davies |

| 23 November 2021 19 | Cambridge United | 2–2 | Wigan Athletic | Cambridge |
| 19:45 GMT | Ironside 44'; May 53'; Knibbs (yellow card) 86'; Weir (yellow card) 89' | Report | Keane 84'; Lang 87' | Stadium: Abbey Stadium; Attendance: 4,101; Referee: Declan Bourne |

| 27 November 2021 20 | Cambridge United | 1–2 | Sunderland | Cambridge |
| 15:00 GMT | Smith 27' | Report | Mitov 16' (o.g.); Pritchard (yellow card) 24'; Broadhead 36' | Stadium: Abbey Stadium; Attendance: 7,174; Referee: Robert Lewis |

| 7 December 2021 21 | Cheltenham Town | 0–5 | Cambridge United | Cheltenham |
| 19:45 GMT | Freestone (yellow card) 28'; Wright (yellow card) 31' | Report | Smith 37' (yellow card) 43'; Pollock 52' (o.g.); Ironside 63', 73', 88' | Stadium: Jonny-Rocks Stadium; Attendance: 2,762; Referee: Christopher Pollard |

| 11 December 2021 22 | Charlton Athletic | 2–0 | Cambridge United | Charlton |
| 15:00 GMT | Washington 30', 89' (yellow card) 56'; Famewo (yellow card) 39'; Stockley (yellow card) 45+3'; Clare (yellow card) 50'; Pearce (yellow card) 76' | Report | Dunk (yellow card) 14'; May (yellow card) 29'; Ironside (yellow card) 45+2'; Digby (yellow card) 45+3' | Stadium: The Valley; Attendance: 24,886; Referee: Ben Speedie |

| 18 December 2021 23 | Cambridge United | 0–1 | Rotherham United | Cambridge |
| 15:00 GMT | Smith (yellow card) 45+3'; Ironside (yellow card) 90' | | Barlaser 66'; Ihiekwe (yellow card) 87' | Stadium: Abbey Stadium; Attendance: 5,323; Referee: Trevor Kettle |

| 3 January 2022 24 | Cambridge United | 0–0 | Portsmouth | Cambridge |
| 15:00 GMT | Smith (yellow card) 16' (yellow-red card) 60'; Brophy (yellow card) 38'; Iredale (yellow card) 89' | Report | Romeo (yellow card) 26'; Raggett (yellow card) 90+6'; Williams (yellow card) 90+8' | Stadium: Abbey Stadium; Attendance: 6,832; Referee: Josh Smith |

| 15 January 2022 25 | Lincoln City | 0–1 | Cambridge United | Lincoln |
| 15:00 GMT | | Report | Brophy (yellow card) 71'; Ironside 90+1' | Stadium: LNER Stadium; Attendance: 8,507; Referee: Andrew Kitchen |

| 18 January 2022 26 | Cambridge United | 3–1 | Doncaster Rovers | Cambridge |
| 19:45 GMT | Iredale (yellow card) 28'; Knibbs 45+1'; Dunk 63'; Brophy (yellow card) 90+2'; Smith 90+3' | Report | Dodoo 71'; Galbraith (yellow card) 89' | Stadium: Abbey Stadium; Attendance: 4,575; Referee: Christopher Sarginson |

| 22 January 2022 27 | Cambridge United | 1–0 | Crewe Alexandra | Cambridge |
| 15:00 GMT | Sherring (yellow card) 29'; May 42'; Iredale (yellow card) 58'; Hoolahan (yellow card) 73' | Report | Offord (yellow card) 47'; Johnson (yellow card) 86' | Stadium: Abbey Stadium; Attendance: 5,428; Referee: Sam Allison |

| 29 January 2022 28 | Fleetwood Town | 1–1 | Cambridge United | Fleetwood |
| 15:00 GMT | Lane 72'; Camps (yellow card) 73' | Report | May (yellow card) 41'; Pilkington 65' (o.g.); Okedina (yellow card) 81' | Stadium: Highbury Stadium; Attendance: 2,515; Referee: Rebecca Welch |

| 1 February 2022 29 | Bolton Wanderers | 2–0 | Cambridge United | Horwich |
| 20:00 GMT | Bakayoko 39'; Afolayan 70'; Williams (yellow card) 87' | Report | Mitov (yellow card) 42' | Stadium: University of Bolton Stadium; Attendance: 13,334; Referee: Andy Haines |

| 8 February 2022 30 | Gillingham | 1–0 | Cambridge United | Gillingham |
| 19:45 GMT | Tutonda (yellow card) 58'; Thompson (yellow card) 67'; Oliver 86' | Report | | Stadium: Priestfield; Attendance: 3,824; Referee: James Bell |

| 12 February 2022 31 | Burton Albion | 2–2 | Cambridge United | Burton upon Trent |
| 15:00 GMT | Ahadme 2' (pen.); Gilligan (yellow card) 24'; Kokolo 62'; Hughes (yellow card) 66' | Report | Knibbs 25'; Smith 72'; Sherring (yellow card) 90+1' | Stadium: Pirelli Stadium; Attendance: 2,578; Referee: Marc Edwards |

| 19 February 2022 32 | Cambridge United | 2–0 | Accrington Stanley | Cambridge |
| 15:00 GMT | Smith 66'; Hoolahan 90+5' | Report | Nottingham (yellow card) 90+3' | Stadium: Abbey Stadium; Attendance: 5,602; Referee: Lee Swabey |

| 22 February 2022 33 | Cambridge United | 2–0 | Plymouth Argyle | Cambridge |
| 19:45 GMT | Smith 7'; Lankester 43'; Okedina (yellow card) 57'; Williams (yellow card) 61' | Report | Randell (yellow card) 43'; Bolton (yellow card) 52' | Stadium: Abbey Stadium; Attendance: 5,286; Referee: Bobby Madley |

| 26 February 2022 34 | Oxford United | 4–2 | Cambridge United | Oxford |
| 15:00 GMT | Brannagan (yellow card) 9' (goal) 64', 90'; Taylor 36'; Whyte (yellow card) 45+1'; Baldock 72' | Report | Smith 6', 56'; Brophy (yellow card) 10'; Dunk (yellow card) 21'; O'Neil (yellow card) 90+2' | Stadium: Kassam Stadium; Attendance: 10,004; Referee: Charles Breakspear |

| 1 March 2022 35 | Wycombe Wanderers | 3–0 | Cambridge United | High Wycombe |
| 19:45 GMT | Mehmeti 11', 85'; McCleary 15'; Obita (yellow card) 69'; McCarthy (yellow card) 84' | Report | May (yellow card) 36' | Stadium: Adams Park; Attendance: 4,083; Referee: James Oldham |

| 5 March 2022 36 | Cambridge United | 0–0 | Shrewsbury Town | Cambridge |
| 15:00 GMT | Okedina (yellow card) 90' | Report | Nurse (yellow card) 56'; Bowman (yellow card) 90' | Stadium: Abbey Stadium; Attendance: 5,651; Referee: Neil Hair |

| 12 March 2022 37 | Sheffield Wednesday | 6–0 | Cambridge United | Owlerton, Sheffield |
| 15:00 GMT | Jones 6' (o.g.); Bannan 10'; Berahino 37', 41', 54'; Byers 48' | Report | | Stadium: Hillsborough; Attendance: 22,646; Referee: Seb Stockbridge |

| 19 March 2022 38 | Cambridge United | 0–1 | Milton Keynes Dons | Cambridge |
| 15:00 GMT | Digby (yellow card) 22' | Report | Kasumu (yellow card) 11'; O'Hora (yellow card) 51' (goal) 60'; Coventry (yellow card) 88' | Stadium: Abbey Stadium; Attendance: 6,325; Referee: Sam Barrott |

| 26 March 2022 39 | AFC Wimbledon | 0–1 | Cambridge United | Wimbledon |
| 15:00 GMT | Cosgrove (yellow card) 28'; Rudoni (yellow card) 45'; Nightingale (yellow card) 63' | Report | May 46'; Tracey (yellow card) 90+2'; Digby (yellow card) 90+4' | Stadium: Plough Lane Stadium; Attendance: 8,463; Referee: Garry Maskell |

| 2 April 2022 40 | Ipswich Town | 0–1 | Cambridge United | Ipswich |
| 15:00 BST | Norwood (yellow card) 39'; Donacien (yellow card) 75'; Woolfenden (yellow card) 85'; Bonne (yellow card) 90+2' | Report | Smith (yellow card) 39'; Ironside 56'; Dunk (yellow card) 81'; May (yellow card) 83' | Stadium: Portman Road; Attendance: 26,515; Referee: Craig Hicks |

| 5 April 2022 41 | Cambridge United | 1–4 | Wycombe Wanderers | Cambridge |
| 19:45 BST | Knibbs 79'; Digby (yellow card) 86' | Report | Vokes 7', 54'; Scowen 56'; McCleary 89' | Stadium: Abbey Stadium; Attendance: 4,751; Referee: Will Finnie |

| 9 April 2022 42 | Cambridge United | 2–1 | Morecambe | Cambridge |
| 15:00 BST | Smith 42'; Ironside 71' (pen.) | Report | Fané (yellow card) 51'; Stockton 68' | Stadium: Abbey Stadium; Attendance: 5,813; Referee: Carl Boyeson |

| 15 April 2022 43 | Wigan Athletic | 1–2 | Cambridge United | Wigan |
| 17:15 BST | Lang (yellow card) 26'; Power (yellow card) 29'; Naylor 78' | Report | Knibbs 33'; Smith 43'; Williams (yellow card) 57'; Digby (yellow card) 90+4'; Mitov (yellow card) 90+6' | Stadium: DW Stadium; Attendance: 10,576; Referee: Ross Joyce |

| 19 April 2022 44 | Cambridge United | 0–2 | Charlton Athletic | Cambridge |
| 19:45 BST | | Report | Dobson (yellow card) 35'; Blackett-Taylor 73'; Washington (yellow card) 61' (goal) 80' | Stadium: Abbey Stadium; Attendance: 5,409; Referee: Paul Howard |

| 23 April 2022 45 | Sunderland | 5–1 | Cambridge United | Sunderland |
| 15:00 BST | Stewart 13' (pen.), 36'; Embleton 29'; Broadhead 53'; Batth 72' | Report | Jones (red card) 12'; Iredale (yellow card) 13'; Smith (yellow card) 28'; Digby 30' | Stadium: Stadium of Light; Attendance: 32,500; Referee: Peter Wright |

| 30 April 2022 46 | Cambridge United | 2–2 | Cheltenham Town | Cambridge |
| 12:30 BST | Smith 22', 50'; Simper (yellow card) 40'; O'Neil (yellow card) 45+1' | Report | May 23', (yellow card) 72', (goal) 90+1'; Long (yellow card) 45+1'; Boyle (yellow card) 53' (yellow-red card) 82'; Raglan (yellow card) 64' | Stadium: Abbey Stadium; Attendance: 5,880; Referee: Tom Reeves |

=== FA Cup ===
Cambridge were drawn away to Northampton Town in the first round, at home to Exeter City in the second round and away to Newcastle United in the third round.

| 6 November 2021 First round | Northampton Town | 2–2 | Cambridge United | Northampton |
| 15:00 GMT | Etete 6'; Horsfall (yellow card) 12'; Lewis 35'; McWilliams (yellow card) 87' | | Smith 14' (yellow card) 63'; Masterson 66' | Stadium: Sixfields Stadium; Attendance: 3,792; Referee: Martin Coy |

| 16 November 2021 First round replay | Cambridge United | 3–1 | Northampton Town | Cambridge |
| 19:45 GMT | Knibbs 13'; Smith 40'; Worman 48' | | Rose 75'; McGowan (yellow card) 82' | Stadium: Abbey Stadium; Attendance: 3,068; Referee: Darren Drysdale |

| 4 December 2021 Second round | Cambridge United | 2–1 | Exeter City | Cambridge |
| 15:00 GMT | Okedina (yellow card) 9'; May 23'; Knibbs 88'; Ironside (penalty missed) 90+9' | | Nombe 10'; Caprice (yellow card) 60'; Ray (yellow card) 82'; Dawson (yellow card) 88'; Collins (yellow card) 90+8' | Stadium: Abbey Stadium; Attendance: 2,834; Referee: David Rock |

| 8 January 2022 Third round | Newcastle United | 0–1 | Cambridge United | Newcastle upon Tyne |
| 15:00 GMT | | | Ironside 57'; Knibbs (yellow card) 66'; Lankester (yellow card) 79' | Stadium: St James' Park; Attendance: 51,395; Referee: Tony Harrington |

| 5 February 2022 Fourth round | Cambridge United | 0–3 | Luton Town | Cambridge |
| 17:30 GMT | May (yellow card) 46'; Digby (yellow card) 77' | | Burke 16'; Mendes Gomes 23'; Onyedinma (yellow card) 57'; Muskwe 88'; Kioso (yellow card) 90+2' | Stadium: Abbey Stadium; Attendance: 7,937; Referee: Josh Smith |

=== EFL Cup ===
Cambridge United were drawn at home to Swindon Town in the first round and away to Millwall in the second round.

| 10 August 2021 First round | Cambridge United | 0–0 (3–1 p) | Swindon Town | Cambridge |
| 19:45 BST | Iredale (yellow card) 38'; Weir (yellow card) 71'; May (yellow card) 74' | Report | | Stadium: Abbey Stadium; Attendance: 1,825; Referee: Trevor Kettle |
| | Penalties |
| | Ironside (penalty scored); Smith (penalty scored); Williams (penalty scored) | | Payne (penalty missed); McKirdy (penalty missed); Reed (penalty scored); Hunt (penalty missed) |

| 24 August 2021 Second round | Millwall | 3–1 | Cambridge United | Bermondsey |
| 19:45 BST | Wallace 39', 42'; Smith 54' | | Williams 33' | Stadium: The Den; Attendance: 4,005; Referee: Neil Hair |

=== EFL Trophy ===
The U's were drawn into Southern Group H alongside Oxford United, Stevenage and Tottenham Hotspur U21s. On July 7, the fixtures for the group stage was announced. In the knock-out stages, Cambridge were drawn at home to Portsmouth and away to Rotherham United in the quarter-finals.

| Pos | Div | Team | Pld | W | PW | PL | L | GF | GA | GD | Pts | Qualification |
|---|---|---|---|---|---|---|---|---|---|---|---|---|
| 1 | L1 | Cambridge United | 3 | 2 | 0 | 0 | 1 | 5 | 2 | +3 | 6 | Advance to Round 2 |
| 2 | L2 | Stevenage | 3 | 2 | 0 | 0 | 1 | 6 | 5 | +1 | 6 | Advance to Round 2 |
| 3 | ACA | Tottenham Hotspur U21 | 3 | 1 | 0 | 0 | 2 | 6 | 7 | −1 | 3 | |
| 4 | L1 | Oxford United | 3 | 1 | 0 | 0 | 2 | 5 | 8 | −3 | 3 | |

Source: EFL.com

| 31 August 2021 Group game 1 | Cambridge United | 4–1 | Oxford United | Cambridge |
| 19:00 BST | Smith 45', 45+3'; May (yellow card) 63'; Knibbs 80'; Yearn 90+3' | | Cooper (yellow card) 42'; Johnson (yellow card) 53'; Agyei 71' | Stadium: Abbey Stadium; Attendance: 1,390; Referee: Sam Allison |

| 21 September 2021 Group game 2 | Cambridge United | 1–0 | Tottenham Hotspur U21 | Cambridge |
| 19:00 BST | Lankester (yellow card) 44'; Smith 72' | | Oluwayemi (yellow card) 44' | Stadium: Abbey Stadium; Attendance: 2,025; Referee: Carl Boyeson |

| 9 November 2021 Group game 3 | Stevenage | 1–0 | Cambridge United | Stevenage |
| 19:00 GMT | Vancooten (yellow card) 13'; Reeves (yellow card) 38'; List 40' | | Masterson (yellow card) 62'; Weir (yellow card) 90+2' | Stadium: Broadhall Way; Attendance: 967; Referee: Charles Breakspear |

| 30 November 2021 Second round | Cambridge United | 2–0 | Walsall | Cambridge |
| 19:00 GMT | Smith 18' (pen.); Iredale (yellow card) 55'; Simper (yellow card) 69'; Tracey 80' | Report | Monthé (yellow card) 17'; White (yellow card) 21'; Phillips (penalty missed) 34' | Stadium: Abbey Stadium; Attendance: 780; Referee: Will Finnie |

| 11 January 2022 Third round | Cambridge United | 2–1 | Portsmouth | Cambridge |
| 19:00 GMT | Lankester (yellow card) 23'; Knibbs 50', 59'; Iredale (yellow card) 54' | Report | Jacobs 76' | Stadium: Abbey Stadium; Attendance: 1,308; Referee: Ben Toner |

| 25 January 2022 Quarter-finals | Rotherham United | 1–1 (7–6 p) | Cambridge United | Rotherham |
| 19:00 GMT | Harding (yellow card) 6' (goal) 9' | | Digby 40' | Stadium: AESSEAL New York Stadium; Attendance: 2,239; Referee: Martin Coy |
| | Penalties |
| | Ferguson (penalty scored); Ladapo (penalty scored); Miller (penalty scored); Wiles (penalty scored); Mattock (penalty scored); Lindsay (penalty scored); Ihiekwe (penalty scored) | | Smith (penalty scored); Dunk (penalty scored); Brophy (penalty scored); Williams (penalty scored); Knibbs (penalty scored); Mitov (penalty scored); May (penalty missed) |

== Transfers ==
=== Transfers in ===
| Date | Position | Name | From | Fee | Ref. |
|---|---|---|---|---|---|
| 25 June 2021 | RW | Jack Lankester (ENG) | Ipswich Town | Undisclosed | |
| 1 July 2021 | LM | James Brophy (ENG) | Leyton Orient | Free transfer | |
| 1 July 2021 | CB | Lloyd Jones (ENG) | Northampton Town | Free transfer | |
| 1 July 2021 | RW | Shilow Tracey (ENG) | Tottenham Hotspur | Free transfer | |
| 1 July 2021 | RB | George Williams (ENG) | Bristol Rovers | Free transfer | |
| 7 July 2021 | CF | Sam Smith (ENG) | Reading | Free transfer | |
| 3 August 2021 | GK | Will Mannion (ENG) | Pafos (CYP) | Free transfer | |
| 5 August 2021 | CB | Jubril Okedina (ENG) | Tottenham Hotspur | Undisclosed | |

=== Transfers out ===
| Date | Position | Name | To | Fee | Ref. |
|---|---|---|---|---|---|
| 30 June 2021 | GK | Callum Burton (ENG) | Plymouth Argyle | Released | |
| 30 June 2021 | LM | Luke Hannant (ENG) | Colchester United | Free transfer | |
| 30 June 2021 | RB | Kyle Knoyle (ENG) | Doncaster Rovers | Free transfer | |
| 30 June 2021 | CF | Paul Mullin (ENG) | Wrexham | Free transfer | |
| 30 June 2021 | CF | Joe Neal (ENG) | Biggleswade Town | Released | |
| 1 July 2021 | GK | Louis Chadwick (ENG) | St Neots Town | Free transfer | |
| 13 August 2021 | CF | Andrew Dallas (SCO) | Solihull Moors | Undisclosed | |
| 11 January 2022 | RB | Leon Davies (ENG) | Southend United | Free transfer | |

=== Loans in ===
| Date from | Position | Name | From | Date until | Ref. |
|---|---|---|---|---|---|
| 13 July 2021 | CM | Jensen Weir (ENG) | Brighton & Hove Albion | End of season | |
| 21 August 2021 | CB | Conor Masterson (IRL) | Queens Park Rangers | 3 January 2022 | |
| 26 October 2021 | GK | Tomáš Holý (CZE) | Ipswich Town | 2 November 2021 | |
| 11 January 2022 | CB | Sam Sherring (ENG) | Bournemouth | End of season | |
| 31 January 2022 | CF | Lorent Tolaj (SUI) | Brighton & Hove Albion | End of season | |

=== Loans out ===
| Date from | Position | Name | To | Date until | Ref. |
|---|---|---|---|---|---|
| 15 July 2021 | CM | Lewis Simper (ENG) | Yeovil Town | 26 October 2021 (Note: Lewis Simper was recalled due to injuries and suspensions.) | |
| 20 July 2021 | CB | Tom Dickens (ENG) | Chelmsford City | 16 December 2021 (Note: Tom Dickens was recalled from his season-long loan early by Cambridge United.) | |
| 3 September 2021 | CB | Mamadou Jobe (ENG) | St Neots Town | | |
| 22 October 2021 | GK | Will Mannion (ENG) | Havant & Waterlooville | November 2021 | |
| 29 November 2021 | RB | Leon Davies (ENG) | Weymouth | | |
| 28 January 2022 | CB | Tom Dickens (ENG) | Chelmsford City | | |
| 25 March 2022 | GK | Kai McKenzie-Lyle (GUY) | Chelmsford City | End of season | |
