= Tom Dickens =

English footballer (born 2001)

Personal information
- Full name: Thomas Oliver Dickens
- Date of birth: 13 December 2001 (age 24)
- Place of birth: Cambridge, England
- Height: 1.93 m (6 ft 4 in)
- Position: Centre-back

Team information
- Current team: King's Lynn Town

Youth career
- 2010–2020: Cambridge United

Senior career*
Years	Team	Apps	(Gls)
2020–2022	Cambridge United	0	(0)
2020	→ St Neots Town (loan)	9	(1)
2020	→ St Neots Town (loan)	7	(1)
2021	→ Chelmsford City (loan)	13	(0)
2022	→ Chelmsford City (loan)	6	(0)
2022	Welling United	7	(0)
2022–2023	Cheshunt	1	(0)
2022–2023	→ St Neots Town (loan)	20	(0)
2023–2025	AFC Sudbury	91	(4)
2025–	King's Lynn Town	47	(2)
- * Club domestic league appearances and goals as of 15:35, 1 June 2025 (UTC)

Tom Dickens (born 13 December 2001) is an English footballer who plays as a defender for King's Lynn Town.

== Career ==
On 3 January 2020, after progressing through Cambridge United's academy, Dickens signed his first professional contract with the club. A week later, Dickens was one of four Cambridge players sent out on loan to St Neots Town until the end of the 2019–20 season. After making nine appearances, scoring once, for St Neots, Dickens was loaned back out to the club ahead of the 2020–21 season. In his second spell at the club, Dickens made 13 appearances in all competitions, scoring twice. On 20 July 2021, Dickens joined Chelmsford City on loan until the end of the season, before being recalled by Cambridge in December 2021 after making 18 appearances in all competitions. On 11 January 2022, Dickens made his debut for Cambridge, coming on as a late substitute in a 2–1 EFL Trophy win against Portsmouth. On 28 January 2022, Dickens returned to Chelmsford on loan. At the end of the 2021–22 season, Dickens was released by Cambridge.
