= Jensen Weir =

English footballer (born 2002)

- Weir playing for Wigan Athletic in 2026

Personal information
- Full name: Jensen Guy Weir
- Date of birth: 31 January 2002 (age 24)
- Place of birth: Warrington, England
- Height: 6 ft 1 in (1.86 m)
- Position: Midfielder

Team information
- Current team: Wigan Athletic
- Number: 6

Youth career
- 2010–2017: Wigan Athletic

Senior career*
Years	Team	Apps	(Gls)
2017–2020	Wigan Athletic	1	(0)
2020–2024	Brighton & Hove Albion	0	(0)
2021–2022	→ Cambridge United (loan)	15	(1)
2022–2023	→ Morecambe (loan)	43	(10)
2023–2024	→ Blackpool (loan)	10	(0)
2024	→ Port Vale (loan)	17	(1)
2024–	Wigan Athletic	86	(5)

International career
2017–2018	Scotland U16	9	(9)
2018	Scotland U17	1	(0)
2018–2019	England U17	9	(0)
2019–2020	England U18	9	(0)
2021	England U20	2	(1)
- * Club domestic league appearances and goals as of 11:16, 22 November 2026 (UTC)

Jensen Guy Weir (born 31 January 2002) is an English professional footballer who plays as a midfielder for EFL League One club Wigan Athletic.

Weir began his career at Wigan Athletic, becoming the club's youngest ever player upon making his debut in November 2017. He was sold to Brighton & Hove Albion for a fee of £500,000 in July 2020. He was loaned out to Cambridge United for the 2021–22 season, though he missed the second half of the campaign with a knee injury. He spent the 2022–23 season on loan at Morecambe and was loaned to Blackpool and Port Vale in the 2023–24 season. He returned to Wigan in August 2024.

His father, David, represented Scotland at international level. Weir initially represented Scotland at under-16 and under-17 levels before he switched to play for England – the country of his birth, representing them at under-17, under-18 and under-20 levels.

== Early and personal life ==
Born in Warrington, his father is former Scotland international footballer David Weir. His brother, Lucas, played semi-professional football for 1874 Northwich. His sister, Kenzie, played for Everton women.

== Club career ==
=== Wigan Athletic ===
Weir joined Wigan Athletic aged eight. He made his senior debut at the DW Stadium on 7 November 2017, in an EFL Trophy game against Accrington Stanley, becoming the club's youngest ever player, at the age of 15 years and 280 days. He made his league debut in a Championship game at Birmingham City on 27 April 2019, coming on as a second half substitute for Nick Powell. He turned professional at the club three months later. Upon Weir's departure from Wigan, academy manager Gregor Rioch said that his sale would guarantee the immediate future of the club amidst administration and that he would also be a role model for other youth-team players to follow. First-team manager Paul Cook resigned less than a week after Weir was sold.

=== Brighton & Hove Albion ===
On 23 July 2020, Weir was sold to Premier League side Brighton & Hove Albion for £500,000 plus add-ons to help alleviate Wigan's financial problems; he signed a three-year deal with Brighton. His father was working as the club's loan player manager at the time. He played alongside player-coach Andrew Crofts for the under-23 team, who was impressed by his ability and work ethic. Head coach Graham Potter named him in a matchday squad for the first time for the senior side on 3 February 2021, though he remained an unused substitute in a 1–0 win at Liverpool. He scored four goals in 18 Professional Development League games for Simon Rusk's under-23 team in the 2020–21 season, including a brace against Manchester United.

==== Cambridge United (loan) ====
On 13 July 2021, Weir joined newly promoted League One side Cambridge United on a season-long loan deal. Mark Bonner played him alongside defensive anchor Paul Digby, with Weir and Wes Hoolahan expected to provide creativity going forward. Weir made his debut at the Abbey Stadium on 10 August, starting in the EFL Cup first round tie with Swindon Town where Cambridge won 3–1 on penalties after a goalless draw in the 90 minutes of play. Four days later, he made his league debut for the U's, starting and playing 61 minutes before being replaced by Adam May in a 2–1 defeat at Accrington Stanley. He went on to be moved further forward to play behind the striker in United's 4–2–3–1 formation, gaining more attacking freedom. Weir scored his first senior goal on 30 October, scoring the only goal of the game in a 1–0 home victory over AFC Wimbledon. Weir made his final appearance for the U's on 18 December, in a 1–0 home loss against Rotherham, as a knee injury kept him on the sidelines for the rest of the 2021–22 season.

==== Morecambe (loan) ====
On 25 July 2022, Weir returned to League One on a season-long loan deal to Morecambe. He was sent off after picking up two yellow cards on his Shrimps home debut and second appearance in the eventual penalty shoot-out win over Stoke City of the Championship in the EFL Cup on 9 August. He was nominated for the League One Goal of the Month for a long-range strike against Bristol Rovers in September. He enjoyed an excellent season at the Mazuma Stadium, leaving manager Derek Adams to fend off speculation of him being recalled to Brighton early from his loan. Weir scored 11 goals in 51 appearances, though Morecambe were relegated after finishing two points from safety.

==== Blackpool (loan) ====
On 11 August 2023, Weir returned to League One again, joining recently relegated Blackpool on a season-long loan. Weir was praised by Blackpool boss Neil Critchley. He found game time limited, however, in his 16 appearances for the club – providing three assists, starting just four league games, and was recalled from his loan on 1 January 2024.

==== Port Vale (loan) ====
On 9 January 2024, Weir was loaned out to League One side Port Vale for the remainder of the 2023–24 season. David Flitcroft, the club's director of football, stated that he had attempted to sign Weir in the summer but that he would now provide midfield options following the departure of loanee Ollie Arblaster and injuries to Funso Ojo and Ben Garrity. He mainly featured from the substitute bench under new manager Darren Moore.

=== Return to Wigan Athletic ===
On 29 August 2024, Weir rejoined Wigan Athletic, signing a two-year contract. Manager Shaun Maloney said that "Jensen has pushed extremely hard to make this move happen". He played 34 games in the 2024–25 campaign. Speaking in March 2026, he said he was a lot more confident playing under returning head coach Gary Caldwell. He played 46 games in the 2025–26 season.

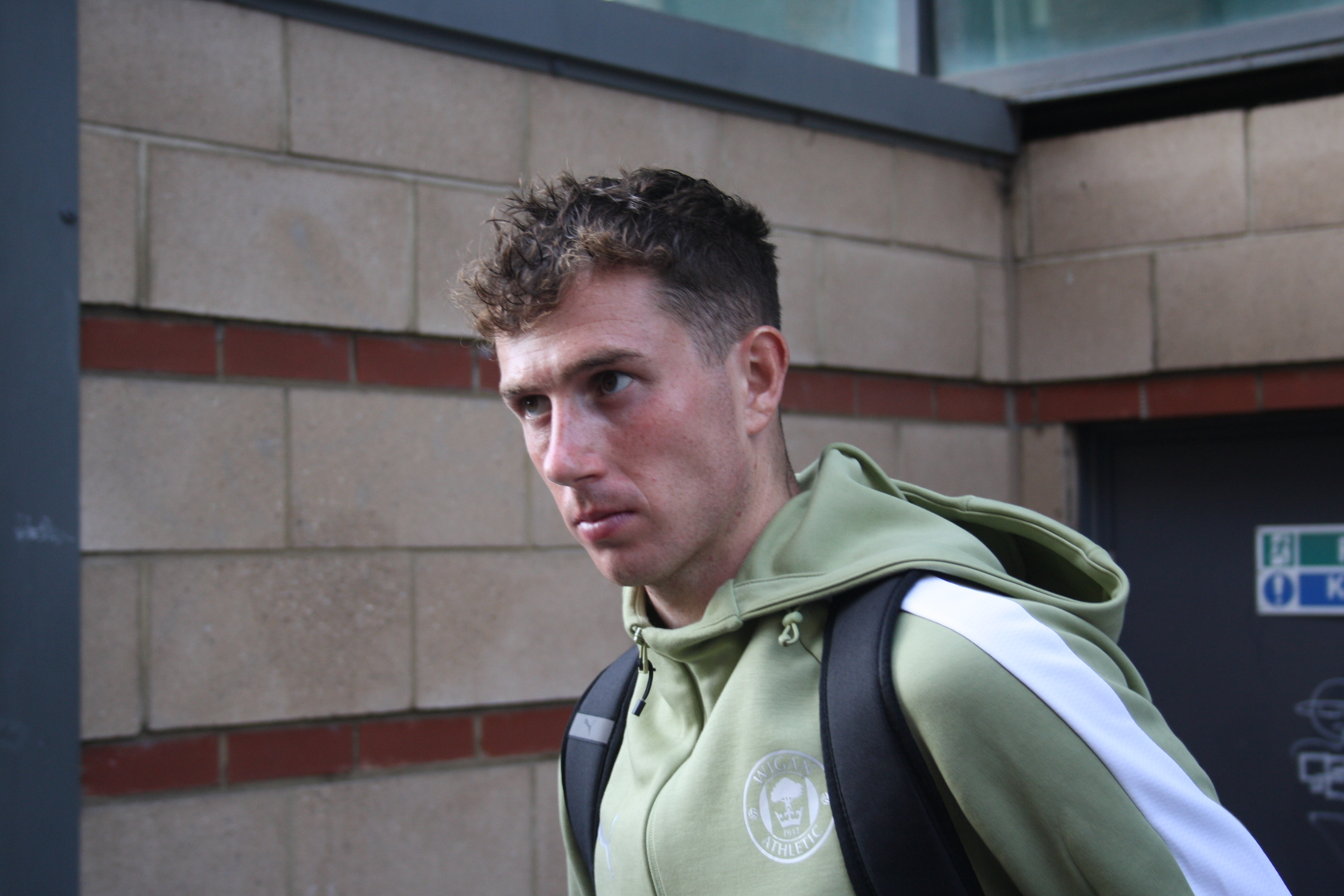
Weir in 2025.

== International career ==
Weir has played for Scotland at under-16 and under-17 level, captaining the under-16 team. In October 2018 he was called up by England under-17s, and made his debut during the 3–0 victory over Russia. In April 2019, Weir was included in the England squad for the 2019 UEFA European Under-17 Championship. He made his under-18 debut in a 3–2 victory over Australia at Leicester Road on 6 September 2019. On 6 September 2021, Weir made a goalscoring debut for the England under-20s during a 6–1 victory over Romania at St. George's Park.

== Style of play ==
Weir is a right-footed attacking midfielder with pace and creativity. He also has an excellent temperament, and his learning capacity allows him to play various roles.

== Career statistics ==
As of match played 21 November 2026

Appearances and goals by club, season and competition
Club	Season	League			FA Cup		EFL Cup		Other		Total	
Club	Season	Division	Apps	Goals	Apps	Goals	Apps	Goals	Apps	Goals	Apps	Goals
Wigan Athletic	2017–18	League One	0	0	0	0	0	0	1 (Note: Appearance(s) in EFL Trophy)	0	1	0
Wigan Athletic	2018–19	Championship	1	0	0	0	1	0	—		2	0
Wigan Athletic	2019–20	Championship	0	0	0	0	1	0	—		1	0
Wigan Athletic	Total		1	0	0	0	2	0	1	0	4	0
Brighton & Hove Albion U21s	2020–21	—			—		—		3	0	3	0
Brighton & Hove Albion U21s	2024–25	—			—		—		1	0	1	0
Brighton & Hove Albion U21s	Total		0	0	0	0	0	0	4	0	4	0
Brighton & Hove Albion	2020–21	Premier League	0	0	0	0	0	0	—		0	0
Brighton & Hove Albion	2021–22	Premier League	0	0	0	0	0	0	—		0	0
Brighton & Hove Albion	2022–23	Premier League	0	0	0	0	0	0	—		0	0
Brighton & Hove Albion	2023–24	Premier League	0	0	0	0	0	0	0	0	0	0
Brighton & Hove Albion	2024–25	Premier League	0	0	—		1	0	—		1	0
Brighton & Hove Albion	Total		0	0	0	0	1	0	0	0	1	0
Cambridge United (loan)	2021–22	League One	15	1	3	0	2	0	4	0	24	1
Morecambe (loan)	2022–23	League One	43	10	1	0	3	0	4	1	51	11
Blackpool (loan)	2023–24	League One	10	0	1	0	1	0	4	0	16	0
Port Vale (loan)	2023–24	League One	17	1	0	0	0	0	—		17	1
Wigan Athletic	2024–25	League One	33	0	2	0	0	0	0	0	35	0
Wigan Athletic	2025–26	League One	37	2	4	0	2	0	3	0	46	2
Wigan Athletic	2026–27	League One	16	3	1	0	1	0	3	0	21	3
Wigan Athletic	Total		86	5	7	0	3	0	6	0	102	5
Career total			172	17	12	0	12	0	23	1	219	18

== See also ==
- List of Scottish football families
