= Owen Moxon =

English footballer (born 1998)

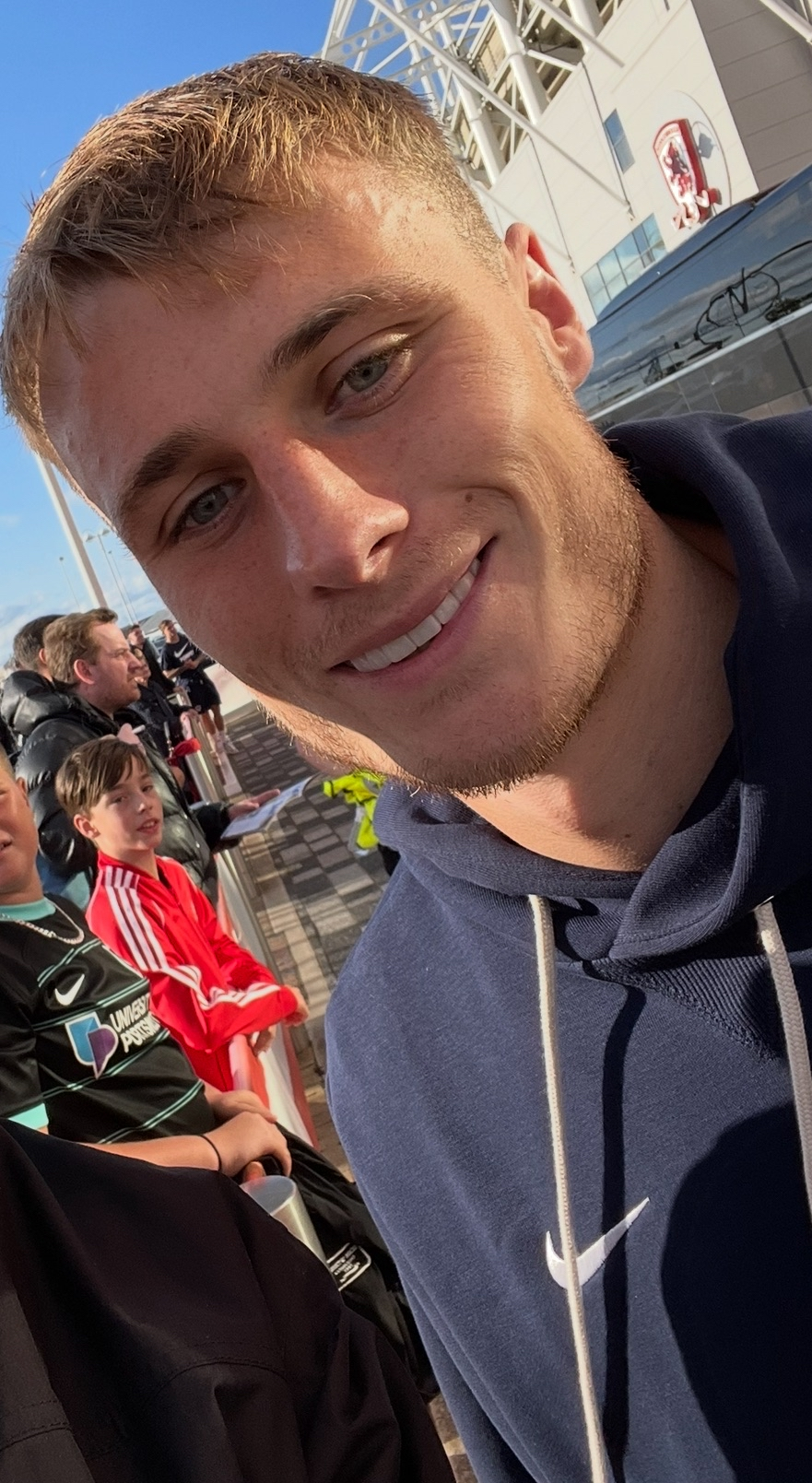
- Owen Moxon in 2024.

Personal information
- Full name: Owen James Moxon
- Date of birth: 17 January 1998 (age 28)
- Place of birth: Carlisle, England
- Height: 1.86 m (6 ft 1 in)
- Position: Midfielder

Team information
- Current team: Cambridge United (on loan from Stockport County)
- Number: 8

Youth career
- –2014: Carlisle United
- 2014–2015: Queen of the South

Senior career*
Years	Team	Apps	(Gls)
2015–2017	Queen of the South	6	(0)
2016–2017	→ Gretna 2008 (loan)	8	(2)
2017–2022	Annan Athletic	116	(12)
2022–2024	Carlisle United	82	(9)
2024–2025	Portsmouth	27	(1)
2025–	Stockport County	38	(1)
2026	→ Wigan Athletic (loan)	15	(2)
2026–	→ Cambridge United (loan)	12	(0)
- * Club domestic league appearances and goals as of 08:27, 7 November 2026 (UTC)

Owen James Moxon (born 17 January 1998) is an English professional footballer who plays as a midfielder for EFL League One club Cambridge United, on loan from EFL League One club Stockport County.

Moxon has previously played for Queen of the South, Gretna 2008, Annan Athletic and Carlisle United.

== Career ==
Born in Carlisle, Cumbria, Moxon played in Carlisle United's academy, before being released in 2014.

=== Queen of the South ===
Moxon began his senior career at Queen of the South. Moxon was first included in a senior match-day squad on 1 August 2015, remaining an unused substitute for their 4–3 extra-time win over Annan Athletic in the first round of the Scottish League Cup.

In the next round, on 25 August 2015, Moxon made his debut, replacing Kyle Hutton for the final 14 minutes of a 1–0 defeat to Greenock Morton at Palmerston Park. Moxon played his first league game on 5 September 2015, appearing for the final seven minutes, replacing Mark Millar as Queens lost 2–0 at Palmerston versus St Mirren in the Scottish Championship.

Moxon's contract was not renewed by Queen of the South, so after two seasons he was released by the club in May 2017.

==== Gretna 2008 (loan) ====
On 30 January 2017, Moxon moved on loan to Lowland League club Gretna 2008, for the remainder of the season.

=== Annan Athletic ===
On 22 June 2017, Moxon signed for Scottish League Two club Annan Athletic.

=== Return to Carlisle United ===
Moxon signed for Carlisle United in 2022, and was named in the EFL League Two Team of the Season in his first season with the club. He also received the Carlisle United player of the season award. Following promotion, the club confirmed that they had received a transfer offer for the midfielder which they had rejected.

In January 2024, Moxon was subject to transfer speculation following manager Paul Simpson's admission that the midfielder had rejected the offer of a new contract.

=== Portsmouth ===
On 1 February 2024, Moxon signed for League One leaders Portsmouth on a three-and-a-half-year deal for an undisclosed fee.

On 20 January 2026, after nearly a year with Stockport County, Moxon joined Wigan Athletic on loan until the end of the season.

== Career statistics ==
As of match played 6 November 2026

Appearances and goals by club, season and competition
Club	Season	League			National cup (Note: Includes Scottish Cup, FA Cup)		League cup (Note: Includes Scottish League Cup, EFL Cup)		Other		Total	
Club	Season	Division	Apps	Goals	Apps	Goals	Apps	Goals	Apps	Goals	Apps	Goals
Queen of the South	2015–16	Scottish Championship	1	0	0	0	1	0	0	0	2	0
Queen of the South	2016–17	Scottish Championship	5	0	0	0	1	0	2 (Note: Appearance(s) in the Scottish Challenge Cup)	0	8	0
Queen of the South	Total		6	0	0	0	2	0	2	0	10	0
Gretna 2008 (loan)	2016–17	Lowland Football League	8	2	0	0	—		2 (Note: Appearance(s) in the Lowland League Cup)	1	10	3
Annan Athletic	2017–18	Scottish League Two	32	1	1	0	3	0	1	0	37	1
Annan Athletic	2018–19	Scottish League Two	32	4	3	0	3	0	6 (Note: Two appearances in the Scottish Challenge Cup and four appearances in the Scottish League One play-offs)	0	44	4
Annan Athletic	2019–20	Scottish League Two	0	0	0	0	0	0	0	0	0	0
Annan Athletic	2020–21	Scottish League Two	18	1	0	0	3	1	0	0	21	2
Annan Athletic	2021–22	Scottish League Two	34	6	4	2	3	0	5	0	46	8
Annan Athletic	Total		116	12	8	2	12	1	12	0	148	15
Carlisle United	2022–23	EFL League Two	45	6	2	0	1	0	6 (Note: 3 appearances in the EFL Trophy and 3 appearances in the play-offs)	0	54	6
Carlisle United	2023–24	EFL League One	26	3	1	0	0	0	1	0	28	3
Carlisle United	Total		71	9	3	0	1	0	7	0	82	9
Portsmouth	2023–24	EFL League One	15	1	0	0	0	0	0	0	15	1
Portsmouth	2024–25	EFL Championship	12	0	1	0	0	0	0	0	13	0
Portsmouth	Total		27	1	1	0	0	0	0	0	27	1
Stockport County	2024–25	EFL League One	17	0	0	0	0	0	2 (Note: Appearances in EFL League One play-offs)	0	19	0
Stockport County	2025–26	EFL League One	21	1	2	0	0	0	4 (Note: Appearances in EFL Trophy)	0	27	1
Stockport County	2026–27	EFL League One	0	0	0	0	0	0	1 (Note: Appearances in EFL Trophy)	0	1	0
Wigan Athletic (loan)	2025–26	EFL League One	15	2	1	0	0	0	—		16	1
Cambridge United (loan)	2026–27	League One	12	0	1	0	–		3	0	16	0
Career total			285	25	16	2	15	1	31	1	312	29

== Honours ==
Carlisle United

- EFL League Two play-offs: 2023

Portsmouth

- EFL League One: 2023–24

Individual

- PFA Scotland Team of the Year: 2021–22 Scottish League Two
- PFA Team of the Year: 2022–23 League Two
- EFL League Two Team of the Season: 2022–23
- Carlisle United Player of the Year: 2022–23
