= 2025–26 Wigan Athletic F.C. season =

94th season in existence of Wigan Athletic FC

Wigan Athletic
2025–26 season
- Owner: Mike Danson
- Chairman: Ben Goodburn
- Manager: Gary Caldwell
- Stadium: Brick Community Stadium
- League One: 16th
- FA Cup: Fourth round
- EFL Cup: Third round
- EFL Trophy: Group stage
- Top goalscorer: League: Joe Taylor (11); All: Joe Taylor (11)
- Highest home attendance: 16,710
- Lowest home attendance: 7,343
- Average home league attendance: 9,974
- Biggest win: 3–0 (vs Doncaster Rovers, 13 September) (vs Rotherham United, 14 April)
- Biggest defeat: 1–6 (vs Peterborough United, 7 February)
Home colours	Away colours	Third colours
- All statistics correct as of 2 June 2026.

The 2025–26 season was the 94th season in the history of Wigan Athletic Football Club, and their third consecutive season in League One. In addition to the domestic league, the club also participated in the FA Cup, the EFL Cup, and the EFL Trophy.

== Managerial changes ==
On 7 February, Ryan Lowe was dismissed as role as the club's head coach, after forty-nine games in charge and a 24.49% win ratio. Nine days later, Gary Caldwell was appointed as the new manager, joining from Exeter City for a compensation fee.

== Transfers and contracts ==
=== In ===
Date	Pos.	Player	From	Fee	Ref.
19 June 2025	CF	(England) Christian Saydee	(England) Portsmouth	Undisclosed	
25 June 2025	CF	(Republic of Ireland) Dara Costelloe	(England) Burnley	£350,000 (Note: The fee was reported as being £350,000 rising to £500,000 in add-ons)	
1 July 2025 (Note: The transfer was announced on 9 June, and would become official on 1 July once his contract had expired at Kilmarnock)	LM	(Scotland) Fraser Murray	(Scotland) Kilmarnock	Free	
2 August 2025	LB	(Wales) Morgan Fox	(England) Queens Park Rangers	Free	
1 September 2025	GK	(England) Toby Savin	(England) Shrewsbury Town	Undisclosed	
24 September 2025	CM	(England) Joe Gilbertson	Free agent	Free	
8 January 2026	CF	(England) Adam Moseley	(England) Runcorn Linnets	Undisclosed	
2 February 2026	RB	(England) Jack Hunt	(England) Stockport County	Free	

=== Out ===
Date	Pos.	Player	To	Fee	Ref.
10 July 2025	CB	(Uganda) Toby Sibbick	(England) Burton Albion	Undisclosed	
27 March 2026	CM	(England) Harry McHugh	(England) Macclesfield	Free	

=== Loaned in ===
Date	Pos.	Player	From	Date until	Ref.
23 June 2025	CF	(England) Paul Mullin	(Wales) Wrexham	5 January 2026 (Note: On 5 January, Mullin was recalled to his parent club Wrexham)	
4 July 2025	CM	(England) Callum Wright	(England) Plymouth Argyle	31 May 2026	
31 July 2025	CM	(England) Ryan Trevitt	(England) Brentford	31 May 2026	
1 August 2025	RB	(England) Isaac Mabaya	(England) Liverpool	31 May 2026	
1 September 2025	AM	(Wales) Ollie Cooper	(Wales) Swansea City	2 January 2026 (Note: On 2 January, Cooper was recalled to his parent club Swansea)	
1 September 2025	LW	(Australia) Raphael Borges Rodrigues	(England) Coventry City	31 May 2026	
15 January 2026	CF	(Wales) Joe Taylor	(England) Huddersfield Town	31 May 2026	
20 January 2026	CM	(England) Owen Moxon	(England) Stockport County	31 May 2026	
2 February 2026	RW	(England) Caylan Vickers	(England) Brighton & Hove Albion	31 May 2026	

=== Loaned out ===
Date	Pos.	Player	To	Date until	Ref.
8 July 2025	CM	(England) Kai Payne	(England) Oldham Athletic	31 May 2026	
5 August 2025	AM	(England) Ronan Darcy	(England) Chesterfield	16 January 2026 (Note: On 16 January, Darcy's initial season-long loan at Chesterfield was terminated)	
8 August 2025	GK	(England) Matteo Spinelli	(England) Marine	7 September 2025	
26 August 2025	CB	(England) Jon Mellish	(England) MK Dons	31 May 2026 (Note: On 6 January, Watson's loan at South Shields was extended by a further month. Then on 2 February, Watson's loan at South Shields was extended until the end of the season)	
1 September 2025	RW	(England) Jonny Smith	(England) Gillingham	31 May 2026	
10 November 2025	GK	(England) Tom Watson	(England) South Shields	31 May 2026	
14 November 2025	LB	(England) K'Marni Miller	(England) Radcliffe	31 January 2026 (Note: On 6 January, Miller's loan at Radcliffe was extended by a further month)	
21 November 2025	RW	(England) Christy Edwards	(England) Witton Albion	18 December 2025	
21 November 2025	AM	(England) Leo Graham	(England) Bury	9 March 2026 (Note: On 27 December, Graham's loan at Bury was extended by a further month. Then on 26 January, Graham's loan at Bury was extended until the end of the season. But on 9 March he was recalled from his loan)	
25 November 2025	CB	(England) Jack Rogers	(England) Macclesfield	27 December 2025	
4 December 2025	AM	(England) Chris Sze	(England) Southport	31 May 2026 (Note: On 9 January, Sze's loan at Southport was extended by a further month. Then on 2 February, Sze's loan at Southport was extended until the end of the season)	
30 December 2025	GK	(England) Matteo Spinelli	(England) Prescot Cables	31 January 2026	
21 January 2026	AM	(England) Ronan Darcy	(England) Crawley Town	31 May 2026	
31 January 2026	GK	(England) Matthew Corran	(England) Atherton Collieries	28 February 2026	
2 February 2026	CM	(England) Tobias Brenan	(England) Harrogate Town	31 May 2026	
23 February 2026	RW	(England) Maleace Asamoah	(Republic of Ireland) Shamrock Rovers	30 November 2026	

=== Released / Out of Contract ===
Date	Pos.	Player	Subsequent club	Join date	Ref.
30 June 2025	CM	(Wales) Scott Smith	(England) Barrow	1 July 2025	
30 June 2025	RM	(England) Finn O'Boyle	(England) Quorn	2 August 2025	
30 June 2025	LB	(England) Jack Bates	(England) Congleton Town	9 August 2025	
30 June 2025	GK	(England) Andy Lonergan	(England) Liverpool Women	20 August 2025	
30 June 2025	RB	(England) Jack Reilly	(Australia) Altona East Phoenix SC	16 March 2026	
1 September 2025	RW	(England) Dion Rankine	(England) Crewe Alexandra	1 September 2025	
1 September 2025	RB	(England) Josh Robinson	(England) Kidderminster Harriers	27 March 2026	

=== New Contract ===
Date	Pos.	Player	Contract until	Ref.
27 May 2025	GK	(England) Tom Watson	30 June 2028 (Note: Club option of a further year)	
4 June 2025	CM	(England) Harry McHugh	30 June 2026	
13 June 2025	GK	(England) Matthew Corran	30 June 2026 (Note: Option of a further year)	
4 July 2025	RW	(England) Callum McManaman	30 June 2026	
11 July 2025	LB	(England) K'Marni Miller	30 June 2027	
11 August 2025	CB	(England) Sam Bolland	Undisclosed (Note: First professional contract)	
11 August 2025	RW	(England) Christy Edwards	Undisclosed	
11 August 2025	AM	(England) Reece Greenhalgh	Undisclosed	
11 August 2025	RB	(England) Alex Hughes	Undisclosed	
11 August 2025	CB	(England) James Knott	Undisclosed	
11 August 2025	CM	(England) Charley McKee	Undisclosed	
11 August 2025	DM	(England) Harrison Rimmer	Undisclosed	
11 August 2025	CF	(England) Cole Simms	Undisclosed	
11 August 2025	GK	(England) Jake Spaven	Undisclosed	
8 October 2025	CM	(England) Tobias Brenan	30 June 2028	

== Pre-season and friendlies ==
On 30 May, Wigan Athletic announced their first pre-season fixtute to be against Curzon Ashton during a warm-weather training camp in Campoamor, Spain. Five days later, three friendlies were confirmed against Chorley, Accrington Stanley and Tranmere Rovers.

Win Draw Loss Fixtures

5 July 2025 Friendly	Chorley	1–2	Wigan Athletic	Chorley
15:00 BST	Carr 35'	Report	Costelloe 77', 78'	Stadium: Victory Park; Attendance: 2,243

12 July 2025 Friendly	Curzon Ashton	1–1	Wigan Athletic	Dehesa de Campoamor, Spain
11:00 CEST	Weston 2'	Report	McManaman 81'	Stadium: Real Club De Golf Campoamor Resort

19 July 2025 Friendly	Accrington Stanley	2–4	Wigan Athletic	Accrington
15:00 BST	Whalley 34', 54'	Report	Costelloe 65', 79' (pen.); Asamoah 76', 89'	Stadium: Crown Ground; Attendance: 1,141 (676 away)

22 July 2025 Friendly	Liverpool U21	1–1	Wigan Athletic	Kirkby
13:00 BST	Figueroa	Report	Mullin	Stadium: The Academy; Attendance: 0 (behind closed doors)

26 July 2025 Friendly	Tranmere Rovers	0–1	Wigan Athletic	Birkenhead
15:00 BST		Report	Carragher 17'	Stadium: Prenton Park; Attendance: 2,338 (446 away)

== Competitions ==
=== Overall record ===
Competition	First match	Last match	Starting round	Final position	Record							
Competition	First match	Last match	Starting round	Final position	Pld	W	D	L	GF	GA	GD	Win %
League One	2 August 2025	2 May 2026	Matchday 1	16th	46	14	14	18	49	58	−9	30.43
FA Cup	1 November 2025	15 February 2026	First round	Fourth Round	4	1	2	1	4	7	−3	25.00
EFL Cup	12 August 2025	23 September 2025	First round	Third Round	3	2	0	1	2	2	+0	66.67
EFL Trophy	2 September 2025	11 November 2025	Group Stage	Group Stage	3	0	1	2	2	5	−3	0.00
Total					56	17	17	22	57	72	−15	30.36

Last updated: 2 May 2026

== League table ==
Pos	Team	Pld	W	D	L	GF	GA	GD	Pts
14	Doncaster Rovers	46	17	9	20	50	69	−19	60
15	Barnsley	46	15	14	17	68	73	−5	59
16	Wigan Athletic	46	14	14	18	49	58	−9	56
17	Burton Albion	46	13	15	18	50	60	−10	54
18	Peterborough United	46	15	8	23	64	68	−4	53

Source: EFL Official Website
Rules for classification: 1) Points; 2) Goal difference; 3) Number of goals scored; 4) Head-to-head results; 5) Wins; 6) Away goals; 7) Penalty points (sec 9.5); 8) 12-point sending off offences

== Results summary ==
Overall								Home						Away					
Pld	W	D	L	GF	GA	GD	Pts	W	D	L	GF	GA	GD	W	D	L	GF	GA	GD
46	14	14	18	49	58	−9	56	11	4	8	24	17	+7	3	10	10	25	41	−16

Last updated: 2 May 2026.
Source: Soccerstats

== Results by round ==
Round	1	2	3	4	5	6	7	8	9	10	11	12	13	14	15	17	18	19	20	21	22	23	24	25	27	28	29	30	31	16^{1}	33	34	35	36	26^{2}	37	38	39	40	41	42	43	32^{3}	44	45	46
Ground	H	A	H	A	A	H	A	H	A	H	A	H	H	A	A	A	H	H	A	H	A	A	H	A	H	A	A	H	A	H	H	A	H	A	H	H	A	H	A	H	A	H	H	A	H	A
Result	W	L	W	L	D	D	D	W	L	L	D	L	W	D	D	W	D	W	D	L	L	W	D	L	L	D	L	L	L	L	W	L	W	D	L	W	D	W	L	D	W	W	W	D	L	L
Position	3	12	8	13	12	13	14	8	12	14	14	17	13	13	16	15	17	11	11	14	18	12	14	15	18	19	19	19	22	22	20	21	19	19	21	20	20	19	19	19	18	15	13	13	16	16
Points	3	3	6	6	7	8	9	12	12	12	13	13	16	17	18	21	22	25	26	26	26	29	30	30	30	31	31	31	31	31	34	34	37	38	38	41	42	45	45	46	49	52	55	56	56	56

Source: EFL
A = Away; H = Home; W = Win; D = Draw; L = Loss; P = Postponed
Notes:
- ^{1} Matchday 16 (vs. Reading) was postponed due to international call-ups.
- ^{2} Matchday 26 (vs. Plymouth Argyle) was postponed due to Wigan's involvement in the FA Cup
- ^{3} Matchday 32 (vs. Rotherham United) was postponed due to Wigan's involvement in the FA Cup

== League One ==
On 26 June, the League One fixtures were announced.

Win Draw Loss Postponed

2 August 2025 1	Wigan Athletic	3–1	Northampton Town	Wigan
15:00 BST	Murray 29', 46'; Weir 43'	Report	Thorniley (yellow card) 64'; Forbes 70'; McCarthy (yellow card) 76'	Stadium: Brick Community Stadium; Attendance: 9,471; Referee: Alex Chilowicz

9 August 2025 2	Leyton Orient	2–0	Wigan Athletic	Leyton
15:00 BST	Sessegnon 18' (o.g.); Koroma 60'	Report	Sessegnon (yellow card) 38', (red card) 85'	Stadium: Brisbane Road; Attendance: 8,111; Referee: Neil Hair

16 August 2025 3	Wigan Athletic	2–0	Peterborough United	Wigan
15:00 BST	Saydee 5'; Kerr 28'; Trevitt (yellow card) 58'	Report	Ihionvien (yellow card) 57'; Hayes (yellow card) 90+2'	Stadium: Brick Community Stadium; Attendance: 8,748; Referee: Stephen Parkinson

19 August 2025 4	Luton Town	1–0	Wigan Athletic	Luton
19:45 BST	Saville 9' (yellow card) 67'	Report	Brenan (yellow card) 11'; Kerr (yellow card) 55'	Stadium: Kenilworth Road; Attendance: 10,751; Referee: Carl Brook

23 August 2025 5	Rotherham United	2–2	Wigan Athletic	Rotherham
12:30 BST	Kelly (yellow card) 29'; McWilliams 60'; Sherif 80'	Report	Raggett 42' (o.g.); Francois (yellow card) 55'; Wright (yellow card) 66'; Mullin 88'; Costelloe (yellow card) 90+5'	Stadium: New York Stadium; Attendance: 8,200; Referee: Oliver Langford

30 August 2025 6	Wigan Athletic	1–1	Stockport County	Wigan
15:00 BST	Saydee 78'; M.Smith (yellow card) 90+1'	Report	Fevrier 4'; Connolly (yellow card) 63'; Andrew (yellow card) 90'	Stadium: Brick Community Stadium; Attendance: 11,078; Referee: Ross Joyce

6 September 2025 7	Lincoln City	2–2	Wigan Athletic	Lincoln
15:00 BST	Bayliss (yellow card) 24'; Darikwa (yellow card) 27'; Collins 31' (pen.), 34'; Street (yellow card) 64' (yellow-red card) 77'; Towler (yellow card) 79'	Report	Mullin 10'; Wright 50'; Saydee (red card) 68'	Stadium: LNER Stadium; Attendance: 8,208; Referee: Alan Young

13 September 2025 8	Wigan Athletic	3–0	Doncaster Rovers	Wigan
15:00 BST	Costelloe 11'; M.Smith 14'; Mullin (yellow card) 43'; Murray 50'; Fox (yellow card) 69'	Report	Senior (yellow card) 76'	Stadium: Brick Community Stadium; Attendance: 9,288; Referee: Craig Hicks

20 September 2025 9	Bolton Wanderers	4–1	Wigan Athletic	Horwich
12:30 BST	Gale 15'; Forss 20', 50'; Burstow 42'	Report	Hungbo (yellow card) 45+6'; Mullin 54'	Stadium: Toughsheet Community Stadium; Attendance: 25.565; Referee: Benjamin Speedie
Note: Fixture was originally scheduled for a 15:00 kick-off, but was moved following an agreement with both clubs.

27 September 2025 10	Wigan Athletic	0–2	Cardiff City	Wigan
15:00 BST	M.Smith (yellow card) 33'; Fox (red card) 90+5'	Report	Ng 17'; Willock (yellow card) 88'; Salech 90+6' (pen.)	Stadium: Brick Community Stadium; Attendance: 10,609; Referee: Darren Drysdale

4 October 2025 11	Plymouth Argyle	1–1	Wigan Athletic	Plymouth
15:00 BST	Oseni (yellow card) 31'; Mumba (yellow card) 65'; Tolaj 70' (pen.)	Report	Murray (yellow card) 24', (goal) 82'; M.Smith (yellow card) 32'; Robinson (yellow card) 42'; Aimson (yellow card) 69'; Sessegnon (yellow card) 78'	Stadium: Home Park; Attendance: 16,062; Referee: Ben Atkinson

11 October 2025 12	Wigan Athletic	0–1	Wycombe Wanderers	Wigan
15:00 BST	Aimson (yellow card) 61'	Report	Bell 35' (yellow card) 57'; Allen (yellow card) 76'	Stadium: Brick Community Stadium; Attendance: 7,866; Referee: Andrew Humphries

18 October 2025 13	Wigan Athletic	1–0	Port Vale	Wigan
15:00 BST	Costelloe (red card) 44'; Asamoah Jr 56'; Murray (yellow card) 82'	Report	Byers (yellow card) 5'; Curtis (yellow card) 20'	Stadium: Brick Community Stadium; Attendance: 10,932; Referee: Ross Martin

25 October 2025 14	Mansfield Town	1–1	Wigan Athletic	Mansfield
12:30 BST	Evans 32'; McDonnell (yellow card) 45+2'	Report	M.Smith (yellow card) 39'; Murray (yellow card) 45'; Cooper 59'; Saydee (yellow card) 61'	Stadium: Field Mill; Attendance: 7,598; Referee: Seb Stockbridge
Note: Fixture was originally scheduled for a 15:00 kick-off, but was rescheduled for live Sky Sports broadcasting.

8 November 2025 15	Exeter City	1–1	Wigan Athletic	Exeter
15:00 GMT	Wareham (yellow card) 31', (goal) 53'	Report	Wright 24'; M.Smith (yellow card) 64'	Stadium: St James Park; Attendance: 6,585; Referee: Stephen Parkinson

22 November 2025 17	AFC Wimbledon	1–2	Wigan Athletic	Wimbledon
15:00 GMT	Reeves (yellow card) 40'; Johnson (yellow card) 53'; Smith 70'	Report	Murray (yellow card) 33'; Bettoni 77', 87'	Stadium: Cherry Red Records Stadium; Attendance: 8,370; Referee: Richard Eley

29 November 2025 18	Wigan Athletic	0–0	Stevenage	Wigan
15:00 GMT		Report	Freestone (yellow card) 84'	Stadium: Brick Community Stadium; Attendance: 8,679; Referee: Ross Joyce

2 December 2025 19	Wigan Athletic	1–0	Burton Albion	Wigan
19:45 GMT	Mullin 41'; Weir (yellow card) 70'	Report	Moon (yellow card) 36'	Stadium: Brick Community Stadium; Attendance: 7,343; Referee: Martin Woods
Note: Fixture was originally scheduled for 9 December, but was postponed due to Burton's FA Cup fixture being moved to 8 December for TV coverage.

13 December 2025 20	Huddersfield Town	1–1	Wigan Athletic	Huddersfield
12:30 GMT	Wallace (yellow card) 1' (goal) 33'; Gooch (yellow card) 46'	Report	Robinson (yellow card) 5'; Saydee (yellow card) 40'; Borges Rodrigues 52'	Stadium: Accu Stadium; Attendance: 16,442; Referee: Darren Drysdale
Note: Fixture was originally scheduled for a 15:00 kick-off, but was rescheduled for live Sky Sports broadcasting.

20 December 2025 21	Wigan Athletic	0–2	Blackpool	Wigan
12:30 GMT	Costelloe (yellow card) 11'; Raphael (yellow card) 83'	Report	Horsfall (yellow card) 42'; Casey (yellow card) 45+4'; Husband (yellow card) 49'; Fletcher 59'; Taylor 64'; Lyons (yellow card) 88'	Stadium: Brick Community Stadium; Attendance: 10,670; Referee: John Busby
Note: Fixture was originally scheduled for a 15:00 kick-off, but was rescheduled for live Sky Sports broadcasting.

26 December 2025 22	Bradford City	2–1	Wigan Athletic	Bradford
15:00 GMT	Humphrys 45'; Metcalfe (yellow card) 46'; Power (yellow card) 66'; J.Wright 90'	Report	Weir (yellow card) 27' (yellow-red card) 70'; Aimson (yellow card) 54'; C.Wright 63'; M.Smith (red card) 86'	Stadium: Valley Parade; Attendance: 22,698; Referee: Seb Stockbridge

29 December 2025 23	Burton Albion	0–2	Wigan Athletic	Burton-on-Trent
19:45 GMT		Report	Wright (yellow card) 41'; Bettoni 64'; Costelloe 87'	Stadium: Pirelli Stadium; Attendance: 3,696; Referee: Richie Watkins

1 January 2026 24	Wigan Athletic	1–1	Barnsley	Wigan
15:00 GMT	Costelloe 6'; Aimson (yellow card) 85'	Report	Phillips 69'; Connell (red card) 84'	Stadium: Brick Community Stadium; Attendance: 9,079; Referee: Ben Speedie

4 January 2026 25	Cardiff City	1–0	Wigan Athletic	Cardiff
15:00 GMT	Chambers 24'	Report		Stadium: Cardiff City Stadium; Attendance: 18,174; Referee: Will Finnie

17 January 2026 27	Wigan Athletic	0–1	Bolton Wanderers	Wigan
12:30 GMT		Report	Sheehan (yellow card) 22', (goal) 82'	Stadium: Brick Community Stadium; Attendance: 15,121; Referee: Stephen Martin
Note: Fixture was originally scheduled for a 15:00 kick-off, but was moved following an agreement with both clubs.

24 January 2026 28	Doncaster Rovers	3–3	Wigan Athletic	Doncaster
15:00 GMT	Okoronkwo 7'; McGrath 21'; Clifton 49'; Broadbent (yellow card) 58'; Gotts (yellow card) 79'; Senior (yellow card) 90+8'	Report	Carragher (yellow card) 45+1'; Taylor 60'; Wright 66'; Moxon 87'; Fox (yellow card) 89'	Stadium: Eco-Power Stadium; Attendance: 8,128; Referee: David Rock

27 January 2026 29	Wycombe Wanderers	2–0	Wigan Athletic	High Wycombe
19:45 GMT	Boyd-Munce 2' (pen.); Woodrow 72'	Report		Stadium: Adams Park; Attendance: 4,190; Referee: Paul Howard

31 January 2026 30	Wigan Athletic	0–1	Lincoln City	Wigan
15:00 GMT	Moxon (yellow card) 74'	Report	Moylan 24'; Wickens (yellow card) 90+4'	Stadium: Brick Community Stadium; Attendance: 9,436; Referee: Carl Brook

7 February 2026 31	Peterborough United	6–1	Wigan Athletic	Peterborough
15:01 GMT	Lisbie 7', 9', (yellow card) 82', (goal) 90'; Morgan 41'; Leonard 68'; Aderoju 84'	Report	Taylor 27'; Wright (yellow card) 43'; Saydee (yellow card) 66'; Asamoah Jr (yellow card) 82'	Stadium: Weston Homes Stadium; Attendance: 8,443; Referee: Stephen Parkinson
Note: Kick off was pushed back one minute for EFL's Every Minute Matters campaign.

10 February 2026 16	Wigan Athletic	1–2	Reading	Wigan
19:45 GMT	Taylor 66'; Wright (yellow card) 85'	Report	Doyle (yellow card) 42'; Dorsett 48'; O'Connor 87'	Stadium: Brick Community Stadium; Attendance: 7,973; Referee: Lee Swabey
Note: Fixture was originally scheduled for 15 November, but was postponed due to international call-ups in the Reading squad.

18 February 2026 33	Wigan Athletic	1–0	Luton Town	Wigan
19:45 GMT	Aimson (yellow card) 23'; Borges Rodrigues (yellow card) 27'; Moxon (yellow card) 37'; Taylor 73'; Sessegnon (yellow card) 89'	Report	Richards (yellow card) 35'; Lonwijk (yellow card) 63'	Stadium: Brick Community Stadium; Attendance: 8,440; Referee: Jamie O'Connor
Note: Fixture was originally scheduled for 17 February, but was pushed back 24 hours due to Wigan's FA Cup fixture with Arsenal on 15 February.

21 February 2026 34	Stockport County	4–2	Wigan Athletic	Stockport
15:00 GMT	Hills 5'; Sidibeh 41'; Norwood (yellow card) 82'; Wootton 90+2', 90+10'	Report	Taylor 3', 11'; Sessegnon (yellow card) 37' (yellow-red card) 60'; Costelloe (yellow card) 57'; Asamoah Jr (red card) 90+5'	Stadium: Edgeley Park; Attendance: 9,928; Referee: Matthew Corlett

28 February 2026 35	Wigan Athletic	1–0	Huddersfield Town	Wigan
15:00 GMT	Weir 61', (yellow card) 72'; M.Smith (yellow card) 88'	Report	Sørensen (yellow card) 45'; Harness (yellow card) 52'; Roughan (yellow card) 84'	Stadium: Brick Community Stadium; Attendance: 12,811; Referee: Charles Breakspear

7 March 2026 36	Blackpool	1–1	Wigan Athletic	Blackpool
15:00 GMT	Casey 4'; Anderson (yellow card) 65'; Ihiekwe (yellow card) 67'	Report	Moxon 39'; Murray (yellow card) 80'	Stadium: Bloomfield Road; Attendance: 11,210; Referee: Matthew Russell

10 March 2026 26	Wigan Athletic	0–3	Plymouth Argyle	Wigan
19:45 GMT		Report	Pepple 38', 40'; Curtis (yellow card) 53'; Watts (yellow card) 64', (goal) 71'	Stadium: Brick Community Stadium; Attendance: 8,055; Referee: Scott Oldham
Note: Fixture was originally scheduled for 10 January, but was rearranged due to Wigan's involvement in the FA Cup.

14 March 2026 37	Wigan Athletic	2–0	Bradford City	Wigan
15:00 GMT	Vickers 20'; Aimson (yellow card) 31'; Kerr (yellow card) 39'; Weir (yellow card) 68'; Taylor 78'; Borges Rodrigues (yellow card) 82'	Report	Touray (yellow card) 66'; Ashby (yellow card) 90+5'	Stadium: Brick Community Stadium; Attendance: 16,710; Referee: Andrew Humphries

17 March 2026 38	Barnsley	1–1	Wigan Athletic	Barnsley
20:00 GMT	de Gevigney (yellow card) 45+1'; Yoganathan (yellow card) 50'; Connell (yellow card) 75'; Lennon 90+6'	Report	Taylor 29'; Wright (yellow card) 56' (yellow-red card) 88'; Moxon (yellow card) 57'	Stadium: Oakwell; Attendance: 8,900; Referee: Ross Martin
Note: Fixture was originally scheduled for a 19:45 kick-off, but was moved for live Sky Sports broadcast.

21 March 2026 39	Wigan Athletic	2–0	Exeter City	Wigan
15:00 GMT	Taylor 5'; Murray 85'; Borges Rodrigues (yellow card) 90+1'	Report	Yfeko (yellow card) 29'; McMillan (yellow card) 69'; Andrew (yellow card) 90+1'	Stadium: Brick Community Stadium; Attendance: 9,506; Referee: Edward Duckworth

28 March 2026 40	Reading	3–0	Wigan Athletic	Reading
15:00 GMT	Ehibhatiomhan 9', 63'; Aimson 19' (o.g.)	Report		Stadium: Select Car Leasing Stadium; Attendance: 11,981; Referee: Steven Copeland

2 April 2026 41	Wigan Athletic	0–0	Leyton Orient	Wigan
19:45 BST	Carragher (yellow card) 56'	Report	Happe (yellow card) 49'; Abdulai (yellow card) 64'	Stadium: Brick Community Stadium; Attendance: 9,239; Referee: Tom Reeves
Note: Fixture was originally scheduled for 3 April, but was brought forward after an agreement with both clubs on the busy Easter schedule.

6 April 2026 42	Northampton Town	1–3	Wigan Athletic	Northampton
15:00 BST	Evans 80'	Report	Carragher (yellow card) 14'; Wright 15'; Guthrie 45' (o.g.); Aimson 88'	Stadium: Sixfields Stadium; Attendance: 6,148; Referee: Alex Chilowicz

11 April 2026 43	Wigan Athletic	2–1	Mansfield Town	Wigan
15:00 BST	Wright 25'; Taylor (yellow card) 43', (goal) 71' (pen.); Weir (yellow card) 74'	Report	Akins 28'; Sweeney (yellow card) 45+1'	Stadium: Brick Community Stadium; Attendance: 10,196; Referee: Ollie Yates

14 April 2026 32	Wigan Athletic	3–0	Rotherham United	Wigan
19:45 BST	Kerr 15'; Taylor 52'; Wright 63'; Murray (yellow card) 64'; Aimson (yellow card) 88'	Report	Baptiste (yellow card) 41'; Cover (yellow card) 72'	Stadium: Brick Community Stadium; Attendance: 7,989; Referee: Ben Speedie
Note: Fixture was originally scheduled for 14 February, but was rearranged due to Wigan's involvement in the FA Cup.

19 April 2026 44	Port Vale	0–0	Wigan Athletic	Stoke-on-Trent
15:00 BST		Report	Carragher (yellow card) 90+8'	Stadium: Vale Park; Attendance: 7,348; Referee: Elliot Bell
Note: Fixture was originally scheduled for 18 April, but was pushed back 24 hours due to Port Vale's fixture backlog.

25 April 2026 45	Wigan Athletic	0–1	AFC Wimbledon	Wigan
15:00 BST	Wright (yellow card) 60'; Taylor (yellow card) 88'; Aimson (yellow card) 90+7'	Report	Seddon (yellow card) 35'; Ogundere (yellow card) 49'; Hippolyte (yellow card) 52'; A.Smith (yellow card) 81'; Hackford 90'	Stadium: Brick Community Stadium; Attendance: 10,179; Referee: Matthew Corlett

2 May 2026 46	Stevenage	1–0	Wigan Athletic	Stevenage
15:00 BST	Sweeney 90+2'; Kemp (yellow card) 90+6'	Report	Taylor (yellow card) 45+1'	Stadium: Lamex Stadium; Attendance: 6,671; Referee: Matthew Russell

== FA Cup ==
Wigan were drawn at home to Hemel Hempstead Town in the first round and to Barrow in the second round. They were then drawn away to Preston North End in the third round and to Arsenal in the fourth round.

Win Draw Loss Fixtures

1 November 2025 First round	Wigan Athletic	1–1 (a.e.t.) (5–3 p)	Hemel Hempstead Town	Wigan
15:00 GMT	Wright 25'; M.Smith (red card) 61'; Murray (yellow card) 76'; McManaman (yellow card) 97'; Borges Rodrigues (yellow card) 116'	Report	White 61' (pen.); Johnson (yellow card) 74'; Dowrich (yellow card) 112'; Stanley (yellow card) 113'	Stadium: Brick Community Stadium; Attendance: 4,020; Referee: Aaron Bannister
	Penalties
	McManaman (penalty scored); Kerr (penalty scored); Aimson (penalty scored); Saydee (penalty scored); Fox (penalty scored)		Brown (penalty scored); Azeez (penalty missed); Gray (penalty scored); Noel-Williams (penalty scored)

6 December 2025 Second round	Wigan Athletic	2–2 (a.e.t.) (4–3 p)	Barrow	Wigan
15:00 GMT	Carragher 13'; Murray (yellow card) 84'; Aimson 89'	Report	McCann (yellow card) 37'; Earing 65'; Canavan 85'; Williams (yellow card) 95'	Stadium: Brick Community Stadium; Attendance: 4,623; Referee: Martin Coy
	Penalties
	McManaman (penalty scored); Murray (penalty scored); AImson (penalty scored); Saydee (penalty scored)		McCann (penalty scored); Newby (penalty scored); Jackson (penalty missed); Gordon (penalty scored); Williams (penalty missed)

9 January 2026 Third round	Preston North End	0–1	Wigan Athletic	Preston
19:30 GMT	Thompson (yellow card) 90+3'	Report	Costelloe (yellow card) 71'; Bettoni 75'; Wright (penalty missed) 84	Stadium: Deepdale; Attendance: 14,366; Referee: Oliver Langford

15 February 2026 Fourth round	Arsenal	4–0	Wigan Athletic	Holloway
16:30 GMT	Madueke 11'; Martinelli 18'; Hunt 23' (o.g.); Gabriel Jesus 27'; Lewis-Skelly (yellow card) 69'; Nørgaard (yellow card) 82'	Report	Moxon (yellow card) 73'; Aimson (yellow card) 83'	Stadium: Emirates Stadium; Attendance: 59,996; Referee: Tim Robinson

== EFL Cup ==
Wigan were drawn at home to Notts County in the first round, at home to Stockport County in the second round, and at home to Wycombe Wanderers in the third round.

Win Draw Loss Fixtures

12 August 2025 First round	Wigan Athletic	1–0	Notts County	Wigan
19:45 BST	Mullin 10' (pen.); Brenan (yellow card) 23'; Tickle (yellow card) 54'; Murray (yellow card) 68'; Weir (yellow card) 83'	Report	Cotter (yellow card) 32'	Stadium: Brick Community Stadium; Attendance: 2,907; Referee: Ollie Yates

26 August 2025 Second round	Wigan Athletic	1–0	Stockport County	Wigan
19:45 BST	Murray 84'	Report	O'Keeffe (yellow card) 45+3'; Fiorini (yellow card) 56'	Stadium: Brick Community Stadium; Attendance: 3,119; Referee: Tom Reeves

23 September 2025 Third round	Wigan Athletic	0–2	Wycombe Wanderers	Wigan
19:45 BST	Wright (yellow card) 78'; Costelloe (yellow card) 90+5'	Report	Boyd-Munce 32'; Back (yellow card) 41'; Huggins (yellow card) 60'; McNeilly 62'; Lowry (yellow card) 90+4'	Stadium: Brick Community Stadium; Attendance: 2,077; Referee: Edward Duckworth

== EFL Trophy ==
Wigan were drawn against Salford City, Stockport Couny and Wolverhampton Wanderers U21 in the group stage.

Pos	Div	Team	Pld	W	PW	PL	L	GF	GA	GD	Pts	Qualification
1	L2	Salford City	3	3	0	0	0	9	3	+6	9	Advance to Round 2
2	L1	Stockport County	3	1	1	0	1	7	7	0	5	Advance to Round 2
3	ACA	Wolverhampton Wanderers U21	3	1	0	0	2	7	10	−3	3	
4	L1	Wigan Athletic	3	0	0	1	2	2	5	−3	1	

Source: EFL

Win Draw Loss Fixtures

2 September 2025 North Group A	Wigan Athletic	0–2	Salford City	Wigan
19:00 BST	Graham (yellow card) 29'; Greenhalgh (yellow card) 90+2'	Report	Turton 50'; Bird (yellow card) 67'; Stockton 81'	Stadium: Brick Community Stadium; Attendance: 1,953; Referee: Richard Eley

7 October 2025 North Group A	Wigan Athletic	1–2	Wolverhampton Wanderers U21	Wigan
19:00 BST	Asamoah Jr 29'; Brenan (yellow card) 55'; Miller (yellow card) 75'	Report	Edozie 11'; Olagunju (yellow card) 43'; Mané 88' (pen.)	Stadium: Brick Community Stadium; Attendance: 1,324; Referee: Zac Kennard-Kettle

11 November 2025 North Group A	Stockport County	1–1 (6–5 p)	Wigan Athletic	Edgeley
19:00 GMT	O'Keeffe 32'; Moxon (yellow card) 74'	Report	McManaman (yellow card) 14'; Costelloe 39'; Brenan (yellow card) 50'	Stadium: Edgeley Park; Attendance: 1,337; Referee: Scott Oldham
	Penalties
	Fiorini (penalty scored); Dodgson (penalty scored); Fevrier (penalty scored); Moxon (penalty missed); O'Keeffe (penalty scored); Addai (penalty scored); Cina (penalty scored)		Murray (penalty scored); Kerr (penalty scored); Aimson (penalty scored); Costelloe (penalty scored); Fox (penalty missed); Bettoni (penalty scored); Weir (penalty missed)

== Statistics ==
=== Appearances and goals ===
As of match played 2 May 2026

Players with no appearances are not included on the list

No.	Pos	Nat	Player	Total		League One		FA Cup		EFL Cup		EFL Trophy	
No.	Pos	Nat	Player	Apps	Goals	Apps	Goals	Apps	Goals	Apps	Goals	Apps	Goals
1	GK	(England) ENG	Sam Tickle	53	0	46+0	0	4+0	0	3+0	0	0+0	0
2	DF	(England) ENG	Isaac Mabaya	3	0	0+2	0	0+0	0	1+0	0	0+0	0
3	DF	(Wales) WAL	Morgan Fox	41	0	30+5	0	4+0	0	1+0	0	0+1	0
4	DF	(England) ENG	Will Aimson	50	2	43+0	1	3+1	1	2+0	0	1+0	0
5	DF	(England) ENG	Steven Sessegnon	15	0	8+3	0	0+1	0	1+0	0	2+0	0
6	MF	(England) ENG	Jensen Weir	46	2	33+4	2	3+1	0	2+0	0	3+0	0
7	MF	(Scotland) SCO	Fraser Murray	52	6	42+3	5	3+0	0	0+3	1	0+1	0
8	MF	(England) ENG	Callum Wright	49	8	37+4	7	4+0	1	2+1	0	1+0	0
9	FW	(England) ENG	Christian Saydee	46	2	28+13	2	1+2	0	0+2	0	0+0	0
10	FW	(Wales) WAL	Joe Taylor	22	11	19+2	11	1+0	0	0+0	0	0+0	0
11	FW	(Republic of Ireland) IRL	Dara Costelloe	45	4	22+16	3	2+1	0	1+2	0	1+0	1
12	GK	(England) ENG	Tom Watson	1	0	0+0	0	0+0	0	0+0	0	1+0	0
14	MF	(England) ENG	Ryan Trevitt	14	0	8+4	0	0+0	0	1+1	0	0+0	0
15	DF	(Scotland) SCO	Jason Kerr	37	2	32+0	2	2+0	0	2+0	0	1+0	0
16	MF	(Republic of Ireland) IRL	Baba Adeeko	10	0	2+5	0	0+0	0	2+0	0	1+0	0
17	MF	(England) ENG	Matt Smith	43	1	28+9	1	2+2	0	1+1	0	0+0	0
18	FW	(England) ENG	Jonny Smith	2	0	0+1	0	0+0	0	1+0	0	0+0	0
19	DF	(Scotland) SCO	Luke Robinson	17	0	6+8	0	0+1	0	0+0	0	2+0	0
20	FW	(England) ENG	Callum McManaman	21	0	1+13	0	0+2	0	1+1	0	3+0	0
21	FW	(Australia) AUS	Raphael Borges Rodrigues	43	1	29+8	1	3+1	0	1+0	0	0+1	0
22	DF	(England) ENG	Jon Mellish	2	0	0+2	0	0+0	0	0+0	0	0+0	0
23	DF	(Malta) MLT	James Carragher	28	1	19+6	0	3+0	1	0+0	0	0+0	0
25	FW	(England) ENG	Caylan Vickers	11	1	2+9	1	0+0	0	0+0	0	0+0	0
26	MF	(England) ENG	Joe Adams	1	0	0+0	0	0+0	0	0+0	0	0+1	0
27	MF	(England) ENG	Tobias Brenan	11	0	5+0	0	0+1	0	2+0	0	3+0	0
28	MF	(England) ENG	Leo Graham	3	0	0+0	0	0+0	0	0+1	0	2+0	0
30	GK	(England) ENG	Toby Savin	2	0	0+0	0	0+0	0	0+0	0	2+0	0
32	DF	(England) ENG	Jack Hunt	3	0	2+0	0	1+0	0	0+0	0	0+0	0
33	MF	(England) ENG	Owen Moxon	16	2	12+3	2	1+0	0	0+0	0	0+0	0
35	MF	(Australia) AUS	Tyrese Francois	14	0	10+3	0	1+0	0	0+0	0	0+0	0
37	FW	(England) ENG	Maleace Asamoah	26	2	1+19	1	0+1	0	3+0	0	2+0	1
43	MF	(England) ENG	Harrison Bettoni	27	4	9+12	3	1+2	1	0+0	0	1+2	0
44	FW	(England) ENG	Joseph Hungbo	39	0	16+16	0	2+1	0	2+1	0	1+0	0
45	DF	(England) ENG	Llyton Chapman	9	0	5+4	0	0+0	0	0+0	0	0+0	0
48	DF	(England) ENG	Jack Rogers	2	0	0+0	0	0+0	0	0+0	0	2+0	0
51	MF	(England) ENG	Harrison Rimmer	1	0	0+0	0	0+0	0	0+0	0	1+0	0
52	FW	(England) ENG	Charlie Hughes	1	0	0+0	0	0+0	0	0+0	0	0+1	0
54	DF	(England) ENG	James Knott	2	0	0+0	0	0+0	0	0+0	0	0+2	0
55	FW	(England) ENG	Reece Greenhalgh	1	0	0+0	0	0+0	0	0+0	0	0+1	0
56	DF	(England) ENG	Callum Jones	1	0	0+0	0	0+0	0	0+0	0	0+1	0
60	DF	(Wales) WAL	Alex Hughes	1	0	0+0	0	0+0	0	0+0	0	0+1	0
61	FW	(England) ENG	Christy Edwards	2	0	0+0	0	0+0	0	0+0	0	1+1	0
62	MF	(England) ENG	Joe Gilbertson	1	0	0+0	0	0+0	0	0+0	0	0+1	0
Player(s) who featured but departed the club during the season:
10	FW	(England) ENG	Paul Mullin	26	5	7+13	4	2+0	0	2+1	1	1+0	0
24	MF	(England) ENG	Harry McHugh	1	0	0+0	0	0+0	0	0+1	0	0+0	0
31	MF	(Wales) WAL	Ollie Cooper	13	1	4+5	1	1+1	0	1+0	0	0+1	0
