= Harrison Bettoni =

English footballer (born 2007)

Personal information
- Full name: Harrison Lee Bettoni
- Date of birth: 24 July 2007 (age 19)
- Place of birth: Tameside, England
- Position: Attacking midfielder

Team information
- Current team: Chelsea
- Number: 52

Youth career
- 2018–2019: Curzon Ashton
- 2019–2025: Wigan Athletic

Senior career*
Years	Team	Apps	(Gls)
2025–2026	Wigan Athletic	21	(3)
2026–	Chelsea	0	(0)
- * Club domestic league appearances and goals as of 23 July 2026 (UTC)

Harrison Lee Bettoni (born 24 July 2007) is an English footballer who plays as an attacking midfielder for Premier League club Chelsea.

== Career ==
=== Wigan Athletic ===
Bettoni joined the academy of Wigan Athletic at under-13s level, signing a first professional contract in July 2024 having featured for the first-team in pre-season. He made his senior debut in September 2025 in a 2–0 EFL Trophy defeat to Salford City.

On 22 November 2025, Bettoni made a dream League One debut in a 2–1 away victory over AFC Wimbledon. Having entered the pitch as a substitute in the 77th minute, he scored a free kick to immediately equalise with his first touch, later scoring the winner with just three minutes remaining to secure the Latics a first away win of the season.

=== Chelsea ===
On 23 July 2026, Bettoni joined Premier League club Chelsea.

== Career statistics ==
As of match played 23 July 2026

Appearances and goals by club, season and competition
Club	Season	League			FA Cup		League Cup		Other		Total	
Club	Season	Division	Apps	Goals	Apps	Goals	Apps	Goals	Apps	Goals	Apps	Goals
Wigan Athletic	2025–26	League One	21	3	3	1	0	0	3 (Note: Appearance(s) in EFL Trophy)	0	27	4
Career total			21	3	3	1	0	0	3	0	27	4
