= List of Wigan Athletic F.C. records and statistics =

Wigan Athletic Football Club is a professional football team based in Wigan, Greater Manchester. The club was formed in 1932, and joined the Football League in 1978. Wigan Athletic currently compete in the third tier of English football, the EFL League One.

== Club records ==
=== Matches ===
==== Firsts ====
- First competitive match: Wigan Athletic 0–2 Port Vale Reserves, Cheshire League, 27 August 1932.
- First FA Cup match: Wigan Athletic 1–1 Great Harwood, preliminary round, 16 September 1933.
- First Northern Premier League match: Scarborough 0–2 Wigan Athletic, 10 August 1968.
- First Football League match: Hereford United 0–0 Wigan Athletic, 19 August 1978.

==== Record results ====
- Record win: 14–0 against Chorley (pre-season friendly) 1 August 2017
- Record Football League win: 8–0 v Hull City, Championship, 14 July 2020.
- Record Football League defeat: 1–9 v Tottenham Hotspur, Premier League, 2009.

=== Attendances ===
- Highest attendance (Springfield Park): 27,526 v Hereford United, FA Cup, 1953.
- Highest attendance (DW Stadium): 25,133 v Manchester United, Premier League, May 2008.

== Player records ==
=== Appearances ===
- Youngest player ever : Jensen Weir, aged 15 years, on 7 November 2017.
- Oldest player ever: Dave Beasant, 43 years, 235 days, v Doncaster Rovers, 12 November 2002.
- Most League appearances: Kevin Langley, 317, 1981–1986 & 1990–1994.
- Most consecutive League appearances: Jimmy Bullard, 123, January 2003 to December 2005.

=== Goalscorers ===
- Most goals in the League: 70, Andy Liddell, 1998–2004.
- Most League goals scored in a season: 31, Graeme Jones, 1996–97.
- Most goals in the Premiership: 24, Hugo Rodallega, 2009–2012.
- Most goals at the DW Stadium: 41, Nathan Ellington, 2002–2005.

=== Transfer fees ===
- Highest transfer fee paid: Charles N'Zogbia, £7 million,^{[A]} February 2009.
- Highest transfer fee received: Antonio Valencia, £15 million, June 2009.

==== Progressive record fees paid ====
Date	Player	Bought from	Fee
January 1982	(Republic of Ireland) Eamonn O'Keefe	(England) Everton	£65,000
July 1995	(England) Chris Lightfoot	(England) Chester City	£87,500
November 1995	(Canada) Kevin Sharp	(England) Leeds United	£100,000
July 1996	(England) Graeme Jones	(England) Doncaster Rovers	£150,000
April 1997	(Northern Ireland) Roy Carroll	(England) Hull City	£350,000
October 1998	(Wales) Simon Haworth	(England) Coventry City	£600,000
March 2001	(Scotland) Lee McCulloch	(Scotland) Motherwell	£700,000
September 2001	(England) Tony Dinning	(England) Wolverhampton Wanderers	£750,000
March 2002	(England) Nathan Ellington	(England) Bristol Rovers	£1,200,000
January 2004	(Grenada) Jason Roberts	(England) West Bromwich Albion	£2,000,000
August 2005	(Senegal) Henri Camara	(England) Wolverhampton Wanderers	£3,000,000
July 2006	(England) Emile Heskey	(England) Birmingham City	£5,500,000
January 2009	(France) Charles N'Zogbia	(England) Newcastle United	£7,000,000

==== Progressive record fees received ====
Date	Player	Sold to	Fee
February 1980	(England) Joe Hinnigan	Sunderland	£130,000
February 1986	(England) Warren Aspinall	Everton	£150,000
October 1989	(England) Paul Beesley	Leyton Orient	£175,000
January 1991	(England) Ray Woods	Coventry City	£200,000
August 1991	(England) Peter Atherton	Coventry City	£329,000
July 2001	(Northern Ireland) Roy Carroll	Manchester United	£2,500,000
August 2005	(England) Nathan Ellington	West Bromwich Albion	£3,000,001
August 2006	(France) Pascal Chimbonda	Tottenham Hotspur	£4,500,000
August 2007	(England) Leighton Baines	Everton	£6,000,000
January 2009	(Honduras) Wilson Palacios	Tottenham Hotspur	£12,000,000
June 2009	(Ecuador) Antonio Valencia	Manchester United	£16,000,000

== Player of the Year ==
Year	Winner
1978–79	(England) Tommy Gore
1979–80	(England) John Brown
1980–81	(Scotland) Colin Methven
1981–82	(England) Les Bradd
1982–83	(England) Jimmy Weston
1983–84	(England) John Butler
1984–85	(England) Tony Kelly
1985–86	(Scotland) Colin Methven
1986–87	(England) Barry Knowles
1987–88	(England) David Hamilton
1988–89	(England) David Thompson
1989–90	(England) Peter Atherton

Year	Winner
1990–91	(England) Peter Atherton
1991–92	(England) Phil Daley
1992–93	(England) Allen Tankard
1993–94	(England) Andy Lyons
1994–95	(England) Neill Rimmer
1995–96	(Spain) Roberto Martínez
1996–97	(England) Graeme Jones
1997–98	(England) David Lowe
1998–99	(England) Colin Greenall
1999–2000	(Scotland) Andy Liddell
2000–01	(Netherlands) Arjan de Zeeuw
2001–02	(Netherlands) Arjan de Zeeuw

Year	Winner
2002–03	(Canada) Jason de Vos
2003–04	(Australia) John Filan
2004–05	(Grenada) Jason Roberts
2005–06	(Netherlands) Arjan de Zeeuw
2006–07	(England) Leighton Baines
2007–08	(Austria) Paul Scharner
2008–09	(England) Titus Bramble
2009–10	(France) Charles N'Zogbia
2010–11	(Oman) Ali Al-Habsi
2011–12	(Scotland) Gary Caldwell
2012–13	(Scotland) Shaun Maloney
2013–14	(Spain) Jordi Gómez

Year	Winner
2014–15	(Republic of Ireland) James McClean
2015–16	(England) David Perkins
2016–17	(England) Dan Burn
2017–18	(England) Nathan Byrne
2018–19	(England) Reece James
2019–20	(Egypt) Sam Morsy
2021–22	(England) Jack Whatmough
2022–23	(Republic of Ireland) James McClean
2023–24	(England) Sam Tickle
2024–25	(Northern Ireland) Dale Taylor

== Notes ==
A. Wigan paid Newcastle United £6 million for N'Zogbia, with Ryan Taylor (valued at £1 million) transferring to Newcastle in a part-exchange deal.
