= Callum Wright =

English footballer (born 2000)

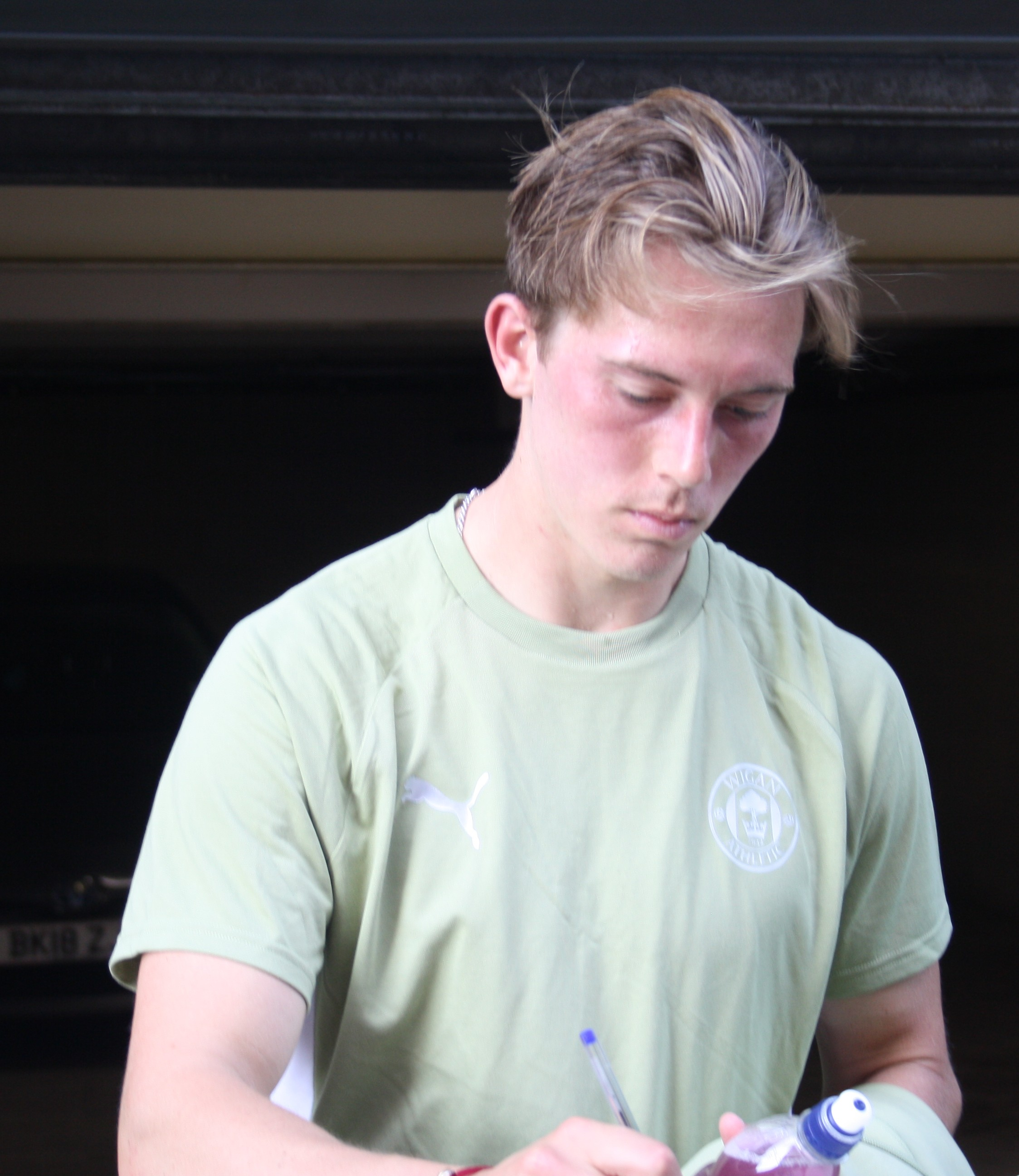
- Wright in 2025.

Personal information
- Date of birth: 2 May 2000 (age 26)
- Place of birth: Huyton, England
- Height: 1.82 m (6 ft 0 in)
- Position: Midfielder

Team information
- Current team: Hibernian
- Number: 23

Youth career
- Tranmere Rovers
- Everton
- 2015–2018: Blackburn Rovers
- 2018–2020: Leicester City

Senior career*
Years	Team	Apps	(Gls)
2020–2022	Leicester City	0	(0)
2021	→ Cheltenham Town (loan)	17	(4)
2021–2022	→ Cheltenham Town (loan)	34	(9)
2022–2023	Blackpool	10	(0)
2023–2026	Plymouth Argyle	76	(5)
2025–2026	→ Wigan Athletic (loan)	41	(7)
2026–	Hibernian	9	(3)
- * Club domestic league appearances and goals as of 08:42, 22 November 2026 (UTC)

Callum Wright (born 2 May 2000) is an English professional footballer who plays as a midfielder for Scottish Premiership club Hibernian.

Born in Merseyside, Wright began with Tranmere Rovers and Everton before moving to the youth setup of Blackburn Rovers in 2015. He then left for Leicester City in 2018. Wright was loaned out to Cheltenham Town in the 2021–2022 season, helping them secure promotion to League One after a successful loan spell. He returned the following season and helped Cheltenham achieve their highest ever finish in the third tier. He then moved permanently to Blackpool in 2022, but struggled for gametime and signed for Plymouth in January 2023.

== Early and personal life ==
Wright grew up in Huyton and attended Cardinal Heenan Catholic High School in West Derby. The Bluebell Estate in Huyton where he was raised was also the home to Liverpool's Steven Gerrard and Leicester City striker David Nugent. He grew up "idolising" the former, and served as a Liverpool team mascot at the Champions League semi-final against Chelsea in 2008.

== Career ==
=== Early career ===
"The reason I played for Tranmere was I could play with my mates. So if I played for Tranmere on a Sunday and I'd train two or three times a week I could still play with my friends on the Saturday. Whereas your Liverpool's and your Everton's you were contracted from the age of eight so you weren't allowed to play any Sunday League football."

— Wright on playing for Tranmere Rovers.

Wright began with Tranmere Rovers after being scouted while playing for his brother's team, before leaving for Everton. He was released by Everton at age 13, before moving to Blackburn Rovers following a trial in 2015. He signed a two-year scholarship in 2016. After making 24 appearances and scoring 3 times for the under-18s in his debut season, he was moved up to the under-23 squad in 2017. He attracted interest from numerous Premier League teams while at Blackburn, including his former team Everton.

=== Leicester City ===
Wright eventually chose Leicester City, signing a three-and-a-half year contract in February 2018. Wright made his Leicester under-23 debut on 2 February 2018 in a 1–0 defeat to Chelsea in the Premier League 2. While at Leicester, he was called up to the England U18 to play in the 2018 Panda Cup in China.

==== 2020–21 season: First Cheltenham Town loan ====
Wright joined EFL League Two side Cheltenham Town on loan in February 2021 for the remainder of the season. He made his Cheltenham Town debut on 16 February 2021, starting in a league match away to Walsall. The match finished 2–1 to Cheltenham with Wright scoring the winner. Manager Michael Duff praised Wright for not looking "like a crisp packet, floating around and getting knocked over." On the final matchday on 8 May, Wright scored in a 4–1 win against Harrogate Town to secure the League Two title. He finished the season 17 appearances with four goals in his debut campaign with Cheltenham. His goal on 2 April 2021, a volley in a 4–0 win over his former club Tranmere Rovers won Cheltenham's Goal of the Season.

==== 2021–22 season: Second Cheltenham Town loan ====
In August 2021 he returned to Cheltenham Town for a season-long second loan spell, who were now in League One. His contract for Leicester was due to expire in the summer of 2021 but he activated a one-year extension when rejoining Cheltenham. His first match of the season came on 10 August in a 2–0 win over Bristol Rovers in the EFL Cup. His league debut came on 14 August in a 3–1 defeat at home to Wycombe Wanderers. He scored his first goal on 17 August against Ipswich Town, the equaliser in a match that eventually finished in a 2–1 victory. After the match, manager Michael Duff compared Wright's ability to impact games to Frank Lampard. After one goal and 3 assists in 6 appearances in August, he won Cheltenham's Player of the Month. Wright also won August Goal of the Month for a goal he scored on 27 August in a 1–1 draw to Burton Albion.

However, it was revealed in September that Wright had sustained a lateral ligament injury and could be out for 6 months. He made his return 2 months later on 23 November in a 2–0 victory against Gillingham, coming on as a substitute for Alfie May. His goal on 8 January in a 1–1 draw against Burton, described as a "stunning volley", won January's Goal of the Month. After playing all five matches in January, scoring twice, he won Player of the Month, repeating the feat he performed in August of winning both Goal and Player of the Month. Wright finished the season with 37 appearances in all competitions with nine goals.

=== Blackpool ===
On his return to Leicester, Wright's contract was set to expire in the summer of 2022. As a result, numerous EFL teams were interested in signing him. Wright extended his contract with Leicester for one year until 2023 instead, saying "I can't wait to take on the next challenge." He impressed in pre-season but joined Blackpool on 1 September 2022 for an undisclosed fee. The contract was for an initial three years, with an option to extend for an additional year. Blackpool manager Michael Appleton had worked with Wright when Appleton was at Leicester. Wright made his debut on 14 September in a 3–0 defeat to Rotherham United. He was also injured in the match, dislocating a joint in his leg. He made his first start on his return from injury against Norwich City on 1 October. By January 2023, Wright had made ten appearances with half of them being starts.

=== Plymouth Argyle ===
==== 2022–23 season ====
Wright signed for League One leaders Plymouth Argyle in January 2023, signing a three-and-a-half contract until 2026. He said of the move, "It was a no-brainer, as soon as it came back about. When the window opened, I knew it could happen. I said to my agent and my family: 'I just need to get it done. I want to go there and become one of them.'"

He started a full debut on 7 January in a goalless draw to Bolton Wanderers. Wright scored his first goal in his home debut against his former club Cheltenham in a 4–2 victory on 21 January. Wright finished the season with 20 league appearances for Plymouth, 23 in all competitions, and four goals.

==== 2023–24 season ====
Wright started Plymouth's Championship season opener on 5 August 2023 in a 3–1 victory against Huddersfield Town. He suffered a knee ligament injury in a 4–1 defeat to Bristol City on 19 September 2023, and it was reported he could miss up to seven weeks despite not needing surgery. He made his return in a 3–3 draw against Middlesbrough on 4 November, and made his first start on 9 December in a 4–0 defeat to former club Leicester. After manager Steven Schumacher left for Stoke City in December, Ian Foster was appointed to replace him. Under Foster, Wright fell out of favour, playing one league match before Foster was sacked. Wright finished the season with eight starts in 21 league appearances without scoring.

==== 2024–25 season ====
Wright came on as a substitute for Mustapha Bundu against Sheffield Wednesday on 11 August 2024, a match which finished in a 4–0 loss. Wright faced a red card for what new manager Wayne Rooney called "a stupid tackle" on Joel Latibeaudiere in a 4–0 defeat to Coventry City on 26 December 2024 and was suspended for three matches. Under new manager Miron Muslić, Wright saw more gametime after having limited playing time under Rooney. In the fourth round of the FA Cup, Plymouth drew Liverpool, the club Wright supports. Wright started the match, which Plymouth won 1–0. Plymouth owner Simon Hallett praised Wright for "playing like a man possessed", and Wright swapped shirts with Liverpool player Luis Díaz after the match.

==== Wigan Athletic (loan) ====
On 4 July 2025, Wright joined League One side Wigan Athletic on a season-long loan deal.

He was released by Plymouth at the end of the 2025–26 season.

=== Hibernian ===
On 23 June 2026, Wright signed for Scottish Premiership side Hibernian on a three-year deal, subject to SFA clearance.

== Career statistics ==
As of match played 21 November 2026

Appearances and goals by club, season and competition
Club	Season	League			National cup		League cup		Other		Total	
Club	Season	Division	Apps	Goals	Apps	Goals	Apps	Goals	Apps	Goals	Apps	Goals
Leicester City U21	2018–19	—			—		—		1 (Note: Appearance in EFL Trophy)	0	1	0
Leicester City U21	2019–20	—			—		—		5	0	5	0
Leicester City U21	2020–21	—			—		—		5	2	5	2
Leicester City U21	Total		—		—		—		11	2	11	2
Leicester City	2020–21	Premier League	0	0	0	0	0	0	—		0	0
Leicester City	2021–22	Premier League	0	0	0	0	0	0	—		0	0
Leicester City	Total		0	0	0	0	0	0	0	0	0	0
Cheltenham Town (loan)	2020–21	League Two	17	4	0	0	0	0	—		17	4
Cheltenham Town (loan)	2021–22	League One	34	9	1	0	2	0	—		37	9
Blackpool	2022–23	Championship	10	0	0	0	0	0	—		10	0
Plymouth Argyle	2022–23	League One	20	4	0	0	0	0	3	0	23	4
Plymouth Argyle	2023–24	Championship	21	0	3	0	2	0	—		26	0
Plymouth Argyle	2024–25	Championship	35	1	3	0	2	0	—		40	1
Plymouth Argyle	2025–26	League One	0	0	0	0	0	0	—		0	0
Plymouth Argyle	Total		76	5	6	0	4	0	3	0	89	5
Wigan Athletic (loan)	2025–26	League One	41	7	4	1	3	0	1	0	49	8
Hibernian	2026–27	Scottish Premiership	9	3	0	0	2	0	3 (Note: Appearances in UEFA Conference League)	0	14	3
Career total			187	28	11	1	11	0	18	2	227	31

== Honours ==
Cheltenham Town

- EFL League Two: 2020–21

Plymouth Argyle

- EFL League One: 2022–23
- EFL Trophy runner-up: 2022–23
